= Arangeh =

Village in Alborz province, Iran

Arangeh Persian: ارنگه
- Village
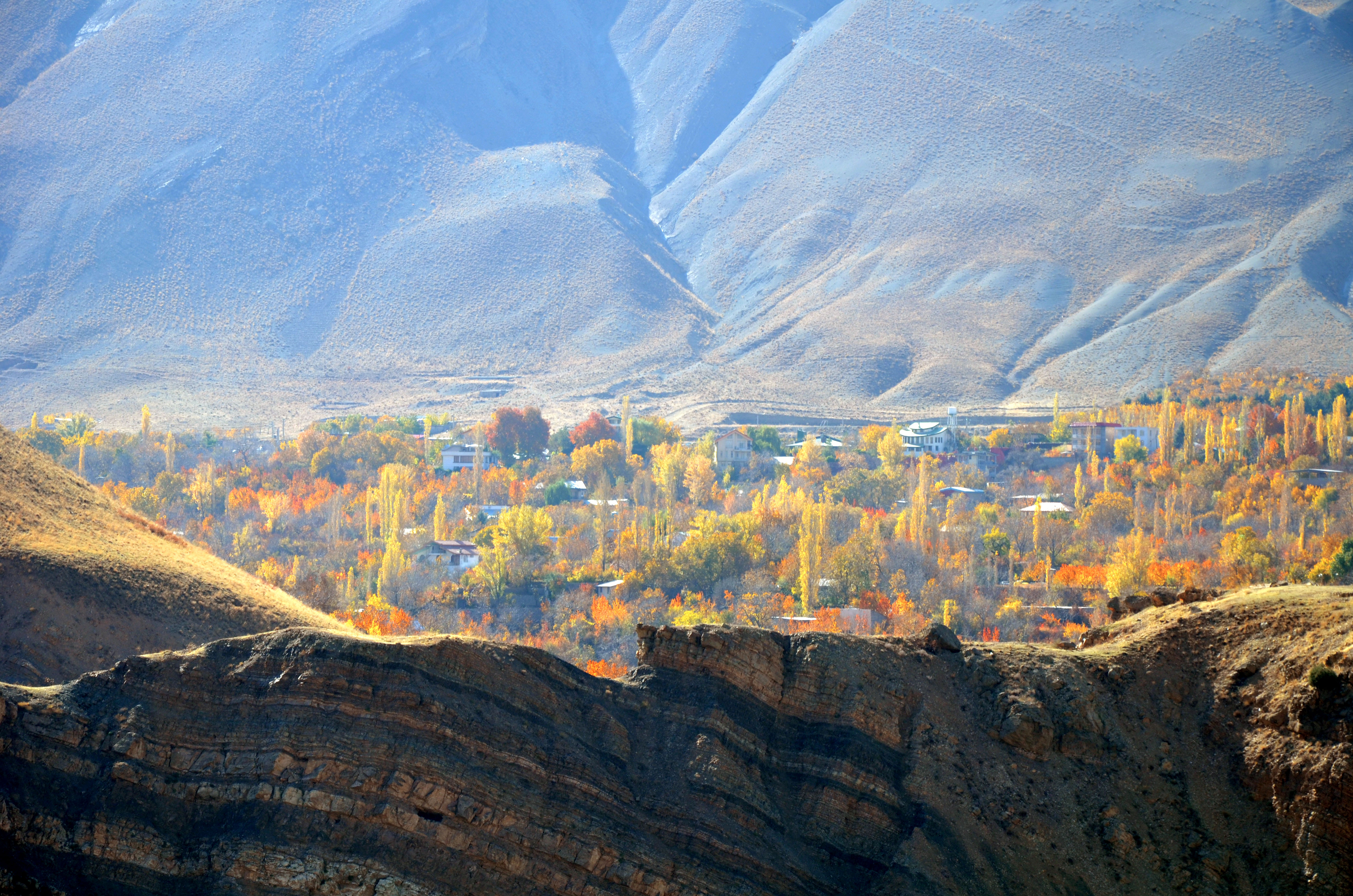
- The village of Arangeh from the Chalus Road

- Location within Iran
- Coordinates: 35°55′36″N 51°04′41″E
- Country: Iran
- Province: Alborz
- County: Karaj
- District: Asara
- Rural District: Adaran

Population (2016)
  - Total: 111
- Time zone: UTC+3:30 (IRST)

Arangeh (Persian: ارنگه is a village in Adaran Rural District of Asara District in Karaj County, Alborz province, Iran.

== Demographics ==
=== Population ===
At the time of the 2006 National Census, the village's population was 136 in 46 households, when it was in Tehran province. The 2016 census measured the population of the village as 111 people in 45 households, by which time the county had been separated from the province in the establishment of Alborz province.

== Overview ==
Arangeh is in the Alborz Mountain range north of Karaj at the 18km mark of the Chalus road. It includes eight villages: Arangeh Bozorg (ارنگه بزرگ), Abharak (ابهرک), Sijan (سیجان), Sar Ziarat (سرزیارت), Jey (جی), Charan (چاران), Gurab (گوراب), and Khur (خور). The region is called Arangeh, whose central and primary village is Arangeh Bozorg.

The village is notable for being the historical residence of the Iranian political dissident Ali Tehrani and the Khazeni Family, who were wealthy landowners during the Qajar dynasty.
