= Pol-e Khvab =

Neighborhood in Alborz province, Iran

Pol-e Khvab پل خواب
- Neighborhood
- Location within Iran
- Coordinates: 36°01′04″N 51°08′58″E
- Country: Iran
- Province: Alborz
- County: Karaj
- District: Asara
- City: Asara

Population (2006)
  - Total: 237
- Time zone: UTC+3:30 (IRST)

Pol-e Khvab (Persian: پل خواب) (Note: Also romanized as Pol Khvāb and Pol-e Khvāb) is a neighborhood in the city of Asara in Asara District of Karaj County, Alborz province, Iran.

== Demographics ==
=== Population ===
At the time of the 2006 National Census, Pol-e Khvab's population was 237 in 59 households, when it was a village in Adaran Rural District of Tehran province. In 2009, the village of Asara merged with the villages of Pol-e Khvab, Rey Zamin, and Sira in forming the new city of Asara.
