= Rey Zamin =

Neighborhood in Alborz province, Iran

Rey Zamin ري زمين
- Neighborhood
- Location within Iran
- Coordinates: 36°02′01″N 51°10′43″E
- Country: Iran
- Province: Alborz
- County: Karaj
- District: Asara
- City: Asara

Population (2006)
  - Total: 67
- Time zone: UTC+3:30 (IRST)

Rey Zamin (Persian: ري زمين) (Note: Also romanized as Rey Zamīn) is a neighborhood in the city of Asara in Asara District of Karaj County, Alborz province, Iran.

== Demographics ==
=== Population ===
At the time of the 2006 National Census, Rey Zamin's population was 67 in 20 households, when it was a village in Adaran Rural District of Tehran province. In 2009, the village of Asara merged with the villages of Pol-e Khvab, Rey Zamin, and Sira in forming the new city of Asara.
