= Sira, Iran =

Neighborhood in Alborz province, Iran

Sira سيرا
- Neighborhood
- Location within Iran
- Coordinates: 36°01′31″N 51°09′24″E
- Country: Iran
- Province: Alborz
- County: Karaj
- District: Asara
- City: Asara

Population (2006)
  - Total: 296
- Time zone: UTC+3:30 (IRST)

Sira (Persian: سيرا) (Note: Also romanized as Sīrā; also known as Sarab, also romanized as Sarāb; and Sirah) is a neighborhood in the city of Asara in Asara District of Karaj County, Alborz province, Iran.

== Demographics ==
=== Population ===
At the time of the 2006 National Census, Sira's population was 296 in 78 households, when it was a village in Adaran Rural District of Tehran province. In 2009, the village of Asara merged with the villages of Pol-e Khvab, Rey Zamin, and Sira in forming the new city of Asara.
