= Hareyn =

Village in Alborz province, Iran

Hareyn Persian: هرين
- Village
- Location within Iran
- Country: Iran
- Province: Alborz
- County: Karaj
- District: Asara
- Rural District: Adaran

Population (2016)
  - Total: 101
- Time zone: UTC+3:30 (IRST)

Hareyn (Persian: هرين) is a village in Adaran Rural District of Asara District in Karaj County, Alborz province, Iran.

== Demographics ==
=== Population ===
The village did not appear in the 2006 National Census, when it was in Tehran province. The 2016 census measured the population of the village as 101 people in 27 households, by which time the county had been separated from the province in the establishment of Alborz province.
