= Purkan, Alborz =

Village in Alborz province, Iran

Purkan Persian: پوركان
- Village
- Location within Iran
- Coordinates: 35°52′56″N 51°02′27″E
- Country: Iran
- Province: Alborz
- County: Karaj
- District: Asara
- Rural District: Adaran

Population (2016)
  - Total: 263
- Time zone: UTC+3:30 (IRST)

Purkan (Persian: پوركان) (Note: Also romanized as Pūrkān) is a village in Adaran Rural District of Asara District in Karaj County, Alborz province, Iran.

== Demographics ==
=== Population ===
At the time of the 2006 National Census, the village's population was 360 in 114 households, when it was in Tehran province. The 2016 census measured the population of the village as 263 people in 89 households, by which time the county had been separated from the province in the establishment of Alborz province.
