= Kushk-e Bala =

Village in Alborz province, Iran

Kushk-e Bala Persian: كوشك بالا
- Village
- Location within Iran
- Coordinates: 35°59′03″N 51°05′18″E
- Country: Iran
- Province: Alborz
- County: Karaj
- District: Asara
- Rural District: Adaran

Population (2016)
  - Total: 38
- Time zone: UTC+3:30 (IRST)

Kushk-e Bala (Persian: كوشك بالا) (Note: Also romanized as Kūshḵ-e Bālā) is a village in Adaran Rural District of Asara District in Karaj County, Alborz province, Iran.

== Demographics ==
=== Population ===
At the time of the 2006 National Census, the village's population was 174 in 45 households, when it was in Tehran province. The 2016 census measured the population of the village as 38 people in 14 households, by which time the county had been separated from the province in the establishment of Alborz province.
