= Tasisat Sadamirkebir =

Village in Alborz province, Iran

Tasisat Sadamirkebir Persian: تأسيسات سداميركبير
- Village
- Location within Iran
- Country: Iran
- Province: Alborz
- County: Karaj
- District: Asara
- Rural District: Adaran

Population (2016)
  - Total: 47
- Time zone: UTC+3:30 (IRST)

Tasisat Sadamirkebir (Persian: تأسيسات سداميركبير) (Note: Also romanized as Ta'sīsāt Sadamīrḵebīr and Ta'sīsāt-e Sadd-e Aamīrkabīr) is a village in Adaran Rural District of Asara District in Karaj County, Alborz province, Iran.

== Demographics ==
=== Population ===
At the time of the 2006 National Census, the village's population was 139 in 34 households, when it was in Tehran province. The 2016 census measured the population of the village as 47 people in 13 households, by which time the county had been separated from the province in the establishment of Alborz province.
