= Leylestan =

Village in Alborz province, Iran

Leylestan Persian: ليلستان
- Village
- Location within Iran
- Coordinates: 36°04′00″N 51°07′35″E
- Country: Iran
- Province: Alborz
- County: Karaj
- District: Asara
- Rural District: Adaran

Population (2016)
  - Total: 219
- Time zone: UTC+3:30 (IRST)

Leylestan (Persian: ليلستان) (Note: Also romanized as Leylestān) is a village in Adaran Rural District of Asara District in Karaj County, Alborz province, Iran.

== Demographics ==
=== Population ===
At the time of the 2006 National Census, the village's population was 284 in 73 households, when it was in Tehran province. The 2016 census measured the population of the village as 219 people in 76 households, by which time the county had been separated from the province in the establishment of Alborz province.
