= Nowjan =

Village in Alborz province, Iran

Nowjan Persian: نوجان
- Village
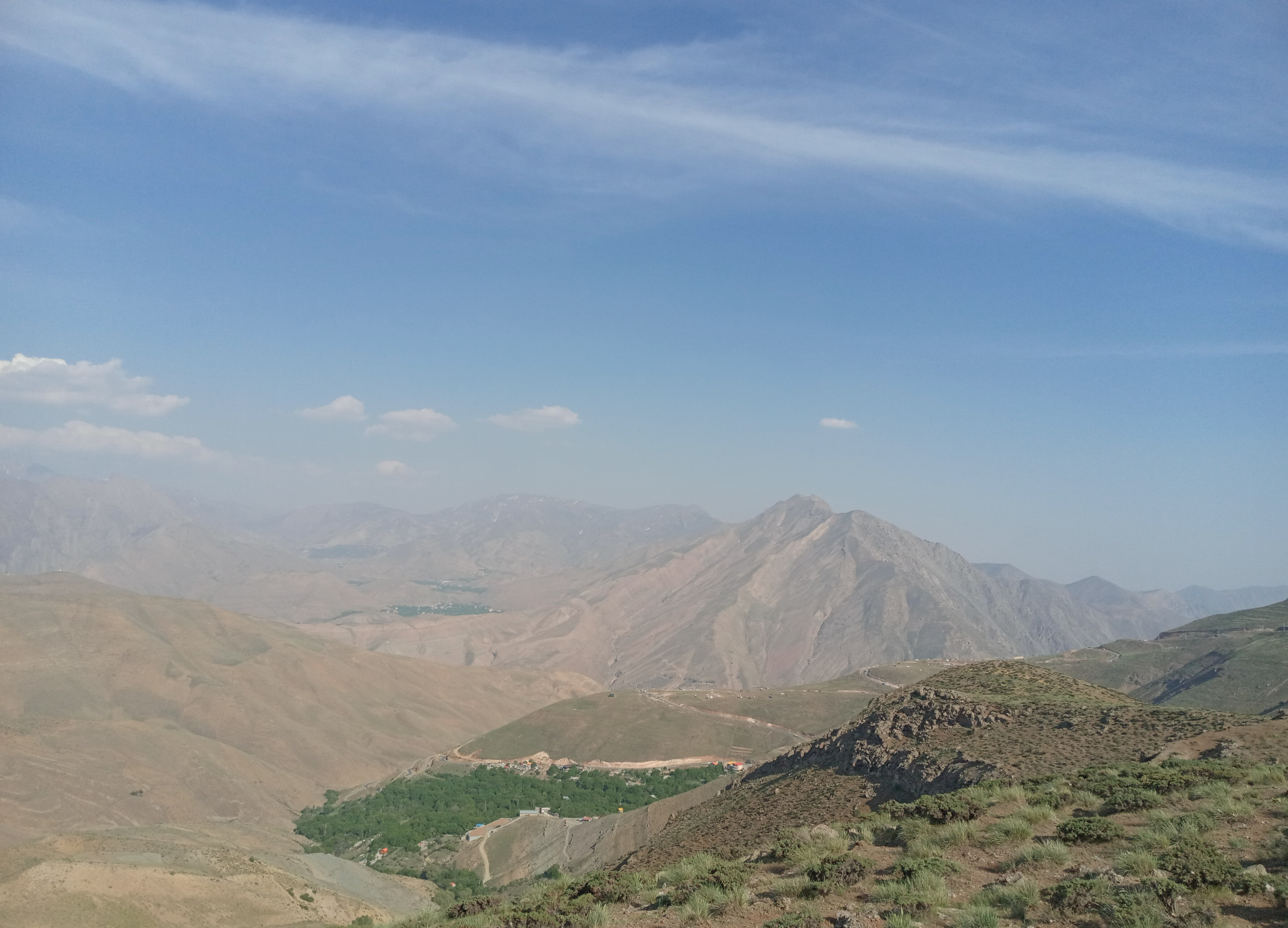
- The village of Nowjan

- Location within Iran
- Coordinates: 35°55′58″N 51°01′15″E
- Country: Iran
- Province: Alborz
- County: Karaj
- District: Asara
- Rural District: Adaran

Population (2016)
  - Total: 59
- Time zone: UTC+3:30 (IRST)

Nowjan (Persian: نوجان) (Note: Also romanized as Nowjān and Nūjān; also known as Tūjān) is a village in Adaran Rural District of Asara District in Karaj County, Alborz province, Iran.

== Demographics ==
=== Population ===
At the time of the 2006 National Census, the village's population was 328 in 98 households, when it was in Tehran province. The 2016 census measured the population of the village as 59 people in 21 households, by which time the county had been separated from the province in the establishment of Alborz province.
