= Ayegan =

Village in Alborz province, Iran

Ayegan Persian: ايگان
- Village
- Location within Iran
- Coordinates: 36°04′05″N 51°07′48″E
- Country: Iran
- Province: Alborz
- County: Karaj
- District: Asara
- Rural District: Adaran

Population (2016)
  - Total: 186
- Time zone: UTC+3:30 (IRST)

Ayegan (Persian: ايگان) (Note: Also romanized as Āyegān) is a village in Adaran Rural District of Asara District in Karaj County, Alborz province, Iran.

== Demographics ==
=== Population ===
At the time of the 2006 National Census, the village's population was 198 in 59 households, when it was in Tehran province. The 2016 census measured the population of the village as 186 people in 69 households, by which time the county had been separated from the province in the establishment of Alborz province.
