= Kalha =

Village in Alborz province, Iran

Kalha Persian: كلها
- Village
- Location within Iran
- Coordinates: 36°04′52″N 51°07′55″E
- Country: Iran
- Province: Alborz
- County: Karaj
- District: Asara
- Rural District: Adaran

Population (2016)
  - Total: 107
- Time zone: UTC+3:30 (IRST)

Kalha (Persian: كلها) (Note: Also romanized as Kalhā) is a village in Adaran Rural District of Asara District in Karaj County, Alborz province, Iran.

== Demographics ==
=== Population ===
At the time of the 2006 National Census, the village's population was 88 in 29 households, when it was in Tehran province. The 2016 census measured the population of the village as 107 people in 40 households, by which time the county had been separated from the province in the establishment of Alborz province.
