= Khuzankola =

Village in Alborz province, Iran

Khuzankola Persian: خوزنكلا
- Village
- Location within Iran
- Coordinates: 35°56′43″N 51°05′08″E
- Country: Iran
- Province: Alborz
- County: Karaj
- District: Asara
- Rural District: Adaran

Population (2016)
  - Total: 1,360
- Time zone: UTC+3:30 (IRST)

Khuzankola (Persian: خوزنكلا) (Note: Also romanized as Khūzan Kalā and Khūzankolā; also known as Khozan Kolah and Khūzan-e Kalāyeh) is a village in Adaran Rural District of Asara District in Karaj County, Alborz province, Iran.

== Demographics ==
=== Population ===
At the time of the 2006 National Census, the village's population was 358 in 114 households, when it was in Tehran province. The 2016 census measured the population of the village as 1360 people in 270 households, by which time the county had been separated from the province in the establishment of Alborz province.
