= Nasht-e Rud =

Village in Alborz province, Iran

Nasht-e Rud Persian: نشترود
- Village
- Location within Iran
- Coordinates: 36°02′11″N 51°07′29″E
- Country: Iran
- Province: Alborz
- County: Karaj
- District: Asara
- Rural District: Adaran

Population (2016)
  - Total: 188
- Time zone: UTC+3:30 (IRST)

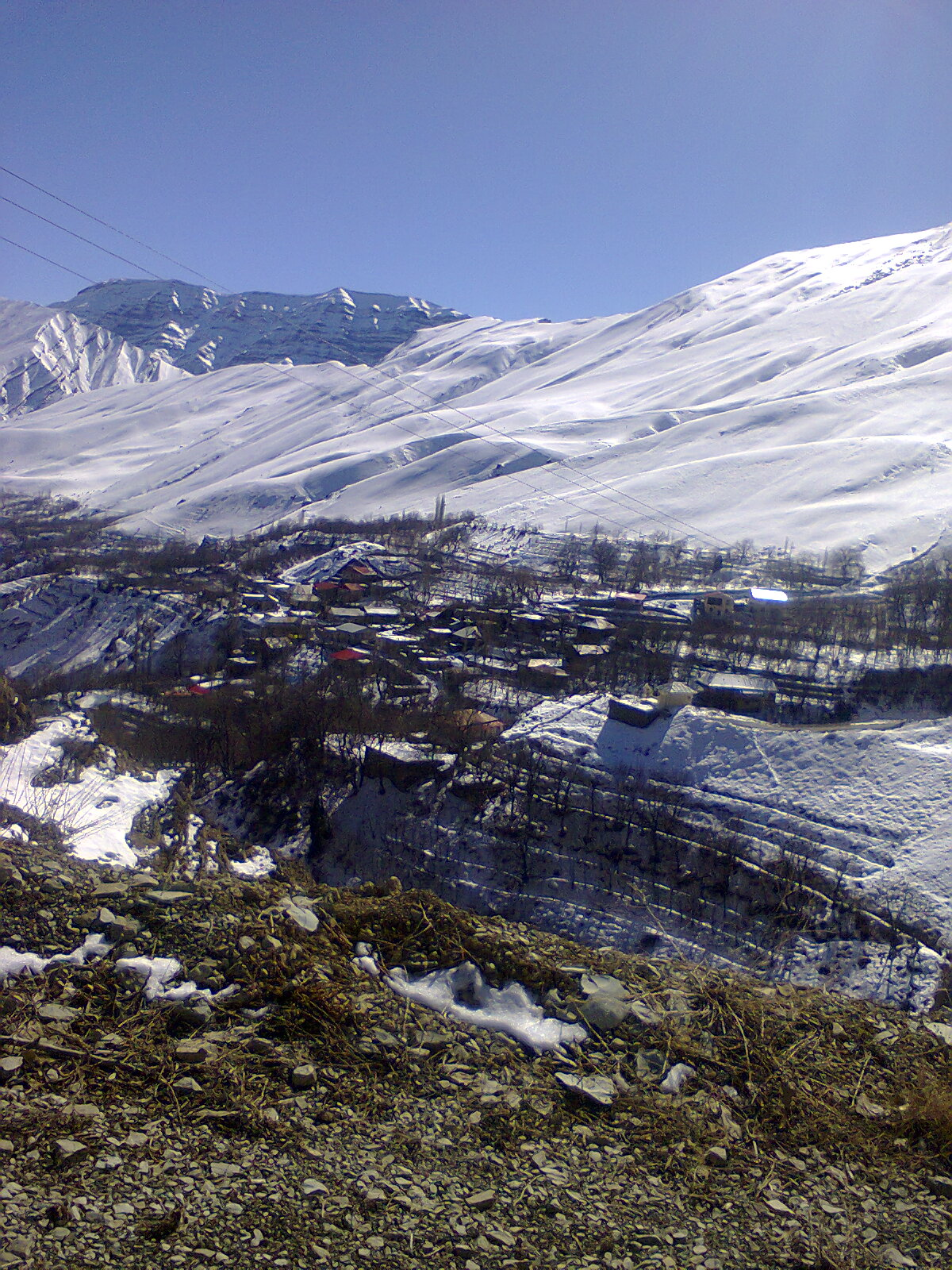
Nasht-e Rud village

Nasht-e Rud (Persian: نشترود) (Note: Also romanized as Nashest Rūd and Nasht-e Rūd) is a village in Adaran Rural District of Asara District in Karaj County, Alborz province, Iran.

== Demographics ==
=== Population ===
At the time of the 2006 National Census, the village's population was 91 in 25 households, when it was in Tehran province. The 2016 census measured the population of the village as 188 people in 68 households, by which time the county had been separated from the province in the establishment of Alborz province.
