= Vineh, Alborz =

Village in Alborz province, Iran

Vineh Persian: وينه
- Village
- Location within Iran
- Coordinates: 35°54′04″N 51°02′34″E
- Country: Iran
- Province: Alborz
- County: Karaj
- District: Asara
- Rural District: Adaran

Population (2016)
  - Total: 143
- Time zone: UTC+3:30 (IRST)

Vineh (Persian: وينه) (Note: Also romanized as Vīneh and Wīneh) is a village in Adaran Rural District of Asara District in Karaj County, Alborz province, Iran.

== Demographics ==
=== Population ===
At the time of the 2006 National Census, the village's population was 201 in 62 households, when it was in Tehran province. The 2016 census measured the population of the village as 143 people in 51 households, by which time the county had been separated from the province in the establishment of Alborz province.
