= Charan, Iran =

Village in Alborz province, Iran

Charan Persian: چاران
- Village
- Location within Iran
- Coordinates: 35°54′35″N 51°07′25″E
- Country: Iran
- Province: Alborz
- County: Karaj
- District: Asara
- Rural District: Adaran

Population (2016)
  - Total: 308
- Time zone: UTC+3:30 (IRST)

Charan (Persian: چاران) (Note: Also romanized as Chārān; also known as Jārān) is a village in Adaran Rural District of Asara District in Karaj County, Alborz province, Iran.

== Demographics ==
=== Population ===
At the time of the 2006 National Census, the village's population was 528 in 143 households, when it was in Tehran province. The 2016 census measured the population of the village as 308 people in 162 households, by which time the county had been separated from the province in the establishment of Alborz province.

Charan is situated among a cluster of villages located in the Alborz mountain range north of Tehran. The primary access is from the Chalus Road shortly before ascending towards the Kandivan Tunnel and Karaj Dam.
