= Sarv Dar =

Village in Alborz province, Iran

Sarv Dar Persian: سرودار
- Village
- Location within Iran
- Coordinates: 35°51′41″N 51°03′21″E
- Country: Iran
- Province: Alborz
- County: Karaj
- District: Asara
- Rural District: Adaran

Population (2016)
  - Total: 319
- Time zone: UTC+3:30 (IRST)

Sarv Dar (Persian: سرودار) (Note: Also romanized as Sarūdār Sarv Dār; also known as Sardār-e Pā’īn and Sarvdār-e Pā’īn) is a village in Adaran Rural District of Asara District in Karaj County, Alborz province, Iran.

== Demographics ==
=== Population ===
At the time of the 2006 National Census, the village's population was 347 in 110 households, when it was in Tehran province. The 2016 census measured the population of the village as 319 people in 97 households, by which time the county had been separated from the province in the establishment of Alborz province.
