= Kondor, Alborz =

Village in Alborz province, Iran

Kondor Persian: كندر
- Village
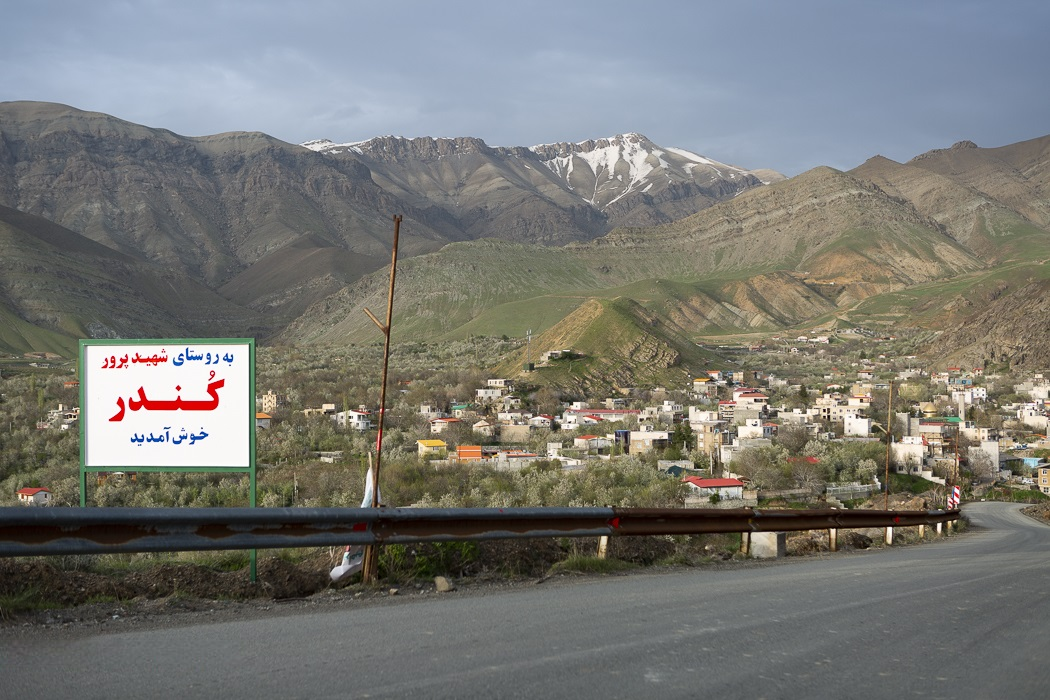
- The village of Kondor

- Location within Iran
- Coordinates: 35°50′46″N 51°06′35″E
- Country: Iran
- Province: Alborz
- County: Karaj
- District: Asara
- Rural District: Adaran

Population (2016)
  - Total: 1,922
- Time zone: UTC+3:30 (IRST)

Kondor (Persian: كندر) (Note: Also romanized as Kondar; also known as Kundar) is a village in Adaran Rural District of Asara District in Karaj County, Alborz province, Iran.

== Demographics ==
=== Population ===
At the time of the 2006 National Census, the village's population was 1,498 in 429 households, when it was in Tehran province. The 2016 census measured the population of the village as 1,922 people in 675 households, by which time the county had been separated from the province in the establishment of Alborz province. Kondor was the most populous village in its rural district.
