= Kalvan, Alborz =

Village in Alborz province, Iran

Kalvan Persian: كلوان
- Village
- Location within Iran
- Coordinates: 36°04′19″N 51°07′12″E
- Country: Iran
- Province: Alborz
- County: Karaj
- District: Asara
- Rural District: Adaran

Population (2016)
  - Total: 650
- Time zone: UTC+3:30 (IRST)

Kalvan (Persian: كلوان) (Note: Also romanized as Kalvān) is a village in Adaran Rural District of Asara District in Karaj County, Alborz province, Iran.

== Demographics ==
=== Population ===
At the time of the 2006 National Census, the village's population was 592 in 156 households, when it was in Tehran province. The 2016 census measured the population of the village as 650 people in 224 households, by which time the county had been separated from the province in the establishment of Alborz province.
