= Varzan =

Village in Alborz province, Iran

Varzan Persian: ورزن
- Village
- Location within Iran
- Coordinates: 36°02′51″N 51°07′16″E
- Country: Iran
- Province: Alborz
- County: Karaj
- District: Asara
- Rural District: Adaran

Population (2016)
  - Total: 124
- Time zone: UTC+3:30 (IRST)

Varzan (Persian: ورزن) is a village in Adaran Rural District of Asara District in Karaj County, Alborz province, Iran.

== Demographics ==
=== Population ===
At the time of the 2006 National Census, the village's population was 287 in 83 households, when it was in Tehran province. The 2016 census measured the population of the village as 124 people in 41 households, by which time the county had been separated from the province in the establishment of Alborz province.
