= Abharak =

Village in Alborz province, Iran

Abharak Persian: ابهرک
- Village
- Location within Iran
- Coordinates: 35°55′24″N 51°05′12″E
- Country: Iran
- Province: Alborz
- County: Karaj
- District: Asara
- Rural District: Adaran

Population (2016)
  - Total: 90
- Time zone: UTC+3:30 (IRST)

Abharak (Persian: ابهرك) (Note: Also romanized as Abhark) is a village in Adaran Rural District of Asara District in Karaj County, Alborz province, Iran.

== Demographics ==
=== Population ===
At the time of the 2006 National Census, the village's population was 378 in 95 households, when it was in Tehran province. The 2016 census measured the population of the village as 90 people in 27 households, by which time the county had been separated from the province in the establishment of Alborz province.
