= Sar Ziarat, Alborz =

Village in Alborz province, Iran

Sar Ziarat Persian: سرزيارت
- Village
- Location within Iran
- Coordinates: 35°55′16″N 51°06′40″E
- Country: Iran
- Province: Alborz
- County: Karaj
- District: Asara
- Rural District: Adaran

Population (2016)
  - Total: 99
- Time zone: UTC+3:30 (IRST)

Sar Ziarat (Persian: سرزيارت) (Note: Also romanized as Sar Zīārat) is a village in Adaran Rural District of Asara District in Karaj County, Alborz province, Iran.

== Demographics ==
=== Population ===
At the time of the 2006 National Census, the village's population was 249 in 76 households, when it was in Tehran province. The 2016 census measured the population of the village as 99 people in 43 households, by which time the county had been separated from the province in the establishment of Alborz province.
