= Adaran, Alborz =

Village in Alborz province, Iran

Adaran Persian: آدران
- Village
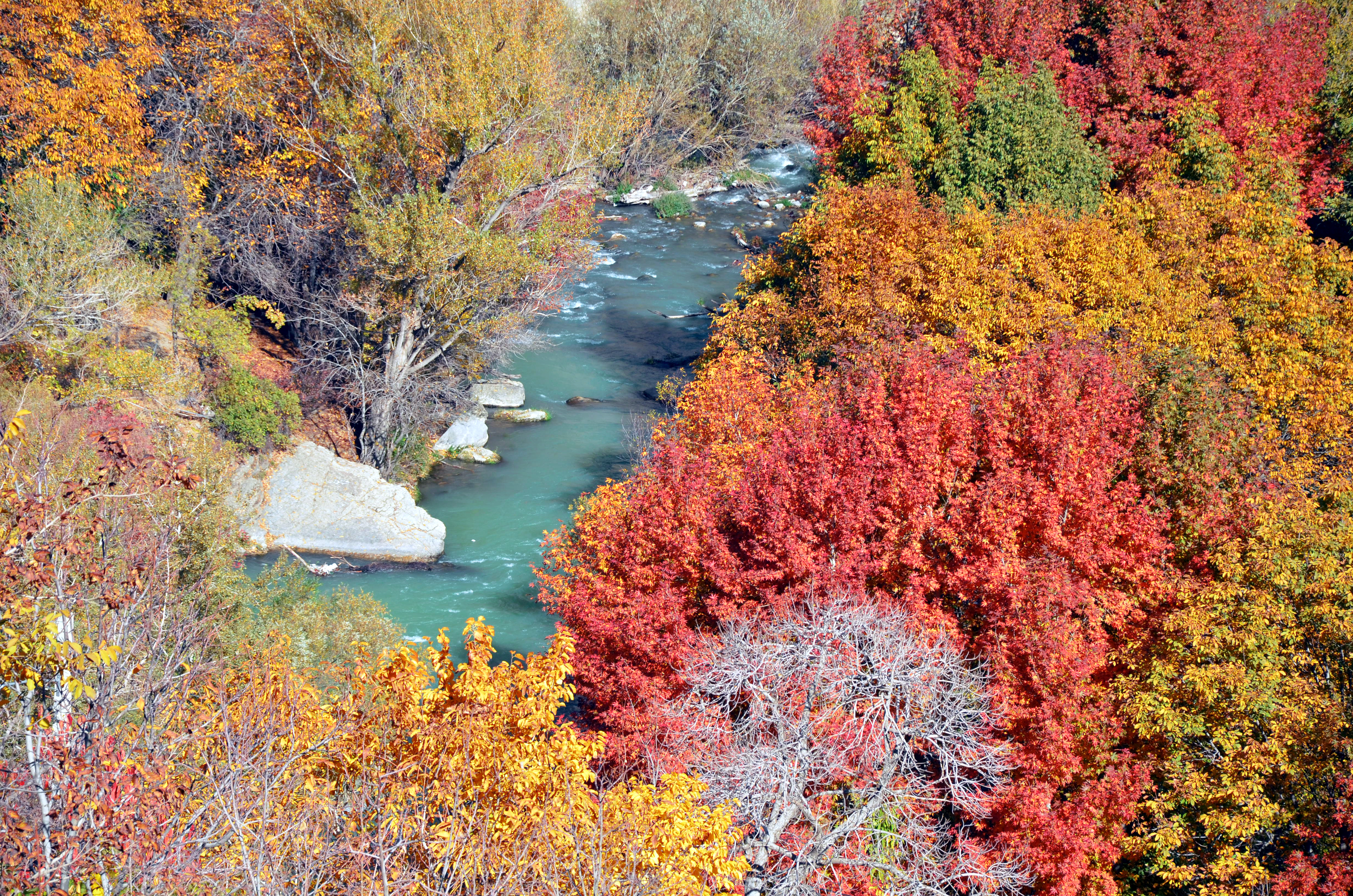
- Karaj River

- Location within Iran
- Coordinates: 35°56′13″N 51°04′13″E
- Country: Iran
- Province: Alborz
- County: Karaj
- District: Asara
- Rural District: Adaran

Population (2016)
  - Total: 391
- Time zone: UTC+3:30 (IRST)

Adaran (Persian: آدران) (Note: Also romanized as Ādarān and Adrān) is a village in, and the capital of, Adaran Rural District in Asara District of Karaj County, Alborz province, Iran.

== Demographics ==
=== Population ===
At the time of the 2006 National Census, the village's population was 581 in 192 households, when it was in Tehran province. The 2016 census measured the population of the village as 391 people in 138 households, by which time the county had been separated from the province in the establishment of Alborz province.
