= Gurab, Alborz =

Village in Alborz province, Iran

Gurab Persian: گوراب
- Village
- Location within Iran
- Coordinates: 35°55′17″N 51°05′35″E
- Country: Iran
- Province: Alborz
- County: Karaj
- District: Asara
- Rural District: Adaran

Population (2016)
  - Total: 147
- Time zone: UTC+3:30 (IRST)

Gurab (Persian: گوراب) (Note: Also romanized as Gūrāb; formerly known as Jurab; also romanized as Jūrāb) is a village in Adaran Rural District of Asara District in Karaj County, Alborz province, Iran.

== Demographics ==
=== Population ===
At the time of the 2006 National Census, the village's population was 185 in 69 households, when it was in Tehran province. The 2016 census measured the population of the village as 147 people in 58 households, by which time the county had been separated from the province in the establishment of Alborz province.
