= Varian, Iran =

Village in Alborz province, Iran

Varian Persian: واريان
- Village
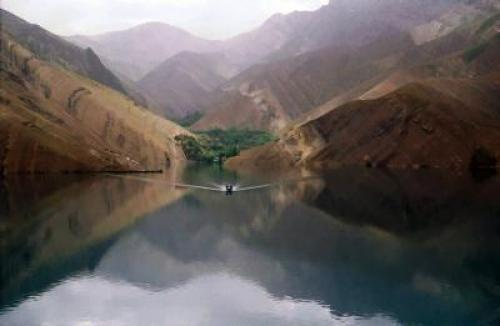
- The waterway leading to Varian

- Location within Iran
- Coordinates: 35°57′55″N 51°06′53″E
- Country: Iran
- Province: Alborz
- County: Karaj
- District: Asara
- Rural District: Adaran

Population (2016)
  - Total: 39
- Time zone: UTC+3:30 (IRST)

Varian (Persian: واريان) (Note: Also romanized as Vārīān, Vārīyān, and Vāryān; also known as Āryān and Vāryān-e Jadīd) is a village in Adaran Rural District of Asara District in Karaj County, Alborz province, Iran.

== Demographics ==
=== Population ===
At the time of the 2006 National Census, the village's population was 238 in 66 households, when it was in Tehran province. The 2016 census measured the population of the village as 39 people in 15 households, by which time the county had been separated from the province in the establishment of Alborz province.
