= Khur, Karaj =

Village in Alborz province, Iran

Khur Persian: خور
- Village
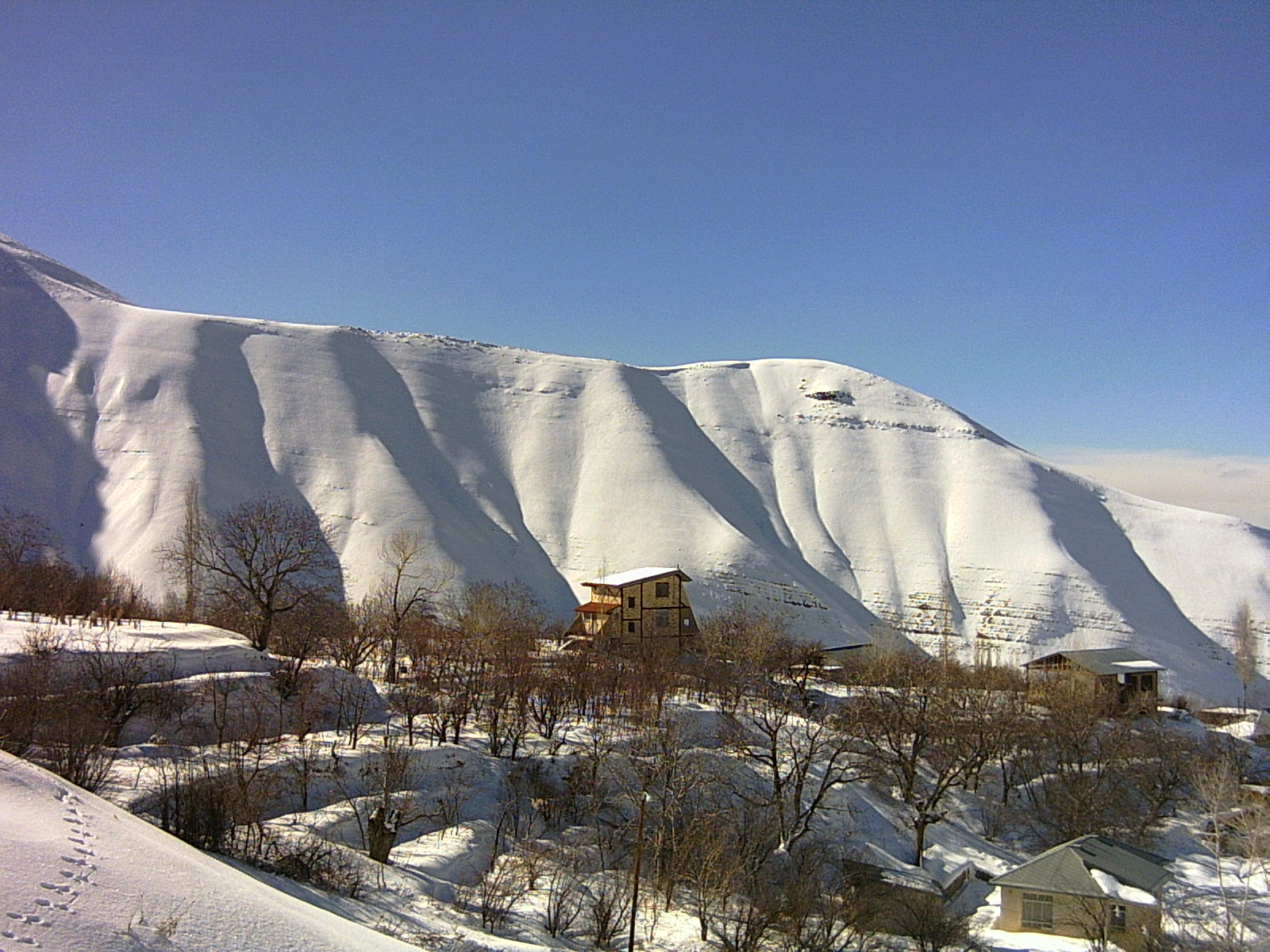

- Location within Iran
- Coordinates: 35°54′54″N 51°09′25″E
- Country: Iran
- Province: Alborz
- County: Karaj
- District: Asara
- Rural District: Adaran

Population (2016)
  - Total: 293
- Time zone: UTC+3:30 (IRST)

Khur (Persian: خور) (Note: Also romanized as Khūr; also known as Gūra) is a village in Adaran Rural District of Asara District in Karaj County, Alborz province, Iran.

== Demographics ==
=== Population ===
At the time of the 2006 National Census, the village's population was 110 in 46 households, when it was in Tehran province. The 2016 census measured the population of the village as 293 people in 107 households, by which time the county had been separated from the province in the establishment of Alborz province.
