= Sijan, Alborz =

Village in Alborz province, Iran

Sijan Persian: سيجان
- Village
- Location within Iran
- Coordinates: 35°55′15″N 51°08′51″E
- Country: Iran
- Province: Alborz
- County: Karaj
- District: Asara
- Rural District: Adaran

Population (2016)
  - Total: 767
- Time zone: UTC+3:30 (IRST)

Sijan (Persian: سيجان) (Note: Also romanized as Sījān) is a village in Adaran Rural District of Asara District in Karaj County, Alborz province, Iran.

== Demographics ==
=== Population ===
At the time of the 2006 National Census, the village's population was 561 in 204 households, when it was in Tehran province. The 2016 census measured the population of the village as 767 people in 253 households, by which time the county had been separated from the province in the establishment of Alborz province.
