= Jey, Iran =

Village in Alborz province, Iran

Jey Persian: جي
- Village
- Location within Iran
- Coordinates: 35°54′57″N 51°06′51″E
- Country: Iran
- Province: Alborz
- County: Karaj
- District: Asara
- Rural District: Adaran

Population (2016)
  - Total: 100
- Time zone: UTC+3:30 (IRST)

Jey (Persian: جي) is a village in Adaran Rural District of Asara District in Karaj County, Alborz province, Iran.

== Demographics ==
=== Population ===
At the time of the 2006 National Census, the village's population was 332 in 113 households, when it was in Tehran province. The 2016 census measured the population of the village as 100 people in 40 households, by which time the county had been separated from the province in the establishment of Alborz province.
