= Khazeni family =

Khazeni Family
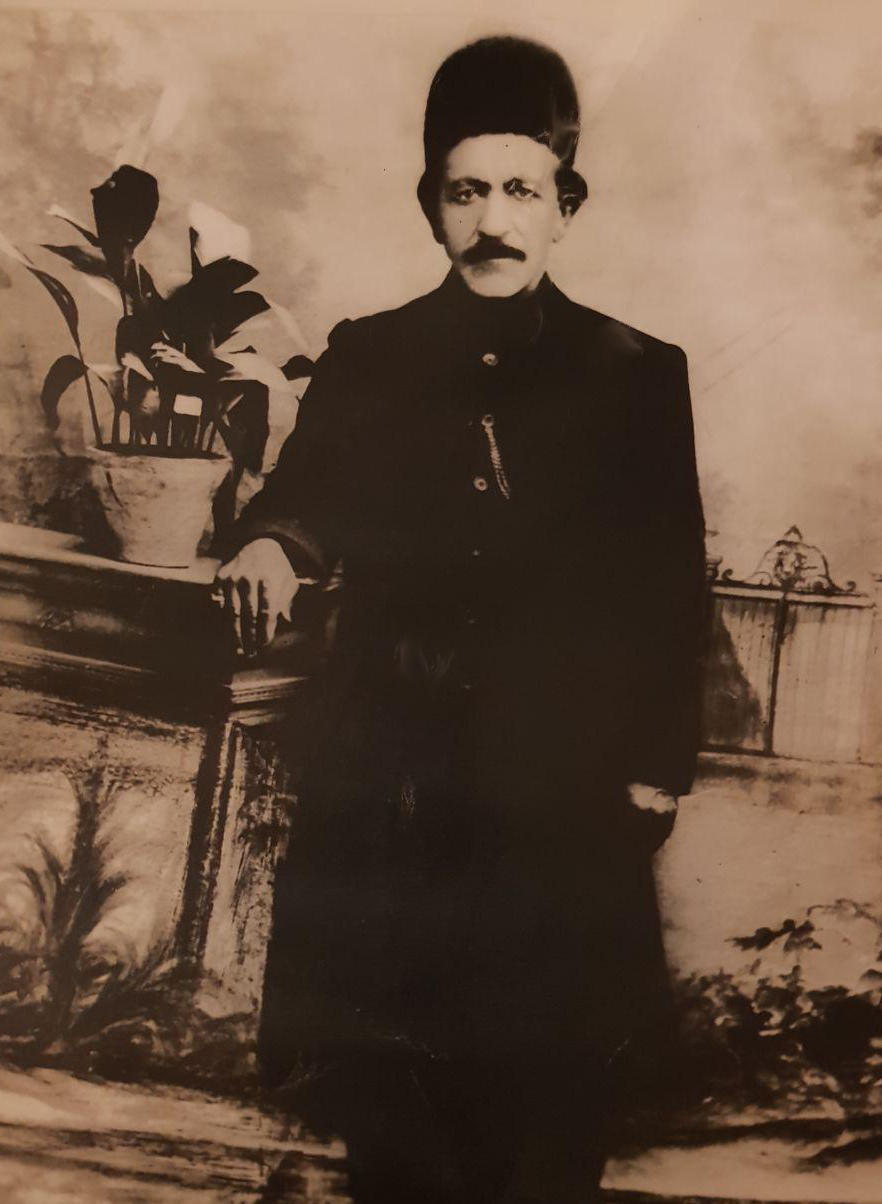
- Current region: Iran, United Arab Emirates, United States, United Kingdom, Australia, Germany,
- Origin: Persia, Qajar dynasty

The Khazeni family (Persian: خازنی), Khazeni-Rad and Khazenifar families were a prominent Iranian industrial and mercantile family, active in Iran from the Qajar dynasty.

Throughout the 20th century, the main activities of the family were the manufacture and distribution of steel and fabric products through its company, The Cheltenham Company, which included the import of Japanese Iron and commodities such as cotton.

== History ==
The Khazeni, Khazeni-Rad, and Khazenifar families have three separate lineages interlinked through bloodlines.

After being known as Khazeni-Allangei (Arrangei) and Abbasian, the families opted to drop the affixes and change the family name at the time of Reza Shah.

The first Tehran resident of the family, Agha Baba Khazeni, is buried at Imamzadeh Abdullah, Rey.

"Agha Khazeni", one of the founding members of the family, is buried at the gateway of Shāh Abdol Azīm Shrine in the city of Rey, south of Tehran.

Before Tehran, the family had a history in Yazd but moved to Tehran province in the 1780s. Recent data reveals the family's history in the central desert city of Yazd, but records are scant.

The Khazeni families of Tehran became well-known and prominent in Tehran by establishing the Japanese stainless steel import lines and helped found a private hospital called Arad General Hospital.

The Cheltenham Company began operating on 21 December 1954 with a board of two directors to become, five years later, one of Iran's largest import companies of Iron commodities. In 1967, the family group created the first industrial pressure gauge importing company in Iran.

In 1977, the company also began investing in Texas but pulled their investments after during 1978 political turmoil in Iran. The company was bought out by a local competitor on March 2, 1981, after the Iranian revolution.

The Abbasian side of the family was known throughout Karaj and Tehran. They were well known for being the first doctors in the Asara area and being one of the more prominent families in Karaj before the revolution. The Abbasian family was split at the time of Reza Shah due to internal disputes, and they are also now known as the Abbasian and Abbasian-Nik families.

== Family Organizations & Companies ==
The Khazeni-Rad side of the family began its expansion into the United Kingdom in the 1960s. The Khazenifar side joined them in creating multiple companies and helped the family move into retail, specialist dental and restaurant companies in northern England. The Khazenis are also based in Qatar, United Arab Emirates and the United States with interests in various other countries.

- In the 20th century, the family diversified into metal imports before moving into construction activities.
- In 1954, the family founded The Cheltenham Company. The company grew to 5 branches across the country, with international branches in Liverpool, Dallas, Rome and Tokyo.
- Arad General Hospital

== Awards ==
Professor Dr. Mohammad Khazenifar Awards for Medical Excellence at Iran's Joint and Bone Science Masters Center in Tehran. Before this, he annually awarded medals of excellence to the best-performing surgeon at the Royal Liverpool University Hospital.

== Recognition & Publications ==
Dr. Sasan Khazenifar has been recognized as for his first-responder duty in the Lancaster Guardian, United Kingdom, for his life-saving skills. At the time, the woman who he saved responded: "He was my life saver, and my mum ran up to him, gave him a big hug and started crying."

In 2022, Dr. Mohammad Khazenifar wrote an autobiography of his life prior to his death about his life growing up in Tehran and family history, called "A Small Section of my Life", published by Behjat Publishing, the book covers aspects of Iran's contemporary history from the point of the family.

== Prominent Family Members ==
- Ali Khan Khazen-ul Molk, member of the aristocracy during the Nasser Naser al-Din Shah Qajar period in the late 19th century.
- Agha Baba Khazeni-Arangei, merchant, manufacturer and importer of spices and large landowner in Tehran, married to Zahra Khanom (Khanom), daughter of Haj Seyyed Ali, large landowner in Iran at the time of Naser al-Din Shah Qajar
- Dr Mohammad Khazenifar, became well known in the 1990s for handing out an award for medical excellence at Liverpool University. Son of Agha Baba Khazeni-Alangei founder of Arad Hospital
- Dr Arash Khazeni, Associate Professor Department of History at Pomona College and PhD from Yale University
- Mohsen Khazeni-Rad, Director of several companies in the United Kingdom
- Dr Sassan Khazenifar, Currently is an Oral and maxillofacial surgery surgeon at Sheffield National Health Service, son of Mohammad Khazenifar
- Reza Ali Khazeni, writer and expert on Iranian history. http://mec.utah.edu/RAK_Lecture.php
- Dr Mohammad Khazeni, Virologist in Tehran medical University TUMS
