= Amir Kabir Dam =

Dam in Alborz, Iran

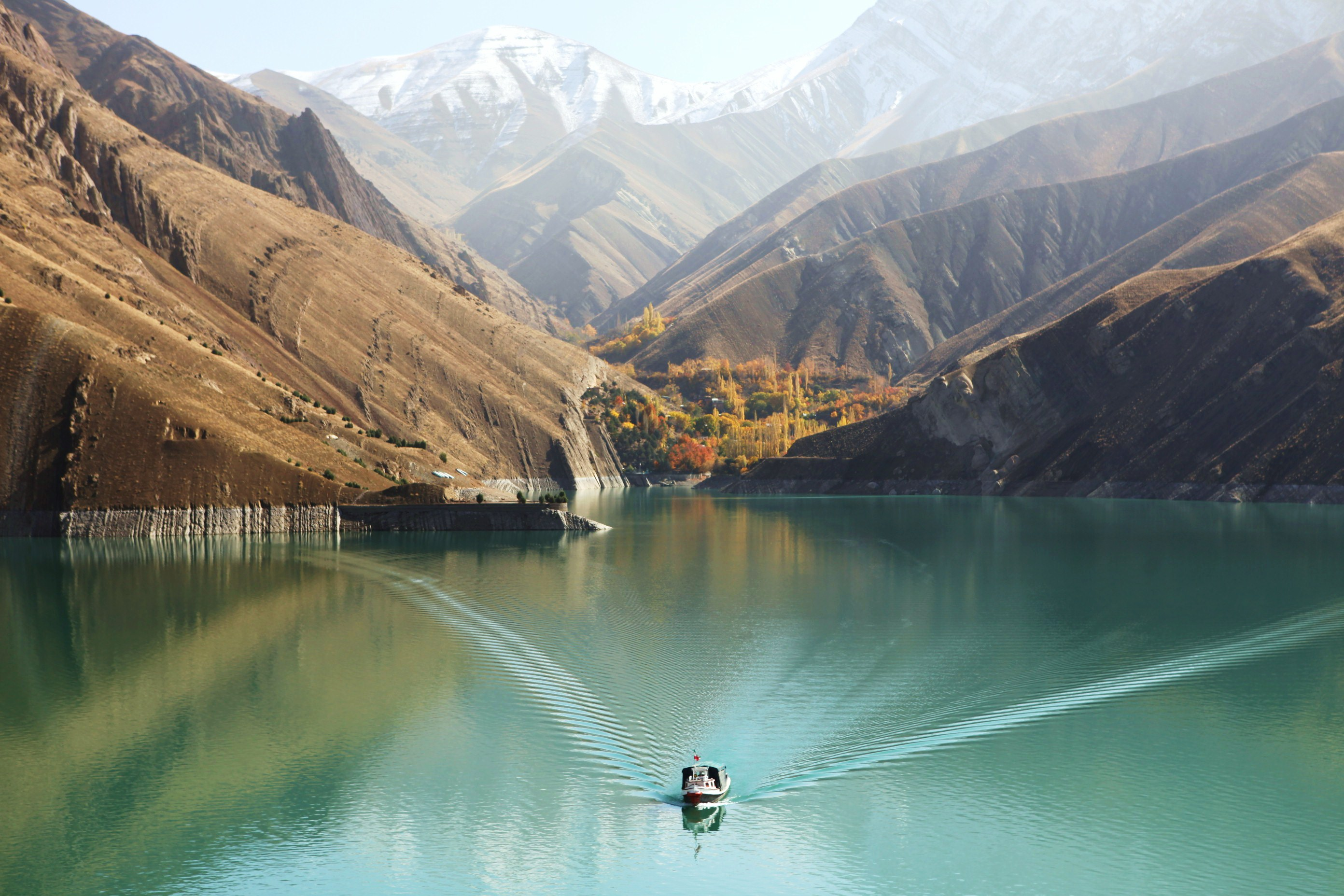
- The upstream view of Amir Kabir Dam
- Interactive map of Amir Kabir Dam
- Country: Iran
- Purpose: Flood control, Irrigation, Water supply, Power
- Status: Operational
- Construction began: 1957
- Opening date: 1961
- Owner: Regional Water Company of Tehran

Dam and spillways
- Impounds: Karaj River
- Height: 180 m (591 ft)
- Length: 390 m (1,280 ft)
- Width (crest): 30 m (98 ft)
- Dam volume: 205 MCM

Reservoir
- Creates: Amir Kabir Lake
- Total capacity: 202,000,000 m^{3} (163,764 acre⋅ft)

Power Station
- Installed capacity: 90 MW
- Website https://thrw.ir/st/61

Amir Kabir Dam (Persian: سد امیرکبیر), also known as Karaj Dam (سد کرج), is a dam on the Karaj River in the Central Alborz mountain range of northern Iran.

It is located 63 kilometres (39 mi) northwest of Tehran and 23 kilometres (14 mi) north of Karaj. The dam was constructed on the Karaj River, and was the first multi-purpose dam in Iran.

== Construction ==
The initial studies for Amir Kabir Dam took 22 years until 1956 when formal proceedings began and the dam was constructed from 1957 to 1961 by Morrison-Knudsen Co. From 1950 Khalil Taleghani took part in the construction process.

Varian village was originally located on the bed of the Amir Kabir Dam and beside the Karaj River. Following the dam's construction, the village was relocated to higher ground. This made the village only accessible by waterway.

== Specifications ==
The ecliptic concrete structure is 180 metres (590 ft) high, with 30 metres (98 ft) length on bottom and 390 metres (1,280 ft) on top and its watershed is 764 kilometres (475 mi) long. The average annual water inflow to its reservoir is 472 million cubic meters. The total capacity of the dam's reservoir is 202 million cubic meters. The bottom elevation of reservoir and normal water surface elevation of the reservoir are 1,545 metres (5,069 ft) and 1,610 metres (5,280 ft) respectively.

== Purpose ==
The Amir Kabir Dam was built as a multi-purpose dam to provide tap water for Tehran alongside agricultural development in Karaj. It supplies the irrigation demand of over 50,000 hectares (120,000 acres) of farmland near Karaj. The power plant has been connected to the national electricity network for over 46 years and has a capacity of 90 megawatts. The lake behind the dam is a touristic attraction while being a natural habitat for rainbow trout. With its sailing and water-skiing facilities, the dam is a popular weekend summer resort.

== Gallery ==
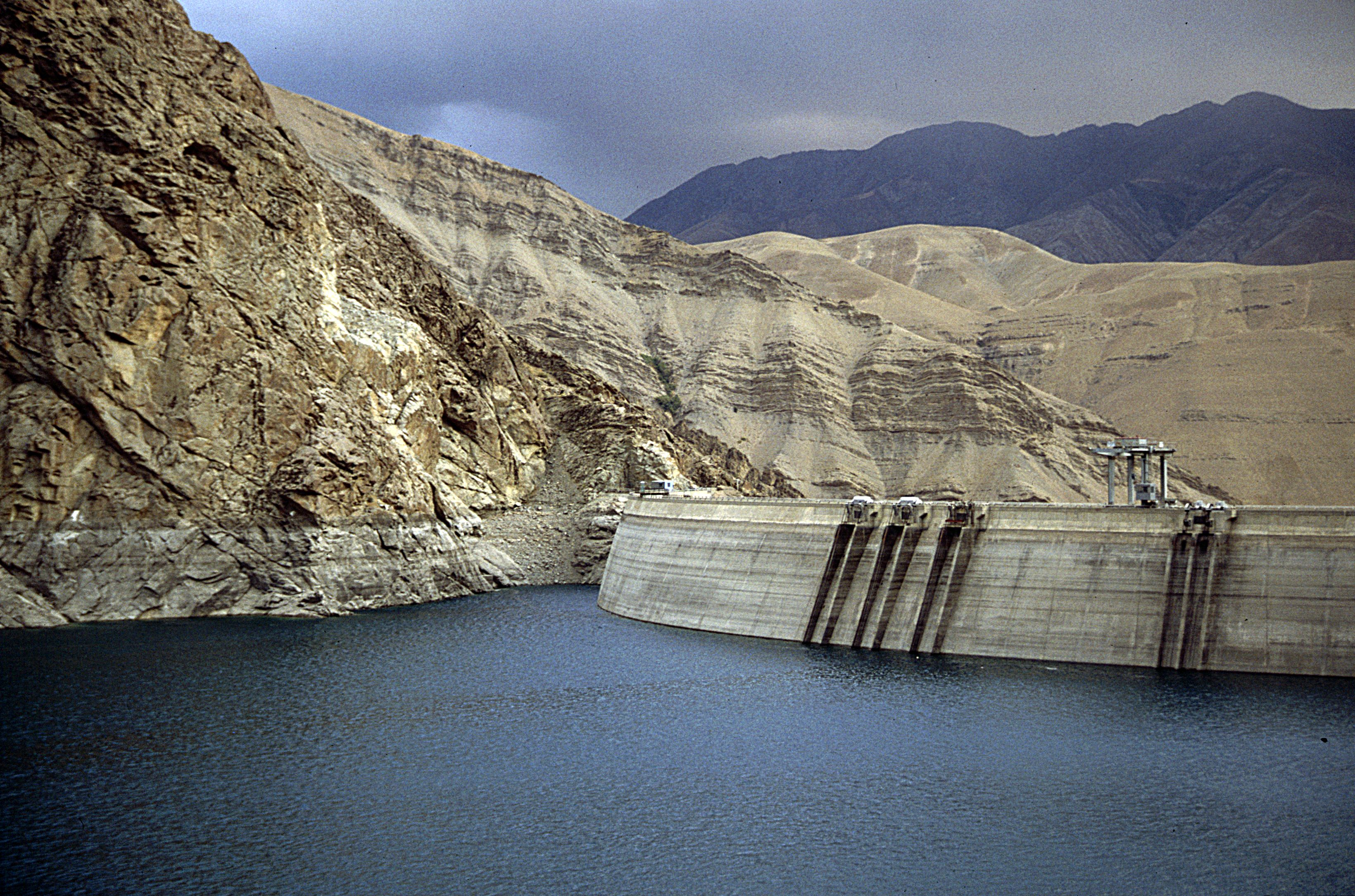
The structure of the dam

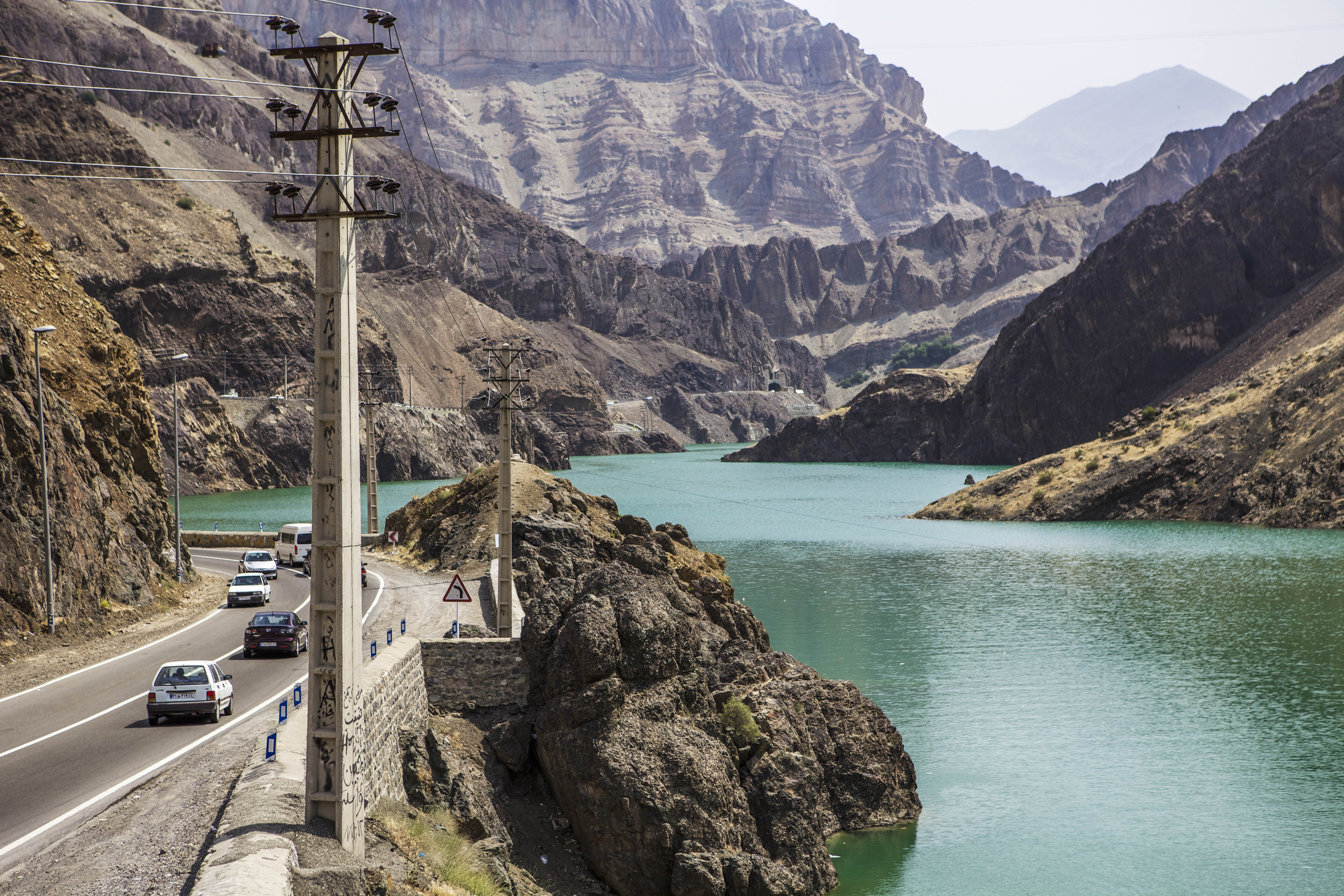
Chalus Road beside dam

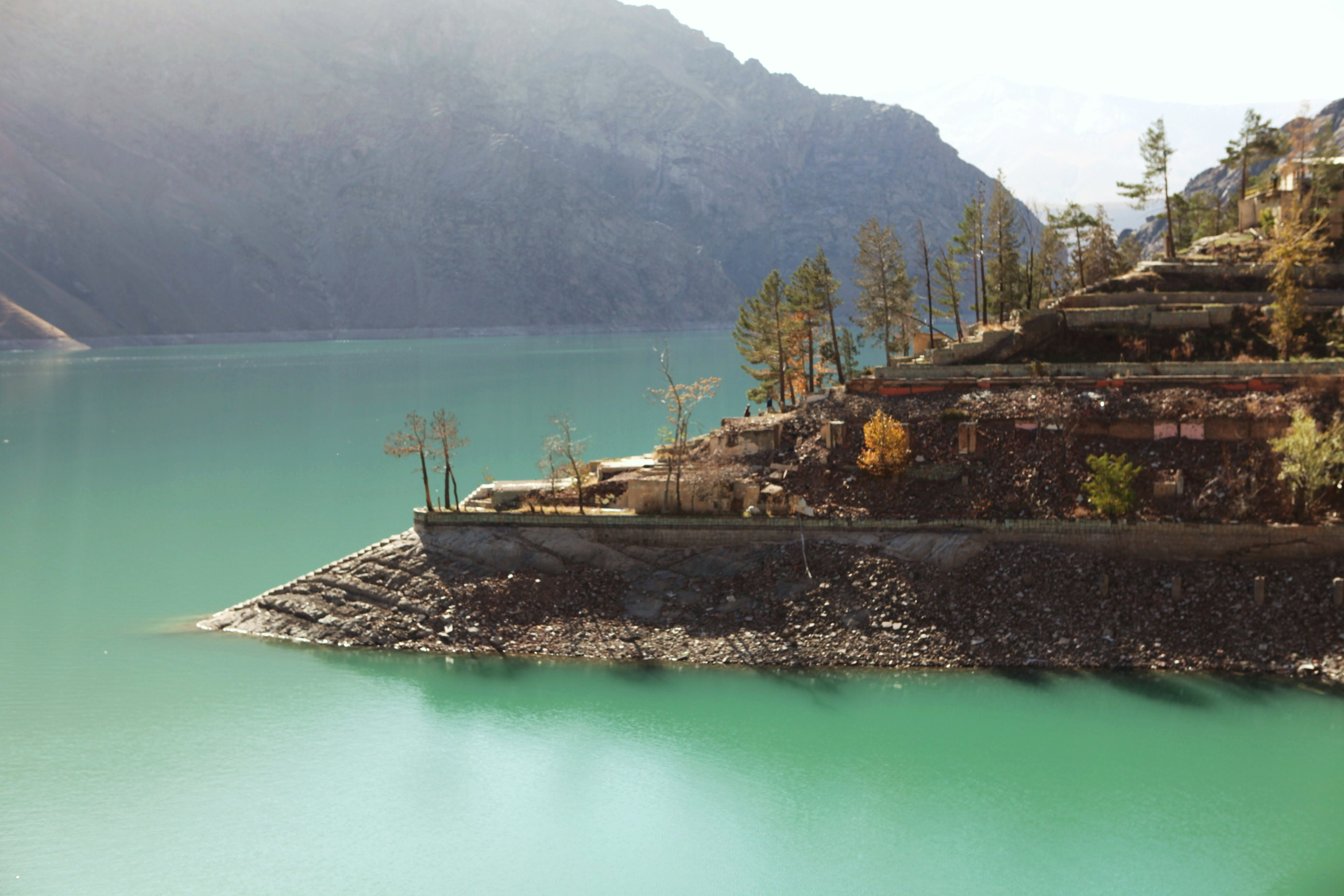
The dam's lake

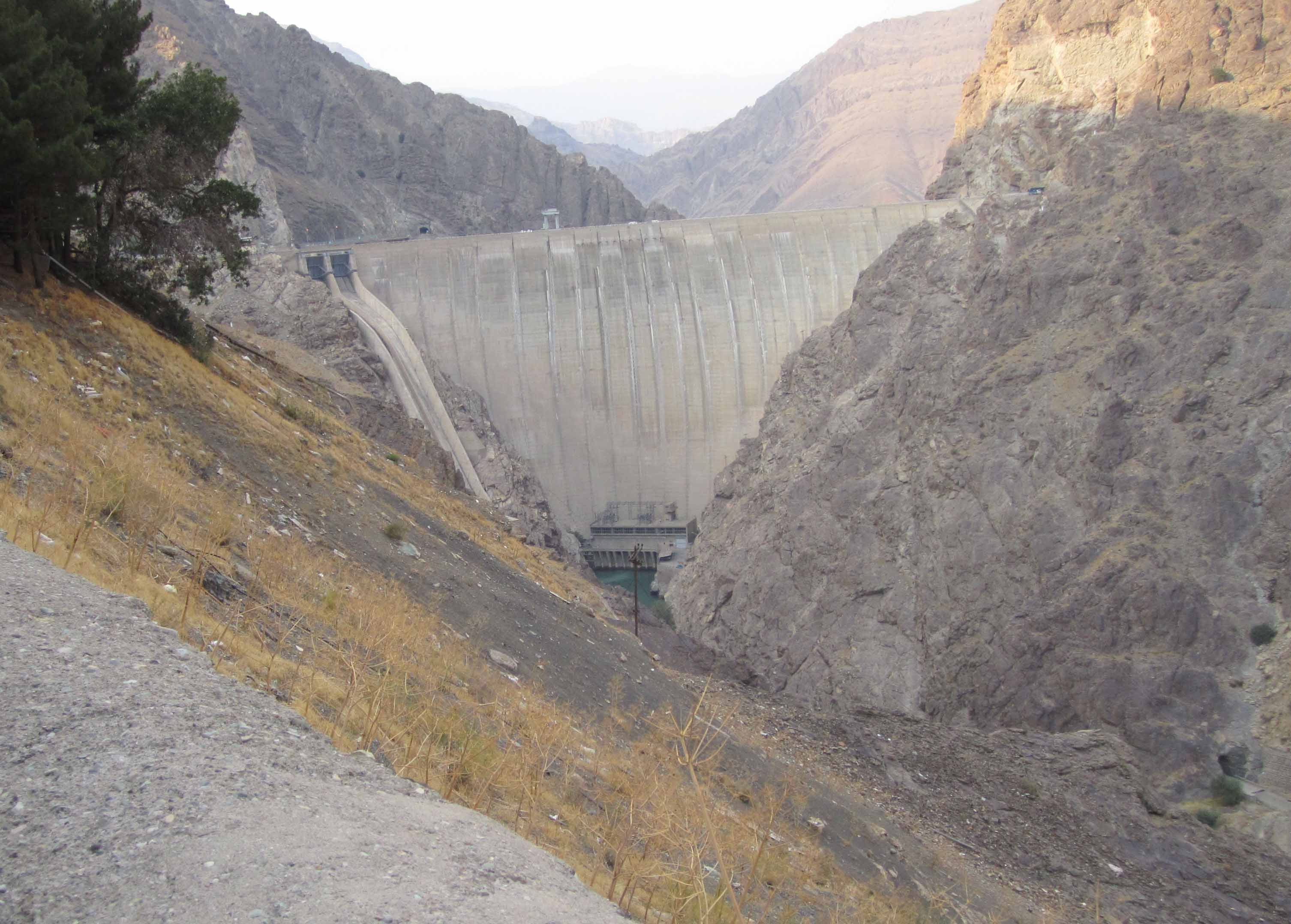
The structure of the dam

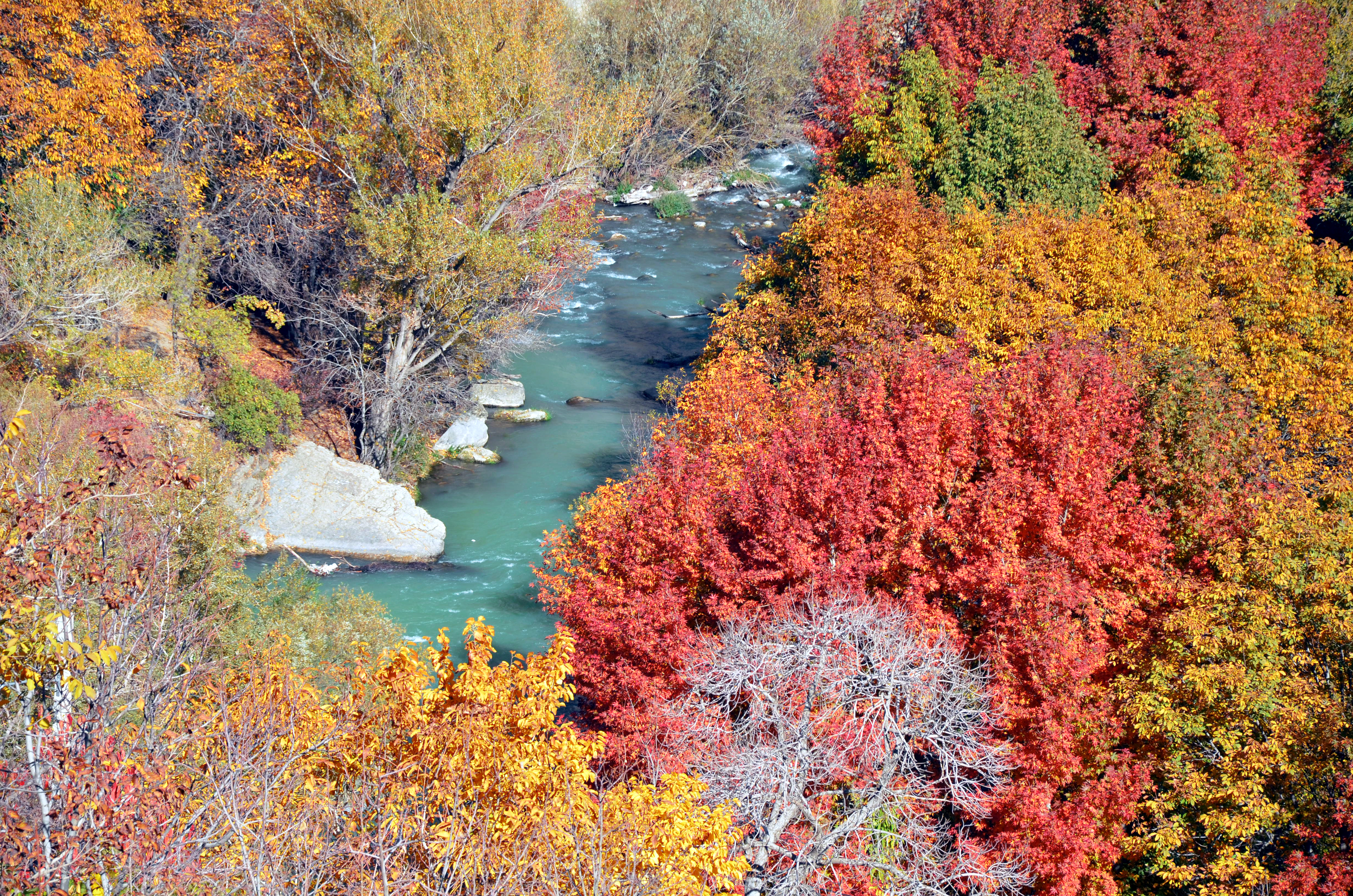
Karaj River in Adaran

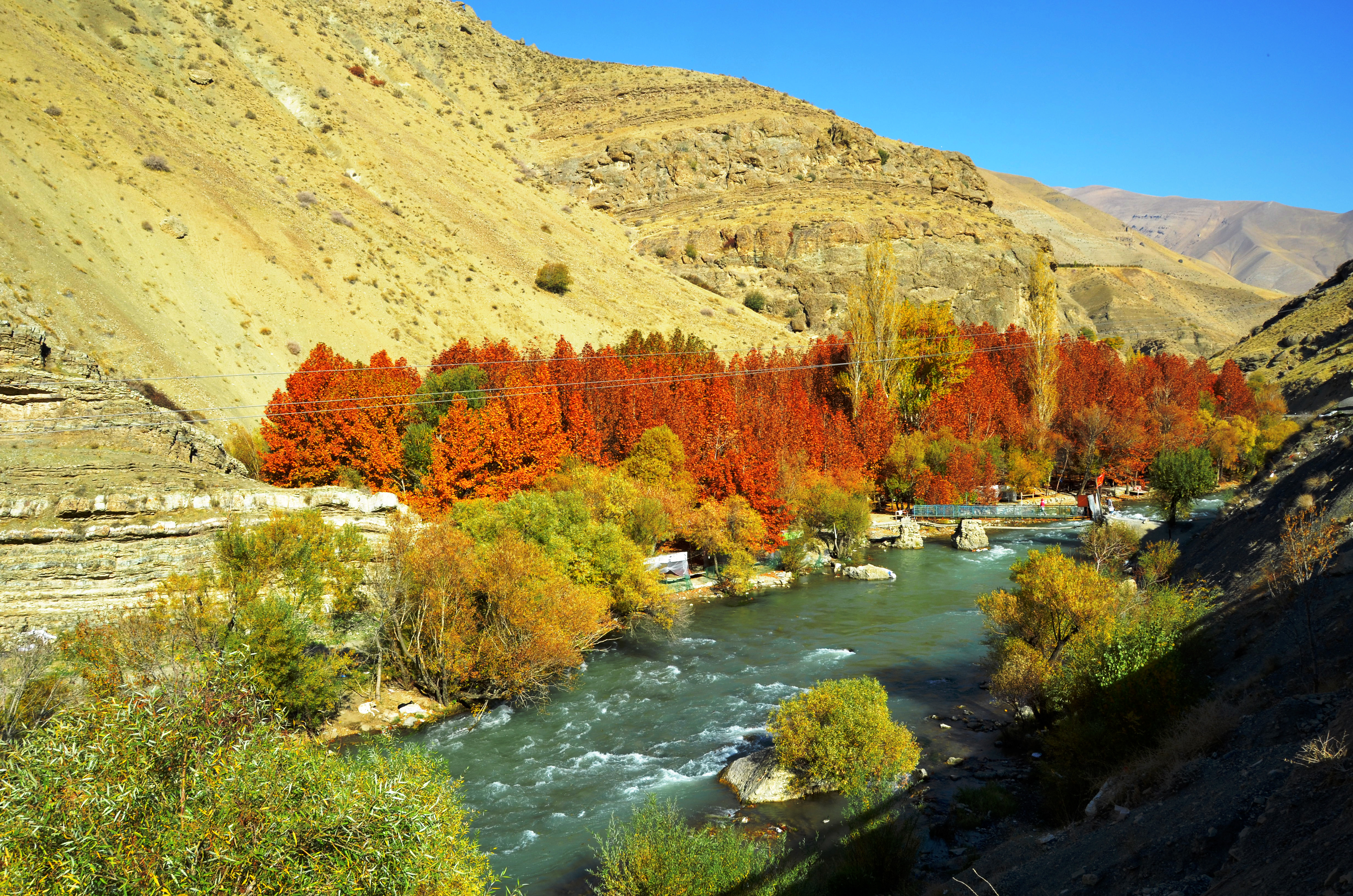
Karaj River

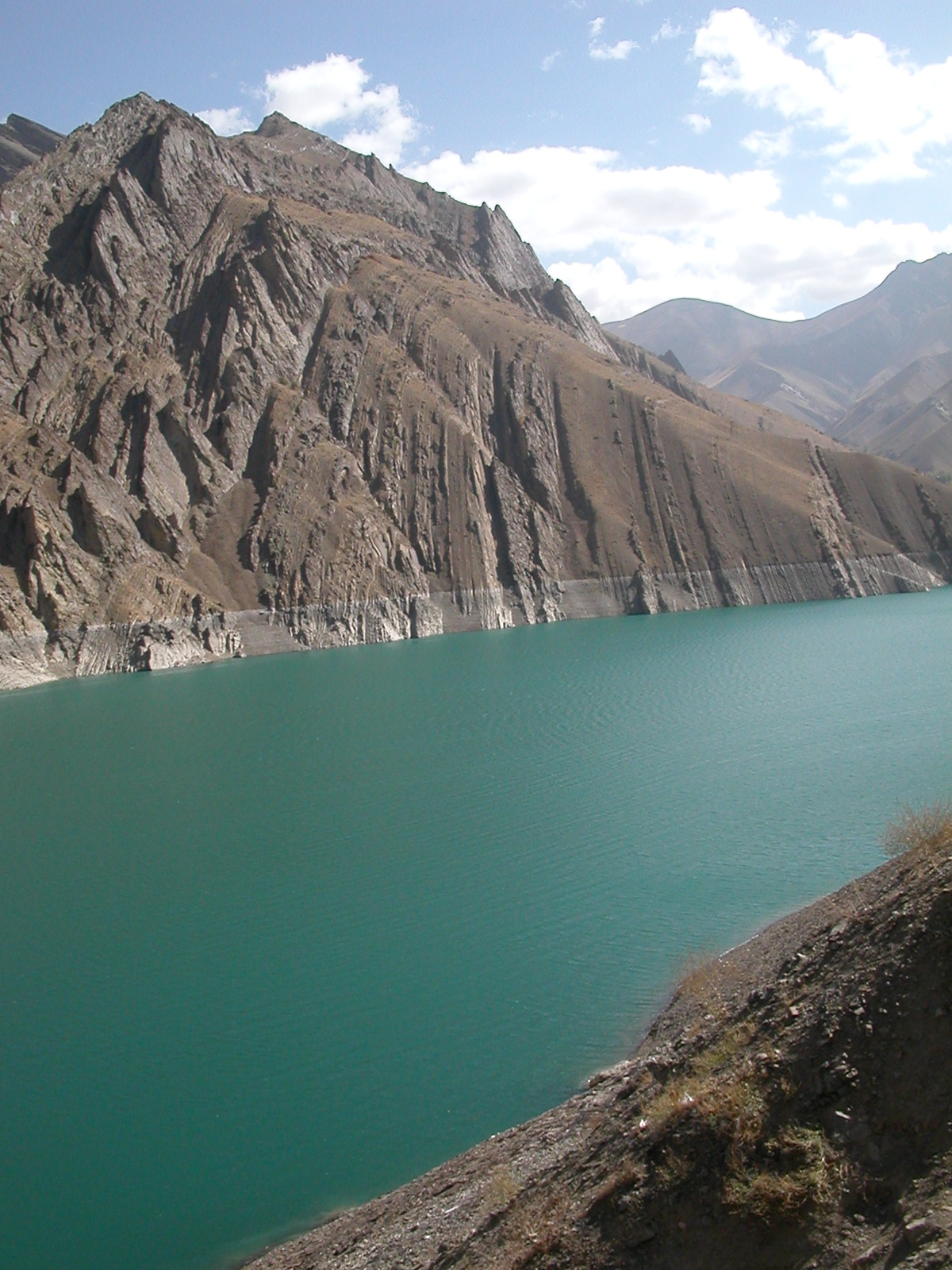
Karaj dam or Amir Kabir dam

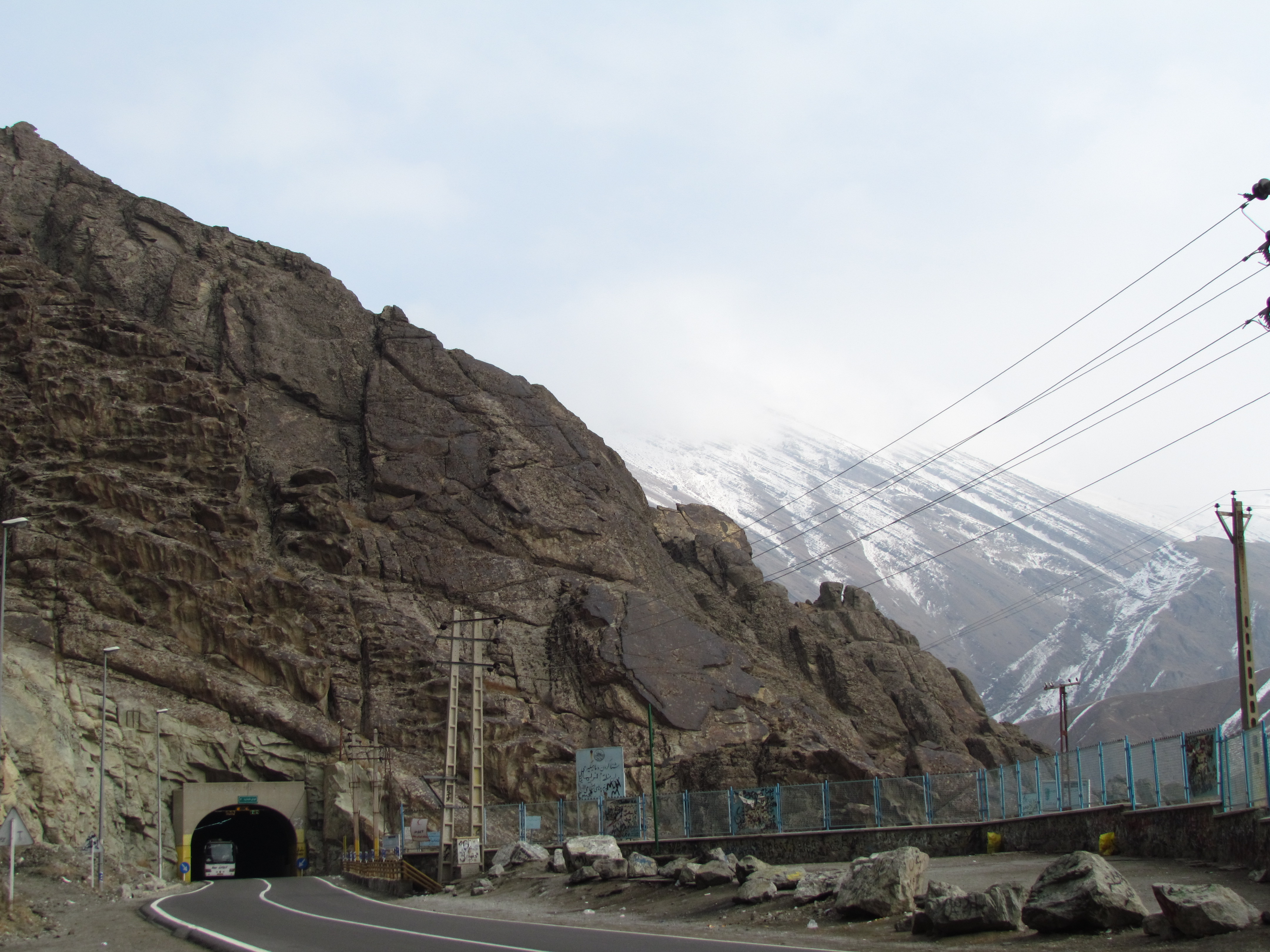
Chalus Road beside the dam

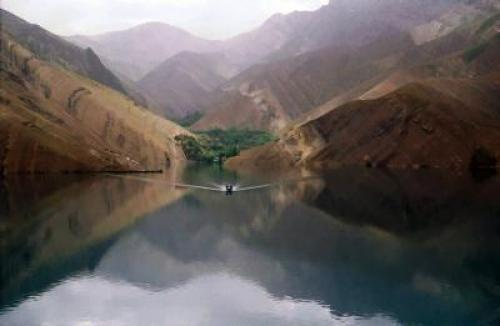
Varian Village behind the dam's lake

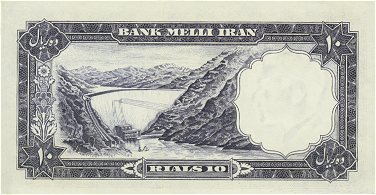
Amir Kabir dam on the reverse of a 1961 10 Iranian rial banknote

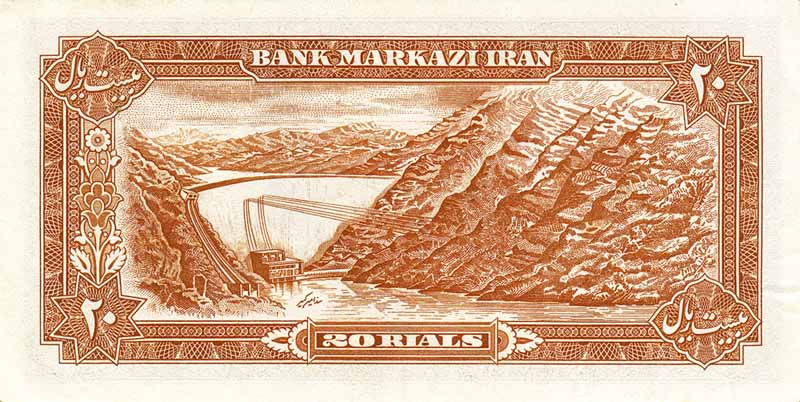
Amir Kabir dam on the reverse of a 1974 20 Iranian rial banknote

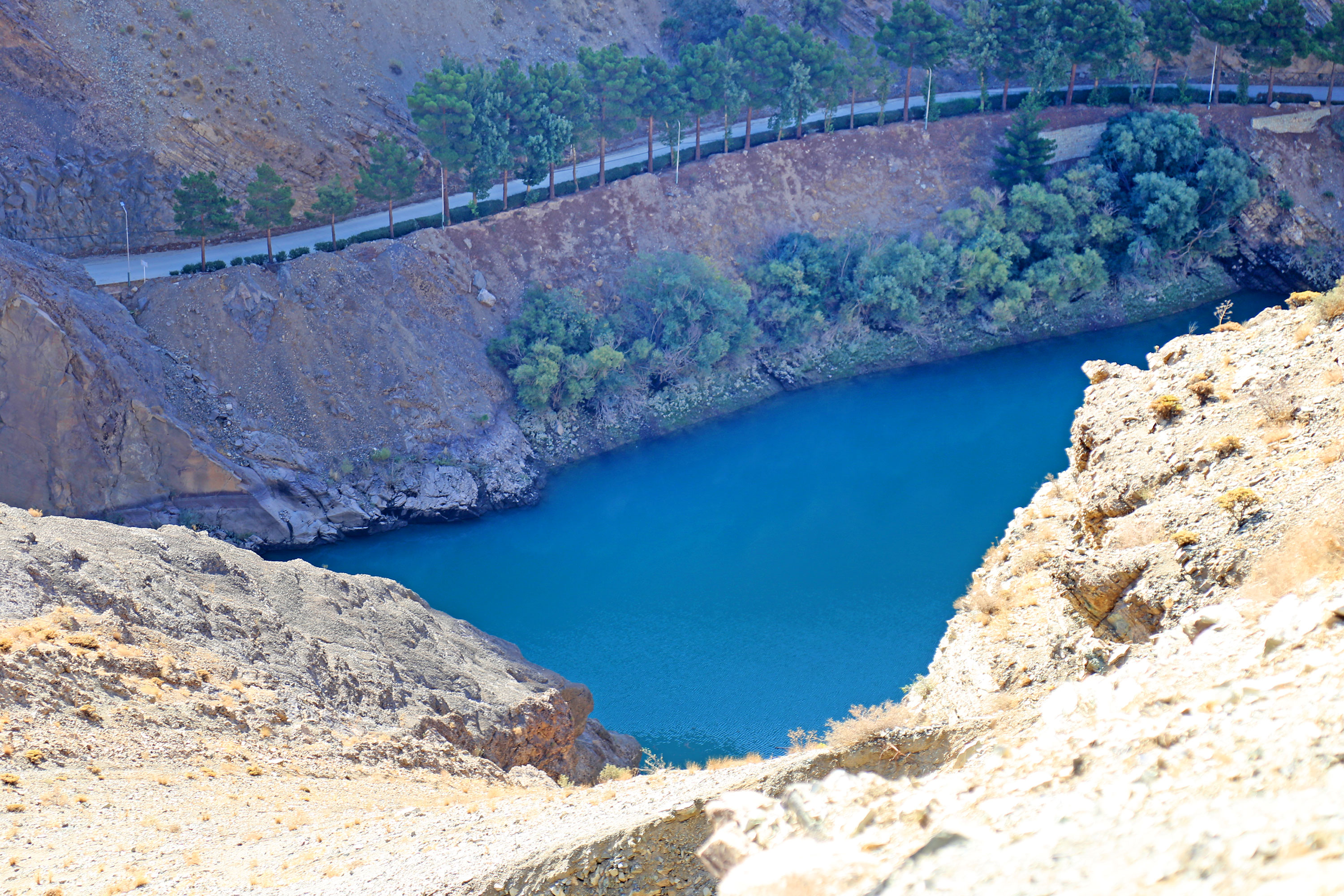
Karaj Dam, Alborz Province, Iran

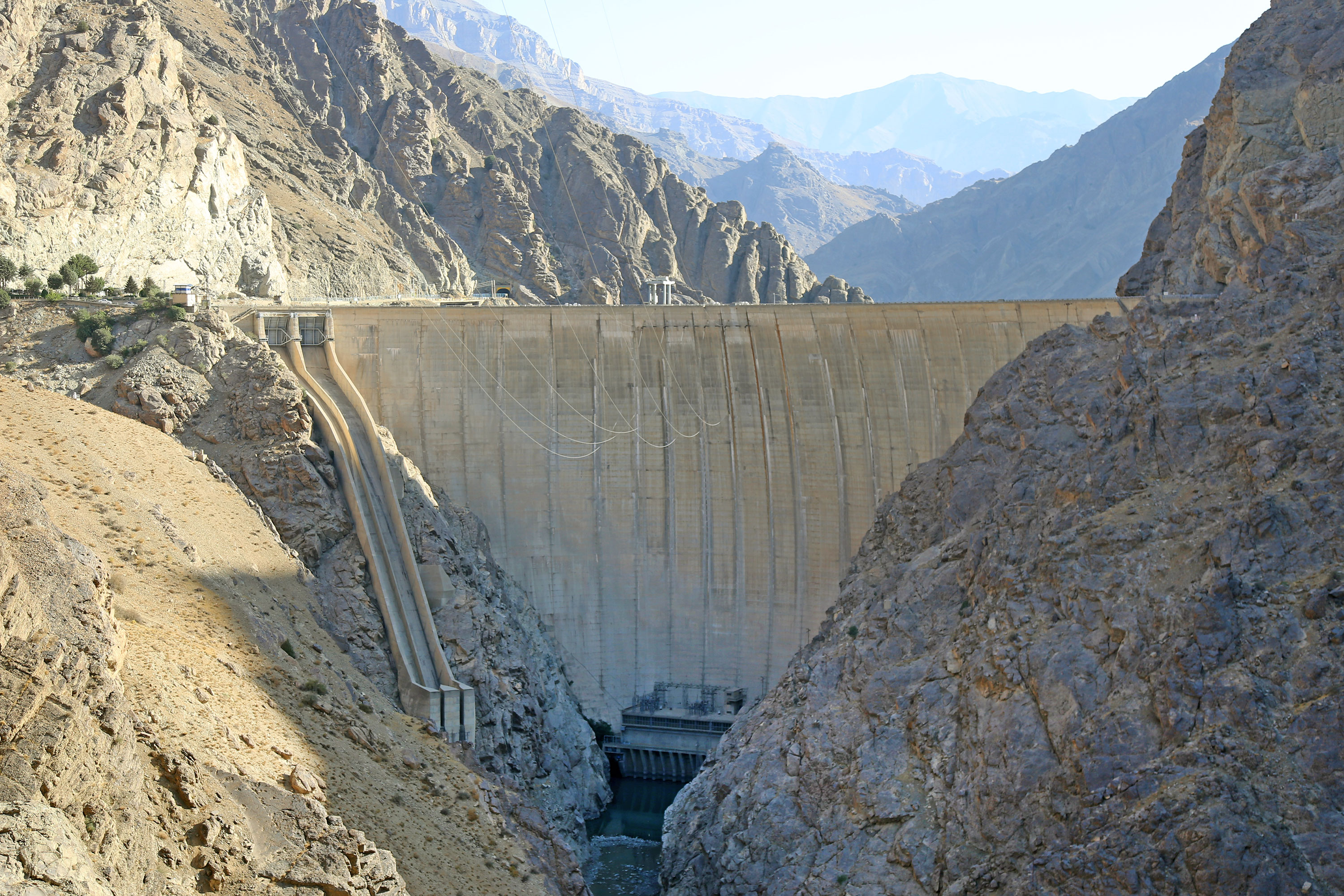
Karaj Dam, Alborz Province, Iran

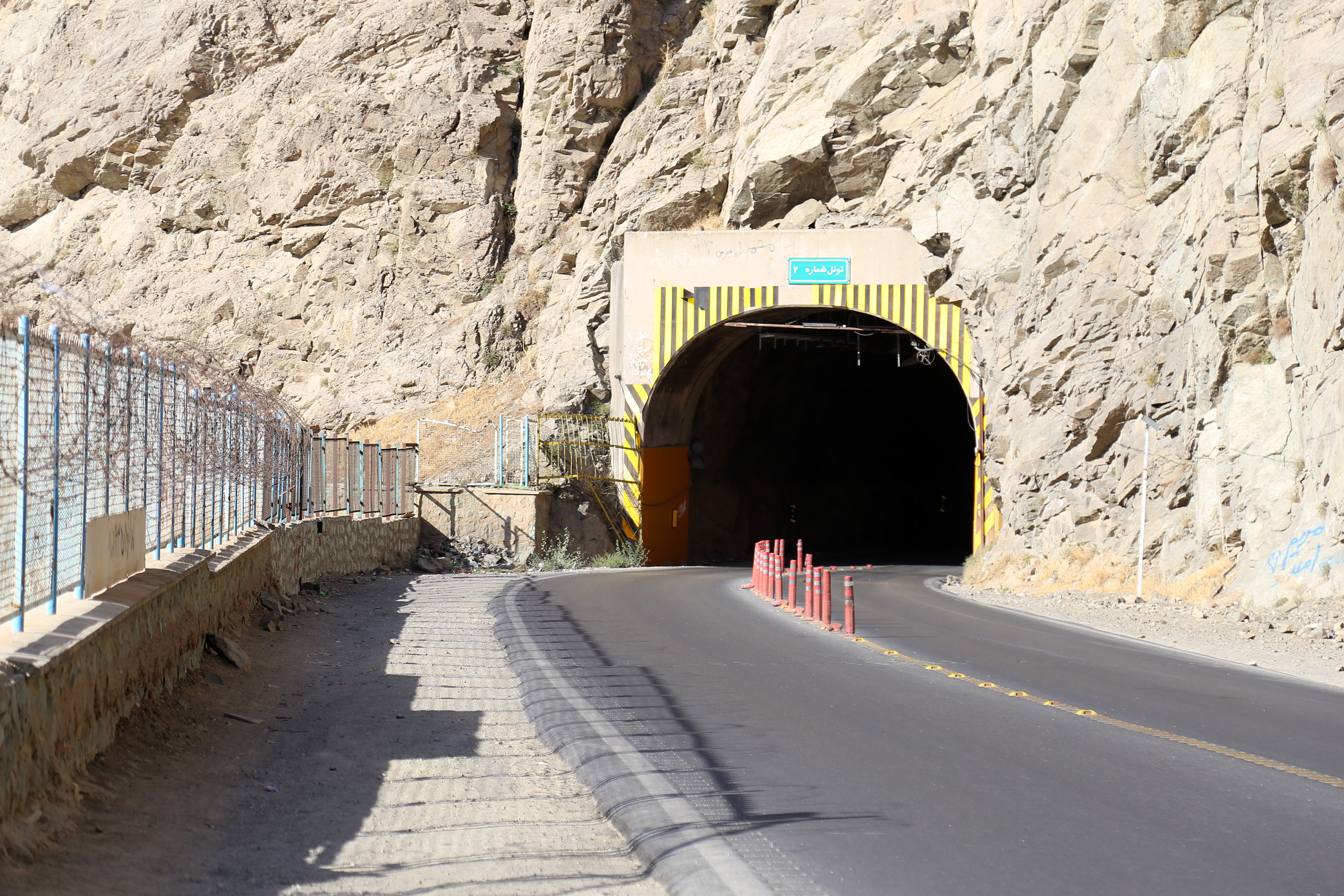
Karaj Dam, Alborz Province, Iran

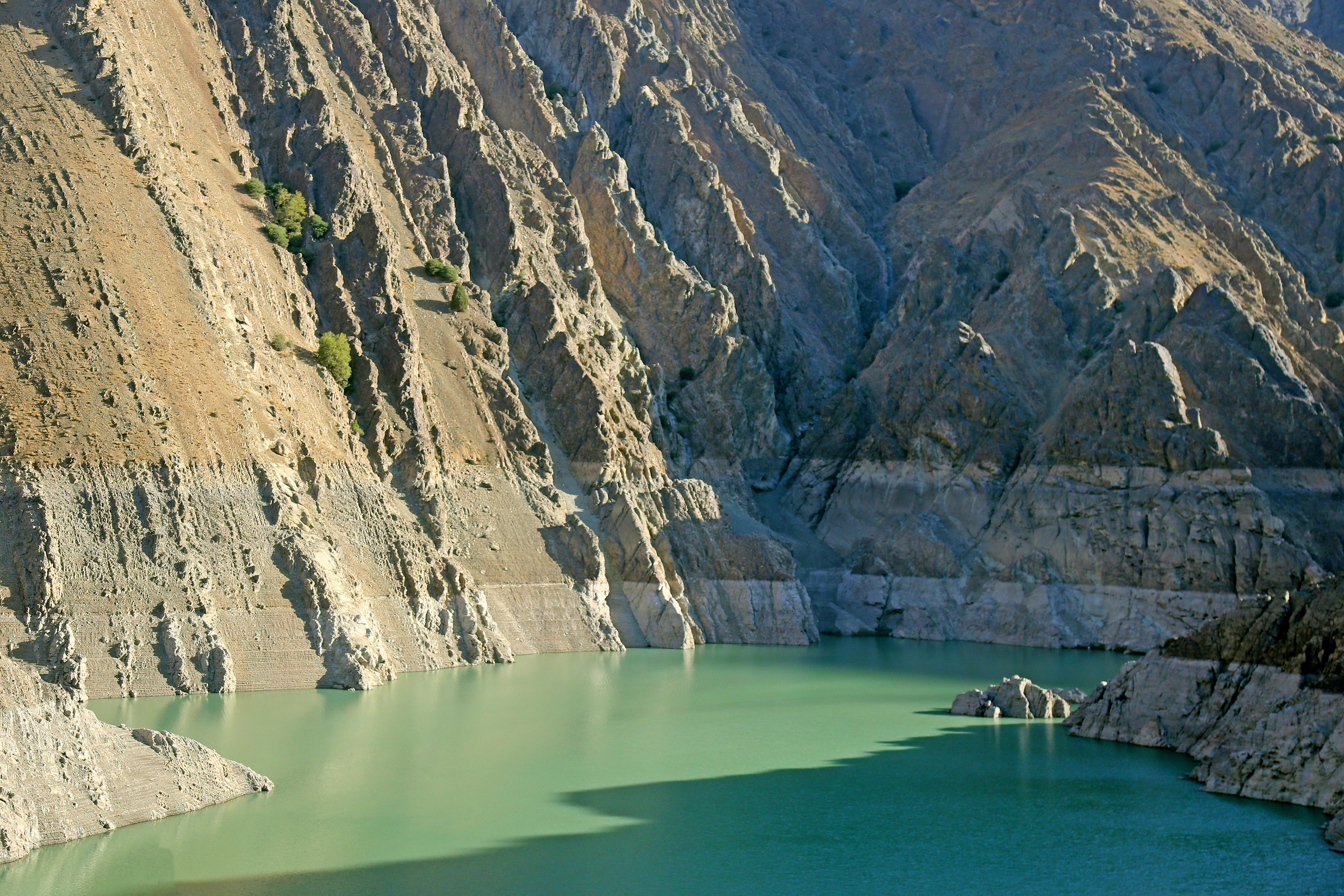
Karaj Dam, Alborz Province, Iran

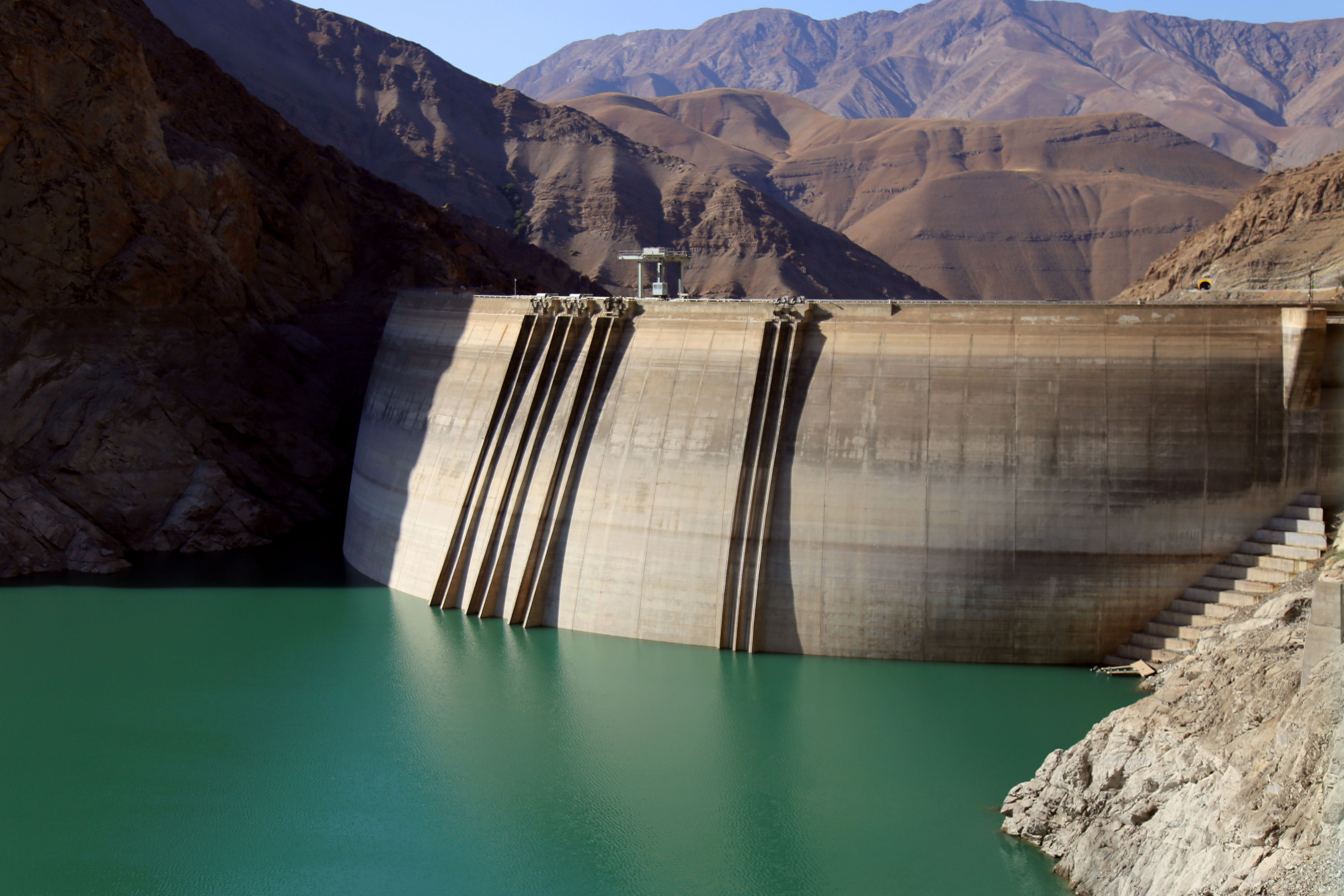
Karaj Dam, Alborz Province, Iran

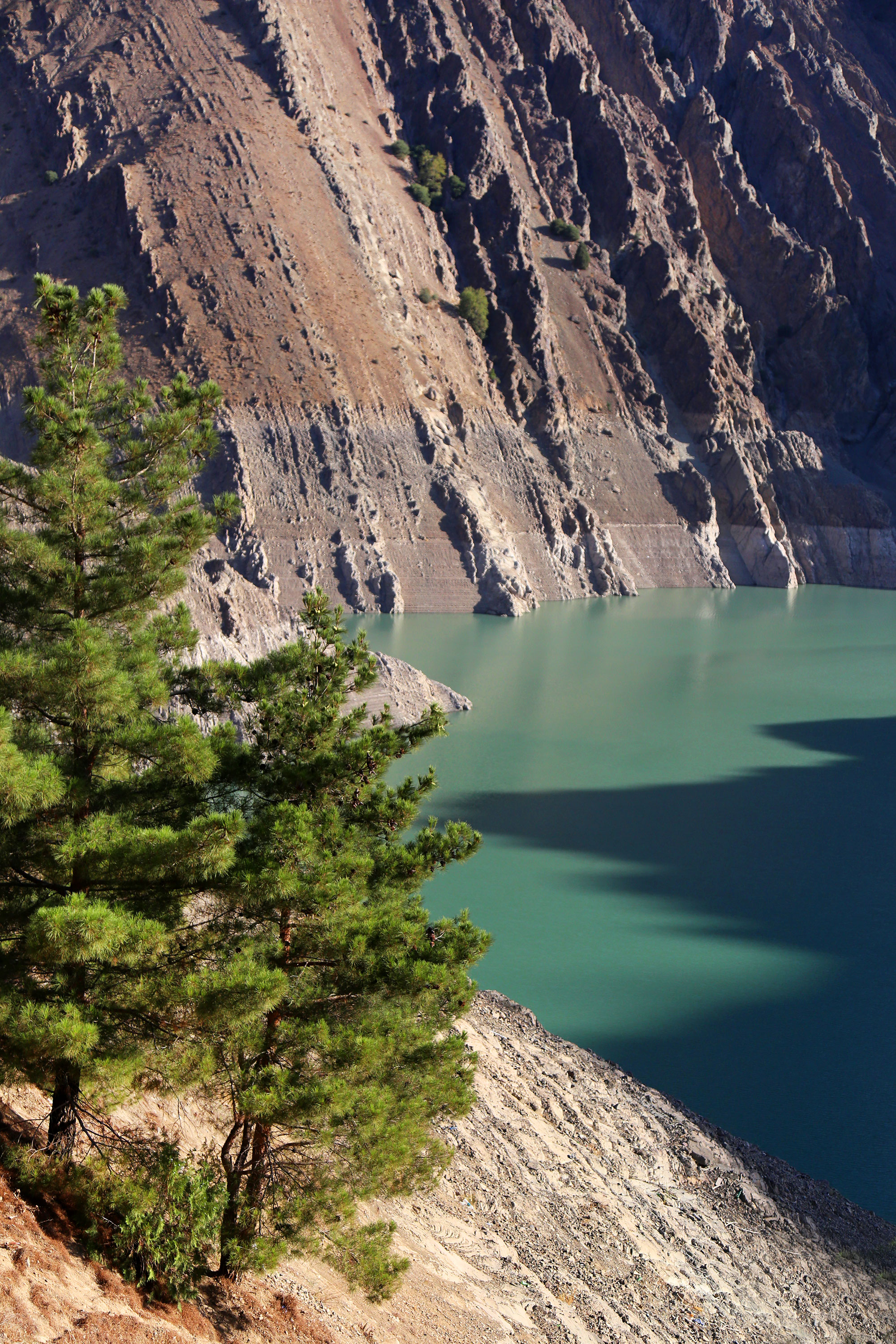
Karaj Dam, Alborz Province, Iran

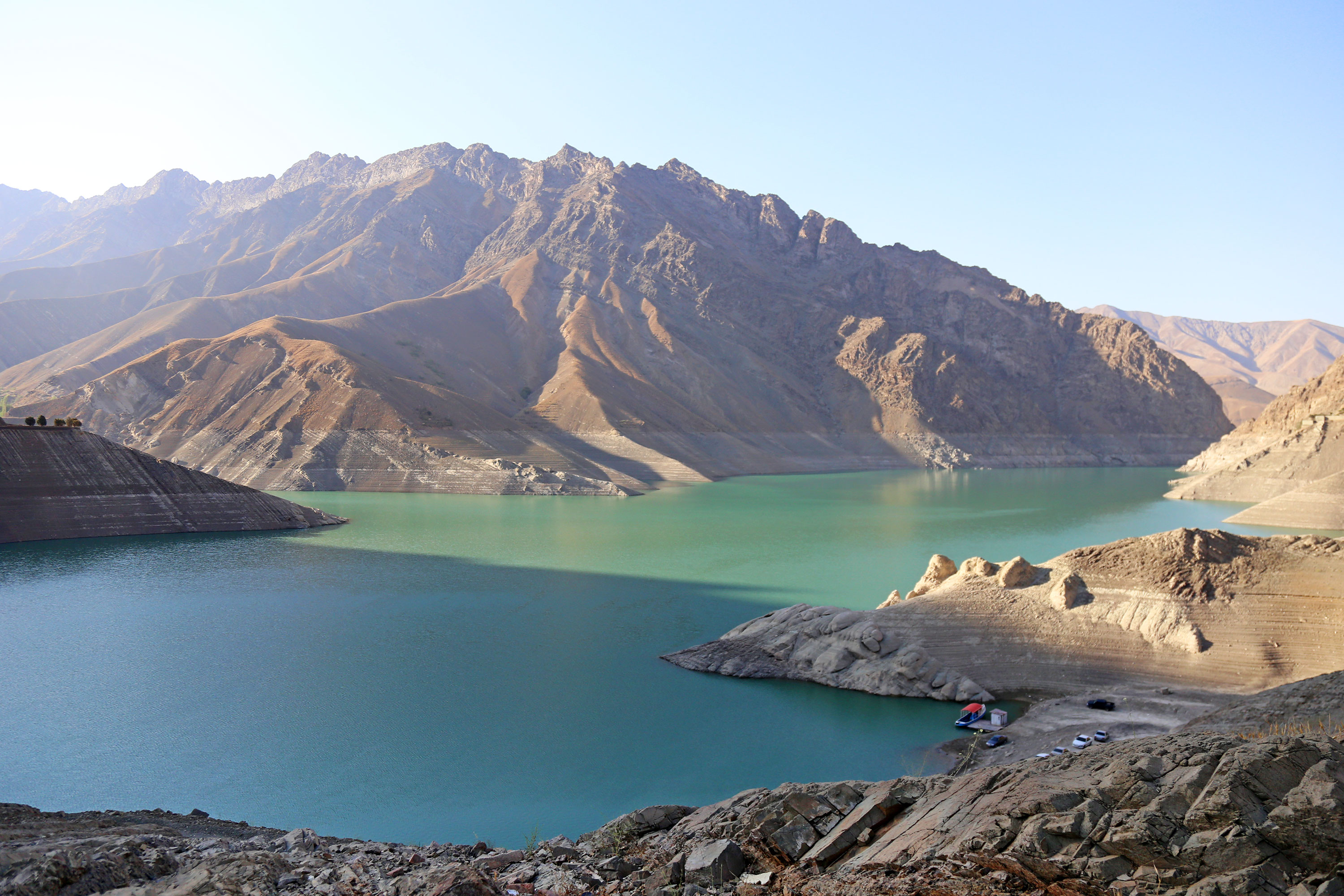
Karaj Dam, Alborz Province, Iran

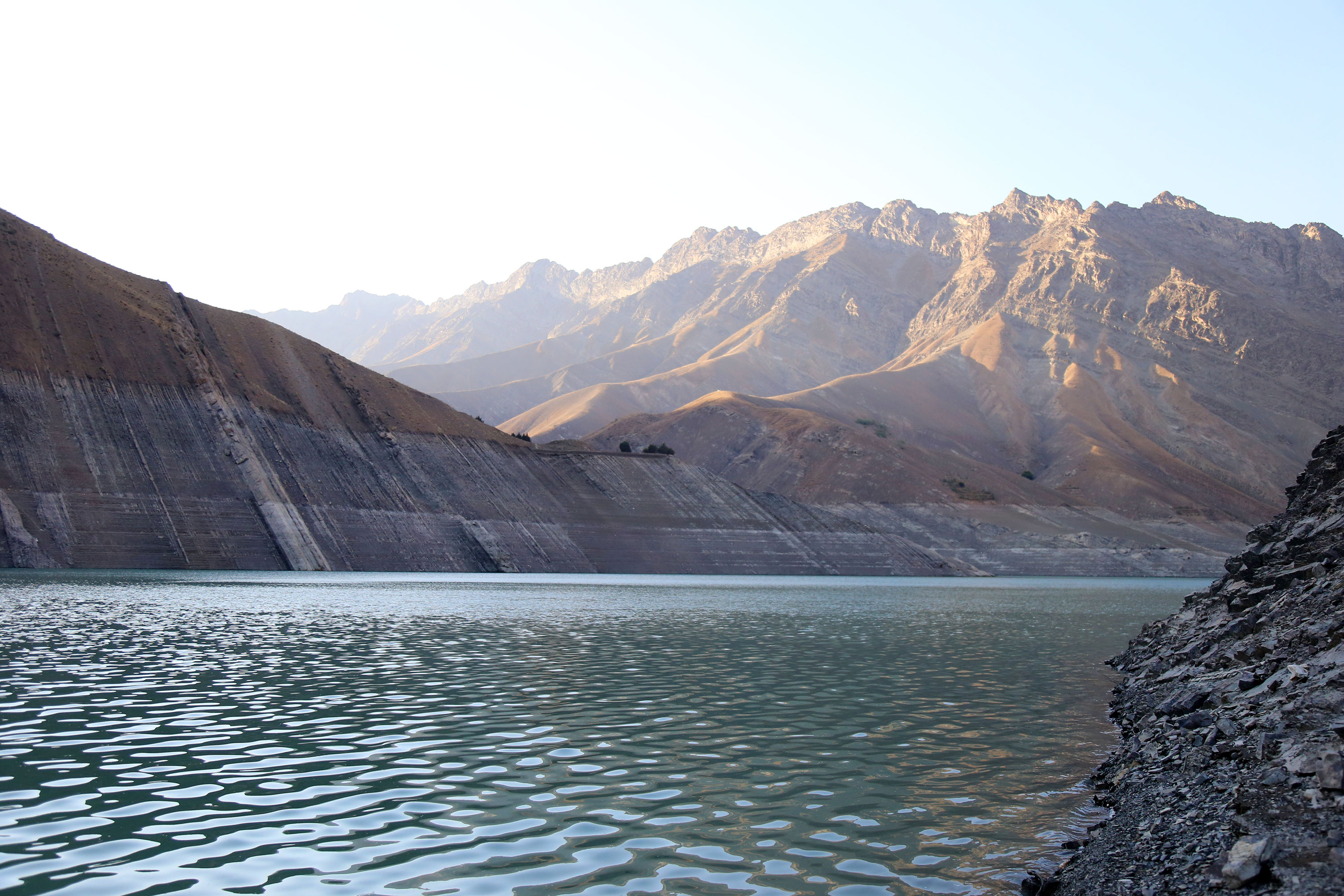
Karaj Dam, Alborz Province, Iran

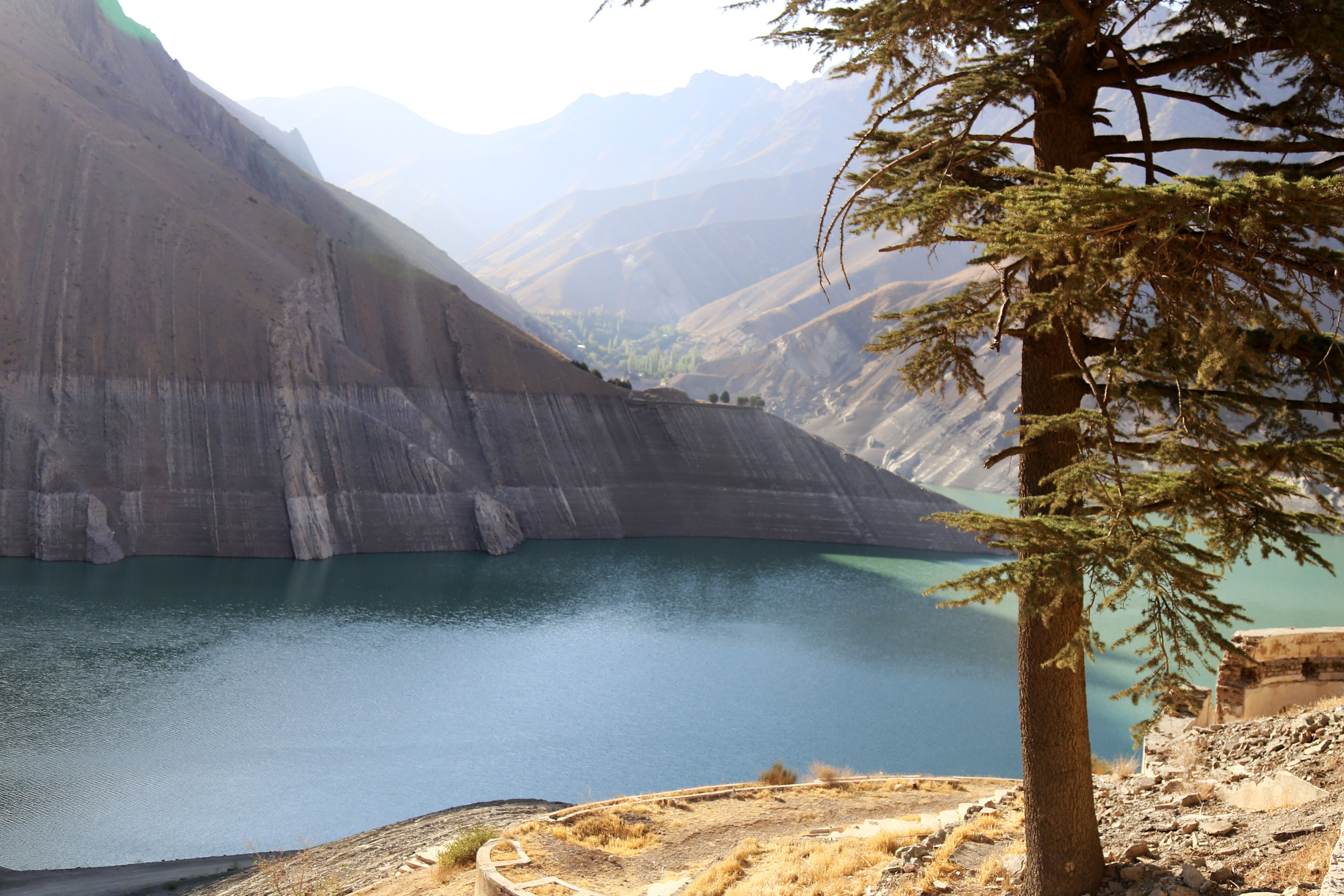
Karaj Dam, Alborz Province, Iran

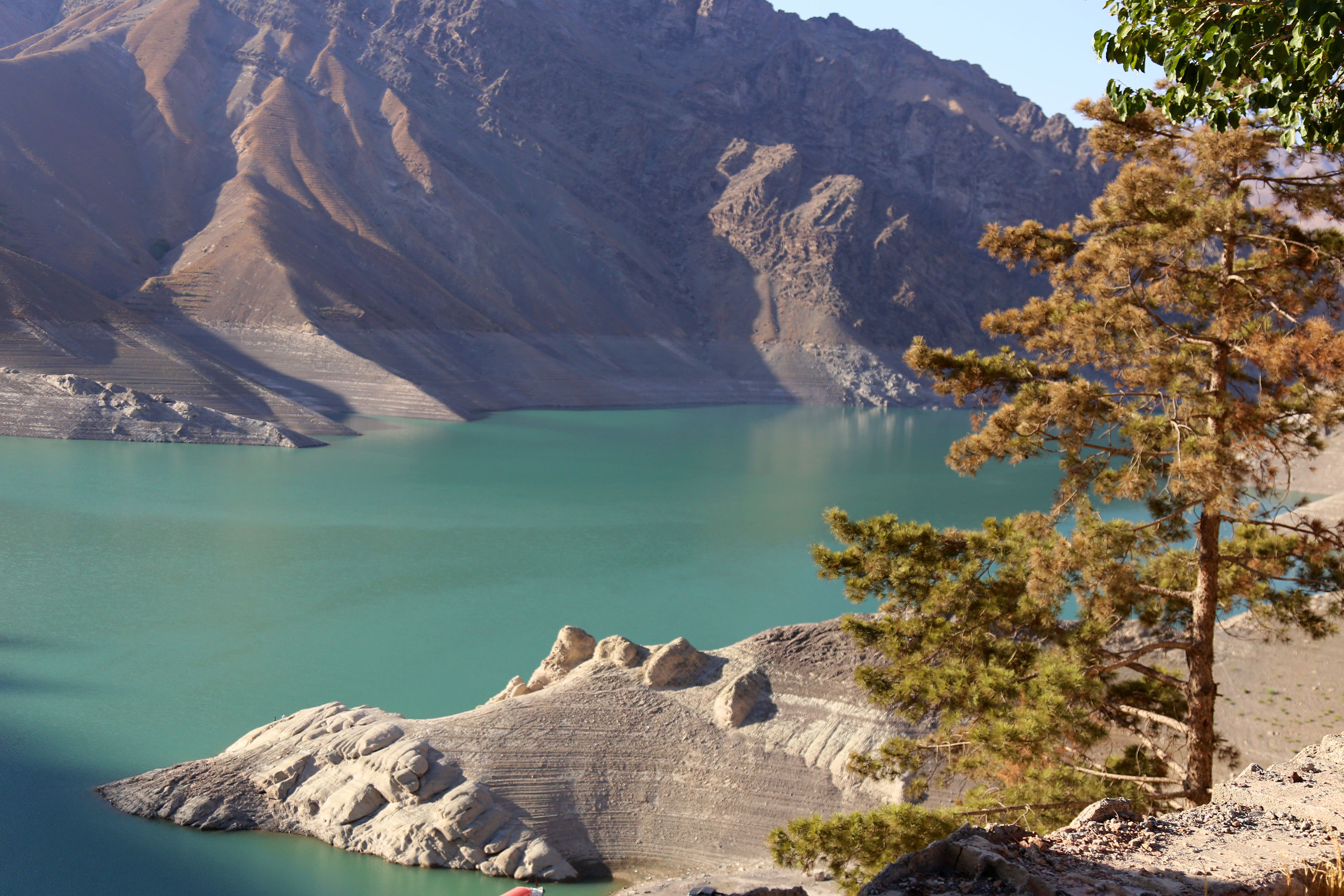
Karaj Dam, Alborz Province, Iran

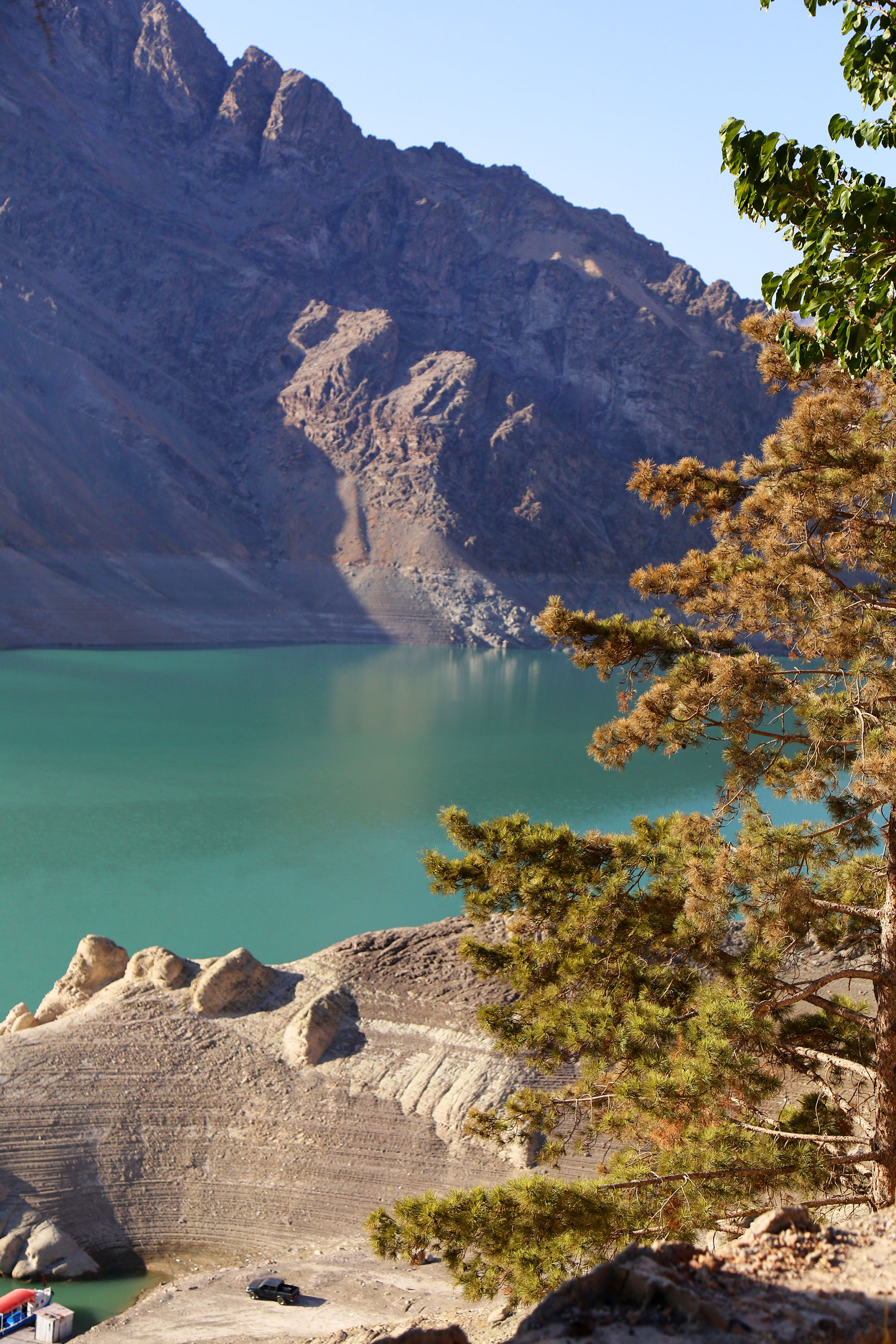
Karaj Dam, Alborz Province, Iran

== See also ==
- Alborz mountain range topics
- Albert Lamorisse
- Dams in Iran
- Chalus Road
