= Asara =

City in Alborz province, Iran

Asara Persian: آسارا
- City
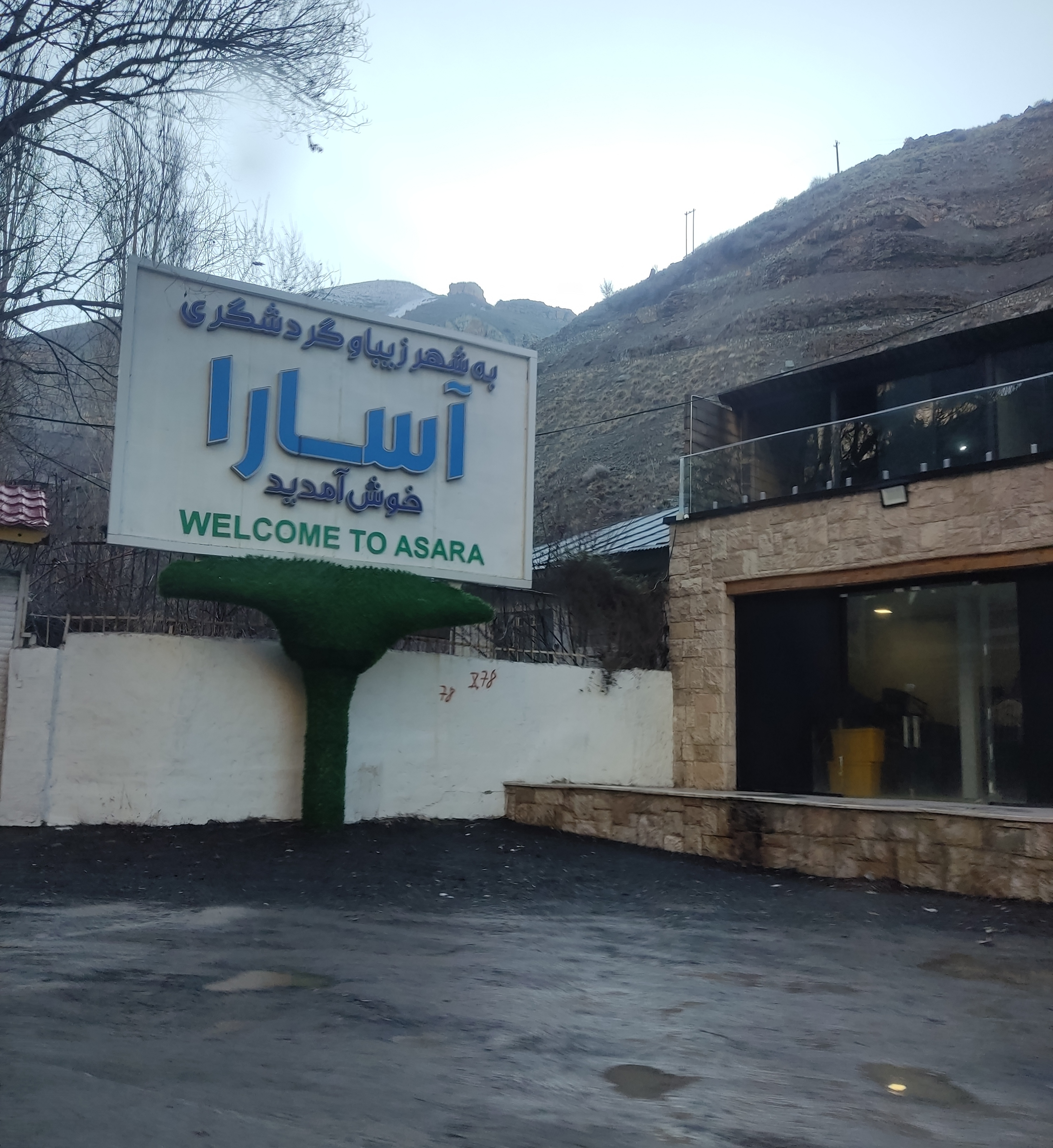

- Location within Iran
- Coordinates: 36°02′12″N 51°11′40″E
- Country: Iran
- Province: Alborz
- County: Karaj
- District: Asara
- Established as a city: 2008

Population (2016)
  - Total: 1,339
- Time zone: UTC+3:30 (IRST)

Asara (Persian: آسارا) (Note: Also romanized as Āsārā) is a city in, and the capital of, Asara District in Karaj County, Alborz province, Iran. It also serves as the administrative center for Asara Rural District. The city is in the Alborz (Elburz) mountain range.

== Demographics ==
=== Population ===
At the time of the 2006 National Census, Asara's population was 430 in 125 households, when it was a village in Asara Rural District. In 2008, Asara merged with the villages of Pol-e Khvab, Rey Zamin, and Sira in forming the new city. The 2016 census measured the population of the city as 1,339 people in 452 households, by which time the county had been separated from the province in the establishment of Alborz province.
