= Adaran Rural District =

Rural district in Alborz province, Iran

Adaran Rural District Persian: دهستان آدران
- Rural district
- Location within Iran
- Coordinates: 36°00′N 51°06′E
- Country: Iran
- Province: Alborz
- County: Karaj
- District: Asara
- Capital: Adaran

Population (2016)
  - Total: 7,679
- Time zone: UTC+3:30 (IRST)

Adaran Rural District (Persian: دهستان آدران) is in Asara District of Karaj County, Alborz province, Iran. Its capital is the village of Adaran.

== Demographics ==
=== Population ===
At the time of the 2006 National Census, the rural district's population (as a part of Tehran province) was 8,995 in 2,681 households. The 2016 census measured the population of the rural district as 7,679 people in 2,743 households, by which time the county had been separated from the province in the establishment of Alborz province. The most populous of its 31 villages was Kondor, with 1,922 people.

=== Other villages in the rural district ===
- Abharak
- Arangeh
- Avizar
- Ayegan
- Charan
- Gurab
- Hareyn
- Jey
- Kalha
- Kalvan
- Khur
- Khuzankola
- Kushk-e Bala
- Leylestan
- Nasht-e Rud
- Nowjan
- Purkan
- Sar Ziarat
- Sarv Dar
- Sijan
- Tasisat Sadamirkebir
- Varian
- Varzan
- Vineh
