= Karaj County =

County in Alborz province, Iran

Karaj County Persian: شهرستان کرج
- County
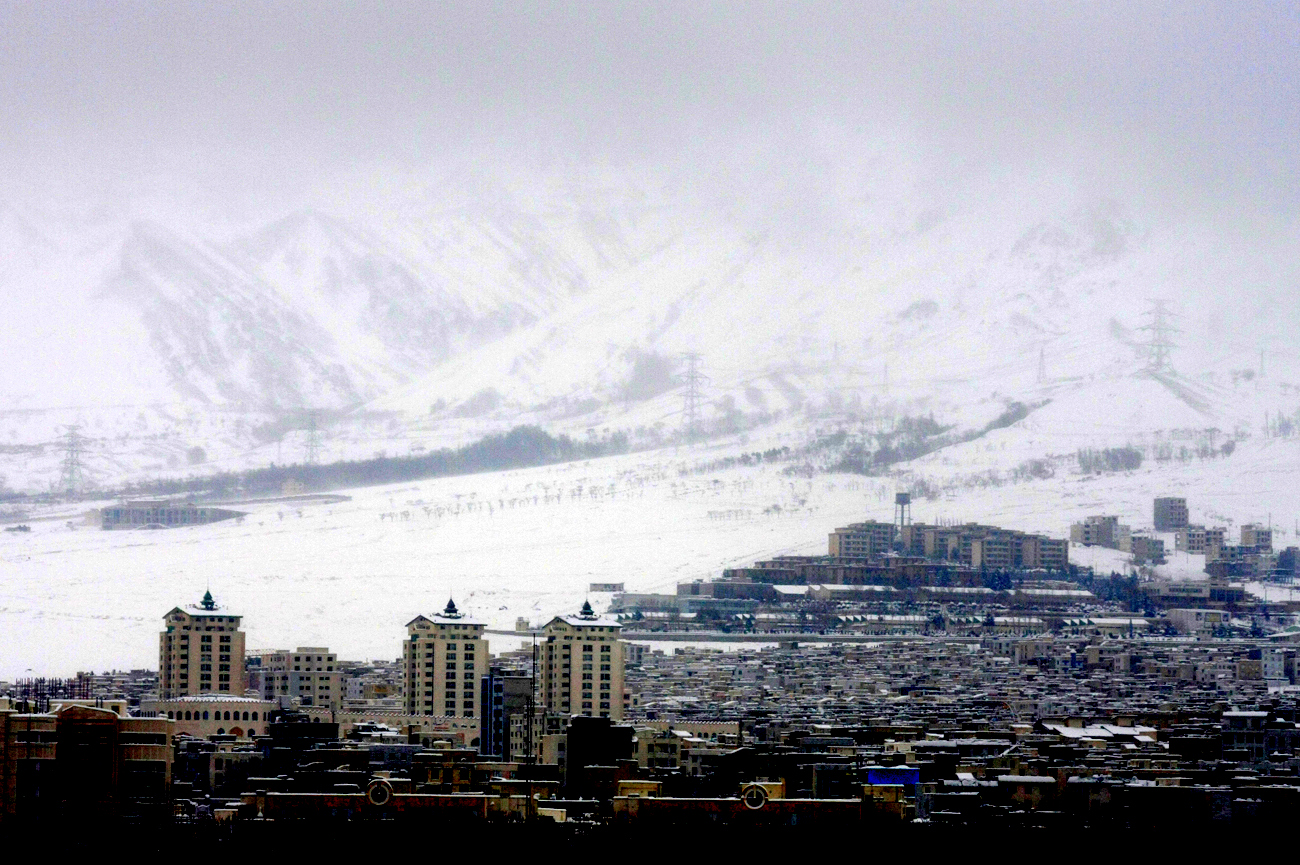
- Karaj in winter

- Location of Karaj County in Alborz province (right, green)

- Location of Alborz province in Iran
- Coordinates: 35°58′N 51°05′E
- Country: Iran
- Province: Alborz
- Capital: Karaj
- Districts: Central, Asara

Area
  - Total: 1,419 km^{2} (548 sq mi)

Population (2016)
  - Total: 1,973,470
  - Density: 1,391/km^{2} (3,602/sq mi)
- Time zone: UTC+3:30 (IRST)

Karaj County (Persian: شهرستان کرج) is in Alborz province, Iran. Its capital is the city of Karaj.

== History ==
In 2009, three villages merged in forming the city of Asara. In 2010, the county separated from Tehran province in the establishment of Alborz province.

In 2012, Eshtehard District was separated from the county in establishing Eshtehard County. In 2013, the city of Meshkin Dasht, the Fardis neighborhood (Note: Became the city of Fardis) in the city of Karaj, and other parts of the county were separated from it to establish Fardis County.

== Demographics ==
=== Population ===
At the time of the 2006 National Census, the county's population was 1,709,481 in 472,365 households. The 2016 census measured the population of the county as 1,973,470 in 623,801 households.

=== Administrative divisions ===
Karaj County's population history and administrative structure over two censuses are shown in the following table.

Karaj County Population (Note: As a part of Tehran province at the 2006 census)
Administrative Divisions	2006	2016
Central District	1,667,024	1,956,267
Garmdarreh RD	544	221
Kamalabad RD	3,836	4,892
Mohammadabad RD	22,099	11,939
Garmdarreh (city)	12,738	22,726
Kamal Shahr (city)	80,435	141,669
Karaj (city)	1,377,450	1,592,492
Mahdasht (city)	43,100	62,910
Meshkin Dasht (city) (Note: Transferred to Fardis County)	43,696	
Mohammadshahr (city)	83,126	119,418
Asara District	18,856	17,150
Adaran RD	8,995	7,679
Asara RD	3,780	3,063
Nesa RD	6,081	5,069
Asara (city)		1,339
Eshtehard District (Note: Transferred to Eshtehard County)	23,601	
Palangabad RD	6,613	
Eshtehard (city)	16,988	
Total	1,709,481	1,973,470
RD = Rural District

== Gallery ==
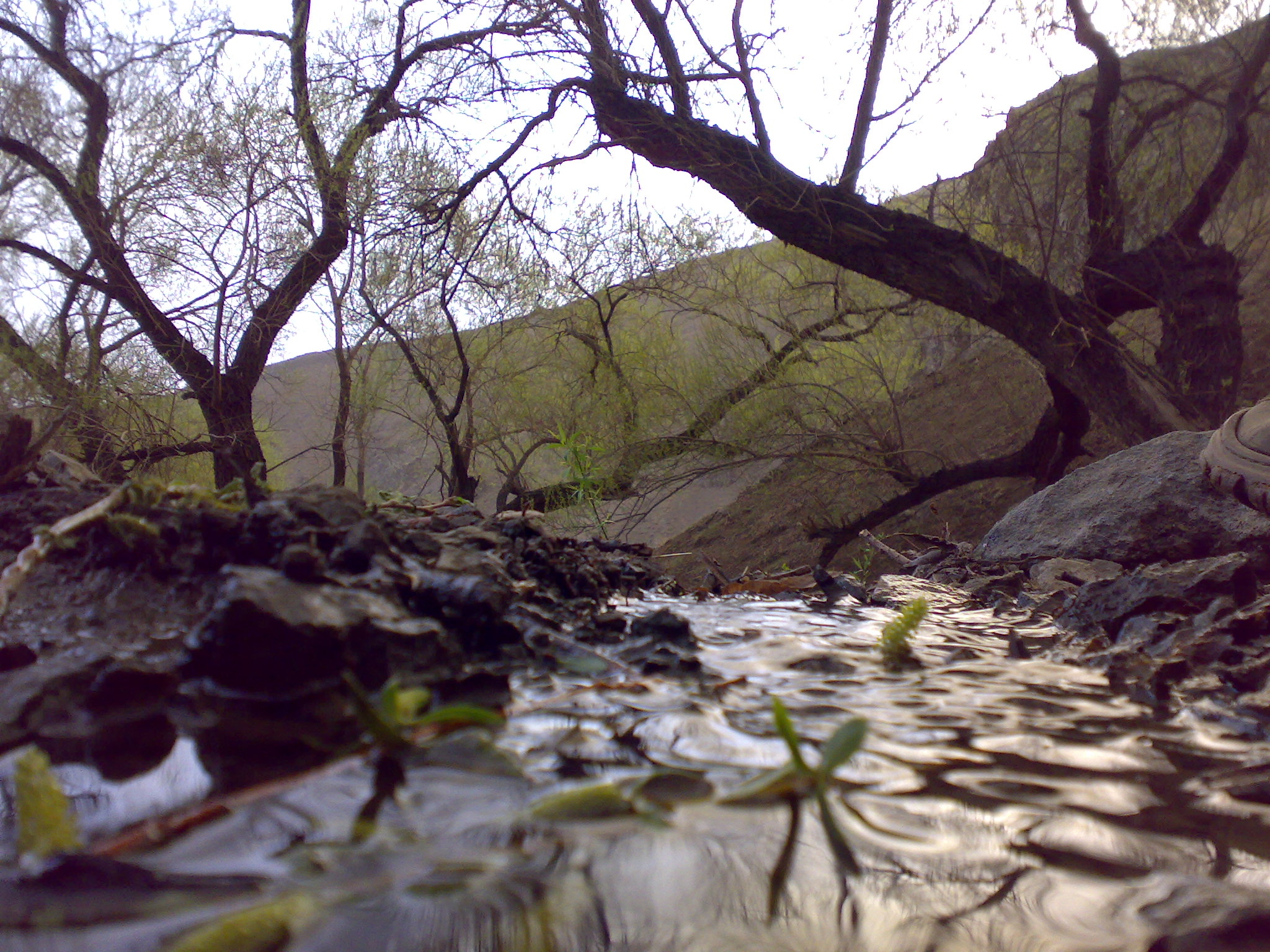
Karaj Valley

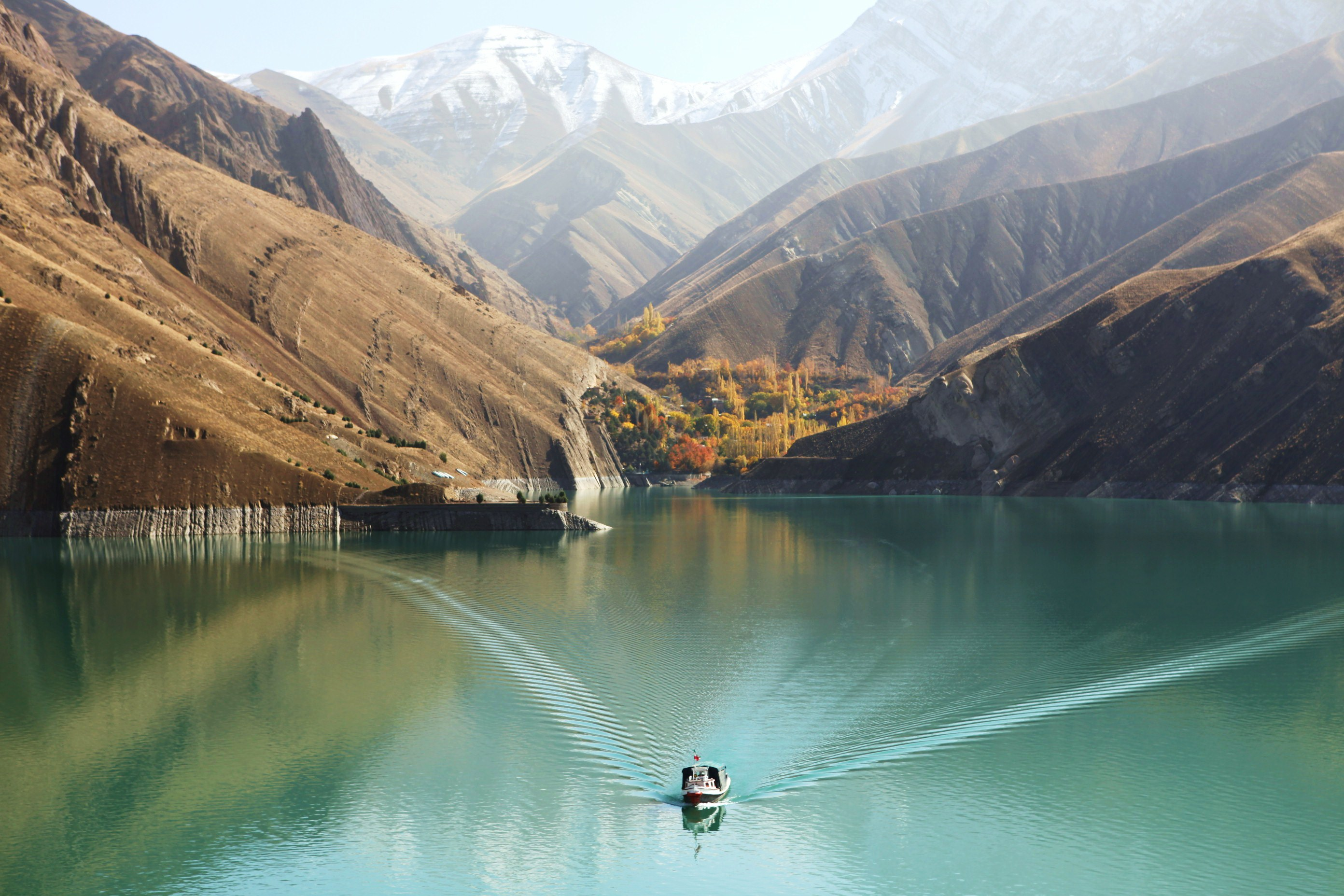
Karaj Dam

== See also ==
Media related to Karaj County at Wikimedia Commons
