= Asara District =

District in Alborz province, Iran

Asara District Persian: بخش آسارا
- District
- Location within Iran
- Coordinates: 36°01′N 51°17′E
- Country: Iran
- Province: Alborz
- County: Karaj
- Established: 2001
- Capital: Asara

Population (2016)
  - Total: 17,150
- Time zone: UTC+3:30 (IRST)

Asara District (Persian: بخش آسارا) is in Karaj County, Alborz province, Iran. Its capital is the city of Asara.

== History ==
In 2008, three villages merged in the formation of the city of Asara. In 2010, the county was separated from Tehran province in the establishment of Alborz province.

== Demographics ==
=== Population ===
At the time of the 2006 National Census, the district's population was 18,856 in 5,407 households. The 2016 census measured the population of the district as 17,150 people in 5,977 households.

=== Administrative divisions ===
Asara District Population (Note: As a part of Tehran province at the 2006 census)
Administrative Divisions	2006	2016
Adaran RD	8,995	7,679
Asara RD	3,780	3,063
Nesa RD	6,081	5,069
Asara (city)		1,339
Total	18,856	17,150
RD = Rural District
