= Tati language (Iran) =

Northwestern Iranian language

Tati
- Tâti تاتی زبون
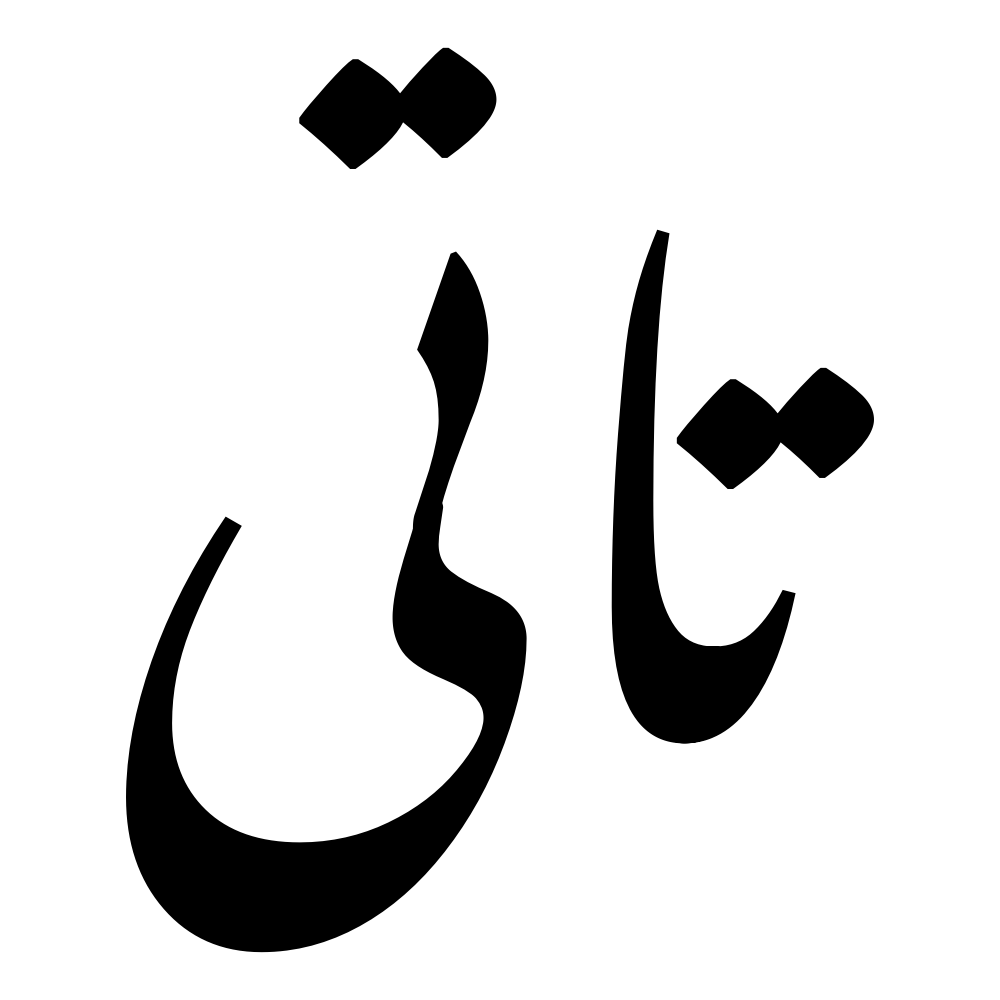
- Tati written in Nastaliq script (تاتی)
- Native to: Iran
- Ethnicity: Tats
- Native speakers: 410,000 Takestani speakers (2021); 36,000 Harzandi speakers (2021)
- Language family: Indo-European: Indo-Iranian; Iranian; Western; Northwestern; Adharic; Tatic; Tati
- Writing system: Persian alphabet

Language codes
- ISO 639-3: Variously: tks – Takestani xkc – Kho'ini hrz – Harzani esh – Eshtehardi tov – Upper Taromi xkp – Kabatei goz – Gozarkhani xkj – Kajali okh – Koresh-e Rostam shm – Shahrudi vmh – Maraghei kgn – Karingani avd – Alviri-Vidari rat – Razajerdi atn – Ashtiani vaf – Vafsi
- Glottolog: tati1244 Tatic (except Talysh)
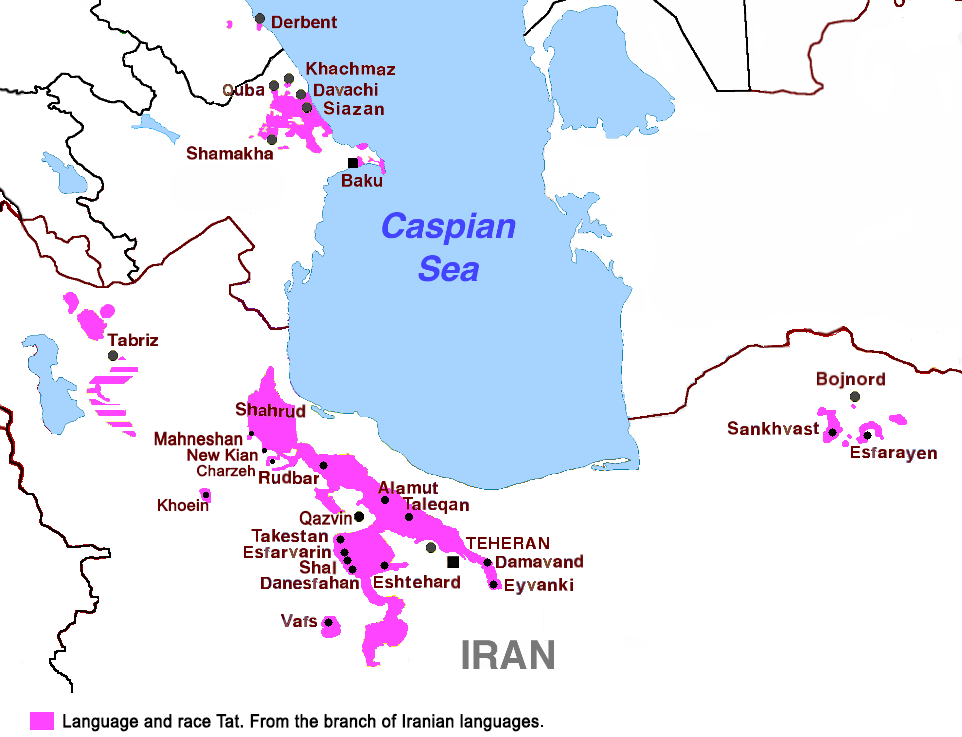
- Areas with Tati-speakers as mother tongue

- Tati is classified as Definitely Endangered by the UNESCO; Atlas of the World's Languages in Danger

The Tati language (Tati: تاتی زبون, Tâti Zobun) is a Northwestern Iranian language spoken by the Tat people of Iran which is closely related to languages such as Talysh, Zaza, Mazandarani and Gilaki. Tati consists of many sub-dialects and its dialects are spoken in sparsely distributed small pockets in northern and northwestern Iran. Tati shares common isoglosses and many characteristic words with Talysh and Zaza that are not found in other Iranian languages. Tati, similar to Zaza, has a two-gender, case and ergative system. The language is also referred to as Southern Tati and is considered the present-day Azari, reflecting its affinity with Old Azeri.

The Tati dialects are usually divided into three main clusters consisting of the northern, central and southern clusters. The northern cluster is spoken in the area near the Azerbaijan and Turkey border, the central cluster is spoken in northwestern Iran and the southern cluster is spoken in farther south provinces such as Zanjan, Qazvin and Markazi. The Kilit dialect of the language was spoken outside of present-day Iran, in Azerbaijan.

== Old Azeri ==
Some sources use the term Old Azeri to refer to the Tati language as it was spoken in the region before the spread of Turkic languages, and is now only spoken by different rural communities in Iranian Azerbaijan (such as villages in Harzanabad area, villages around Khalkhal and Ardabil), and also in Zanjan and Qazvin provinces. Alongside with Tati dialects, Old Azeri is known to have strong affinities with Talysh and Zaza language. Tati, Zaza and Talysh are considered to be descendants of old Azeri. Harzandi dialect that thought to be descendant of the Old Azeri language was positioned between the Talysh and Zaza.

== Tati language structure ==
In any language, roots and verb affixes constitute the most basic and important components of a language. The root is an element included in all the words of a lexical family and carries the basic meaning of those lexical items. A verb affix is an element added to the root to form a new meaning. In many new Iranian languages, verb affixes have been left almost unnoticed, and it will be possible, by the act of deriving roots, to clear up most of their structural and semantic ambiguities. Unlike the root, verb affixes can be easily identified and described. In many languages, verb affixes act as the base of verb formation and are often derived from a limited number of roots. Tati, Talysh, Mazandarani and Gilaki languages belong to North-western Iranian languages currently spoken along the coast of Caspian Sea. These languages which enjoy many old linguistic elements have not been duly studied from a linguistic perspective.

In the field of phonetics Tati is similar to the rest of the north-western Iranian languages: it is distinguished by the persistence of Iranian *z, *s, *y-, * v- against the south-western d, h, j-, b-; development /ʒ/ < * j, */t͡ʃ/ against the south-west z, and the preservation of intervocalic and postvocalic *r and even, for a number of dialects, development rhotacism.

=== Gender in Tati language ===
In the field of morphology, Tati is less analytical in structure than the south-western Iranian languages. Having lost the ancient foundations of classes and verb, tati preserved case (two case: direct, or subjective, and oblique). It has a grammatical gender feature in many dialects and exhibits two genders (masculine and feminine) similar to the Zaza language.

As a rare linguistic feature among all Northwestern Iranian languages, Tati dialects, along with Zaza, Semnani and Sangsari languages gender agreement occur on verbs. Third-person pronoun take different inflections for masculine and feminine subjects in Zaza, Semnani and Sangsari. As a quite unique linguistic feature among Northwestern Iranian languages, in some Tati dialects and Zaza, the second-person pronoun takes different inflections for masculine and feminine subjects.

=== Ergative in Tati language ===
Tati is, similar to the Zaza language of the same linguistic branch, an ergative language, i.e. "with transitive verbs the subject/agent of the verb is expressed by the direct case in the present tenses, but by the oblique in the past tenses, whereas the direct object/patient in the present tenses is expressed by the oblique, but by the direct in the past".
Khalkhali is one of the Tati dialects spoken in Shahrood and Xorsh-rostam districts of Khalkhal. Khalkhali Tati is distinguished from other dialects producing ergative structures, because of the adherence of verb to semantic object, in number, person and specially in gender. Meanwhile, according to some evidence in this dialect, apart from past transitive verbs, some intransitive verbs are influenced by the ergative structure.

== Phonology ==
=== Consonants ===
The phonology is based on the Southern Tati dialects:

		Labial	Dental/ Alveolar	Palatal	Velar	Uvular	Glottal
Nasal		m	n				
Plosive/ Affricate	voiceless	p	t	t͡ʃ	k	q	(ʔ) (Note: A glottal stop /ʔ/ may only appear after some elongated vowel sounds, and is likely adopted from Persian loanwords.)
Plosive/ Affricate	voiced	b	d	d͡ʒ	ɡ		
Fricative	voiceless	f	s	ʃ		χ, (χʷ) (Note: A labialized sound /χʷ/ occurs only before the vowel sound /ɑ/.)	h
Fricative	voiced	v	z	(ʒ) (Note: The sound /ʒ/ only occurs before a voiced plosive /d/, and is most likely an allophone of /d͡ʒ/.)	(ɣ) (Note: In the Takestani dialect, /ɡ/ may have the allophone [ɣ].)		
Approximant			l	j	(w) (Note: The sound [w] does not occur as a phoneme, but it does occur when /u/ is preceding another vowel.)		
Trill			r				

The following sounds /r, v, q/ may allophonically range to the sounds [ɾ, β, ʁ].

=== Vowels ===
	Front		Central	Back
Close	i			u
Mid	e	ø	(ə)	ɔ~o
Mid	ɛ		(ə)	ɔ~o
Open	æ			ɑ

The vowel sound for /e/ is recognized as two sounds [ɛ, e], and allophonically as [ə].

In the Chali dialect, the /o/ phoneme is only realized as a diphthong [ɔu], whereas in Takestani, it is only recognized as ranging from [ɔ~o].

== Dialects ==
Tati has four main dialects:

1. South of Qazvin province (Tākestāni, Eshtehārdi, Chāli, Dānesfāni, Esfarvarini, Ebrāhim-ābādi, Sagz-ābādi)
2. Ardabil province (Khalkhāli)
3. Alborz mountains range (Damāvandi). This dialect was, probably, used to be spoken around the northern part of Tehran City.
4. North Khorasan province (Khorāsāni)

Other Tati dialects are Vafsi, Lohudji, Parsi, Dagli (Khizi) Harzandi, Kho'ini, and Kiliti Eshtehardi.

=== Harzandi Tati ===
The Harzandi dialect is spoken in the area near the Azerbaijan and Turkey border. Its speakers principally reside in the rural district of Harzand, particularly in the village known as Galin Qayah/Kohriz. Harzani is also spoken in the neighboring villages of Babratein and Dash Harzand. Thus, it is one of the northwesternmost Tati dialects. The Harzandi dialect shares significant linguistic affinity (genetic relationship and structural similarity) and many characteristic words with Zaza and thus it is considered a transitional dialect between Tati and Zaza. Harzandi, in addition to its linguistic proximity to Zaza, is also spoken in an area geographically closer to where Zaza is spoken, compared to other Tati dialects.

The dialect is considered an endangered language with a little less than 30,000 speakers in present day and as of now, Harzandi has not been formally recognized by the Islamic Republic of Iran, and thus receives no government support.

Similar to other languages and dialects of the Iranian language family, Harzani follows a subject–object–verb (SOV) word order. It has nine vowels, and shares a consonant inventory with Persian. It further exhibits a split-ergative case system: its present tense is structured to follow nominative-accusative patterning, while its past tense follows ergative-absolutive. One characteristic that distinguishes Harzani from related Northwestern Iranian languages is its change from an intervocalic /d/ to an /r/. It also has a tendency to lengthen its vowels. For instance, it has the closed vowel /oe/.

Nouns and pronouns in Harzani do not reflect grammatical gender, but they do express case. Nouns, in particular, encode two cases: direct and oblique case, the first of which is not rendered morphologically, but the second is by attaching a suffix. Meanwhile, personal pronouns have three cases: direct, oblique, and possessive. Verbs in Harzani are inflected for present tense and past tense. Information concerning person and number is reflected in suffixes that attach to these two verb stems. Modal and aspectual information is expressed using prefixes.

=== Hazarrudi Tati ===
The Hazarrudi dialect is spoken in the Hazarrud village and surrounding area in Tarom County of Zanjan province. It distinguishes two numbers (singular and plural), two cases, direct and oblique, and two grammatical genders, masculine and feminine, in nouns as well as in the third person singular of pronouns and verbs. Nouns are unmarked for the masculine singular and marked for an unstressed -a for the femnine singular and marked with the unstressed -e for the direct plural and -ân for oblique plural. There are various ways to form passive and causative voices in Hazarrudi. The passive stem is formed by adding -i, -est and -ax to the verb stem and the causative is formed by adding -amen and -en to the stem.

=== Vafsi Tati ===
Vafsi is a dialect of Tati language spoken in the Vafs village and surrounding area in the Markazi province of Iran. The dialects of the Tafresh region share many features with the Central Plateau dialects; however, their lexical inventory has many items in common with the Talysh subgroup.

Vafsi has six short vowel phonemes, five long vowel phonemes and two nasal vowel phonemes. The consonant inventory is basically the same as in Persian. Nouns are inflected for gender (masculine, feminine), number (singular, plural) and case (direct, oblique).

The oblique case marks the possessor (preceding the head noun), the definite direct object, nouns governed by a preposition, and the subject of transitive verbs in the past tense. Personal pronouns are inflected for number (singular, plural) and case (direct, oblique). tA set of enclitic pronouns is used to indicate the agent of transitive verbs in the past tenses.

There are two demonstrative pronouns: one for near deixis, one for remote deixis. The use of the Persian ezafe construction is spreading; however, there is also a native possessive construction, consisting of the possessor (unmarked or marked by the oblique case) preceding the head noun.

The verbal inflection is based on two stems: present and past stem. Person and number are indicated personal suffixes attached to the stem. In the transitive past tense the verb consists of the bare past stem and personal concord with the subject is provided by enclitic pronouns following the stem or a constituent preceding the verb. Two modal prefixes are used to convey modal and aspectual information. The past participle is employed in the formation of compound tenses.

Vafsi is a split ergative language: Split ergativity means that a language has in one domain accusative morphosyntax and in another domain ergative morphosyntax. In Vafsi the present tense is structured the accusative way and the past tense is structured the ergative way. Accusative morphosyntax means that in a language subjects of intransitive and transitive verbs are treated the same way and direct objects are treated another way. Ergative morphosyntax means that in a language subjects of intransitive verbs and direct objects are treated one way and subjects of transitive verbs are treated another way.

In the Vafsi past tense subjects of intransitive verbs and direct objects are marked by the direct case whereas subjects of transitive verbs are marked by the oblique case. This feature characterizes the Vafsi past tense as ergative.

The unmarked order of constituents is SOV similar to most other Iranian languages.

=== Kho'ini Tati ===
It is spoken in the village of Xoin and surrounding areas, about 60 kilometres (37 mi) southwest of Zanjan city in northern Iran. The Xoini verbal system follows the general pattern found in other Tati dialects. However, the dialect has its own special characteristics such as continuous present which is formed by the past stem, a preverb shift, and the use of connective sounds. The dialect is in danger of extinction.

Nouns have two cases: direct and oblique. Contrary to the often case in Persian, adjective is not Post-positive.

The suffixes may be attached to the verb; the agent of the verb in an ergative construction; an adverb; a prepositional or postpositional phrase; and in a compound verb to its nominal Complement.

The same set of endings is used for the present and the subjunctive. The endings of the preterit and the present perfect are basically the enclitic present forms of the verb 'to be' (*ah-, here called base one). For pluperfect and subjunctive perfect the freestanding auxiliary verb 'to be' (*bav-, here called base two) is utilized. There is no ending for singular imperative and it is -ân for plural. For the inflections of "to be" see "Auxiliary inflection" below.

The past and present stems are irregular and shaped by historical developments, e.g.: ^{w}uj- / ^{w}ut- (to say); xaraš-/xarat- (to sell); taj-/tat- (to run). However, in many verbs the past stem is built on the present stem by adding -(e)st; e.g.: brem- → bremest- (to weep).

The imperative is formed by the modal prefix be- if the verb contains no preverb, plus the present stem and without ending in the singular and with -ân in the plural. be- is often changed to bi-, bo- or bu- according to the situation, and appears as b- before a vowel of a verbal stem.

=== Kiliti Tati ===
Kilit is a Tati dialect closely related to the Harzandi dialect and belongs to the northern Tati dialect cluster which consists of other transitional dialects between Tati and Zaza. It was spoken in the villages around Kilit in Nakhchivan, near the city of Ordubad. It was still used by speakers of the area as a second language in the 1950s. Spoken in Nakhchivan, the area near the Turkey border, the Kilit dialect was the northernmost and northwesternmost of the known Tati dialects.

== Classification ==
The Glottolog database proposes a detailed classification and classifies Tati (and its dialects) within the Adharic subgroup (related to Old Azeri), along with languages such as Talysh and Zaza. The Glottolog proposes the following phylogenetic classification:

- Northwestern Iranian
  - Adharic
    - Adhari (Old Azeri)
    - Zaza (Zaza): Southern Zaza (Dumbuli, Hazzu, Kori, Motki, Sivereki), Northern Zaza (Tunceli, Varto)
    - Tatic (Tati-Talysh)
      - Alamuti
      - Central Tatic: Khalkhali (Kajali, Karanic [Diz, Gandomabi, Hezarrudi Karan (Khoresh-e Rostam) Karnaq, Kelasi, Lerd, Nowkiani], Shahrudi -Southern Talysh ([Shali-Kolur, Shandermani, Southern Talysh, Massali Masulei]), Khoini, Maraghei [Dikini], North-Central Talysh (Central Talysh [Asalemi, Hashtpari], Northern Talysh [Astara, Lenkoran, Lerik], Taromic [Kabate, Kalasi, Upper Taromi]
      - Northern Tatic: Harzandi-Kilit (Harzandi, Kilit), Karingani-Kalasuri-Khoynarudi (Karingani, Kalasuri-Khoynarudi),
      - Southern Tatic: Alviri-Vidari (Alviri, Vidari), Vafsic (Ashtiani [Amorei, Kahaki, Nuclear Ashtiani, Tafresh], Vafsi), Ramand-Karaj: Eshtehardi, Razajerdi, Takestani (Khalkhal, Kharaqani, Ramandi, Tarom, Zanjan)
    - Gurani (Gorani): Gurani, Shabaki-Bajelani (Bajelani, Chabak, Sarli)

== Distribution ==
- Ardabil Province:
  - Khalkhal County:
    - Asbu, Derav, Kolur, Kehel, Askestan, Shal, Diz, Gandomabad, Karin, Lerd, Gilavan, Karnaq, Kajal (fa). (Kajali, Khoresh Rostam)
  - Namin County:
    - Tarom, Anbaran, Minabad, Mirzanaq, Kolosh, Sarvabad, Pilehrud (fa), Jeyd, Towlash, Upper Anbaran.
- East Azerbaijan Province:
  - Heris County:
    - Chay Kandi.
  - Marand County:
    - Harzand-e Atiq, Harzand-e Jadid, Galin Qayah. (Harzandi)
  - Kaleybar County:
    - Kalasur, Khunirud, Damirchi.
  - Varzaqan County:
    - Karangan. (Gozarkhani, Karingani)
- Nakhchivan Autonomous Republic:
  - Ordubad Rayon:
    - Kilit. (Kiliti)
- Alborz Province:
  - Karaj County:
    - Asara, Jey, Azadbar, Abharak, Adaran, Arangeh, Avizar, Ayegan, Bagh-e Pir, Purkan, Tekyeh-e Sepahsalar, Jurab, Charan, Hasanak Dar, Khvares, Khur, Khuzankola, Dardeh, Darvan, Sorkheh Darreh, Sar Ziarat, Sarv Dar, Siah Kalan, Sijan, Sira, Shelnak, Shahrestanak, Kalvan, Kalha, Kondor, Kushk-e Bala, Kohneh Deh, Kiasar, Kiasarlat, Garmab, Gasil, Gashnadar, Laniz, Leylestan, Malek Faliz, Murud, Meydanak, Nesa, Nasht-e Rud, Nowjan, Varangeh Rud, Varian, Varzan, Velayat Rud, Valeh, Vineh. (Karaji (fa))
  - Eshtehard County:
    - Eshtehard, Sehhatabad, Ahmadabad, Jafarabad, Mehdiabad, Fardabad, Mokhtarabad, Abdollahabad, Kushkabad, Palangabad, Moradabad, Morad Tappeh, Qezel Hesar, Rahmanieh, Oposhteh, Gong, Jaru, Nekujar, Bujafar.
  - Taleqan County. (Taleqani (fa))
- Tehran Province:
  - Damavand County:
    - Kilan, Absard.
- Markazi Province:
  - Zarandieh County:
    - Alvir, Vidar. (Alviri-Vidari)
  - Ashtian County
  - Tafresh County:
  - Kahak
  - Komijan County:
    - Vafs, Chehreqan, Farak, Gurchan. (Vafsi)
- Qazvin Province:
  - Qazvin County:
    - Kuchenan, Andaj, Alulak, Masoudabad, Zereshk, Voshteh, Taskin, Dastjerd-e Olya, Zarabad, Sapuhin, Mushqin, Vartavan, Halarud, Zanasuj, Avirak, Durchak, Suteh Kosh, Keshabad-e Olya, Keshabad-e Sofla, esmbord (fa), Dikin, Soleymanabad, Garmarud-e Sofla. (Maraghei, Shahrudi)
  - Takestan County:
    - Takestan, Esfarvarin, Qarqasin.
  - Buin Zahra County:
    - Danesfahan, Shal, Sagzabad, Ebrahimabad, Kharuzan, Khuznin, Khiaraj.
  - Abyek County:
    - Ziaran, Samghabad, Tikhor, Tudaran, Aqchari, Khuznan, Jazmeh, Atanak, Qazi Kalayeh, Ebrahimabad, Kahvan, Daral Sarvar, Miankuh, Kazlak, Yuj, Razjerd, Shinqar, Ardabilak, Mianbar, ShekarnabChanasak, Mazraeh -Gharib, Nowdeh,Kiadeh(Ziarani, Tikhori)
  - Zanjan County:
    - Sheykh Jaber.
  - Ijrud County:
    - Khoein, Saidabad-e Sofla, Sefid Kamar, Halab, Garneh. (Khoeini)
  - Tarom County.
    - Siyahvarud, Bandargah, Quhijan, Charazeh, Nukian, Hezarrud (fa).
- Gilan Province:
  - Rudbar County:
    - Eskabon, Anbuh, Aineh Deh, Bivarzin, Pa Rudbar, Pakdeh, Damash, Karamak-e Bala, Kalisham, Layeh, Miankushk (fa), Naveh, Now Deh, Viyeh, Yeknam.
- Semnan Province:
  - Garmsar County:
    - Eyvanki district
- North Khorasan Province:
  - Esfarayen County:
    - Adkan, Bidvaz.
  - Bojnord County:
    - Qaleh-ye Mohammadi, Gifan-e Pain, Gifan-e Bala, Mianzu, Rezqaneh.
  - Jajarm County:
    - Sankhvast, Do Borjeh, Tabar, Korf, Kharashah, Ghamiteh, Jorbat, Ark, Anduqan, Eslamabad (fa).
  - Shirvan County:
    - Barzali, Borzolabad Golian.

== Tati and Talysh ==
Tati and Talysh are Northwestern Iranian languages which are closely related. Although Talysh and Tati are two languages that have affected each other in various levels, the degree of this effect in different places are not the same. In fact, the very closeness of the two languages has been a major reason for impossibility of drawing clear borderlines between them. It happens that Tati varieties can be seen in the heart of Talysh districts, or Talysh varieties are found in the center of Tati districts. This claim is supported by focusing on linguistic characteristics of Tati and Talysh, the history of the interrelation between the two languages, geographical parameters of the area, as well as the phonological, morphological, and lexical examples.

=== Comparison of Talysh and various Tati dialects ===
English	Persian	Astārāi Talysh	Tākestāni Tāti	Sagzābādi Tāti	Ebrāhimābādi Tāti	Ardabilaki Tāti	Ziārāni Tāti	Kurmanji Kurdish
Down	پایین pāyin	jina جینه	jir جیر	jirā جیرا	jirā جیرا	jir جیر	jir/jirā جیرا/جیر	žêr, jêr
Father	پدر pedar	dādā دادا	dādā دادا	dada دده	dada دده	dādā/piyar پیر/دادا	dada/piyar پیر/دده	bav
Bitter	تلخ talx	tel تِل	tal تل	tal تل	tal تل	tal تل	tal تل	tel / tahel
Girl	دختر doxtar	kela کِلَه	titiye تیتیه	titia تی تیه	titia تی تیه	detari دتری	detari دتری	dot (daughter) keçek (girl)
Mad	دیوانه divāne	tur تور	tur تور	tur تور	tur تور	tur تور	tur تور	tûre, dîn
Woman	زن zan	žen ژِن	zeyniye زینیه	zania زنیه	zania زنیه	zen زِن	zenek زنک	žen, jin
White	سفید sefid	ispi ایسپی	isbi ایسبی	esbi اسبی	sebi سبی	sivid سوید	isbi ایسبی	sepî
Chicken	مرغ morq	kāg کاگ	karke کرکه	čarga چرگه	karga کرگه	kerg کرگ	kerg کرگ	mirîşk [merishk]
Ladder	نردبان nardebān	serd سِرد	aselte اَسلته	sorda سورده	sorda سورده		palkān/palkāna پلکانه/پلکان	nêrdevan, pêlik
Face	چهره čehre	dim دیم	dim دیم	dim دیم	dim دیم	dim دیم	dim دیم	dêm

=== Comparison of various Tati dialects ===
English	Persian	Tākestāni Tāti	Sagzābādi Tāti	Ebrāhimābādi Tāti	Ardabilaki Tāti	Ziārāni Tāti	Tikhuri Tāti	Tat	Kurmanji Kurdish	Sorani Kurdish
Child	بچه; Baĉĉe	zārin/bālā بالا/زارين	zāru زارو	zāru زارو	vaĉa وچه	eyāl عيال	vaĉa وچه	Ayal	Zārok Mendal baĉa	منداڵ; Mendāl / baĉka بەچکە
Rooftop	پشت بام; Poŝtebām/Bālābun	bon بُن	bun بون	bön بون	bom بوم	bum بوم	bum بوم	Sarbun	Bān	بان; Bān
Hand	دست; Dast	Bāl بال	bāl بال	Bāl بال	Bāl بال	Bāl بال	bāl بال	Dast	Dest / lep	دەست; Dast
Sharp	تيز; Tiz	Tij تيج	tij تيج	tij تيج	tij تيج	tij تيج	tij تيج	Tij	Tûž	تیژ; Tiž
Sister	خواهر; Xāhar	Xāke خاکه	Xawaĉe خواچه	xawāke خوآکه	xāxor خاخور	xoār خُوآر	xoār خُوآر	Xuvār	Xûşk / xweng	خوشک; Xûşk
Ablution/Wozu	وضو; Wozu/Dastnamāz	dasnemāz دسنماز	dasta māz دست ماز	dasnemāz دسنماز	dasnemāz دسنماز	dastnemāz دست نِماز	dastnemāz دست نِماز	Dastimāz	Destnimêj	دەستنوێژ; Destniwêj
Housewife	کدبانو; Kadbānu	keyvuniye/kalontare zeyniye کلُونتَره زينيه/کيوونيه	ĉeybānu چي بنوه	Keywānu کيوانو	Keywānu کيوانو	Kalentar کلنتر	xojirezan خوجيره زِن		Kebanî	کابان; Kaban
Lentil	عدس; Adas	marjomake مرجومکه	marjewa مرجوه	marjewa مرجوه	marju مرجو	marju مرجو	marju مرجو	Marjimak	nîsk	نیسک; Nîsk
Calm	آرام; Ārām/Denj	dinj دينج	dinj دينج	dinj دينج	dinj دينج	dinj دينج	dinj دينج	Dinj	aram	ئارام / بێدەنگ; Aram / Bêdeng
Shout	فرياد; Faryād	Harāy هرای	Harāy/qia قيه/هرای	harāy/qeya قيه/هرای	harāy/qiyu قيو/هرای	Qālmeqāl/harāy هرای/قال مِقال	Mara هَرَه	Jirā/Faryād	Hewar/qîr	هاوار; Hawar

English	Persian	Pahlavi	Avestan	Tākestāni Tāti	Sagzābādi Tāti	Ebrāhimābādi Tāti	Ardabilaki Tāti	Ziārāni Tāti	Tikhuri Tāti	Kurmanji Kurdish	Sorani Kurdish
Dog	سگ; Sag	sege	span	asbe/māĉĉiye ماچيه/اَسبه	Asba اَسبه	asba اَسبه	Sag سگ	Sage/māĉĉe ماچه/سَيگ	Sag/Māĉĉe ماچه/سَيگ	Kûçik / Seg	سەگ; Seg
Bone	استخوان; Ostexān	ast/xastak	ast	esqonj اسقُنج	Xaste خسته	Xaste خسته	Esdeqān اسدقان	Hasta هَستَه	hasta هَستَه	estî / hestî	ئێسک / هێسک; Êsk / Hêsk
Lie	دروغ; Doruq	drog/droo	droj	duru دورو	deru درو	doru دُرو	duru دورو	duru دورو	duru دورو	Derew / vir	درۆ; Diro
Needle	سوزن; Suzan	darzik/darzi	dereza	darzone درزُنه	darzena درزنه	darzena درزنه	darzan درزَن	darzen درزِن	darzen درزِن	Derzî, Şûjin (big needle)	دەرزی; Derzî
Face	چهره; Ĉehre	ĉihr/ĉihrak		dim دیم	dim دیم	dim دیم	dim دیم	dim دیم	dim دیم	Dêm	دەم و چاو/ ڕوو; Dem û çaw / Rû
Groom	داماد; Dāmād	zāmāt	zāmātar	zomā زُما	Zummā زوما	zeymā زیما	zāmā زاما	zāmā زاما	zāmā زاما	Zava	زاوا; Zawa
House	خانه; Xāne	Mābān	ke	kiye کیه	čia چیه	kia کیه	Xāne خانه	Xāneh خانه	Xāneh خانه	Xanî	خانوو / خانی; Xanû / Xanî
Man	مرد; Mard	mart	mereta	mardak مردک	miarda میرده	miarda میرده	Mardi مِردی	Mardak مَردِک	Mardak مَردِک	Mêr	پیاو / مەرد; Piyaw / Merd
Lamb	بره; Barre	varrak		Ware وَره	Wara وره	Wara وره	vara وره	vara وره	vara وره	Berx	بەرخ; Berx
Bride	عروس; Arus	vazyok	vaze	Weye ویه	Weya ویه	veya ویه		ayris/eris عریس/عَی ریس	ayris/eris عریس/عَی ریس	Bûk	بووک; Bûk
Nose	بینی; Bini	Pini	Pini	vinniye وینیه	venia ونیه	venia ونیه	vini وینی	vini وینی	vini وینی	Poz (nose) /Bîhn (smell)	لووت / کەپوو / بۆن; Lût / Kepû / Bon (smell)
Wolf	گرگ; Gorg	Gourg	vehraka	varg ورگ	varg ورگ	varg ورگ	verg وِرگ	gurg گورگ	gurg گورگ	Gur	گورگ; Gurg
