= Gifan =

Gifan (Persian: گيفان) may refer to:

- Gifan-e Bala
- Gifan-e Pain
- Gifan Rural District
