= Karingani language =

Northwestern Iranian language

Karingani
- ئؽۆلو آسمايى
- Native to: Iran
- Region: Karangan, Kalasur and Khunirud
- Native speakers: 22,000 (2019)
- Language family: Indo-European: Indo-Iranian; Iranian; Western; Northwestern; Tatic; Northern Tatic; Karingani-Kalasuri-Khoynarudi; Karingani
- Dialects: Karingani; Kalasuri-Khoynarudi

Language codes
- ISO 639-3: kgn
- Glottolog: kari1303
- ELP: Karingani

Karingani is a Northwestern Iranian language and is a dialect of the Tati language of Iran. It is closely related to the Kalāsuri-Khoynarudi dialects and Harzandi and Kilit. It is spoken in East Azerbaijan Province, in the Dizmar district, Keringan, Kalasur and Khunirud villages.

== Sources ==
- Frawley, William J. (2003). International Encyclopedia of Linguistics. Vol. 3. Oxford University Press. ISBN 0195139771.
