= Keshabad =

Keshabad (Persian: كش اباد) may refer to:

- Keshabad-e Olya, Qazvin Province
- Keshabad-e Sofla, Qazvin Province
