= Qatlish =

Qatlish and Katlish (Persian: قتليش) may refer to:

- Qatlish-ye Olya
- Qatlish-ye Sofla
