= Talysh language =

Northwestern Iranian language spoken in Northern Iran and Southern Azerbaijan

Talysh
- Tolışə zıvon Tолышә зывон تؤلشه زوؤن
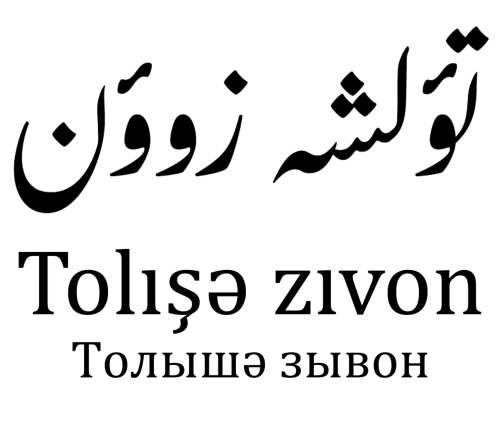
- Talysh written in Nastaliq script (تؤلشه زوؤن), Latin script (Tolışə zıvon), and Cyrillic script (Tолышә зывон)
- Native to: Iran; Azerbaijan
- Region: Western and Southwestern Caspian Sea coastal strip
- Ethnicity: Talysh
- Native speakers: (undated figure of 229,590)
- Language family: Indo-European: Indo-Iranian; Iranian; Western; Northwestern; Adharic/Caspian; Talysh
- Dialects: Northern Talysh; Central Talysh; Southern Talysh
- Writing system: Arabic (Persian alphabet) in Iran; Latin (Talysh alphabet) in Azerbaijan; Cyrillic in Russia

Official status
- Regulated by: Academy of Persian Language and Literature

Language codes
- ISO 639-3: tly
- Glottolog: taly1247 North-Central Talysh sout2639 Southern Talyshi
- ELP: Talysh
- Linguasphere: 58-AAC-ed

- Talysh is classified as Vulnerable by the UNESCO; Atlas of the World's Languages in Danger

Talysh (تؤلشه زوؤن, Tolışə Zıvon, Tолышә зывон) is a Northwestern Iranian language spoken in the northern regions of the Iranian provinces of Gilan and Ardabil and the southern regions of the Republic of Azerbaijan by the Talysh people. The Talysh language is closely related to the Tati and Zaza languages and shares common isogloss and many linguistic features, structures and characteristic words with both Zaza and Tati. Talysh, along with Zaza and Tati, is located at the westernmost part of the Western Iranian languages.

Talysh has three main dialects; northern, central and southern and these dialects consist of numerous sub-dialects. The northern dialect of the language is spoken in Azerbaijan and Iran, the central and southern dialects are spoken in Iran. The number of Talysh speakers was estimated to be around 218.000 people in 2016.

Talysh is partially, but not fully, mutually intelligible with Persian. Talysh is classified as "vulnerable" by UNESCO's Atlas of the World's Languages in Danger.

== History ==
The origin of the name Talysh is not clear but is likely to be quite old. The name of the people appears in early Arabic sources as Al-Taylasân and in Persian as Tâlišân and Tavâliš, which are plural forms of Tâliš. Northern Talysh (in the Republic of Azerbaijan) was historically known as Tâlish-i Guštâsbi. Talysh has always been mentioned with Gilan or Muqan. Writing in the 1330s AD, Hamdallah Mostowfi calls the language of Gushtaspi (covering the Caspian border region between Gilan to Shirvan) a Pahlavi language connected to the language of Gilan. Although there are no confirmed records, the language called in Iranian linguistics as Azari can be the antecedent of both Talysh and Tati. Miller's (1953) hypothesis that the Âzari of Ardabil, as appears in the quatrains of Shaikh Safi, was a form of Talysh was confirmed by Henning (1954). In western literature the people and the language are sometimes referred to as Talishi, Taleshi or Tolashi. Generally speaking, written documents about Taleshi are rare.

The first information about the Talysh language in Russian can be found in Volume X of Strachevsky's "Encyclopedic Dictionary" ("Справочный энциклопедический словарь"), published in St. Petersburg in 1848, which says:

The Talysh dialect is one of the six main dialects of Persian. It is used in the Talysh khanate and is probably the homeland of that language. Due to its grammatical and lexicographic forms, this language is noticeably different from other dialects. Except for the addition of the plural suffix "un", it is peculiar and is not derived from any Pahlavi or any other language. This language puts all relative pronouns before the noun, and the pronouns themselves are original in it.

The second information about the Talysh language is provided by Ilya Berezin, a professor at Kazan University, in Russian, but not in Russian, but in French. In 1853, Berezin's book on Persian grammar was published in Kazan. In the same year, his book "Recherches sur les dialectes persans" was published in Kazan. Experts still refer to this work as the first work of Russian Iranians in the field of Iranian dialectology. He used the "Talysh" songs given in A. Khodzko's work. IN Berezin's work consists of two parts - a grammatical essay and songs from A. Khodzko's work. IN Berezin writes that he conducted his research on Iranian dialects on the basis of materials he personally collected and studied, but does not write anywhere with whom, when and in what area he collected them. In the work, Talysh words are distorted. IN Berezin writes about the quartets taken from the work of A. Khodzko:

"Here I present to the reader a new translation of the Talysh, Gilan and Mazandaran songs and accompany them with critical notes; the Talysh texts, if not in Khodzko, were restored by me on the basis of his transcription." However, the author writes that "grammatical rules are not strictly observed in the Talysh language, as the verb's news form is usually confused almost all the time, i.e. instead of the aorist preterit, the future time in the present tense, etc. is used. " Going even further, he writes: "In the Talysh language, the verb is the most difficult, the most confusing and the most dubious part."

== Geography ==
In the north of Iran, there are six cities where Talysh is spoken: Masal, Rezvanshar, Talesh, Fuman, Shaft, and Masuleh (in these cities some people speak Gilaki and Turkish as well). The only towns where Talysh is spoken exclusively are the townships of Masal and Masuleh. In other cities, in addition to Talysh, people speak Gilaki and Azerbaijani. In Azerbaijan there are eight cities where Talysh is spoken: Astara (98%), Lerik (90%), Lenkoran (90%), Masalli (36%).

Talysh has been under the influence of Gilaki, Azeri Turkic, and Persian. In the south (Taleshdula, Masal, Shanderman, and Fumanat) the Talysh and Gilaks live side by side; however, there is less evidence that a Talysh family replaces Gilaki with its own language. In this region, the relation is more of a contribution to each other's language. In the north of Gilan, on the other hand, Azeri Turkic has replaced Talysh in cities such as Astara after the migration of Turkic speakers to the region decades ago. However, the people around Lavandvil and its mountainous regions have retained Talysh. Behzad Behzadi, the author of "Azerbaijani Persian Dictionary" remarks that: "The inhabitants of Astara are Talyshis and in fifty years ago (about 1953) that I remember the elders of our family spoke in that language and the great majority of dwellers also conversed in Talyshi. In the surrounding villages, a few were familiar with Turkic". From around Lisar up to Hashtpar, Azeri and Talysh live side by side, with the latter mostly spoken in small villages. To the south of Asalem, the influence of Azeri is negligible and the tendency is towards Persian along with Talysh in cities. In the Azerbaijan republic, Talysh is less under the influence of Azeri and Russian than Talysh in Iran is affected by Persian. Central Talysh has been considered the purest of all Talysh dialects.

== Classification and related languages ==
Talysh belongs to the Northwestern Iranian branch of Indo-European languages. The living language most closely related to Talysh is Tati. The Tati group of dialects is spoken across the Talysh range in the southwest (Kajal and Shahrud) and south (Tarom). This Tatic family should not be confused with another Tat family which is more related to Persian. Talysh also shares many features and structures with Zaza, now spoken in Turkey, and the Caspian languages and Semnani of Iran.

The Glottolog database proposes a detailed classification and classifies Talysh within the Adharic subgroup (related to Old Azeri), along with languages such as Zaza (spoken in Anatolia), Tati of Iran and its dialects such as Harzandi, Kajali and Kilit and Gorani. The Glottolog database proposes the following phylogenetic classification:

- Northwestern Iranian
  - Adharic
    - Adhari (Old Azeri)
    - Zaza (Zaza): Southern Zaza (Dumbuli, Hazzu, Kori, Motki, Sivereki), Northern Zaza (Tunceli, Varto)
    - Tatic (Tati-Talysh): Alamuti, Central Tat: Khalkhali (Kajali, Karanic [Diz, Gandomabi, Hezarrudi Karan (Khoresh-e Rostam) Karnaq, Kelasi, Lerd, Nowkiani], Shahrudi -Southern Talysh ([Shali-Kolur, Shandermani, Southern Talysh, Massali Masulei]), Khoini, Maraghei [Dikini], North-Central Talysh (Central Talysh [Asalemi, Hashtpari], Northern Talysh [Astara, Lenkoran, Lerik], Taromic [Kabate, Kalasi, Upper Taromi], Northern Tatic: Harzandi-Kilit (Harzandi, Kilit), Karingani-Kalasuri-Khoynarudi (Karingani, Kalasuri-Khoynarudi), Southern Tatic: Alviri-Vidari (Alviri, Vidari), Vafsic (Ashtiani [Amorei, Kahaki, Nuclear Ashtiani, Tafresh], Vafsi), Ramand-Karaj: Eshtehardi, Razajerdi, Takestani (Khalkhal, Kharaqani, Ramandi, Tarom, Zanjan)
    - Gorani (Gurani): Gurani, Shabaki-Bajelani (Bajelani, Chabak, Sarli)

== Dialects ==
Three Talysh dialects spoken in Iran and Azerbaijan.

The Talysh language has three main dialects; northern, central and southern. The northern dialect of the language is spoken in Azerbaijan and Iran, the central dialect and southern dialects are spoken in Iran. Since the northern dialect of the language is influenced by Azerbaijani and the southern dialects are influenced by Gilaki, the central dialect of the language is considered the purest one.

The division of Talysh into three clusters is based on lexical, phonological and grammatical factors. Northern Talysh distinguishes itself from Central and Southern Talysh not only geographically but culturally and linguistically as well. Speakers of Northern Talysh are found almost exclusively in the Republic of Azerbaijan but can also be found in the neighbouring regions of Iran, in the Province of Gilan. The varieties of Talysh spoken in the Republic of Azerbaijan are best described as speech varieties rather than dialects. Four speech varieties are generally identified on the basis of phonetic and lexical differences. These are labeled according to the four major political districts in the Talysh region: Astara, Lankaran, Lerik, and Masalli. The differences between the varieties are minimal at the phonetic and lexical level. Mamedov (1971) suggests a more useful dialectal distinction is one between the varieties spoken in the mountains and those spoken in the plains. The morphosyntax of Northern Talysh is characterized by a complicated split system which is based on the Northwest Iranian type of accusativity/ergativity dichotomy: it shows accusative features with present-stem-based transitive constructions, whereas past-stem-based constructions tend towards an ergative behavior. In distant regions such as Lavandevil and Masuleh, the dialects differ to such a degree that conversations begin to be difficult. In Iran, the northern dialect is in danger of extinction.

The major dialects of Talysh
Northern (in Azerbaijan Republic and in Iran (Ardabil and Gilan provinces) from Anbaran to Lavandevil) including:	Central (in Iran (Gilan province) from Haviq to Taleshdula/Rezvanshahr district) Including:	Southern (in Iran from Khushabar to Fumanat) including:
Astara, Lankaran, Lerik, Masalli, Karaganrud/Khotbesara, Lavandevil	Taleshdula, Asalem, Tularud	Khushabar, Shanderman, Masuleh, Masal, Siahmazgar

=== Some Northern dialects' differences ===
The northern dialect has some salient differences from the central and southern dialects, e.g.:

Taleshdulaei	Example	Lankarani	Example	Meaning
â	âvaina	u	uvai:na	mirror
â	dâr	u	du	tree
a	za	â	zârd	yellow
u/o	morjena	â	mârjena	ant
x	xetē	h	htē	to sleep
j	gij	ž	giž	confused

Alignment variation

The durative marker "ba" in Taleshdulaei changes to "da" in Lankarani and shifts in between the stem and person suffixes:

ba-žē-mun → žē-da-mun

Such a diversification exists in each dialect too, as in the case of Masali

== Phonology ==
The following is the Northern Talysh dialect:

=== Consonants ===
		Labial	Alveolar	Post- alveolar	Velar	Glottal
Plosive/ Affricate	voiceless	p	t	tʃ	k	
Plosive/ Affricate	voiced	b	d	dʒ	ɡ	
Fricative	voiceless	f	s	ʃ	x	h
Fricative	voiced	v	z	ʒ	ɣ	
Nasal		m	n			
Trill			r			
Approximant			l	j		

=== Vowels ===
	Front	Central	Back
High	i ~ ɪ	(ɨ)	u
High	ʏ		
Mid	e	ə	o ~ ɔ
Low	a ~ æ		ɑ

- [ʏ] only occurs in free variation with /u/, whereas /a/ is often palatalized as [æ].
- [ɪ, ɨ, ɔ] are heard as allophones of /i, ə, o/.
- Vowel sounds followed by a nasal consonant, /_nC/, often tend to be nasalized.

== Scripts ==
The vowel system in Talysh is more extended than in standard Persian. The prominent differences are the front vowel ü in central and northern dialects and the central vowel ə. In 1929, a Latin-based alphabet was created for Talysh in the Soviet Union. However, in 1938 it was changed to Cyrillic-based, but it did not gain extensive usage for a variety of reasons. An orthography based on Azeri Latin is used in Azerbaijan, and also in Iranian sources, for example on the IRIB's ParsToday website. The Perso-Arabic script is also used in Iran, although publications in the language are rare and are mostly volumes of poetry. The following tables contain the vowels and consonants used in Talysh. The sounds of the letters on every row, pronounced in each language, may not correspond fully.

=== Monophthongs ===
IPA	1929–1938	ISO 9	Perso-Arabic script	KNAB (199x^{(2.0)})	Cyrillic	Other Romanization	Example(s)
ɑː	a	a	آ, ا	a	а	â	âv
a ~ æ	a	a̋	َ, اَ	ǝ	ә	a, ä	asta
ə	ә	-	ِ, اِ or َ, اَ	ə	ə	e, a	esa
eː	e	e	ِ, اِ	e	е	e	nemek
o ~ ɔ	o	o	ا, ُ, و	o	о	o	šalvo
u	u	u	او, و	u	у	u	udmi
ʏ	u	-	او, و	ü	у	ü	salü, kü, düri, Imrü
ɪ ~ i	ъ	y	ای, ی	ı	ы	i	bila
iː	i	i	ای, ی	i	и	i, ị	neči, xist
Notes: ISO 9 standardization is dated 1995. 2.0 KNAB romanization is based on the Azeri Latin.

=== Diphthongs ===
IPA	Perso-Arabic script	Romanization	Example(s)
ɑːɪ	آی, ای	âi, ây	bâyl, dây
au	اَو	aw	dawlat
æɪ	اَی	ai, ay	ayvona, ayr
ou	اُو	ow, au	kow
eɪ	اِی	ey, ei, ay, ai	keybânu
æːə	اَ	ah	zuah, soahvona, buah, yuahnd, kuah, kuahj
eːə	اِ	eh	âdueh, sueh, danue'eh
ɔʏ	اُی	oy	doym, doymlavar

=== Consonants ===
IPA	1929–1938	ISO 9	Perso-Arabic script	KNAB (199x^{(2.0)})	Cyrillic	Other Romanization	Example(s)
p	p	p	پ	p	п	p	pitâr
b	в	b	ب	b	б	b	bejâr
t	t	t	ت, ط	t	т	t	tiž
d	d	d	د	d	д	d	debla
k	k	k	ک	k	к	k	kel
ɡ	g	g	گ	g	г	g	gaf
ɣ	ƣ	ġ	غ	ğ	ғ	gh	ghuša
q	q	k̂	ق	q	ҝ	q	qarz
tʃ	c, ç	č	چ	ç	ч	ch, č, c	čâki
dʒ	j	ĉ	ج	c	ҹ	j, ĵ	jâr
f	f	f	ف	f	ф	f	fel
v	v	v	و	v	в	v	vaj
s	s	s	س, ص, ث	s	с	s	savz
z	z	z	ز, ذ, ض, ظ	z	з	z	zeng
ʃ	ş	š	ش	ş	ш	sh	šav
ʒ	ƶ	ž	ژ	j	ж	zh	ža
x	x	h	خ	x	x	kh	xâsta
h	h	ḥ	ه, ح	h	һ	h	haka
m	m	m	م	m	м	m	muža
n	n	n	ن	n	н	n	nân
l	l	l	ل	l	л	l	lar
lʲ	-	-	-	-	-	-	xâlâ, avâla, dalâ, domlavar, dalaza
ɾ	r	r	ر	r	р	r	raz
j	y	j	ی	y	ј	y, j	yânza
Notes: ISO 9 standardization is dated 1995. 2.0 KNAB romanization is based on the Azeri Latin.

=== Differences from Persian ===
The general phonological differences of some Talysh dialects with respect to standard Persian are as follows:

Talysh sound	Talysh example word	Corresponding Persian sound	Persian example word	Translation
u	duna	â	dâne	seed
i	insân	initial e	ensân	human being
e	tarâze	u	terâzu	balance (the apparatus)
e	xerâk	o	xorâk	food
a in compound words	mâng-a-tâv	∅	mah-tâb	moonlight
v	âv	b	âb	water
f	sif	b	sib	apple
x	xâsta	h	âheste	slow
t	tert	d	tord	brittle
j	mija	ž	može	eyelash
m	šamba	n	šanbe	Saturday
∅	mēra	medial h	mohre	bead
∅	ku	final h	kuh	mountain

== Grammar ==
Talysh has a subject–object–verb word order. In some situations the case marker, 'i' or 'e' attaches to the accusative noun phrase. There is no definite article, and the indefinite one is "i". The plural is marked by the suffixes "un", "ēn" and also "yēn" for nouns ending with vowels. In contrast to Persian, modifiers are preceded by nouns, for example: "maryami kitav" (Mary's book) and "kava daryâ" (livid sea). Similar to most other Iranian dialects there are two categories of inflexion, subject and object cases. The "present stem" is used for the imperfect and the "past stem" for the present in the verbal system. That differentiates Talysh from most other Western Iranian dialects. In the present tense, verbal affixes cause a rearranging of the elements of conjugation in some dialects such as Tâlešdulâbi, e.g. for expressing the negation of b-a-dašt-im (I sew), "ni" is used in the following form: ni-m-a-dašt (I don't sew)."m" is first person singular marker, "a" denotes duration and "dašt" is the past stem.

=== Pronouns ===
Talysh is a null-subject language, so nominal pronouns (e.g. I, he, she) are optional. For first person singular, both "az" and "men" are used. Person suffixes are not added to stems for "men". Examples:

- men xanda. (I read.), az bexun-em (Should I read ...)
- men daxun! (Call me!), az-daxun-em (Should I call ...)

There are three prefixes in Talysh and Tati added to normal forms making possessive pronouns. They are: "če / ča" and "eš / še".

Normal Forms
	Singular	Plural
1st person	az/âz, men	ama
2nd person	te	šema
3rd person	ay	ayēn

Possessive Pronouns
	Singular	Plural
1st person	če-men, če-mi	ča-ma
2nd person	eš-te	še-ma
3rd person	ča-y, ča	čai:mun

=== Verbs ===
- preverbs: â/o, da, vi/i/ē/â, pē/pi
- Negative Markers: ne, nē, ni
- Subjunctive/Imperative prefix: be
- Durative markers: a, ba, da

The following Person Suffixes are used in different dialects and for different verbs.

Person Suffixes
	Singular	Plural
1st person	-em, -ema, -emē, -ima, -um, -m	-am, -emun(a), -emun(ē), -imuna, -imun
2nd person	-i, -er(a), -eyē, -išaو -š	-a, -erun(a), -eyunē, -iruna, -iyun
3rd person	-e, -eš(a), -eš(ē), -a, -ē, -u	-en, -ešun(a), -ešun(ē), -ina, -un

==== Conjugations ====
The past stem is inflected by removing the infinitive marker (ē), however the present stem and jussive mood are not so simple in many cases and are irregular. For some verbs, present and past stems are identical. The "be" imperative marker is not added situationally. The following tables show the conjugations for first-person singular of "sew" in some dialects of the three dialectical categories:

===== Stems and imperative mood =====
Stems and Imperative mood
	Northern (Lavandavili)	Central (Taleshdulaei)	Southern (Khushabari)	Tati (Kelori)
Infinitive	dut-ē	dašt-ē	dēšt-ē	dut-an
Past stem	dut	dašt	dēšt	dut
Present stem	dut	dērz	dērz	duj
Imperative	be-dut	be-dērz	be-dērz	be-duj

===== Active voice =====
Active Voice
Form	Tense	Northern (Lavandavili)	Central (Taleshdulaei)	Southern (Khushabari)	Tati (Kelori)
Infinitive	-	dut-ē	dašt-ē	dēšt-ē	dut-an
Indicative	Present	dute-da-m	ba-dašt-im	dērz-em	duj-em
„	Past	dut-emē	dašt-em	dēšt-em	bedut-em
„	Perfect	dut-amē	dašt-ama	dēšt-ama	dute-mē
„	Past imperfective	dute-aymē	adērz-ima	dērz-ima	duj-isēym
„	Past perfect	dut-am bē	dašt-am-ba	dēšt-am-ba	dut-am-bē
„	Future	pima dut-ē	pima dašt-ē	pima dēšt-ē	xâm dut-an
„	Present progressive	dute da-m	kâr-im dašt-ē	kâra dērz-em	kerâ duj-em
„	Past progressive	dut dab-im	kârb-im dašt-ē	kârb-im dēšt-ē	kerâ duj-isēym
Subjunctive	Present	be-dut-em	be-dērz-em	be-dērz-em	be-duj-em
„	Past	dut-am-bu	dašt-am-bâ	dēšt-am-bu	dut-am-bâ
Conditional	Past	dut-am ban	ba-dērz-im	be-dērz-im	be-duj-im

===== Passive voice =====
Passive Voice
Form	Tense	Northern (Lavandavili)	Central (Taleshdulaei)	Southern Khushabari)	Tati (Kelori)
Infinitive	-	dut-ē	dašt-ē	dēšt-ē	dut-an
Indicative	Present	duta bē dam	dašta babim	dēšta bum	duta bum
„	Preterite	duta bēm	dašta bima	dēšta bima	bedujisim
„	Imperfective preterite	duta be-am be	dašta abima	dēšta bistēm	duta bisim
„	Perfect	duta beam	dašta baima	dērzistaima	dujisim
„	Pluperfect	duta beam bē	dērzista bim	dērzista bim	dujisa bim
„	Present progressive	duta bē dam	kâra dašta babima	kšra dēšta bum	kerâ duta bum
„	Preterite progressive	duta bēdabim	kâra dašta abima	kâra dēšta bistēymun	kerâ duta bisim
Subjunctive	Present	duta bebum	dašta bebum	dēšta bebum	duta bebum
„	Preterite	duta beabum	dašta babâm	dēšta babâm	dujisa biya-bâm

=== Nouns and adpositions ===
There are four "cases" in Talysh, the nominative (unmarked), the genitive, the (definite) accusative and ergative.

The nominative case (characterized by null morpheme on nouns) encodes the subject; the predicate; the indefinite direct object in a nominative clause; definite direct object in an ergative clause; the vowel-final main noun in a noun phrase with another noun modifying it; and, finally, the nominal element in an adpositional phrases with certain adpositions. The examples below are from Pirejko 1976

Nənə ıştə zoə pe-də
mother REFL son love.VN-LOC
'The mother loves her son'

Əv rəis-e
3SG boss-PRED
'S/he is a boss'

Az vıl bı-çın-ım bo tını
1SG flower FUT-pick.PRST-FUT for 2SG.ERG
'I will pick a flower for you'

Əy çımı dəftər dıry-əşe
3SG.ERG 1SG.POSS notebook tear.apart.PP-3SG.PFV.TR
'S/he tore apart my notebook'

hovə şol
sister scarf
'sister's scarf'

bə şəhr
to city
'to the city'

The ergative case, on the other hand, has the following functions: indicating the subject of an ergative phrase; definite direct object (in this function, ergative case takes the form of -ni after vowel-final stems); nominal modifier in a noun phrase; the nominal element in adpositional phrases with most adpositions.

Ağıl-i sef şo do-şe
child-ERG apple ? throw.PP-3SG.PFV.ERG
'the child threw the apple'

Im kəpot-i se-də-m bə həvə-yo
DEM dress-ERG buy.VN-LOC-1SG for sister-BEN
'I'm buying this dress for (my) sister'

Iştə zoə-ni voğan-də bə məktəb
REFL son-ERG send.VN-LOC to school
'S/he is sending his/her son to the school'

jen-i dəs
woman-ERG hand
'a hand's woman'

muallimi-i ton-i-ku omə-m
teacher-ERG side-ERG-ABL come.1SG.PP-PFV.NOM
'I approached the teacher'

The accusative form is often used to express the simple indirect object in addition to the direct object. These "cases" are in origin actually just particles, similar to Persian prepositions such as "râ".

Case markers and prepositions
Case	Marker	Example(s)	Persian	‌	English
Nominative	-	sepa ve davaxa.	Sag xeyli hâfhâf kard.	‌	The dog barked much.
Accusative	-i	gerd-i âda ba men	Hame râ bede be man.	‌	Give them all to me!
„	-e	âv-e-m barda	Âb râ bordam.	‌	I took the water.
Ablative	-kâ, -ku (from)	ba-i-kâ-r če bapi	Az u ce mixâhi?	‌	What do you want from him?
„	-ka, -anda (in)	âstâra-ka tâleši gaf bažēn	Dar Âstârâ Tâleši gab (harf) mizanand.	‌	They talk Talyshi in Astara.
„	-na (with)	âtaši-na mezâ maka	Bâ âtaš bâzi nakon.	‌	Don't play with fire!
„	-râ, -ru (for)	me-râ kâr baka te-râ yâd bigē	Barâye man kâr bekon Barâye xodat yâd begir.	‌	Work for me, learn for yourself.
„	-ken (of)	ha-ken hēsta ča (čečiya)	Az ân, ce bejâ mânde? (Hamân ke hast, cist?)	‌	What is of which is left?
„	ba (to)	ba em denyâ del mabēnd	Be in donyâ del maband.	‌	Don't take the world dear to your heart!
Ergative	-i	a palang-i do lorzon-i (Aorist)	Ân palang deraxt râ larzând.	‌	That leopard shook the tree.

== Vocabulary ==
English	Talysh	Central (Taleshdulaei)	Southern (Khushabari / Shandermani)	Tati (Kelori / Geluzani)	Zaza	Persian	Kurmanji Kurdish
big	pilla	?	yâl	yâl	gird, pîl	bozorg, gat, (yal, pil)	gir, mezin
boy, son	zâ	zoa, zua	zôa, zue	zu'a, zoa	laj / laz / lac	Pesar	law (boy), kur (son)
bride	vayu, vēi	vayü	vayu	gēša, veyb	veyve	arus	bûk
cat	pešu	kete, pišik, piš	peču	peču, pešu, piši	pisîng, xone (tomcat)	gorbe, piši	pisîk, kitik
cry (v)	beramesan	bamē	beramestē	beramē	bermayen	geristan	girîn
daughter, girl (little)	kille, kilik	kina, kela	kilu, kela	kina, kel(l)a	kêna/keyna, çêna	doxtar	keç (girl), dot (daughter)
day	ruz	rüž, ruj	ruz	ruz, roz	roc, roz, roj	ruz	roj
eat (v)	hardan	hardē	hardē	hardē	werden	xordan	xwarin
egg	xâ, merqowna	uva, muqna, uya	âgla	merqona	hak	toxme morq	hêk
eye	čašm	čâš	čaš, čam	čēm	çim	čašm	çav
father	pē	dada, piya, biya	dada	?	pî, pêr, bawk, babî	pedar	bav
fear (v)	tarsesan	purnē, târsē	târsinē, tarsestē	tarsē	tersayen	tarsidan	tirsîn
flag	?	filak	parčam	?	ala	parčam, derafš	ala
food	xuruk	xerâk	xerâk	xerâk	nan, werd	xorâk	xwarin
go (v)	šiyan	šē	šē	šē	şîyen	raftan (šodan)	çûn
house	ka	ka	ka	ka	keye, çeye	xâne	xanî
language; tongue	zuân	zivon	zun	zavon	ziwan, zon	zabân	ziman
moon	mung, meng	mâng, uvešim	mâng	mang	aşme	mâh	heyv / hîv
mother	mâ, dēdē, nana	mua, mu, nana	nana	?	maye, mare, dayîke, dadî	mâdar, nane	mak, dayik
mouth	gar	qav, gav	ga, gav, ga(f)	qar	fek	dahân, kak	dev
night	šav	šav	şaw	šav	şew	šab	şev
north	?	kubasu	šimâl	?	zime, vakur	šemâl	bakur
high	berenj	berz	berz	berj	berz	boland	bilind, berz
say (v)	vâtan	votē	vâtē	vâtē	vatene	goftan	gotin
sister	xâv, xâ	huva, hova, ho	xâlâ, xolo	xâ	waye	xâhar	xwîşk, xwang
small	velle, xš	ruk, gada	ruk	ruk	qic, qij, wirdî	kučak	biçûk, qicik
sunset	?	šânga	maqrib	?	rocawan rojawan	maqreb	rojava
sunshine	?	şefhaši	âftâv	?	tije, zerq	âftâb	tîroj, tav/hetav
water	âv	uv, ôv	âv	âv	aw, awk	âb	av
woman, wife	zanle, zan	žēn	žēn, žen	yen, žen	cinî	zan	jin
yesterday	zir	zina	zir, izer	zir, zer	vizêr	diruz, di	duh/diho
