= Ehsan Yarshater =

Iranian historian and linguist (1920–2018)

- احسان یارشاطر
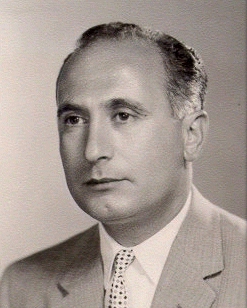
- Portrait photograph, January 1950
- Born: Ehsanollah Yarshater; April 3, 1920; Hamadan, Sublime State of Iran
- Died: September 2, 2018 (aged 98); Fresno, California, U.S.
- Education: University of Tehran; School of Oriental and African Studies; University of London
- Occupations: Historian; linguist
- Years active: 1953–2018
- Known for: Director of the Center for Iranian Studies at Columbia University
- Notable work: Encyclopædia Iranica
- Spouse: Latifeh Alvieh (died 1999)
- Parent(s): Hashem Yarshater (father); Rohaniyeh Misaghie (mother)
- Awards: Bita Award (2015)

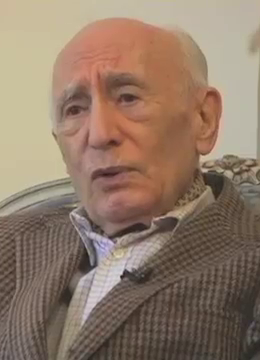
Ehsan Yarshater (2011)

Ehsan Yarshater (Persian: احسان يارشاطر; April 3, 1920 – September 1, 2018) was an Iranian historian and linguist who specialized in Iranology. He was the founder and director of the Center for Iranian Studies, and Hagop Kevorkian Professor Emeritus of Iranian Studies at Columbia University.

He was the first Persian full-time professor at a U.S. university since World War II.

He was one of the 40 editors of the Encyclopædia Iranica, with articles by 300 authors from various academic institutions. He also edited the third volume of The Cambridge History of Iran, comprising the history of the Seleucids, the Parthians, and the Sassanians, and a volume entitled Persian Literature. He was also an editor of a sixteen-volume series named History of Persian Literature. He had won several international awards for scholarship, including a UNESCO award in 1959, and the Giorgio Levi Della Vida Medal for Achievement in Islamic Studies from UCLA in 1991. Lecture series in his name have been instituted at the Harvard University, the University of London, the University of California, Los Angeles, the University of Maryland and the Centre National de Recherche Scientifique in Paris.

== Life and career ==
Born in Hamedan, Iran, Ehsan Yarshater studied Persian language and literature at the University of Tehran and Iranian philology (Old and Middle Iranian) at the School of Oriental and African Studies (SOAS), University of London with Walter Bruno Henning. His Tehran University dissertation dealt with Persian poetry under the Timurid Shahrukh (15th century). His University of London dissertation, elaborated and published later as A Grammar of Southern Tati Dialects (Mouton, 1969), describes a series of Tati dialects spoken in the southwest of Qazvin.

He had published a number of articles on modern western Iranian dialects, notably Tati and Taleshi, and the Jewish dialects of Persian (including Lotara'i), and on Persian mythology.

His parents were Iranian Jews who had converted to the Baháʼí Faith, but he had no affiliation with the Baháʼí Faith as an adult.

== Bibliography ==
- Theorems and Remarks (al-Isharat wa'l-tanbihat) by Avicenna, tr. into Persian in the 13th century; annotated edition. Tehran, National Monuments Society, 1953.
- Five Treaties in Arabic and Persian (Panj Resala) by Ibn Sina, annotated edition. Tehran, National Monuments Society, 1953.
- Šeʿr-e fārsi dar ʿahd-e Šāhroḵ yā āḡāz-e enḥeṭāṭ dar šeʿr-e farsi ("Persian Poetry under Shah Rokh: The Second Half of the 15th Century or the beginning of decline in Persian poetry"). Tehran, Tehran University Press, 1955.
- Legends of the Epic of Kings (Dastanha-ye Shahnama). Tehran: Iran-American Joint Fund Publications, 1957, 1958, 1964; 2nd ed. 1974, 1982 (awarded a UNESCO prize in 1959).
- Old Iranian Myths and Legends (Dastanha-ye Iran-e bastan). Tehran: Iran-American Joint Fund Publications, 1957, 1958, 1964 (Royal Award for the best book of the year, 1959).
- With W.B. Henning (eds.). A Locust's Leg: Studies in Honour of S.H. Taqizadeh. London, 1962.
- Modern Painting (Naqqashi-e novin). 2 vols. Tehran: Amir Kabir, 1965–66; 2nd printing, 1975.
- A Grammar of Southern Tati Dialects, Median Dialect Studies I. The Hague and Paris, Mouton and Co., 1969.
- Iran Faces the Seventies (ed.). New York, Praeger Publishers, 1971.
- With D. Bishop (eds.). Biruni Symposium. New York, Center for Iranian Studies, Columbia University, 1976.
- Selected Stories from the Shahnama (Bargozida-ye dastanha-ye Shahnama), Vol. I. Tehran, BTNK, 1974; reprint, Washington, D.C., Iranian Cultural Foundation, 1982.
- With David Bivar (eds.). Inscriptions of Eastern Mazandaran, Corpus Inscriptionem Iranicarum. London, Lund and Humphries, 1978.
- With Richard Ettinghausen (eds.). Highlights of Persian Art. New York, Bibliotheca Persica, 1982.
- Sadeq Hedayat: An Anthology (ed.). New York, Bibliotheca Persica, 1979.
- Cambridge History of Iran, Vol. III: Seleucid, Parthian and Sassanian Periods (ed.). Cambridge, Cambridge University Press, 1983.
- Persian Literature (ed.). New York, State University of New York Press, 1988.
- History of Al-Tabari: Volumes 1-40 (ed.). New York, State Univ of New York Press, 2007.

== See also ==
- Iranistics
- List of Iranian scientists
