= Shahrudi =

Shahrudi may be,

- Shahrudi language
- Mahmud Hashemi-Shahrudi
