= Murud =

Murud may refer to:

- Murud, Iran, a village in Alborz Province, Iran
- Murud, Latur, a town in Latur district, Maharashtra, India
- Murud, Raigad, a town in Raigad district, Maharashtra, India
  - Murud-Janjira, a fort on an island near Murud, Raigad
- Murud, Ratnagiri, a town in Ratnagiri district, Maharashtra, India
- Mount Murud, a mountain in Sarawak, Malaysia.
