= Khavin =

Khavin may refer to:

- Khavin Rood, a village in Misheh Pareh Rural District, Kaleybar County, East Azerbaijan Province, Iran
- Abram Khavin (1914–1974), Ukrainian chess master
- Victor Khavine or Victor Havin, Russian mathematician
