= Maraghei =

Maraghei may be,

- Maraghei dialect of Tati

== People ==
- Mohammad Said Maraghei, Prime Minister of Iran
- Rahmatollah Moghaddam Maraghei
- Zeyn al-Abedin Maraghei
