= Karani language =

Karani may be:

- Caranqui language of Ecuador
- Karan language of Iran
