= Shahrak-e Qaleh Juq-e Bozorg =

Village in North Khorasan province, Iran

Shahrak-e Qaleh Juq-e Bozorg Persian: شهرك قلعه جق بزرگ
- Village
- Location within Iran
- Coordinates: 37°47′16″N 57°22′14″E
- Country: Iran
- Province: North Khorasan
- County: Bojnord
- District: Garmkhan
- Rural District: Gifan

Population (2016)
  - Total: 1,341
- Time zone: UTC+3:30 (IRST)

Shahrak-e Qaleh Juq-e Bozorg (Persian: شهرك قلعه جق بزرگ) (Note: Also romanized as Shahrak-e Qal‘eh Jūq-e Bozorg; also known as Qal‘eh Jūq-e Bozorg) is a village in Gifan Rural District of Garmkhan District in Bojnord County, North Khorasan province, Iran.

== Demographics ==
=== Population ===
At the time of the 2006 National Census, the village's population was 1,344 in 288 households. The following census in 2011 counted 1,381 people in 265 households. The 2016 census measured the population of the village as 1,341 people in 315 households, the most populous in its rural district.
