= Izman-e Bala =

Village in North Khorasan province, Iran

Izman-e Bala Persian: ايزمان بالا
- Village
- Location within Iran
- Coordinates: 37°49′21″N 57°29′58″E
- Country: Iran
- Province: North Khorasan
- County: Bojnord
- District: Garmkhan
- Rural District: Gifan

Population (2016)
  - Total: 442
- Time zone: UTC+3:30 (IRST)

Izman-e Bala (Persian: ايزمان بالا) (Note: Also romanized as Īzmān-e Bālā) is a village in Gifan Rural District of Garmkhan District in Bojnord County, North Khorasan province, Iran.

== Demographics ==
=== Population ===
At the time of the 2006 National Census, the village's population was 532 in 93 households. The following census in 2011 counted 430 people in 120 households. The 2016 census measured the population of the village as 442 people in 125 households.
