= Kilit dialect =

Historic Iranian dialect

Kilit
- Native to: Azerbaijan
- Region: Nakhchivan
- Extinct: after 1950s
- Language family: Indo-European: Indo-Iranian; Iranian; Western Iranian; Northwestern Iranian; Adharic; Tatic; Northern Tatic; Harzandi-Kilit; Kilit

Language codes
- ISO 639-3: –
- Glottolog: kili1273
- Kilit is classified as Extinct according to the UNESCO Atlas of the World's Languages in Danger.
- Coordinates: 38°56.7′N 46°5.9′E

Kilit is an extinct dialect of Tati language that is closely related to Harzandi. It is an Iranian dialect of Azerbaijan that is closely related to Talysh. It is probably a dialect of Iranian Tati, otherwise found only in Iran, specifically a subdialect of Harzandi. It was spoken in the villages around Kilit, located 12 kilometers southwest from the city of Ordubad in a district with the same name of Nakhchivan in Azerbaijan. It was still used by non-native speakers as a second language in the 1950s.

The dialect was reported to be spoken in some settlements in Nakhchivan, South Azerbaijan. In addition to Kilit, the region where it was mainly spoken, the dialect was also spoken in Baba Yaqub and other nearby settlements. Kilit, which was spoken north of the Aras River, was the northernmost and northwesternmost of the known Tati dialects.

== Classification ==
Kiliti is a Tati dialect belonging to the Northwestern Iranian languages branch and is closely related to Harzandi. Although scarce data exist on Kiliti, its closest surviving relative Harzandi, is considered a transitional dialect between Talysh and Zaza.

== History ==
The language has been long known to the Russian historians and travelers since the middle of nineteenth to the mid-twentieth centuries. Russian historian Ivan Chopin, first mentioned the Kilit dialect and Kilit people back in 1852. He stated that the language of the Kilit people did not resemble any of the local dialects and the Kilit people could be remnants of one of the indigenous tribes of ancient Armenia living there or they could be Talysh, Tat, Tajik or Hebrew origin. He also stated the inhabitants of the village as amounting to 104. Zelinsky researched the language in 1880. He compiled records about Kilit and stated that in the Ordubad region, in the village of Kilit, people spoke a completely different dialect and their language might be a mixture of Kurdish, Persian, and Arabic words. After them, several other individual researchers who heard about the existence of an unintelligible dialect also came to the region to research the dialect and described Kilit as a dialect unintelligible to anyone. In the 1950s a few speakers was reported who used the language probably only as a trade lingo or secret language. In 1966, A. G. Gasanov collected a few words and phrases. Although the possibility of a migration cannot be ruled out, however it is more likely, given more data about Tatic languages and proto-Tatic, that this group extended at least as far as the areas in which the remanent languages are spoken today.

== Some available materials ==
The following is a Kiliti text reported by Zelinsky: Transliterated from Cyrillic:

English	Kiliti	Talyshi (Taleshdulaei)	Persian	Tat
When Duke General came,	vahti knâz' aslnda eranali èmiabia,	vaqti sardăr ăma,	väqti duk ženeral amäd,	vəxtikə general ama,
he asked me:	manè èštaša:	ba mәnkăš xăsta:	az män xast:	əz mən xast:
"Speak in your language so I see what is your language".	"bi šema zun kasaka man vinèm ki, šema zun kalang zuna".	"ba әštan zәvon gaf bәžan bәvinom šәma zәvon kamila"	"be zäbane xodetan soxän begu bebinäm ke, zäbane šoma kodam zäban äst"	"bə zuhun xištənšmu gaf san vünüm ki, zuhunšmu kami zuhunü"
Whatever he asked me (got information from me), I said then.	ha či ki, èšman haba èškata, mandže votma.	ba mәnka harčә kәn dafarsәsta mәnin văta.	här če ke, äz män porsid (xäbär gereft), män häm goftäm.	hər čü ki, əz mən xəbər asta, məniš guftirüm.
He asked me how we counted.	èšman haba èškata ki, ki kalang ašmardia.	ba mәnkă dafarsәst čәntarin bašmard.	äz män xäbär gereft ke, čegune mišemarid.	əz mən xəbər asta ki, tə bə čənta bəšümərdənind.
Then I counted up to hundred.	mandže ašmar dema desta sa.	mәnin әšmarda dă sad.	män häm šemordäm ta be säd.	məniš šümərdüm tə bə sad.
That General wanted me to come to him.	o eranal manè èštaša kûsèš.	a sardări ba mәnkă xăsta bәšom čai var.	an ženeral äz män xast pišäš beräväm.	un general əz mən xast bətəni baram.
He asked me: "Where do you stay?"	èšman haba èškata: "kèing mandaniš?"	ba mәnka dafarsa: "kiyă bamandiš?"	äz män xäbär gereft: "koja mimani?"	əz mən xəbər asta: "bečə bəmundəni?"
Then I said that "dismiss me, I will go to my home".	mandže votma ki, "manu murahast kai, manèm kaim".	mәnin văta kәn, "ama bәrăxәn bašimon әštan ka".	män häm goftäm ke, "mära moräxäs kon, miräväm xaneäm".	məniš guftirüm ki, "mənə raha tin, maram bə xuneymə".
He said: "No, you should stay here".	votma: "na, pista na haingu muni".	vătәš: "ne, pi hiyă bәmona".	goft: "nä, bayäd häminja bemani".	gufti: "nə, gərək incə muni".
I said then: "That is your will,	mandže votma: "ihtio hesta,	mәnin văta: "әm әštә xăstaya,	män häm goftäm: "in xaste to äst,	məniš guftirüm: "in xasteytürü,
you tell me to stay,	votim manem,	bătiš bәmonәm,	miguyi bemanäm,	bətəni munüm,
so I (will stay) for the night."	šav mandže".	azni šav (bamandim)".	män häm šäb (mimanäm)".	məniš šöü (immunüm)".
Whatever he asked me, I said then.	ha či oj èščaman haba èškata, mandže votma.	harči ba mәnka dafarsәst mәnin văta.	här če ke äz män xäbär gereft, män häm goftäm.	hər čü əz mən xəbər asta, məniš guftirüm.

Comparative list of numbers and some words mentioned by Zelinsky and Gasanov:

English	Kiliti	Talyshi	Persian	Tat
mouth	gav	gäv	dähan	duhun
brother	bole	bәră, boli	bäradär	birar
nut	zuz	viz, voz, yuz	gerdu (jowz)	xadžamaz
where	henda	kiya, ku	koja	bečə/čüdža
bring	bija	bәjär	bijar	bijar
braised meat	gail	gäylä, kavab	gušte beryan	kabab
said	gäji	vateš	goft	gufti
wild	èšivin	ašyă, èšivo (bear)	vahši, dädmäneš	vəhši
1	ivi	i	jek	jeki
2	dèv	dy, de	do	düta
3	he	se	se	səta
4	čoj	čo, ču, čar	čähar	čarta
5	pindž	pendž, penj	pändž	pandžta
6	šaš	šäš	šeš	šešta
7	haft	haft	häft	həfta
8	hašt	häšt	häšt	həšta
9	nav	näv, nä	noh	nüta
10	dah	da	däh	dəta
11	dahai jonzä	davy-i, yănza	jazdäh	dəyekta

English	Kiliti	Talyshi	Persian	Tat
12	dahadèv donzä	davy-dy, dave-de, danza	dävazdäh	dədüta
13	dahahe senzä	davy-se, dave-se, sinza	sinzdäh	dəsəta
14	dahačio čordä	davy-čo, dave-ču, čardä	čahardäh	dəčarta
15	dahapind ponzä	davy-pendž, dave-pendž, panzä	panzdäh	dəpandžta
16	dahašaš šonzä	davy-šäš, dave-šäš, šanzä	šanzdäh	dəšešta
17	dahahaft havdä	davy-haft, dave-haft, hivdä	hevdäh	dəhəfta
18	dahahašt häždä	davy-häšt, dave-häšt, häždä	hiždäh	dəhəšta
19	dahanav nonzä	davy-näv, dave-näv, nuzda	nuzdäh	dənüta
20	vist	vist, bist	bist	bista
30	si	si	si	sita
40	čel'	čyl, čel	čehel	čülta
50	pindžoj	pendžo, pendža	pändžah	pandžata
60	šešt	šest, šäst	šäst	səbista
70	havta	hafto, hatu, häftad	häftad	səbistdəta
80	hašta	häšto, häštu, häštad	häštad	čarbista
90	vahta	näve, näved, näväd	näväd	čarbistdəta
100	sa	sa, säd	säd	sad
1000	hačoj	häzo, häzu, häzar	hezar	həzar

== The identity ==
Chopin remarks that the inhabitants of Kilit village were professing Shiite faith and their language is not similar to any of the other local dialects. However he has been puzzled about their origin. He mentioned that they might be from Armenian origin or more likely Talyshi, Tat, Tajik or Zoroastrian. Zelinsky considered it as a mixture of Kurdish, Persian and Arabic. Gasanov called it with a certain affinity towards Iranian languages. But only Zelinsky's materials are enough to understand that kiliti is not an argot, possesses an independent grammatical structure and have the main base of the root words and all the typical features of the Iranian languages. The existing materials also provide a sufficient basis to determine it as belonging to the northwestern Iranian group of languages. That language had no written tradition. According to Zelinsky, dozens of villages had spoken the language before, but it was just understandable to the villagers afterwards and then the Azerbaijani language replaced it.
