= Hameh Ja =

Village in Alborz province, Iran

Hameh Ja همه جا
- Village
- Location within Iran
- Coordinates: 36°01′55″N 51°16′18″E
- Country: Iran
- Province: Alborz
- County: Karaj
- District: Asara
- Rural District: Asara

Population (2016)
  - Total: 385
- Time zone: UTC+3:30 (IRST)

Hameh Ja (Persian: همه جا) (Note: Also romanized as Hameh Jā) is a village in Asara Rural District of Asara District in Karaj County, Alborz province, Iran.

== Demographics ==
=== Population ===
At the time of the 2006 National Census, the village's population was 335 in 107 households, when it was in Tehran province. The 2016 census measured the population of the village as 385 people in 130 households, by which time the county had been separated from the province in the establishment of Alborz province.
