= Talysh alphabet =

The Talysh alphabet (Talysh: Tolışə əlifba, Tolyšə əlifba) was created for the Talysh language in 1930 by Talysh poet Zolfaghar Ahmadzadeh based on Latin script. Before that, alphabets based on Cyrillic and Arabic scripts were widely used.

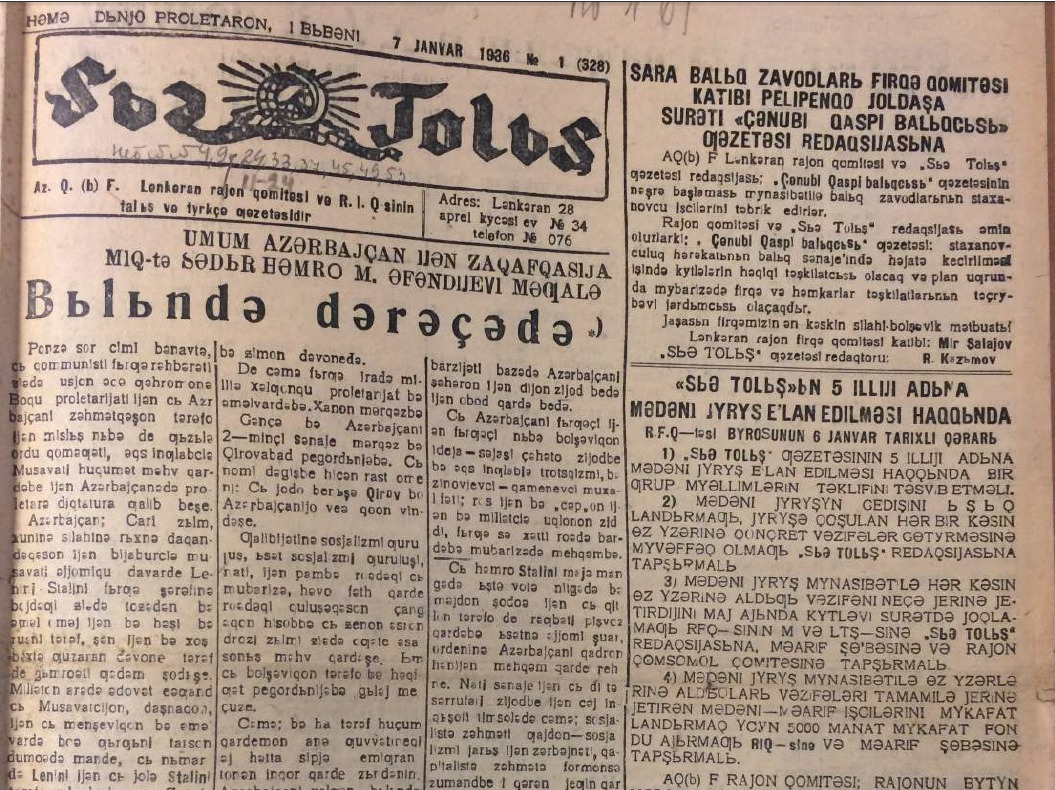
"Sıə Tolış" newspaper (1937).

There are two competing orthographies. The first alphabet, used in Azerbaijan, is based on the Azerbaijani alphabet and indicates 29 consonant and vowel sounds by 29 letters. The second is used by the Talysh Wikipedia, and does not distinguish [u] and [ʏ].

Talysh alphabet
IPA value	Azerbaijan variant	Wikipedia variant
[ɑ]	A a	A a
[b]	B b	B b
[dʒ]	C c	Č č
[tʃ]	Ç ç	C c
[d]	D d	D d
[e]	E e	E e
[a]~[æ]	Ə ə	Ə ə
[f]	F f	F f
[ɣ]	Ğ ğ	Ǧ ǧ
[h]	H h	H h
[x]	X x	X x
[ə]~[ɨ]	I ı	Y y
[i]~[ɪ]	İ i	I i
[ʒ]	J j	Ž ž
[k]	K k	K k
[ɡ]	Q q	G g
[l]	L l	L l
[m]	M m	M m
[n]	N n	N n
[o]~[ɔ]	O o	O o
[p]	P p	P p
[r]	R r	R r
[s]	S s	S s
[ʃ]	Ş ş	Š š
[t]	T t	T t
[u]	U u	U u
[ʏ]	Ü ü	U u
[v]	V v	V v
[j]	Y y	J j
[z]	Z z	Z z
