= Nesa Rural District =

Rural district in Alborz province, Iran

Nesa Rural District Persian: دهستان نساء
- Rural District
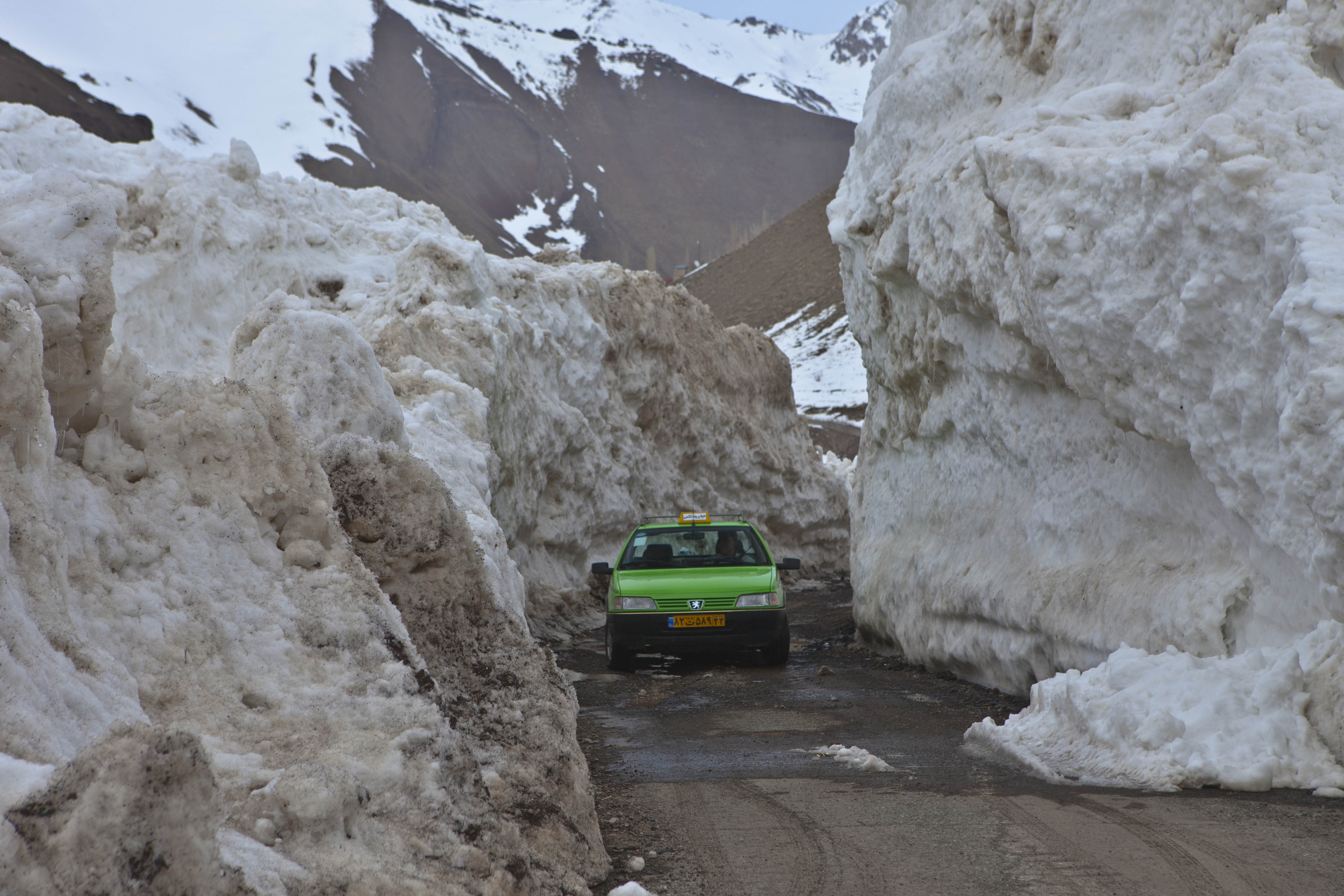
- Avalanche in Nesa Rural District, March 2011

- Location within Iran
- Coordinates: 36°06′N 51°22′E
- Country: Iran
- Province: Alborz
- County: Karaj
- District: Asara
- Established: 1993
- Capital: Nesa

Population (2016)
  - Total: 5,069
- Time zone: UTC+3:30 (IRST)

Nesa Rural District (Persian: دهستان نساء) is in Asara District of Karaj County, Alborz province, Iran. Its capital is the village of Nesa.

== Demographics ==
=== Population ===
At the time of the 2006 National Census, the rural district's population (as a part of Tehran province) was 6,081 in 1,617 households. The 2016 census measured the population of the rural district as 1,681 households, by which time the county had been separated from the province in the establishment of Alborz province. The most populous of its 18 villages was Velayat Rud, with 1,382 people.

=== Other villages in the rural district ===
- Asiab Dargah
- Azadbar
- Emam Cheshmeh
- Gach Sar
- Garmab
- Gashnadar
- Gasil
- Hasan Kedar
- Kohneh Deh
- Kushkak
- Malek Faliz
- Meydanak
- Sorkheh Darreh
- Valeh
- Varangeh Rud
