= Qatlish-e Sofla =

Qatlish-e Sofla قتليش سفلي
- Village
- Location within Iran
- Coordinates: 37°48′50″N 57°17′50″E
- Country: Iran
- Province: North Khorasan
- County: Bojnord
- Bakhsh: Garmkhan
- Rural District: Gifan

Population (2006)
  - Total: 428
- Time zone: UTC+3:30 (IRST)
  - Summer (DST): UTC+4:30 (IRDT)

Qatlish-e Sofla (Persian: قتليش سفلي, also romanized as Qatlīsh-e Soflá; also known as Kātlīsh and Qatlīsh is a village in Gifan Rural District, Garmkhan District, Bojnord County, North Khorasan Province, Iran. At the 2006 census, its population was 428, in 97 families.
