= Asiab Dargah =

Village in Alborz province, Iran

Asiab Dargah Persian: آسياب‌درگاه
- Village
- Location within Iran
- Country: Iran
- Province: Alborz
- County: Karaj
- District: Asara
- Rural District: Nesa

Population (2016)
  - Total: 100
- Time zone: UTC+3:30 (IRST)

Asiab Dargah (Persian: آسياب‌درگاه) (Note: Also romanized as Āsīāb Dargāh) is a village in Nesa Rural District of Asara District in Karaj County, Alborz province, Iran.

== Demographics ==
=== Population ===
At the time of the 2006 National Census, the village's population was 108 in 29 households, when it was in Tehran province. The 2016 census measured the population of the village as 100 people in 30 households, by which time the county had been separated from the province in the establishment of Alborz province.
