= Karangan, East Azerbaijan =

Karangan كرنگان
- Village
- Location within Iran
- Coordinates: 38°45′08″N 46°31′28″E
- Country: Iran
- Province: East Azerbaijan
- County: Varzaqan
- Bakhsh: Central
- Rural District: Sina

Population (2006)
  - Total: 129
- Time zone: UTC+3:30 (IRST)
  - Summer (DST): UTC+4:30 (IRDT)

Karangan (Persian: كرنگان, also Romanized as Karangān, Karanagān, and Kerengān; also known as Karanīgān, Karankan, Karingan, Kerenkān, and Kyurengyan) is a village in Sina Rural District, in the Central District of Varzaqan County, East Azerbaijan Province, Iran. At the 2006 census, its population was 129, in 27 families. People of Karangan are Tat and they speak Tati language (Karingani). Tati is old language of Azerbaijan (Old Azeri).
