= Pir Boz =

Village in North Khorasan province, Iran

Pir Boz Persian: پيربز
- Village
- Location within Iran
- Coordinates: 37°52′27″N 57°13′15″E
- Country: Iran
- Province: North Khorasan
- County: Bojnord
- District: Garmkhan
- Rural District: Gifan

Population (2016)
  - Total: 734
- Time zone: UTC+3:30 (IRST)

Pir Boz (Persian: پيربز) (Note: Also romanized as Pīr Boz) is a village in Gifan Rural District of Garmkhan District in Bojnord County, North Khorasan province, Iran.

== Demographics ==
=== Population ===
At the time of the 2006 National Census, the village's population was 1,032 in 220 households. The following census in 2011 counted 792 people in 204 households. The 2016 census measured the population of the village as 734 people in 199 households.
