= Qeshlaq-e Naveh =

Village in North Khorasan province, Iran

Qeshlaq-e Naveh Persian: قشلاق ناوه
- Village
- Location within Iran
- Coordinates: 37°46′22″N 57°23′33″E
- Country: Iran
- Province: North Khorasan
- County: Bojnord
- District: Garmkhan
- Rural District: Gifan

Population (2016)
  - Total: 504
- Time zone: UTC+3:30 (IRST)

Qeshlaq-e Naveh (Persian: قشلاق ناوه) (Note: Also romanized as Qeshlāq-e Nāveh; also known as Kalāteh-ye Shahīd (كلاته شهيد), Kalāteh-ye Shohadā-ye Nāveh, Qeshlag-e Naveh, and Shahīda Nāveh (شهدائ ناوه)) is a village in Gifan Rural District of Garmkhan District in Bojnord County, North Khorasan province, Iran.

== Demographics ==
=== Population ===
At the time of the 2006 National Census, the village's population was 605 in 125 households. The following census in 2011 counted 655 people in 164 households. The 2016 census measured the population of the village as 504 people in 124 households.
