= Izman-e Pain =

Village in North Khorasan province, Iran

Izman-e Pain Persian: ايزمان پائين
- Village
- Location within Iran
- Coordinates: 37°47′14″N 57°28′35″E
- Country: Iran
- Province: North Khorasan
- County: Bojnord
- District: Garmkhan
- Rural District: Gifan

Population (2016)
  - Total: 409
- Time zone: UTC+3:30 (IRST)

Izman-e Pa'in (Persian: ايزمان پائين) (Note: Also romanized as Īzmān-e Pā’īn; also known as Īzmān-e Soflá) is a village in Gifan Rural District of Garmkhan District in Bojnord County, North Khorasan province, Iran.

== Demographics ==
=== Population ===
At the time of the 2006 National Census, the village's population was 453 in 94 households. The following census in 2011 counted 380 people in 104 households. The 2016 census measured the population of the village as 409 people in 115 households.
