= Do Khanvari =

Village in Alborz province, Iran

Do Khanvari دوخانواري
- Village
- Location within Iran
- Country: Iran
- Province: Alborz
- County: Karaj
- District: Asara
- Rural District: Asara

Population (2016)
  - Total: 23
- Time zone: UTC+3:30 (IRST)

Do Khanvari (Persian: دوخانواري) (Note: Also romanized as Do Khānvārī) is a village in Asara Rural District of Asara District in Karaj County, Alborz province, Iran.

== Demographics ==
=== Population ===
At the time of the 2006 National Census, the village's population was 118 in 38 households, when it was in Tehran province. The 2016 census measured the population of the village as 23 people in 12 households, by which time the county had been separated from the province in the establishment of Alborz province.
