= Emam Cheshmeh =

Village in Alborz province, Iran

Emam Cheshmeh Persian: امام چشمه
- Village
- Location within Iran
- Coordinates: 36°06′33″N 51°19′09″E
- Country: Iran
- Province: Alborz
- County: Karaj
- District: Asara
- Rural District: Nesa

Population (2016)
  - Total: 159
- Time zone: UTC+3:30 (IRST)

Emam Cheshmeh (Persian: امام چشمه) (Note: Also romanized as Emām Cheshmeh) is a village in Nesa Rural District of Asara District in Karaj County, Alborz province, Iran.

== Demographics ==
=== Population ===
At the time of the 2006 National Census, the village's population was 185 in 51 households, when it was in Tehran province. The 2016 census measured the population of the village as 159 people in 49 households, by which time the county had been separated from the province in the establishment of Alborz province.
