= Asara Rural District =

Rural district in Alborz province, Iran

Asara Rural District Persian: دهستان آسارا
- Rural District
- Location within Iran
- Coordinates: 36°02′N 51°16′E
- Country: Iran
- Province: Alborz
- County: Karaj
- District: Asara
- Established: 1987
- Capital: Asara

Population (2016)
  - Total: 3,063
- Time zone: UTC+3:30 (IRST)

Asara Rural District (Persian: دهستان آسارا) is in Asara District of Karaj County, Alborz province, Iran. It is administered from the city of Asara.

== Demographics ==
=== Population ===
At the time of the 2006 National Census, the rural district's population (as a part of Tehran province) was 3,780 in 1,109 households. The 2016 census measured the population of the rural district as 3,063 people in 1,101 households, by which time the county had been separated from the province in the establishment of Alborz province. The most populous of its 11 villages was Shahrestanak, with 1,307 people.

=== Other villages in the rural district ===
- Dardeh
- Do Khanvari
- Hameh Ja
- Kiasar
- Kiasarlat
- Laniz
- Murud
- Sarak
- Shelnak
- Tekyeh-e Sepahsalar
