= Sarak, Alborz =

Village in Alborz province, Iran

Sarak سرک
- Village
- Location within Iran
- Coordinates: 35°59′38″N 51°18′31″E
- Country: Iran
- Province: Alborz
- County: Karaj
- District: Asara
- Rural District: Asara

Population (2016)
  - Total: 141
- Time zone: UTC+3:30 (IRST)

Sarak (Persian: سرک) is a village in Asara Rural District of Asara District in Karaj County, Alborz province, Iran.

== Demographics ==
=== Population ===
At the time of the 2006 National Census, the village's population was 292 in 86 households, when it was in Tehran province. The 2016 census measured the population of the village as 141 people in 46 households, by which time the county had been separated from the province in the establishment of Alborz province.
