= Kajali language =

Northwestern Iranian language

Kajali
- Native to: Iran
- Language family: Indo-European: Indo-Iranian; Iranian; Western; Northwestern; Adharic; Tatic; Central Tatic; Khalkhalic; Kajali
- Writing system: Arabic (Nastaliq)

Language codes
- ISO 639-3: xkj
- Glottolog: kaja1247
- ELP: Kajali

Kajali is a dialect of the Tati language spoken in the village of Kajal and a few surrounding villages around, in Ardabil province, northwestern Iran. It is a moribund Northwestern Iranian language closely related to Talysh. The language, which has a small number of remaining speakers, has been replaced by Azerbaijani. Unlike the Azeris, the dominant community in the region, its speakers are Sunni Muslims.

== Grammar ==
Similar to many other Tati dialects and closely related Zaza, the Kajali dialect has a grammatical gender system based on the distinction between masculine and feminine. The grammatical distinction between masculine and feminine is found in the conjugation of verbs as well as nouns. In addition to grammatical gender, there are two grammatical cases, nominative and oblique in the dialect.

Nominative and oblique endings:

	nom.	obl.
masc. sg.	-	-e
fem. sg.	-a	-e, -a
masc./fem. pl.	-e	-on
