= Hasanabad, Garmkhan =

Village in North Khorasan province, Iran

Hasanabad Persian: حسن اباد
- Village
- Location within Iran
- Coordinates: 37°53′34″N 57°39′38″E
- Country: Iran
- Province: North Khorasan
- County: Bojnord
- District: Garmkhan
- Rural District: Gifan

Population (2016)
  - Total: 472
- Time zone: UTC+3:30 (IRST)

Hasanabad (Persian: حسن اباد) (Note: Also romanized as Ḩasanābād) is a village in Gifan Rural District of Garmkhan District in Bojnord County, North Khorasan province, Iran.

== Demographics ==
=== Population ===
At the time of the 2006 National Census, the village's population was 606 in 136 households. The following census in 2011 counted 600 people in 164 households. The 2016 census measured the population of the village as 472 people in 139 households.
