= Kohneh Deh, Alborz =

Village in Alborz province, Iran

Kohneh Deh Persian: كهنه ده
- Village
- Location within Iran
- Coordinates: 36°06′51″N 51°16′35″E
- Country: Iran
- Province: Alborz
- County: Karaj
- District: Asara
- Rural District: Nesa

Population (2016)
  - Total: 168
- Time zone: UTC+3:30 (IRST)

Kohneh Deh (Persian: كهنه ده) is a village in Nesa Rural District of Asara District in Karaj County, Alborz province, Iran.

== Demographics ==
=== Population ===
At the time of the 2006 National Census, the village's population was 131 in 37 households, when it was in Tehran province. The 2016 census measured the population of the village as 168 people in 56 households, by which time the county had been separated from the province in the establishment of Alborz province.
