= Azadbar =

Village in Alborz province, Iran

Azadbar Persian: ازادبر
- Village
- Location within Iran
- Coordinates: 36°08′42″N 51°15′23″E
- Country: Iran
- Province: Alborz
- County: Karaj
- District: Asara
- Rural District: Nesa

Population (2016)
  - Total: 211
- Time zone: UTC+3:30 (IRST)

Azadbar (Persian: ازادبر) (Note: Also romanized as Āzādbar) is a village in Nesa Rural District of Asara District in Karaj County, Alborz province, Iran.

== Demographics ==
=== Population ===
At the time of the 2006 National Census, the village's population was 577 in 138 households, when it was in Tehran province. The 2016 census measured the population of the village as 211 people in 66 households, by which time the county had been separated from the province in the establishment of Alborz province.
