= Malek Faliz =

Village in Alborz province, Iran

Malek Faliz Persian: ملك فاليز
- Village
- Location within Iran
- Coordinates: 36°04′42″N 51°18′57″E
- Country: Iran
- Province: Alborz
- County: Karaj
- District: Asara
- Rural District: Nesa

Population (2016)
  - Total: 432
- Time zone: UTC+3:30 (IRST)

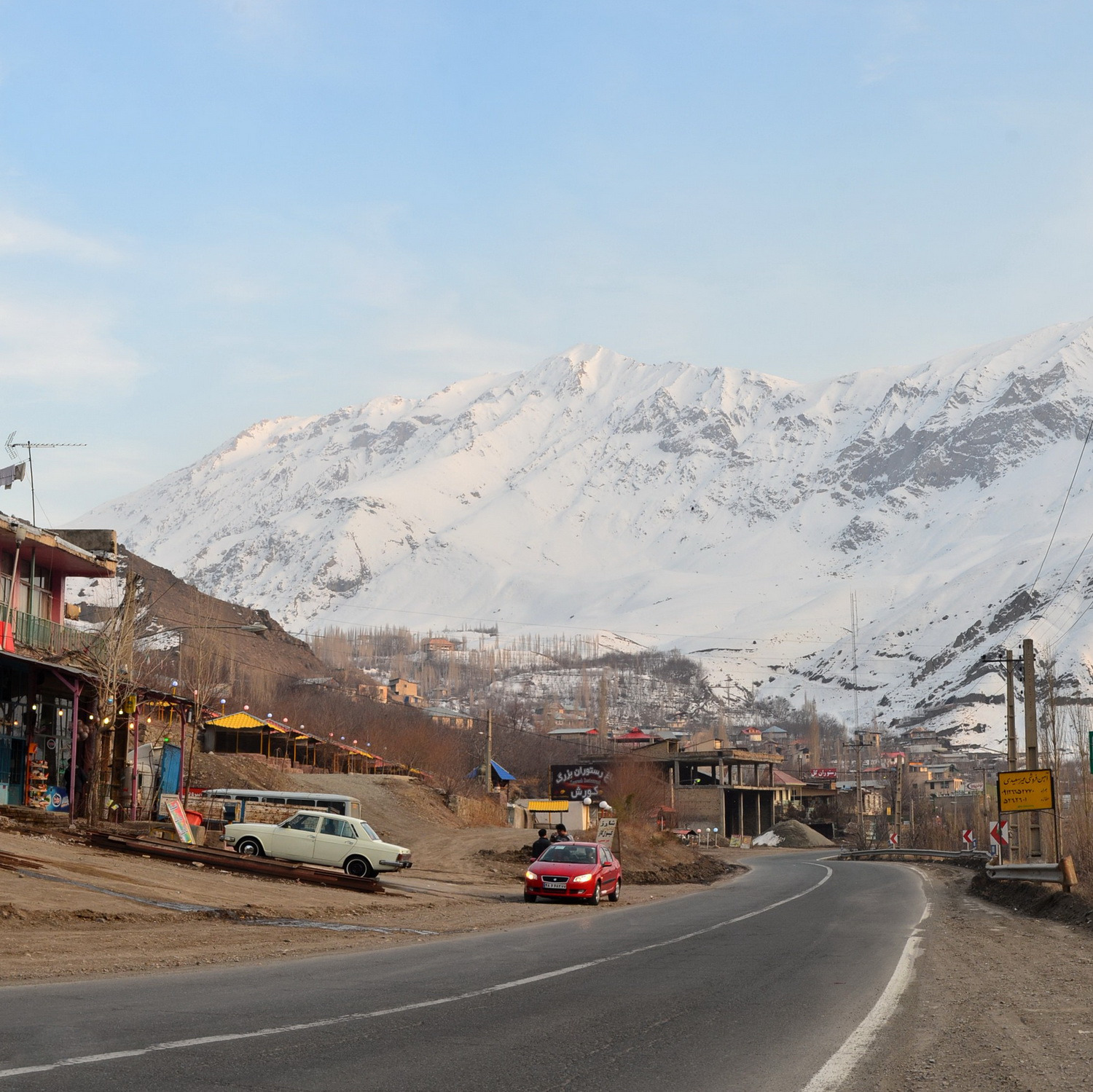
Panoramic photo of Malek Faliz

Malek Faliz (Persian: ملك فاليز) (Note: Also romanized as Malek Fālīz; also known as Malek Vālīz and Malik Waliz) is a village in Nesa Rural District of Asara District in Karaj County, Alborz province, Iran.

== Demographics ==
=== Population ===
At the time of the 2006 National Census, the village's population was 139 in 39 households, when it was in Tehran province. The 2016 census measured the population of the village as 432 people in 141 households, by which time the county had been separated from the province in the establishment of Alborz province.
