= Garmab, Alborz =

Village in Alborz province, Iran

Garmab Persian: گرماب
- Village
- Location within Iran
- Coordinates: 36°02′38″N 51°18′39″E
- Country: Iran
- Province: Alborz
- County: Karaj
- District: Asara
- Rural District: Nesa

Population (2016)
  - Total: 45
- Time zone: UTC+3:30 (IRST)

Garmab (Persian: گرماب) (Note: Also romanized as Garmāb) is a village in Nesa Rural District of Asara District in Karaj County, Alborz province, Iran.

== Demographics ==
=== Population ===
At the time of the 2006 National Census, the village's population was 210 in 60 households, when it was in Tehran province. The 2016 census measured the population of the village as 45 people in 21 households, by which time the county had been separated from the province in the establishment of Alborz province.
