= Valeh, Alborz =

Village in Alborz province, Iran

Valeh Persian: وله
- Village
- Location within Iran
- Coordinates: 36°06′44″N 51°19′09″E
- Country: Iran
- Province: Alborz
- County: Karaj
- District: Asara
- Rural District: Nesa

Population (2016)
  - Total: 300
- Time zone: UTC+3:30 (IRST)

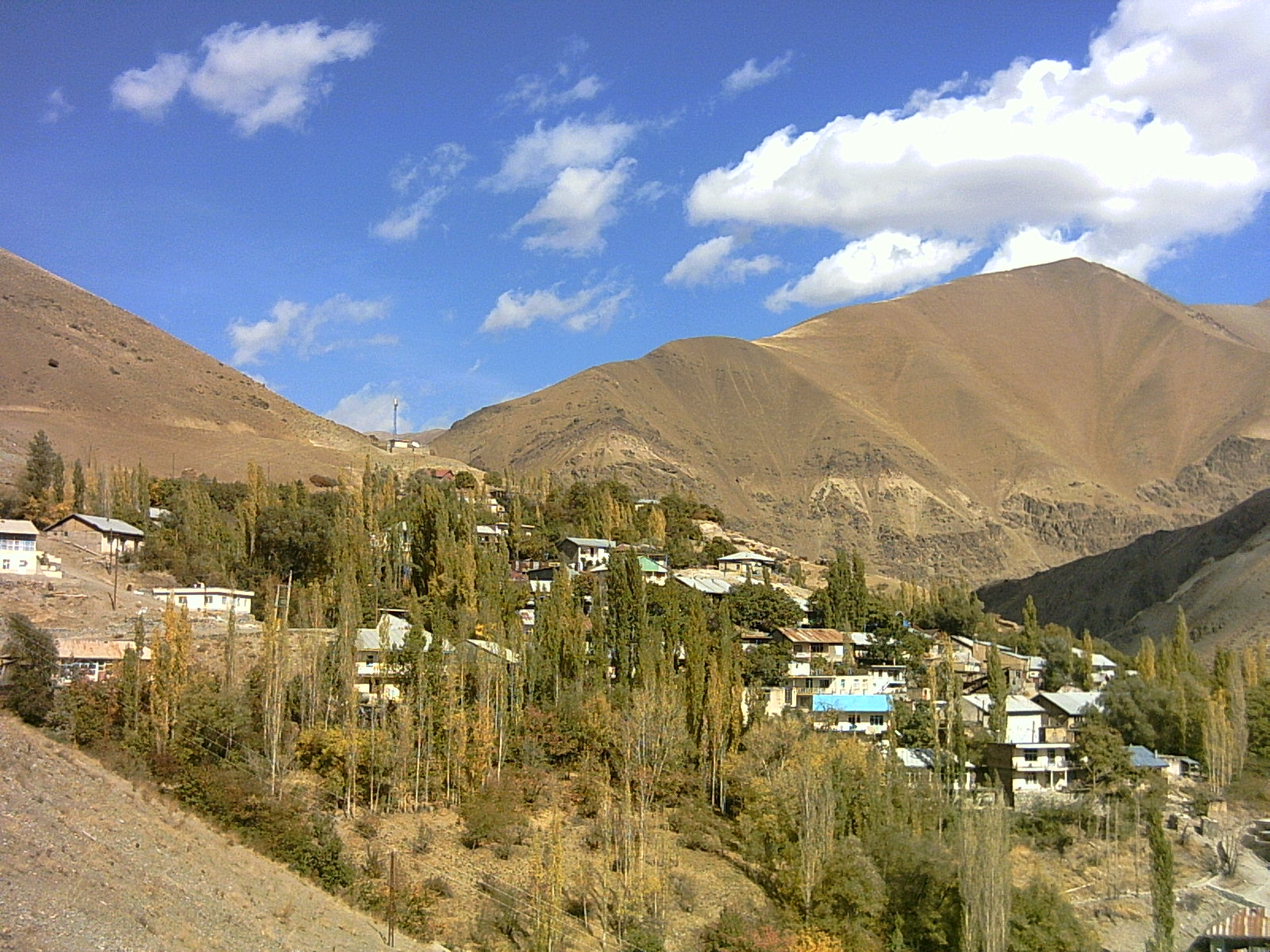
Karaj Chalus road 5

Valeh (Persian: وله) is a village in Nesa Rural District of Asara District in Karaj County, Alborz province, Iran.

== Demographics ==
=== Population ===
At the time of the 2006 National Census, the village's population was 302 in 78 households, when it was in Tehran province. The 2016 census measured the population of the village as 300 people in 98 households, by which time the county had been separated from the province in the establishment of Alborz province.
