= Tajiks (disambiguation) =

Tajiks are a Persian-speaking Iranian ethnic group native to Central Asia.

Tajiks may also refer to:

- Tajiks of Xinjiang, a minority in China who speak different Pamir languages
- Tajik (word), a historic term used for ethnic Iranians in general
- Pamiri people, speakers of Pamir languages
