= Atanak =

Atanak اتانك
- Village
- Location within Iran
- Coordinates: 36°08′14″N 50°28′39″E
- Country: Iran
- Province: Qazvin
- County: Abyek
- Bakhsh: Central
- Rural District: Kuhpayeh-e Sharqi

Population (2006)
  - Total: 115
- Time zone: UTC+3:30 (IRST)
  - Summer (DST): UTC+4:30 (IRDT)

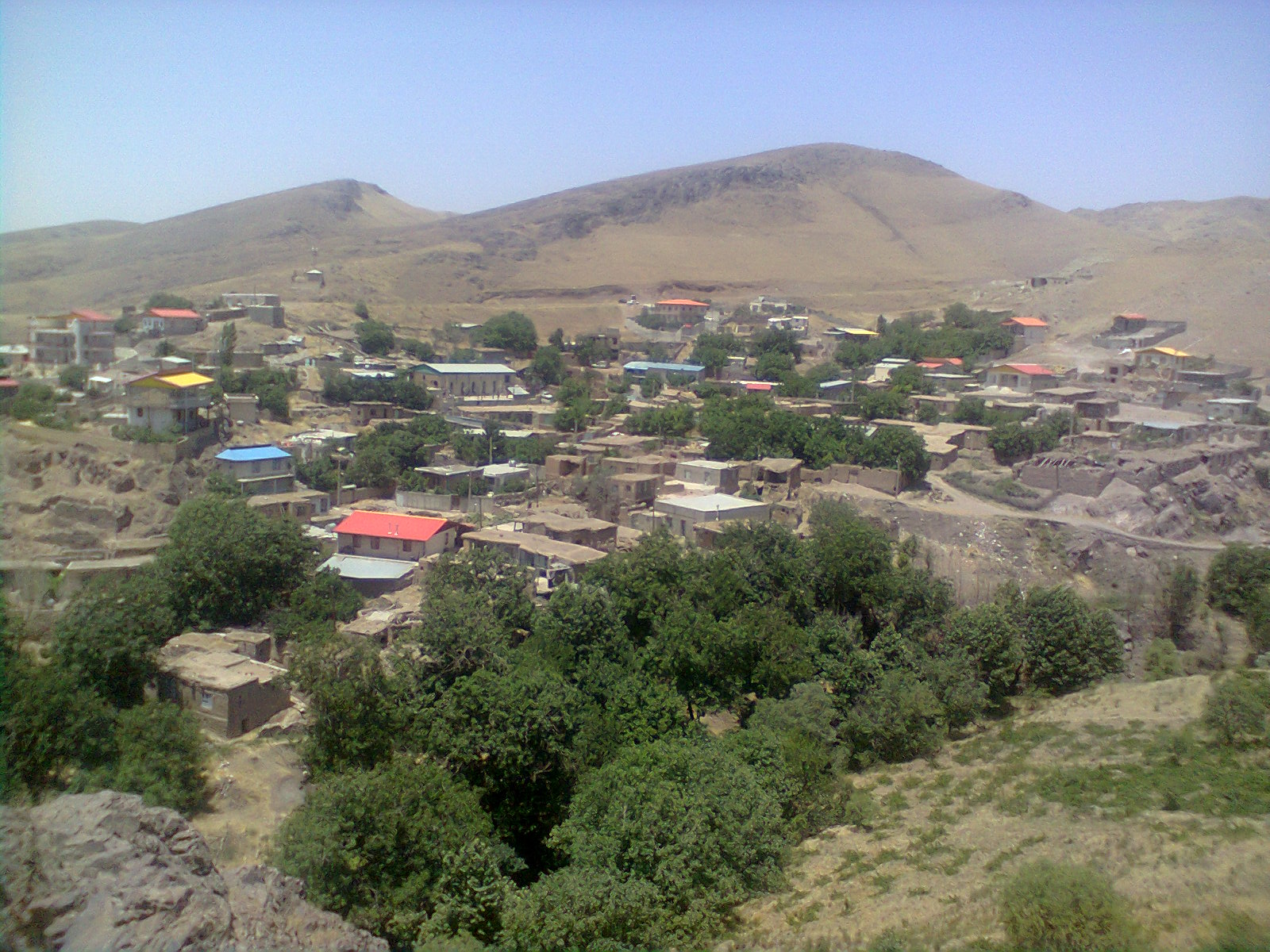
View of the village of Atanak

Atanak (Persian: اتانك, also Romanized as Ātānak) is a village in Kuhpayeh-e Sharqi Rural District, in the Central District of Abyek County, Qazvin Province, Iran. At the 2006 census, its population was 115, in 36 families.
