= Maraghei dialect =

Tati dialect of Iran

Maraghei
- مراغى پگڠەرۉب
- Native to: Iran
- Language family: Indo-European: Indo-Iranian; Iranian; Western; Northwestern; Adharic; Tatic; Central Tatic; Maraghei

Language codes
- ISO 639-3: vmh
- Glottolog: mara1373
- ELP: Maraghei

Maraghei (Tati: مراغی، مراقی) is a dialect of the Tati language, spoken in the Gilan Province, and upper Rudbar area (Rudbar-e Alamut). The Maraghei Tati is closely related to Talysh and Gozarkhani, and falls under the Central Tatic (spoken in the Qazvin Province) subgroup. One dialect spoken is Dikini, there are also various other dialects.
