= Zereshk =

Zereshk زرشك
- Village
- Location within Iran
- Coordinates: 36°25′34″N 50°06′05″E
- Country: Iran
- Province: Qazvin
- County: Qazvin
- Bakhsh: Central
- Rural District: Iqbal-e Gharbi

Population (2006)
  - Total: 190
- Time zone: UTC+3:30 (IRST)
  - Summer (DST): UTC+4:30 (IRDT)

Zereshk (Persian: زرشك, also Romanized as Zereshg and Zirishk) is a village in Eqbal-e Gharbi Rural District, in the Central District of Qazvin County, Qazvin province, Iran. At the 2006 census, its population was 190, in 53 families.
