= Razajerdi language =

Northwestern Iranian language of Iran

Razajerdi
- Native to: Iran
- Language family: Indo-European: Indo-Iranian; Iranian; Western; Northwestern; Adharic; Tatic; Southern Tatic; Ramand-Karaj; Razajerdi

Language codes
- ISO 639-3: rat
- Glottolog: raza1238
- ELP: Razajerdi

Razajerdi is a moribund Northwestern Iranian language and is a dialect of the Tati language of Iran. It is closely related to the Eshtehardi and Takestani dialects.
