= Kazlak =

Kazlak كذلك
- Village
- Location within Iran
- Coordinates: 36°10′42″N 50°30′48″E
- Country: Iran
- Province: Qazvin
- County: Abyek
- Bakhsh: Central
- Rural District: Kuhpayeh-e Sharqi

Population (2006)
  - Total: 97
- Time zone: UTC+3:30 (IRST)
  - Summer (DST): UTC+4:30 (IRDT)

Kazlak (Persian: كذلك, also Romanized as Kaz̄lak; also known as Gaznak) is a village in Kuhpayeh-e Sharqi Rural District, in the Central District of Abyek County, Qazvin Province, Iran. At the 2006 census, its population was 97, in 27 families.
