= Kiasar, Alborz =

Village in Alborz province, Iran

Kiasar كياسر
- Village
- Location within Iran
- Coordinates: 36°02′44″N 51°13′43″E
- Country: Iran
- Province: Alborz
- County: Karaj
- District: Asara
- Rural District: Asara

Population (2016)
  - Total: 236
- Time zone: UTC+3:30 (IRST)

Kiasar (Persian: كياسر) (Note: Also romanized as Kīāsar) is a village in Asara Rural District of Asara District in Karaj County, Alborz province, Iran.

== Demographics ==
=== Population ===
At the time of the 2006 National Census, the village's population was 87 in 31 households, when it was in Tehran province. The 2016 census measured the population of the village as 236 people in 82 households, by which time the county had been separated from the province in the establishment of Alborz province.
