= Daral Sarvar =

Darossorur دارُالسُّرور
- Village
- Location within Iran
- Coordinates: 36°06′09″N 50°27′33″E
- Country: Iran
- Province: Qazvin
- County: Abyek
- Bakhsh: Central
- Rural District: Kuhpayeh-e Sharqi

Population (2006)
  - Total: 169
- Time zone: UTC+3:30 (IRST)
  - Summer (DST): UTC+4:30 (IRDT)

Daral Sarvar (Persian: دارالسرور, also Romanized as Dārāl Sarvar; also known as Dārā Sarvar and Dār os Sarvar) is a village in Kuhpayeh-e Sharqi Rural District, in the Central District of Abyek County, Qazvin Province, Iran. At the 2006 census, its population was 169, in 45 families.
