= Nesa, Alborz =

Village in Alborz province, Iran

Nesa Persian: نسا
- Village
- Location within Iran
- Coordinates: 36°04′37″N 51°19′13″E
- Country: Iran
- Province: Alborz
- County: Karaj
- District: Asara
- Rural District: Nesa

Population (2016)
  - Total: 862
- Time zone: UTC+3:30 (IRST)

Nesa (Persian: نسا) (Note: Also romanized as Nesā’; also known as Nesā’ Pā‘īn and Nesā’-e Pā‘īn) is a village in, and the capital of, Nesa Rural District in Asara District of Karaj County, Alborz province, Iran.

== Demographics ==
=== Population ===
At the time of the 2006 National Census, the village's population was 857 in 204 households, when it was in Tehran province. The 2016 census measured the population of the village as 862 people in 291 households, by which time the county had been separated from the province in the establishment of Alborz province.
