= Meydanak, Alborz =

Village in Alborz province, Iran

Meydanak Persian: ميدانك
- Village
- Location within Iran
- Coordinates: 36°02′12″N 51°18′45″E
- Country: Iran
- Province: Alborz
- County: Karaj
- District: Asara
- Rural District: Nesa

Population (2016)
  - Total: 28
- Time zone: UTC+3:30 (IRST)

Meydanak (Persian: ميدانك) (Note: Also romanized as Maidanak and Meydānak) is a village in Nesa Rural District of Asara District in Karaj County, Alborz province, Iran.

== Demographics ==
=== Population ===
At the time of the 2006 National Census, the village's population was 20 in seven households, when it was in Tehran province. The 2016 census measured the population of the village as 28 people in 10 households, by which time the county had been separated from the province in the establishment of Alborz province.
