= Tekyeh-e Sepahsalar =

Village in Alborz province, Iran

Tekyeh-e Sepahsalar تكيه سپهسالار
- Village
- Location within Iran
- Coordinates: 36°03′17″N 51°12′22″E
- Country: Iran
- Province: Alborz
- County: Karaj
- District: Asara
- Rural District: Asara

Population (2016)
  - Total: 344
- Time zone: UTC+3:30 (IRST)

Tekyeh-e Sepahsalar (Persian: تكيه سپهسالار) (Note: Also romanized as Takyeh-e Sepahsālār and Tekye-ye Sepahsālār) is a village in Asara Rural District of Asara District in Karaj County, Alborz province, Iran.

== Demographics ==
=== Population ===
At the time of the 2006 National Census, the village's population was 349 in 106 households, when it was in Tehran province. The 2016 census measured the population of the village as 344 people in 117 households, by which time the county had been separated from the province in the establishment of Alborz province.
