= Shelnak =

Village in Alborz province, Iran

Shelnak شلنك
- Village
- Location within Iran
- Coordinates: 35°59′57″N 51°19′29″E
- Country: Iran
- Province: Alborz
- County: Karaj
- District: Asara
- Rural District: Asara

Population (2016)
  - Total: 82
- Time zone: UTC+3:30 (IRST)

Shelnak (Persian: شلنك) (Note: Also romanized as Shalanak) is a village in Asara Rural District of Asara District in Karaj County, Alborz province, Iran.

== Demographics ==
=== Population ===
At the time of the 2006 National Census, the village's population was 121 in 41 households, when it was in Tehran province. The 2016 census measured the population of the village as 82 people in 31 households, by which time the county had been separated from the province in the establishment of Alborz province.
