= Hasan Kedar =

Village in Alborz province, Iran

Hasanakdar Persian: حسنكدر(روستای امامزاده حسن)
- Village
- Location within Iran
- Coordinates: 36°04′08″N 51°18′27″E
- Country: Iran
- Province: Alborz
- County: Karaj
- District: Asara
- Rural District: Nesa

Population (2016)
  - Total: 592
- Time zone: UTC+3:30 (IRST)

Hasanakdar (Persian: حسنكدر (روستای امامزاده حسن)) (Note: Also romanized as Hasanak Darand Ḩasanak Dar) is a village in Nesa Rural District of Asara District in Karaj County, Alborz province, Iran.

== Demographics ==
=== Population ===
At the time of the 2006 National Census, the village's population was 875 in 224 households, when it was in Tehran province. The village population had decreased to 592 people in 198 households at the 2016 census, by which time the county had been separated from the province in the establishment of Alborz province.
