= Gashnadar =

Village in Alborz province, Iran

Gashnadar Persian: گشنادر
- Village
- Location within Iran
- Coordinates: 36°01′47″N 51°21′27″E
- Country: Iran
- Province: Alborz
- County: Karaj
- District: Asara
- Rural District: Nesa

Population (2016)
  - Total: 20
- Time zone: UTC+3:30 (IRST)

Gashnadar (Persian: گشنادر) (Note: Also romanized as Gashnādar) is a village in Nesa Rural District of Asara District in Karaj County, Alborz province, Iran.

== Demographics ==
=== Population ===
At the time of the 2006 National Census, the village's population was 94 in 33 households, when it was in Tehran province. The 2016 census measured the population of the village as 20 people in eight households, by which time the county had been separated from the province in the establishment of Alborz province.
