= Kahvan =

Kahvan كهوان
- Village
- Location within Iran
- Coordinates: 36°10′50″N 50°29′42″E
- Country: Iran
- Province: Qazvin
- County: Abyek
- Bakhsh: Central
- Rural District: Kuhpayeh-e Sharqi

Population (2006)
  - Total: 76
- Time zone: UTC+3:30 (IRST)
  - Summer (DST): UTC+4:30 (IRDT)

Kahvan (Persian: كهوان, also Romanized as Kahvān) is a village in Kuhpayeh-e Sharqi Rural District, in the Central District of Abyek County, Qazvin Province, Iran. At the 2006 census, its population was 76, in 34 families.
