= Tudaran =

Tudaran توداران
- Village
- Location within Iran
- Coordinates: 36°10′58″N 50°29′15″E
- Country: Iran
- Province: Qazvin
- County: Abyek
- Bakhsh: Central
- Rural District: Kuhpayeh-e Sharqi

Population (2006)
  - Total: 150
- Time zone: UTC+3:30 (IRST)
  - Summer (DST): UTC+4:30 (IRDT)

Tudaran (Persian: توداران, also Romanized as Tūdārān) is a village in Kuhpayeh-e Sharqi Rural District, in the Central District of Abyek County, Qazvin Province, Iran. At the 2006 census, its population was 150, in 54 families.
