= Kalasur =

Kalasur كلاسور
- Village
- Location within Iran
- Coordinates: 38°48′33″N 46°45′09″E
- Country: Iran
- Province: East Azerbaijan
- County: Kaleybar
- Bakhsh: Central
- Rural District: Misheh Pareh

Population (2006)
  - Total: 108
- Time zone: UTC+3:30 (IRST)
  - Summer (DST): UTC+4:30 (IRDT)

Kalasur (Persian: كلاسور, also Romanized as Kalāsūr, Kalasoor, and Kelāsūr; also known as Keyālīsūr, Kialiasur, and Kyalyasur) is a village in Misheh Pareh Rural District, in the Central District of Kaleybar County, East Azerbaijan Province, Iran. At the 2006 census, its population was 108, in 22 families.

The Tati dialect of Kalasuri is spoken in the village.
