= Voshteh, Qazvin =

Voshteh وشته
- Village
- Location within Iran
- Coordinates: 36°29′29″N 50°20′20″E
- Country: Iran
- Province: Qazvin
- County: Qazvin
- Bakhsh: Alamut-e Gharbi
- Rural District: Rudbar-e Mohammad-e Zamani

Population (2006)
  - Total: 386
- Time zone: UTC+3:30 (IRST)
  - Summer (DST): UTC+4:30 (IRDT)

Voshteh (Persian: وشته, also Romanized as Veshteh) is a village in Rudbar-e Mohammad-e Zamani Rural District, Alamut-e Gharbi District, Qazvin County, Qazvin Province, Iran. At the 2006 census, its population was 386, in 129 families.
