= Qaleh-ye Mohammadi =

Village in North Khorasan province, Iran

Qaleh-ye Mohammadi Persian: قلعه محمدي
- Village
- Location within Iran
- Coordinates: 37°53′18″N 57°33′08″E
- Country: Iran
- Province: North Khorasan
- County: Bojnord
- District: Garmkhan
- Rural District: Gifan

Population (2016)
  - Total: 441
- Time zone: UTC+3:30 (IRST)

Qaleh-ye Mohammadi (Persian: قلعه محمدي) (Note: Also romanized as Qal‘eh-ye Moḩammadī; also known as Owghāzeh (اوغازه)) is a village in Gifan Rural District of Garmkhan District in Bojnord County, North Khorasan province, Iran.

== Demographics ==
=== Population ===
At the time of the 2006 National Census, the village's population was 665 in 125 households. The following census in 2011 counted 489 people in 138 households. The 2016 census measured the population of the village as 441 people in 141 households.
