= Shahrudi language =

Northwestern Iranian language

Shahrudi
- Native to: Iran
- Language family: Indo-European: Indo-Iranian; Iranian; Western; Northwestern; Adharic; Tatic; Central Tatic; Khalkhalic; Shahrudi
- Writing system: Arabic script (Nastaliq)

Language codes
- ISO 639-3: shm
- Glottolog: shah1254

Shahrudi is a Tatic dialect and moribund Northwestern Iranian language closely related to Talysh.
