= Gasil =

Village in Alborz province, Iran

Gasil Persian: گسيل
- Village
- Location within Iran
- Coordinates: 36°01′42″N 51°19′45″E
- Country: Iran
- Province: Alborz
- County: Karaj
- District: Asara
- Rural District: Nesa

Population (2016)
  - Total: 43
- Time zone: UTC+3:30 (IRST)

Gasil (Persian: گسيل) (Note: Also romanized as Gasīl; also known as Kasil, also romanized as Kasīl) is a village in Nesa Rural District of Asara District in Karaj County, Alborz province, Iran.

== Demographics ==
=== Population ===
At the time of the 2006 National Census, the village's population was 188 in 59 households, when it was in Tehran province. The 2016 census measured the population of the village as 43 people in 22 households, by which time the county had been separated from the province in the establishment of Alborz province.
