= Qatlish-e Olya =

Village in North Khorasan province, Iran

Qatlish-e Olya Persian: قتليش عليا
- Village
- Location within Iran
- Coordinates: 37°48′39″N 57°18′40″E
- Country: Iran
- Province: North Khorasan
- County: Bojnord
- District: Garmkhan
- Rural District: Gifan

Population (2016)
  - Total: 470
- Time zone: UTC+3:30 (IRST)

Qatlish-ye Olya (Persian: قتليش عليا) (Note: Also romanized as Qatlīsh-ye ‘Olyā; also known as Kātlīsh and Qatlīsh) is a village in Gifan Rural District of Garmkhan District in Bojnord County, North Khorasan province, Iran.

== Demographics ==
=== Population ===
At the time of the 2006 National Census, the village's population was 419 in 104 households. The following census in 2011 counted 426 people in 126 households. The 2016 census measured the population of the village as 470 people in 146 households.
