= Gifan-e Pain =

Gifan-e Pain گيفان پائين
- Village
- Location within Iran
- Coordinates: 37°53′52″N 57°27′42″E
- Country: Iran
- Province: North Khorasan
- County: Bojnord
- Bakhsh: Garmkhan
- Rural District: Gifan

Population (2006)
  - Total: 286
- Time zone: UTC+3:30 (IRST)
  - Summer (DST): UTC+4:30 (IRDT)

Gifan-e Pain (Persian: گيفان پائين, also Romanized as Gīfān-e Pā’īn; also known as Pā’īndeh) is a village in Gifan Rural District, Garmkhan District, Bojnord County, North Khorasan Province, Iran. At the 2006 census, its population was 286, in 69 families.
