= Kiasarlat =

Village in Alborz province, Iran

Kiasarlat كياسرلات
- Village
- Location within Iran
- Country: Iran
- Province: Alborz
- County: Karaj
- District: Asara
- Rural District: Asara

Population (2016)
  - Total: 13
- Time zone: UTC+3:30 (IRST)

Kiasarlat (Persian: كياسرلات) (Note: Also romanized as Kīāsarlāt) is a village in Asara Rural District of Asara District in Karaj County, Alborz province, Iran.

== Demographics ==
=== Population ===
At the time of the 2006 National Census, the village's population was 28 in 12 households, when it was in Tehran province. The 2016 census measured the population of the village as 13 people in four households, by which time the county had been separated from the province in the establishment of Alborz province.
