= Varangeh Rud =

Village in Alborz province, Iran

Varangeh Rud Persian: وارنگه رود
- Village
- Location within Iran
- Coordinates: 36°07′12″N 51°21′50″E
- Country: Iran
- Province: Alborz
- County: Karaj
- District: Asara
- Rural District: Nesa

Population (2016)
  - Total: 257
- Time zone: UTC+3:30 (IRST)

Varangeh Rud (Persian: وارنگه رود) (Note: Also romanized as Vārangeh Rūd; also known as Vārang Rūd) is a village in Nesa Rural District of Asara District in Karaj County, Alborz province, Iran.

== Demographics ==
=== Population ===
At the time of the 2006 National Census, the village's population was 264 in 70 households, when it was in Tehran province. The 2016 census measured the population of the village as 257 people in 77 households, by which time the county had been separated from the province in the establishment of Alborz province.
