= Dardeh, Alborz =

Village in Alborz province, Iran

Dardeh درده
- Village
- Location within Iran
- Coordinates: 36°01′24″N 51°15′40″E
- Country: Iran
- Province: Alborz
- County: Karaj
- District: Asara
- Rural District: Asara

Population (2016)
  - Total: 184
- Time zone: UTC+3:30 (IRST)

Dardeh (Persian: درده) is a village in Asara Rural District of Asara District in Karaj County, Alborz province, Iran.

== Demographics ==
=== Population ===
At the time of the 2006 National Census, the village's population was 227 in 74 households, when it was in Tehran province. The 2016 census measured the population of the village as 184 people in 79 households, by which time the county had been separated from the province in the establishment of Alborz province.
