= Velayat Rud =

Village in Alborz province, Iran

Velayat Rud Persian: ولايترود
- Village
- Location within Iran
- Coordinates: 36°04′52″N 51°22′55″E
- Country: Iran
- Province: Alborz
- County: Karaj
- District: Asara
- Rural District: Nesa

Population (2016)
  - Total: 1,382
- Time zone: UTC+3:30 (IRST)

Velayat Rud (Persian: ولايترود) (Note: Also romanized as Velāyat Rūd; also known as Valātrūd) is a village in Nesa Rural District of Asara District in Karaj County, Alborz province, Iran.

== Demographics ==
=== Population ===
At the time of the 2006 National Census, the village's population was 1,649 in 454 households, when it was in Tehran province. The 2016 census measured the population of the village as 1,382 people in 458 households, by which time the county had been separated from the province in the establishment of Alborz province. It was the most populous village in its rural district.
