= Sorkheh Darreh =

Village in Alborz province, Iran

Sorkheh Darreh Persian: سرخه دره
- Village
- Location within Iran
- Country: Iran
- Province: Alborz
- County: Karaj
- District: Asara
- Rural District: Nesa

Population (2016)
  - Total: 183
- Time zone: UTC+3:30 (IRST)

Sorkheh Darreh (Persian: سرخه دره) (Note: Also known as Sorkhdar and Sorkheh Dar) is a village in Nesa Rural District of Asara District in Karaj County, Alborz province, Iran.

== Demographics ==
=== Population ===
At the time of the 2006 National Census, the village's population was 228 in 67 households, when it was in Tehran province. The 2016 census measured the population of the village as 183 people in 59 households, by which time the county had been separated from the province in the establishment of Alborz province.
