= Kilit, Ordubad =

Kilit
- Municipality
- Location within Azerbaijan
- Coordinates: 38°52′53″N 46°07′58″E
- Country: Azerbaijan
- Autonomous republic: Nakhchivan
- District: Ordubad
- Time zone: UTC+4 (AZT)

Kilit is a village and municipality in the Ordubad District of Nakhichevan, Azerbaijan. It is located in the left side of the Nakhichevan-Baku railway, 16 km in the south-east from the district center. At present, there is no population in the village.

It is the provenance and namesake of the Kilit language—one of several native Iranian languages of the Azerbaijani people, such as Old Azeri—until the eventual linguistic and cultural Turkification of the area.

== History ==
In the southeast of Kilit village, surrounded on all sides by steep slopes of the mountain and valleys, are karst caves with stalactites in their corridors and halls. The remains of the cultural layer which were found at the entrance of the caves show that the caves were ancient human settlements. Near Kilit, in the a place called Ul valley the ruins of the residence of the Middle Ages and grave monuments have been found.

In accordance of the decision of the Transcaucasian Central Executive Committee dated February 18, 1929, the village of Karchevan, together with nine other villages of the Nakhichevan ASSR, was ceded to the Armenian SSR. In addition, part of the territory of the Kilit village became part of Armenia in 1923.

== See also ==
- Kilit language - an extinct Iranian language
