= Gifan-e Bala =

Village in North Khorasan province, Iran

Gifan-e Bala Persian: گيفان بالا
- Village
- Location within Iran
- Coordinates: 37°53′41″N 57°28′56″E
- Country: Iran
- Province: North Khorasan
- County: Bojnord
- District: Garmkhan
- Rural District: Gifan

Population (2016)
  - Total: 518
- Time zone: UTC+3:30 (IRST)

Gifan-e Bala (Persian: گيفان بالا) (Note: Also romanized as Gīfān-e Bālā; also known as Bālādeh (بالاده) and Gīfān) is a village in, and the capital of, Gifan Rural District in Garmkhan District of Bojnord County, North Khorasan province, Iran.

== Demographics ==
=== Population ===
At the time of the 2006 National Census, the village's population was 575 in 174 households. The following census in 2011 counted 617 people in 192 households. The 2016 census measured the population of the village as 518 people in 167 households.
