= Murud, Iran =

Village in Alborz province, Iran

Murud مورود
- Village
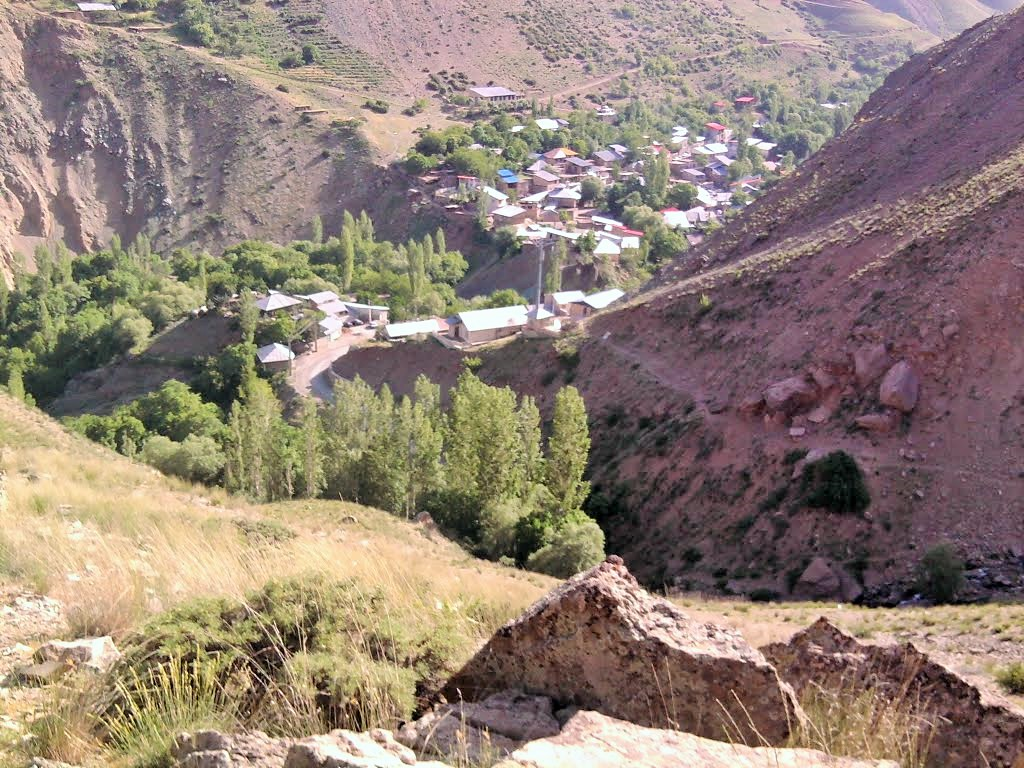

- Location within Iran
- Coordinates: 36°00′16″N 51°10′31″E
- Country: Iran
- Province: Alborz
- County: Karaj
- District: Asara
- Rural District: Asara

Population (2016)
  - Total: 258
- Time zone: UTC+3:30 (IRST)

Murud (Persian: مورود) (Note: Also romanized as Mūrūd) is a village in Asara Rural District of Asara District in Karaj County, Alborz province, Iran.

== Demographics ==
=== Population ===
At the time of the 2006 National Census, the village's population was 490 in 111 households, when it was in Tehran province. The 2016 census measured the population of the village as 258 people in 84 households, by which time the county had been separated from the province in the establishment of Alborz province.
