= Keshabad-e Olya =

Keshabad-e Olya كش ابادعليا
- Village
- Location within Iran
- Coordinates: 36°29′46″N 50°03′09″E
- Country: Iran
- Province: Qazvin
- County: Qazvin
- Bakhsh: Central
- Rural District: Eqbal-e Gharbi

Population (2006)
  - Total: 66
- Time zone: UTC+3:30 (IRST)
  - Summer (DST): UTC+4:30 (IRDT)

Keshabad-e Olya (Persian: كش ابادعليا, also Romanized as Keshābād-e ‘Olyā) is a village in Eqbal-e Gharbi Rural District, in the Central District of Qazvin County, Qazvin Province, Iran. At the 2006 census, its population was 66, in 25 families.
