= Karan language =

Northwestern Iranian language

Karan
- Koresh-e Rostam
- Native to: Iran
- Language family: Indo-European: Indo-Iranian; Iranian; Western; Northwestern; Adharic; Tatic; Khalkhalic; Karanic; Karan
- Dialects: Hezarrudi; Khoresh-e Rostam; Kelasi

Language codes
- ISO 639-3: okh
- Glottolog: kore1279

Karani, including the Koresh-e Rostam dialect, is a dialect of the Tati language. It is a moribund Northwestern Iranian language.
