= Khunirud =

Khunirud خونيرود
- Village
- Location within Iran
- Coordinates: 38°47′51″N 46°43′26″E
- Country: Iran
- Province: East Azerbaijan
- County: Kaleybar
- Bakhsh: Central
- Rural District: Misheh Pareh

Population (2006)
  - Total: 23
- Time zone: UTC+3:30 (IRST)
  - Summer (DST): UTC+4:30 (IRDT)

Khunirud (Persian: خونيرود, also Romanized as Khūnīrūd and Khavin Rood; also known as Khaynarev, Khoinarev, Khvoīnrūd, and Khvoy Nāreh) is a village in Misheh Pareh Rural District, in the Central District of Kaleybar County, East Azerbaijan Province, Iran. At the 2006 census, its population was 23, in 6 families.
