= Gifan Rural District =

Rural district in North Khorasan province, Iran

Gifan Rural District Persian: دهستان گيفان
- Rural District
- Location within Iran
- Coordinates: 37°50′N 57°25′E
- Country: Iran
- Province: North Khorasan
- County: Bojnord
- District: Garmkhan
- Established: 1987
- Capital: Gifan-e Bala

Population (2016)
  - Total: 8,658
- Time zone: UTC+3:30 (IRST)

Gifan Rural District (Persian: دهستان گيفان) is in Garmkhan District of Bojnord County, North Khorasan province, Iran. Its capital is the village of Gifan-e Bala.

== Demographics ==
=== Population ===
At the time of the 2006 National Census, the rural district's population was 10,439 in 2,386 households. There were 9,577 inhabitants in 2,567 households at the following census of 2011. The 2016 census measured the population of the rural district as 8,658 in 2,520 households. The most populous of its 22 villages was Shahrak-e Qaleh Juq-e Bozorg, with 1,341 people.

=== Other villages in the rural district ===
- Hasanabad
- Izman-e Bala
- Izman-e Pain
- Pir Boz
- Qaleh-ye Mohammadi
- Qatlish-e Olya
- Qeshlaq-e Naveh
