= Bahmanabad =

Bahmanabad or Behmanabad (Persian: بهمن اباد) may refer to:

== Places in Iran ==
- Bahmanabad, Chaharmahal and Bakhtiari
- Bahmanabad, East Azerbaijan
- Bahmanabad, Ilam
- Bahmanabad, Shahr-e Babak, Kerman Province
- Bahmanabad, Andika, Khuzestan Province
- Bahmanabad, Behbahan, Khuzestan Province
- Bahmanabad, Haftgel, Khuzestan Province
- Bahmanabad, Kurdistan
- Bahmanabad, Sabzevar, Razavi Khorasan Province
- Bahmanabad, Birjand, South Khorasan Province
- Bahmanabad, Zirkuh, South Khorasan Province
- Bahmanabad, Tehran

== Other places ==
- Bahmanabad, near Hyderabad, Pakistan, a candidate for the location of ancient Regio Patalis
