= Nomreh =

Nomreh (Persian: نمره) may refer to:

- Nomreh 1
- Nomreh 1-e Bala
- Nomreh 1-e Pain
- Nomreh 2, Haftgel
- Nomreh 2, Omidiyeh
- Nomreh 3
- Nomreh 5
- Nomreh 9, Ramhormoz
- Nomreh 11
- Nomreh 12
