= Sehatabad =

Village in Alborz province, Iran

Sehatabad Persian: صحتاباد
- Village
- Location within Iran
- Coordinates: 35°43′48″N 50°17′17″E
- Country: Iran
- Province: Alborz
- County: Eshtehard
- District: Central
- Rural District: Sehatabad

Population (2016)
  - Total: 993
- Time zone: UTC+3:30 (IRST)

Sehatabad (Persian: صحتاباد) (Note: Also romanized as Sehhatabad and Şeḩḩatābād; also known as Şoḩbatābād) is a village in, and the capital of, Sehatabad Rural District in the Central District of Eshtehard County, Alborz province, Iran.

== Demographics ==
=== Population ===
At the time of the 2006 National Census, the village's population was 719 in 183 households, when it was in Palangabad Rural District of the former Eshtehard District in Karaj County, Tehran province. In 2010, the county was separated from the province in the establishment of Alborz province. In 2012, the district was separated from the county in establishing Eshtehard County, and the rural district was transferred to the new Palangabad District. The village was transferred to Sehatabad Rural District created in the new Central District. The 2016 census measured the population of Sehatabad as 993 people in 289 households.
