= Qeshlaq-e Daylar =

Village in Alborz province, Iran

Qeshlaq-e Daylar Persian: قشلاق دايلر
- Village
- Location within Iran
- Coordinates: 35°47′47″N 50°18′45″E
- Country: Iran
- Province: Alborz
- County: Eshtehard
- District: Central
- Rural District: Sehatabad

Population (2016)
  - Total: 0
- Time zone: UTC+3:30 (IRST)

Qeshlaq-e Daylar (Persian: قشلاق دايلر) (Note: Also romanized as Qeshlāq-e Dāylar) is a village in Sehatabad Rural District of the Central District in Eshtehard County, Alborz province, Iran.

== Demographics ==
=== Population ===
At the time of the 2006 National Census, the village's population was 46 in eight households, when it was in Palangabad Rural District of the former Eshtehard District in Karaj County, Tehran province. In 2010, the county was separated from the province in the establishment of Alborz province. In 2012, the district was separated from the county in establishing Eshtehard County, and the rural district was transferred to the new Palangabad District. The village was transferred to Sehatabad Rural District created in the new Central District. The 2016 census measured the population of Qeshlaq-e Daylar as zero.
