= Qowzlu, Alborz =

Village in Alborz province, Iran

Qowzlu Persian: قوزلو
- Village
- Location within Iran
- Coordinates: 35°36′29″N 50°11′23″E
- Country: Iran
- Province: Alborz
- County: Eshtehard
- District: Central
- Rural District: Eypak

Population (2016)
  - Total: 68
- Time zone: UTC+3:30 (IRST)

Qowzlu (Persian: قوزلو) (Note: Also romanized as Qowzlū) is a village in Eypak Rural District of the Central District in Eshtehard County, Alborz province, Iran.

== Demographics ==
=== Population ===
At the time of the 2006 National Census, the village's population was 65 in 14 households, when it was in Palangabad Rural District of the former Eshtehard District in Karaj County, Tehran province. In 2010, the county was separated from the province in the establishment of Alborz province. In 2012, the district was separated from the county in establishing Eshtehard County, and the rural district was transferred to the new Palangabad District. The village was transferred to Eypak Rural District created in the new Central District. The 2016 census measured the population of Qowzlu as 68 in 21 households.
