= Eypak =

Village in Alborz province, Iran

Eypak Persian: ایپک
- Village
- Location within Iran
- Coordinates: 35°37′23″N 50°18′39″E
- Country: Iran
- Province: Alborz
- County: Eshtehard
- District: Central
- Rural District: Eypak

Population (2016)
  - Total: 781
- Time zone: UTC+3:30 (IRST)

Eypak (Persian: ایپک) (Note: Also romanized as Āypak; also known as Epīk and Īpak) is a village in, and the capital of, Eypak Rural District in the Central District of Eshtehard County, Alborz province, Iran.

== Demographics ==
=== Population ===
At the time of the 2006 National Census, the village's population was 652 in 165 households, when it was in Palangabad Rural District of the former Eshtehard District in Karaj County, Tehran province. In 2010, the county was separated from the province in the establishment of Alborz province. In 2012, the district was separated from the county in establishing Eshtehard County, and the rural district was transferred to the new Palangabad District. The village was transferred to Eypak Rural District created in the new Central District. The 2016 census measured the population of the village as 781 in 222 households. Eypak was the most populous village in its rural district.
