= Shajirat =

Village in Khuzestan province, Iran

Shajirat Persian: شجيرات
- Village
- Location within Iran
- Coordinates: 31°34′26″N 49°10′26″E
- Country: Iran
- Province: Khuzestan
- County: Haftkel
- District: Raghiveh
- Rural District: Raghiveh

Population (2016)
  - Total: 512
- Time zone: UTC+3:30 (IRST)

Shajirat (Persian: شجيرات) (Note: Also romanized as Shajeyrāt and Shajīrāt; also known as Shajarīyāt) is a village in Raghiveh Rural District of Raghiveh District, Haftkel County, Khuzestan province, Iran.

== Demographics ==
=== Population ===
At the time of the 2006 National Census, the village's population was 511 in 93 households, when it was in Gazin Rural District of the former Haftkel District of Ramhormoz County. The following census in 2011 counted 576 people in 128 households, by which time the district had been separated from the county in the establishment of Haftkel County. The rural district was transferred to the new Raghiveh District, and Shajirat was transferred to Raghiveh Rural District created in the district. The 2016 census measured the population of the village as 512 people in 122 households. It was the most populous village in its rural district.
