= Fardabad =

Village in Alborz, Iran

Fardabad Persian: فرداباد
- Village
- Location within Iran
- Coordinates: 35°43′27″N 50°29′52″E
- Country: Iran
- Province: Alborz
- County: Eshtehard
- District: Palangabad
- Rural District: Jaru

Population (2016)
  - Total: 274
- Time zone: UTC+3:30 (IRST)

Fardabad (Persian: فرداباد) (Note: Also romanized as Fardābād; also known as Pardābād) is a village in Jaru Rural District of Palangabad District in Eshtehard County, Alborz province, Iran.

== Demographics ==
=== Population ===
At the time of the 2006 National Census, the village's population was 239 in 60 households, when it was in Palangabad Rural District of the former Eshtehard District in Karaj County, Tehran province. In 2010, the county was separated from the province in the establishment of Alborz province. In 2012, the district was separated from the county in establishing Eshtehard County, and the rural district was transferred to the new Palangabad District. The village was transferred to Jaru Rural District created in the district. The 2016 census measured the population of Fardabad as 766 in 254 households.
