= Mehdiabad, Eshtehard =

Village in Alborz, Iran

Mehdiabad Persian: مهدي اباد
- Village
- Location within Iran
- Coordinates: 35°43′59″N 50°32′03″E
- Country: Iran
- Province: Alborz
- County: Eshtehard
- District: Palangabad
- Rural District: Jaru

Population (2016)
  - Total: 0
- Time zone: UTC+3:30 (IRST)

Mehdiabad (Persian: مهدي اباد) (Note: Also romanized as Mehdīābād; also known as Khorramābād, Khurramābād, and Matiābād) is a village in Jaru Rural District of Palangabad District in Eshtehard County, Alborz province, Iran.

== Demographics ==
=== Population ===
At the time of the 2006 National Census, the village's population was 22 in seven households, when it was in Palangabad Rural District of the former Eshtehard District in Karaj County, Tehran province. In 2010, the county was separated from the province in the establishment of Alborz province. In 2012, the district was separated from the county in establishing Eshtehard County. The rural district was transferred to the new Palangabad District, the village was transferred to Jaru Rural District created in the district. The 2016 census measured the population of Mehdiabad as zero.
