= Gondek =

Gondek may refer to:

== People with the surname ==
- Jyoti Gondek (born 1969), Canadian politician
- Kacper Gondek (1993–2018), Polish canoeist
- Leszek Gondek (1939–2013), Polish lawyer, historian and writer
- Waldemar Gondek (born 1953), Polish middle-distance runner

== Places ==
- Gondek-e Hasan, Iran
- Gondek-e Isa, Iran
- Gondek-e Seh, Iran

== See also ==
- Kondek
- Kondak (disambiguation)
