= Jaru, Iran =

Jaru (Persian: جارو), in Iran, may refer to:

- Jaru, Alborz
- Jaru, Khuzestan
- Jaru Rural District, in Alborz Province
