= Kal Khongak-e Bozorg =

Kal Khongak-e Bozorg كل خنگك بزرگ
- Village
- Location within Iran
- Coordinates: 31°41′48″N 49°19′38″E
- Country: Iran
- Province: Khuzestan
- County: Haftgel
- Bakhsh: Central
- Rural District: Howmeh

Population (2006)
  - Total: 89
- Time zone: UTC+3:30 (IRST)
  - Summer (DST): UTC+4:30 (IRDT)

Kal Khongak-e Bozorg (Persian: كل خنگك بزرگ; also known as Gel Khongak-e Bozorg, Gol Khongak, Gol Khongak-e Bozorg, and Kal Khongak-e Soflá) is a village in Howmeh Rural District in the Central District of Haftgel County, Khuzestan Province, Iran. At the 2006 census, its population was 89, in 17 families.
