= Dasht-e Denayik =

Dasht-e Denayik دشت دنايك
- Village
- Interactive map of Dasht-e Denayik
- Country: Iran
- Province: Khuzestan
- County: Haftgel
- Bakhsh: Central
- Rural District: Howmeh

Population (2006)
  - Total: 186
- Time zone: UTC+3:30 (IRST)
  - Summer (DST): UTC+4:30 (IRDT)

Dasht-e Denayik (Persian: دشت دنايك, also Romanized as Dasht-e Denāyīḵ) is a village in Howmeh Rural District, in the Central District of Haftgel County, Khuzestan Province, Iran. At the 2006 census, its population was 186, in 37 families.
