= Naft Sefid =

Village in Khuzestan province, Iran

Naft Sefid Persian: نفت سفيد
- Village
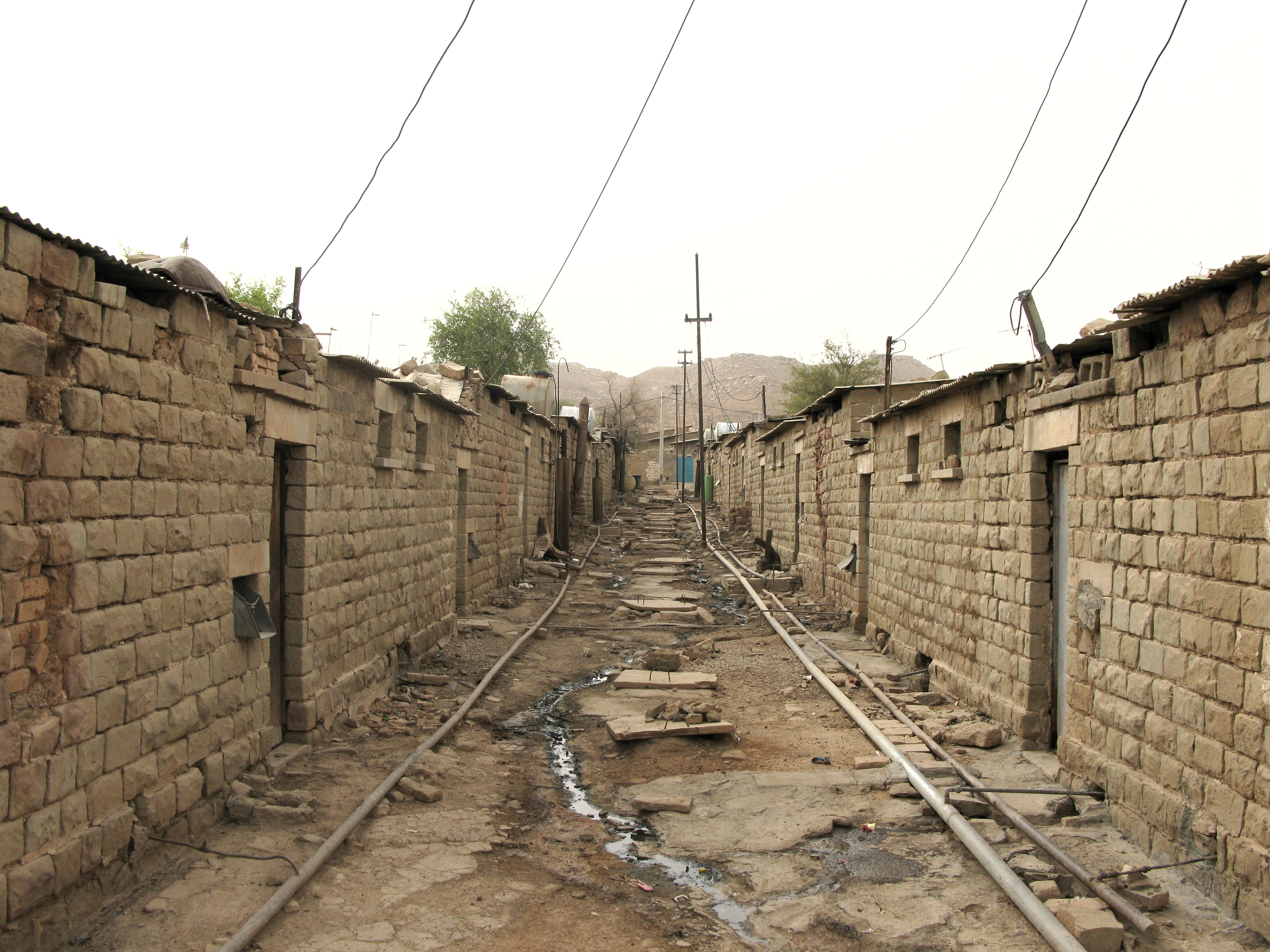

- Location within Iran
- Coordinates: 31°37′52″N 49°17′18″E
- Country: Iran
- Province: Khuzestan
- County: Haftkel
- District: Raghiveh
- Rural District: Gazin

Population (2016)
  - Total: 406
- Time zone: UTC+3:30 (IRST)

Naft Sefid (Persian: نفت سفيد) (Note: Also romanized as Naft Sefīd, Nafte-e Safĭd, and Naft-e Sefīd; also known as Naft Seqīd) is a village in Gazin Rural District of Raghiveh District, Haftkel County, Khuzestan province, Iran.

== Demographics ==
=== Population ===
At the time of the 2006 National Census, the village's population was 535 in 122 households, when it was in the former Haftkel District of Ramhormoz County. The following census in 2011 counted 476 people in 128 households, by which time the district had been separated from the county in the establishment of Haftkel County. The rural district was transferred to the new Raghiveh District. The 2016 census measured the population of the village as 406 people in 106 households. It was the most populous village in its rural district.
