= Deh-e Alireza, Khuzestan =

Deh-e Alireza ده عليرضا
- Village
- Country: Iran
- Province: Khuzestan
- County: Haftgel
- Bakhsh: Central
- Rural District: Howmeh

Population (2006)
  - Total: 142
- Time zone: UTC+3:30 (IRST)
  - Summer (DST): UTC+4:30 (IRDT)

Deh-e Alireza (Persian: ده عليرضا, also Romanized as Deh-e ʿAlīrez̤ā) is a village in Howmeh Rural District, in the Central District of Haftgel County, Khuzestan Province, Iran. At the 2006 census, its population was 142, in 25 families.
