= Shoheytat =

Shoheytat شحيطاط
- Village
- Location within Iran
- Coordinates: 31°28′59″N 49°15′39″E
- Country: Iran
- Province: Khuzestan
- Bakhsh: Raghiveh
- Rural District: Gazin

Population (2006)
  - Total: 57
- Time zone: UTC+3:30 (IRST)
  - Summer (DST): UTC+4:30 (IRDT)

Shoheytat (Persian: شحيطاط, also Romanized as Shoḩeyţāt; also known as Ro‘ayyed and Ru‘eyd) is a village in Gazin Rural District, Raghiveh District, Haftgel County, Khuzestan Province, Iran. At the 2006 census, its population was 57, in 11 families.
