= Saraj ol Din =

Saraj ol Din سراج الدين
- Village
- Location within Iran
- Coordinates: 31°28′42″N 49°21′45″E
- Country: Iran
- Province: Khuzestan
- County: Haftgel
- Bakhsh: Raghiveh
- Rural District: Gazin

Population (2006)
  - Total: 60
- Time zone: UTC+3:30 (IRST)
  - Summer (DST): UTC+4:30 (IRDT)

Saraj ol Din (Persian: سراج الدين, also Romanized as Sarāj od Dīn) is a village in Gazin Rural District, Raghiveh District, Haftgel County, Khuzestan Province, Iran.

== Population ==
At the 2006 census, its population was 60, in 8 families.
