= Sar Teyuk-e Olya =

Sar Teyuk سرتيوك
- Village
- Location within Iran
- Coordinates: 31°29′44″N 49°36′30″E
- Country: Iran
- Province: Khuzestan
- County: Haftgel
- Bakhsh: Central
- Rural District: Howmeh

Population (2006)
  - Total: 50
- Time zone: UTC+3:30 (IRST)
  - Summer (DST): UTC+4:30 (IRDT)

Sar Teyuk (Persian: سرتيوك, also Romanized as Sar Teyūk and Sarteyūk ; also known as Sar-i-Tīūk, Sarīūk, Sar Teyūk, and Sar Teyūk) is a village in Howmeh Rural District, in the Central District of Haftgel County, Khuzestan Province, Iran. At the 2006 census, its population was 50, in 12 families.
