= Si Mayeli-ye Gardbisheh =

Si Mayeli-ye Gardbisheh سي ميلي گردبيشه
- Village
- Location within Iran
- Coordinates: 31°40′44″N 49°23′09″E
- Country: Iran
- Province: Khuzestan
- County: Haftgel
- Bakhsh: Central
- Rural District: Howmeh

Population (2006)
  - Total: 116
- Time zone: UTC+3:30 (IRST)
  - Summer (DST): UTC+4:30 (IRDT)

Si Mayeli-ye Gardbisheh (Persian: سي ميلي گردبيشه, also Romanized as Sī Mayelī-e Gardbīsheh; also known as Gerd Bīsheh, Gird Bisheh, Sī Māyelī, and Sīmīlī) is a village in Howmeh Rural District, in the Central District of Haftgel County, Khuzestan Province, Iran. At the 2006 census, its population was 116, in 23 families.
