= Kaghazkonan =

Kaghazkonan (Persian: کاغذکنان) may refer to:

- Kaghazkonan District
- Kaghazkonan-e Markazi Rural District
- Kaghazkonan-e Shomali Rural District
