= Jafarabad, Alborz =

Village in Alborz province, Iran

Jafarabad Persian: جعفرآباد
- Village
- Location within Iran
- Coordinates: 35°43′09″N 50°43′14″E
- Country: Iran
- Province: Alborz
- County: Eshtehard
- District: Palangabad
- Rural District: Palangabad

Population (2016)
  - Total: 174
- Time zone: UTC+3:30 (IRST)

Jafarabad (Persian: جعفرآباد) (Note: also romanized as Ja‘farābād) is a village in Palangabad Rural District of Palangabad District in Eshtehard County, Alborz province, Iran.

== Demographics ==
=== Population ===
At the time of the 2006 National Census, the village's population was 70 in 22 households, when it was in the former Eshtehard District of Karaj County, Tehran province. In 2010, the county was separated from the province in the establishment of Alborz province. In 2012, the district was separated from the county in establishing Eshtehard County, and the rural district was transferred to the new Palangabad District. The 2016 census measured the population of the village as 174 in 58 households.
