= Naserabad, Alborz =

Village in Alborz province, Iran

Naserabad Persian: ناصراباد
- Village
- Location within Iran
- Country: Iran
- Province: Alborz
- County: Eshtehard
- District: Palangabad
- Rural District: Palangabad

Population (2016)
  - Total: Below reporting threshold
- Time zone: UTC+3:30 (IRST)

Naserabad (Persian: ناصراباد) (Note: Also romanized as Nāṣerābād; also known as Naz̧arābād) is a village in Palangabad Rural District of Palangabad District in Eshtehard County, Alborz province, Iran.

== Demographics ==
=== Population ===
At the time of the 2006 National Census, the village's population was 78 in 25 households, when it was in the former Eshtehard District of Karaj County, Tehran province. In 2010, the county was separated from the province in the establishment of Alborz province. In 2012, the district was separated from the county in establishing Eshtehard County, and the rural district was transferred to the new Palangabad District. The 2016 census measured the population of the village as below the reporting threshold.
