= Boneh-ye Khiraleh =

Boneh-ye Khiraleh بنه خيراله
- Village
- Country: Iran
- Province: Khuzestan
- County: Haftgel
- Bakhsh: Central
- Rural District: Howmeh

Population (2006)
  - Total: 33
- Time zone: UTC+3:30 (IRST)
  - Summer (DST): UTC+4:30 (IRDT)

Boneh-ye Khiraleh (Persian: بنه خيراله, also Romanized as Boneh-ye Khīrāleh) is a village in Howmeh Rural District, in the Central District of Haftgel County, Khuzestan Province, Iran. At the 2006 census, its population was 33, in 7 families.
