= Nobgan =

Nobgan نبگان
- Village
- Location within Iran
- Coordinates: 31°25′40″N 49°18′38″E
- Country: Iran
- Province: Khuzestan
- County: Haftgel
- Bakhsh: Raghiveh
- Rural District: Gazin

Population (2006)
  - Total: 55
- Time zone: UTC+3:30 (IRST)
  - Summer (DST): UTC+4:30 (IRDT)

Nobgan (Persian: نبگان, also Romanized as Nobgān and Nabgan; also known as Nobakān, Now Bagān, and Nowbegān) is a village in Gazin Rural District, Raghiveh District, Haftgel County, Khuzestan Province, Iran. At the 2006 census, its population was 55, in 8 families.
