= Dimeh Darb =

Dimeh Darb ديمه درب
- Village
- Location within Iran
- Coordinates: 31°37′08″N 49°29′48″E
- Country: Iran
- Province: Khuzestan
- County: Haftgel
- Bakhsh: Central
- Rural District: Howmeh

Population (2006)
  - Total: 67
- Time zone: UTC+3:30 (IRST)
  - Summer (DST): UTC+4:30 (IRDT)

Dimeh Darb (Persian: ديمه درب, also Romanized as Dīmeh Darb, Deymeh Darb, and Deymeh Derb; also known as Deyme Derb) is a village in Howmeh Rural District, in the Central District of Haftgel County, Khuzestan Province, Iran. At the 2006 census, its population was 67, in 19 families.
