= Mah Sonboli =

Mah Sonboli مه سنبلي
- Village
- Location within Iran
- Coordinates: 31°39′46″N 49°25′03″E
- Country: Iran
- Province: Khuzestan
- County: Haftkel
- Bakhsh: Central
- Rural District: Howmeh

Population (2006)
  - Total: 33
- Time zone: UTC+3:30 (IRST)
  - Summer (DST): UTC+4:30 (IRDT)

Mah Sonboli (Persian: مه سنبلي, also Romanized as Mah Sonbolī and Mahsonbolī; also known as Māsambūlī) is a village in Howmeh Rural District, in the Central District of Haftkel County, Khuzestan Province, Iran. At the 2006 census, its population was 33, in 9 families.
