= Barm-e Gavmishi-ye Seh =

Village in Khuzestan province, Iran

Barm-e Gavmishi-ye Seh Persian: برم گاوميشي سه
- Village
- Location within Iran
- Coordinates: 31°28′13″N 49°30′37″E
- Country: Iran
- Province: Khuzestan
- County: Haftkel
- District: Central
- Rural District: Howmeh

Population (2016)
  - Total: 857
- Time zone: UTC+3:30 (IRST)

Barm-e Gavmishi-ye Seh (Persian: برم گاوميشي سه) (Note: Also romanized as Barm-e Gāvmīshī-ye Seh; also known as Barm-e Gāvmīsh-e Bālā, Barm-e Gāvmīshī ‘Olyā, Barm-e Gāvmīshī-ye Bālā, and Barmgavmish) is a village in Howmeh Rural District (Note: Formerly Haftkel Rural District) of the Central District of Haftkel County, Khuzestan province, Iran.

== Demographics ==
=== Population ===
At the time of the 2006 National Census, the village's population was 1,126 in 226 households, when it was in Haftkel Rural District (Note: Renamed Howmeh Rural District) of the former Haftkel District of Ramhormoz County. The following census in 2011 counted 1,145 people in 269 households, by which time the district had been separated from the county in the establishment of Haftkel County. The rural district was transferred to the new Central District and renamed Howmeh Rural District. The 2016 census measured the population of the village as 857 people in 225 households. It was the most populous village in its rural district.
