= Deh-e Nowruz, Khuzestan =

Deh-e Nowruz ده نوروز
- Village
- Country: Iran
- Province: Khuzestan
- County: Haftgel
- Bakhsh: Central
- Rural District: Howmeh

Population (2006)
  - Total: 94
- Time zone: UTC+3:30 (IRST)
  - Summer (DST): UTC+4:30 (IRDT)

Deh-e Nowruz (Persian: ده نوروز, also Romanized as Deh-e Nowrūz) is a village in Howmeh Rural District, in the Central District of Haftgel County, Khuzestan Province, Iran. At the 2006 census, its population was 94, in 15 families.
