= Kahvarin =

Kahvarin كهورين
- Village
- Location within Iran
- Coordinates: 37°24′28″N 48°08′58″E
- Country: Iran
- Province: East Azerbaijan
- County: Meyaneh
- Bakhsh: Kaghazkonan
- Rural District: Kaghazkonan-e Shomali

Population (2006)
  - Total: 54
- Time zone: UTC+3:30 (IRST)
  - Summer (DST): UTC+4:30 (IRDT)

Kahvarin (Persian: كهورين, also Romanized as Kahvarīn) is a village in Kaghazkonan-e Shomali Rural District, Kaghazkonan District, Meyaneh County, East Azerbaijan Province, Iran. At the 2006 census, its population was 54, in 25 families.
