= Qusheh Bolagh =

Qusheh Bolagh (Persian: قوشه بلاغ) may refer to:

- Qusheh Bolagh, Kaleybar
- Qusheh Bolagh, Maragheh
- Qusheh Bolagh, Meyaneh
