= Gondek-e Seh =

Gondek-e Seh گندك سه
- Village
- Location within Iran
- Coordinates: 31°29′25″N 49°19′58″E
- Country: Iran
- Province: Khuzestan
- County: Haftgel
- Bakhsh: Raghiveh
- Rural District: Gazin

Population (2006)
  - Total: 153
- Time zone: UTC+3:30 (IRST)
  - Summer (DST): UTC+4:30 (IRDT)

Gondek-e Seh (Persian: گندك سه; also known as Kondek-e Seh) is a village in Gazin Rural District, Raghiveh District, Haftgel County, Khuzestan Province, Iran. At the 2006 census, its population was 153, in 25 families.
