= Andarud =

Andarud or Andrud or Andarood (Persian: اندرود) may refer to:

- Andarud-e Olya, East Azerbaijan Province
- Andarud-e Sofla, East Azerbaijan Province
- Andarud, Mazandaran
