= Farab, Iran =

Farab (Persian: فاراب) may refer to:

- Farab, Ardabil
- Farab, Markazi
- Qarab (disambiguation)
