= Soleymanlu, East Azerbaijan =

Soleymanlu سليمانلو
- Village
- Location within Iran
- Coordinates: 37°23′17″N 47°56′35″E
- Country: Iran
- Province: East Azerbaijan
- County: Meyaneh
- Bakhsh: Kaghazkonan
- Rural District: Qaflankuh-e Sharqi

Population (2006)
  - Total: 61
- Time zone: UTC+3:30 (IRST)
  - Summer (DST): UTC+4:30 (IRDT)

Soleymanlu (Persian: سليمانلو, also Romanized as Soleymānlū) is a village in Qaflankuh-e Sharqi Rural District, Kaghazkonan District, Meyaneh County, East Azerbaijan Province, Iran. At the 2006 census, its population was 61, in 23 families.
