= Qazilu =

Qazilu قاضيلو
- Village
- Location within Iran
- Coordinates: 37°13′52″N 47°57′14″E
- Country: Iran
- Province: East Azerbaijan
- County: Meyaneh
- Bakhsh: Kaghazkonan
- Rural District: Kaghazkonan-e Markazi

Population (2006)
  - Total: 98
- Time zone: UTC+3:30 (IRST)
  - Summer (DST): UTC+4:30 (IRDT)

Qazilu (Persian: قاضيلو, also Romanized as Qāẕīlū) is a village in Kaghazkonan-e Markazi Rural District, Kaghazkonan District, Meyaneh County, East Azerbaijan Province, Iran. At the 2006 census, its population was 98, in 28 families.
