= Badlu =

Badlu بادلو
- Village
- Location within Iran
- Coordinates: 37°21′13″N 47°53′36″E
- Country: Iran
- Province: East Azerbaijan
- County: Meyaneh
- Bakhsh: Kaghazkonan
- Rural District: Qaflankuh-e Sharqi

Population (2006)
  - Total: 68
- Time zone: UTC+3:30 (IRST)
  - Summer (DST): UTC+4:30 (IRDT)

Badlu (Persian: بادلو, also Romanized as Bādlū, Badlū Bādellū, and Bādelū) is a village in Qaflankuh-e Sharqi Rural District, Kaghazkonan District, Meyaneh County, East Azerbaijan Province, Iran. At the 2006 census, its population was 68, in 22 families.
