= Jaru =

Jaru may refer to:

== Places ==
=== Brazil ===
- Jaru, Rondônia

=== Iran ===
- Jaru, Alborz, a village in Eshtehard County, Alborz province
- Jaru, Khuzestan, a village in Haftkel County, Khuzestan province

== Languages ==
- Jaru or Djaru people, an indigenous Australian people
- Jaru or Djaru language, spoken in Australia by the Djaru people
- Jaru, spoken in Bolivia

== Other ==
- Jaru River, Brazil
