= Gurjiq =

Gurjiq گورجيق
- Village
- Location within Iran
- Coordinates: 37°24′39″N 48°05′29″E
- Country: Iran
- Province: East Azerbaijan
- County: Meyaneh
- Bakhsh: Kaghazkonan
- Rural District: Kaghazkonan-e Shomali

Population (2006)
  - Total: 115
- Time zone: UTC+3:30 (IRST)
  - Summer (DST): UTC+4:30 (IRDT)

Gurjiq (Persian: گورجيق, also Romanized as Gūrjīq; also known as Gurja, Gūrjaq, Gūzḩaq, Gyurdzha, and Kūrjaq) is a village in Kaghazkonan-e Shomali Rural District, Kaghazkonan District, Meyaneh County, East Azerbaijan Province, Iran. At the 2006 census, its population was 115, in 38 families.
