= Devich =

Devich دويچ
- Village
- Location within Iran
- Coordinates: 37°18′19″N 48°11′55″E
- Country: Iran
- Province: East Azerbaijan
- County: Meyaneh
- Bakhsh: Kaghazkonan
- Rural District: Kaghazkonan-e Markazi

Population (2006)
  - Total: 88
- Time zone: UTC+3:30 (IRST)
  - Summer (DST): UTC+4:30 (IRDT)

Devich (Persian: دويچ, also Romanized as Devīch and Dovīch; also known as Devīj, Duyuch, and Dyuyuch’) is a village in Kaghazkonan-e Markazi Rural District, Kaghazkonan District, Meyaneh County, East Azerbaijan Province, Iran. At the 2006 census, its population was 88, in 41 families.
