= Omm ol Safayeh =

Omm ol Safayeh (Persian: ام الصفايه) may refer to:

- Omm ol Safayeh 1
- Omm ol Safayeh 2
