= Qarah Hajjilu =

Qarah Hajjilu قره حاجيلو
- Village
- Location within Iran
- Coordinates: 37°18′19″N 47°56′18″E
- Country: Iran
- Province: East Azerbaijan
- County: Meyaneh
- Bakhsh: Kaghazkonan
- Rural District: Qaflankuh-e Sharqi

Population (2006)
  - Total: 100
- Time zone: UTC+3:30 (IRST)
  - Summer (DST): UTC+4:30 (IRDT)

Qarah Hajjilu (Persian: قره حاجيلو, also Romanized as Qarah Ḩājjīlū and Qareh Ḩājjīlū; also known as Qara Hāji, Qarah Ḩājīlū, and Qareh Ḩājjlū) is a village in Qaflankuh-e Sharqi Rural District, Kaghazkonan District, Meyaneh County, East Azerbaijan Province, Iran. At the 2006 census, its population was 100, in 26 families.
