= Abu Tabareh-ye Do =

Abu Tabareh-ye Do ابوطباره دو
- Village
- Country: Iran
- Province: Khuzestan
- County: Haftgel
- Bakhsh: Raghiveh
- Rural District: Gazin

Population (2006)
  - Total: 199
- Time zone: UTC+3:30 (IRST)
  - Summer (DST): UTC+4:30 (IRDT)

Abu Tabareh-ye Do (Persian: ابوطباره دو, also Romanized as Ābū Ţabāreh-ye Do) is a village in Gazin Rural District, Raghiveh District, Haftgel County, Khuzestan Province, Iran. At the 2006 census, its population was 199, in 37 families.
