= Jaru, Alborz =

Village in Alborz, Iran

Jaru Persian: جارو
- Village
- Location within Iran
- Coordinates: 35°41′30″N 50°32′17″E
- Country: Iran
- Province: Alborz
- County: Eshtehard
- District: Palangabad
- Rural District: Jaru

Population (2016)
  - Total: 766
- Time zone: UTC+3:30 (IRST)

Jaru (Persian: جارو) (Note: Also romanized as Jārū) is a village in, and the capital of, Jaru Rural District in Palangabad District of Eshtehard County, Alborz province, Iran.

== Demographics ==
=== Population ===
At the time of the 2006 National Census, the village's population was 602 in 156 households, when it was in Palangabad Rural District of the former Eshtehard District in Karaj County, Tehran province. In 2010, the county was separated from the province in the establishment of Alborz province. In 2012, the district was separated from the county in establishing Eshtehard County. The rural district was transferred to the new Palangabad District, and the village was transferred to Jaru Rural District created in the district. The 2016 census measured the population of the village as 766 in 254 households. Jaru was the most populous village in its rural district.
