= Ebadat =

Ebadat (Persian: عبادات) may refer to:

- Ebadat 1
- Ebadat 2
