= Baghbanan-e Olya =

Baghbanan-e Olya باغبانان عليا
- Village
- Location within Iran
- Coordinates: 37°26′26″N 48°09′18″E
- Country: Iran
- Province: East Azerbaijan
- County: Meyaneh
- Bakhsh: Kaghazkonan
- Rural District: Kaghazkonan-e Shomali

Population (2006)
  - Total: 52
- Time zone: UTC+3:30 (IRST)
  - Summer (DST): UTC+4:30 (IRDT)

Baghbanan-e Olya (Persian: باغبانان عليا, also Romanized as Bāghbānān-e ‘Olyā and Bāghbānān ‘Olyā; also known as Bāghbānān, Bāghbānān Bālā, Bāghbānān-e Bālā, Bagmanar, and Verkhnyaya Bagmanar) is a village in Kaghazkonan-e Shomali Rural District, Kaghazkonan District, Meyaneh County, East Azerbaijan Province, Iran. At the 2006 census, its population was 52, in 23 families.
