= Abu Tabareh =

Abu Tabareh (Persian: ابوطباره) may refer to:

- Abu Tabareh 1
- Abu Tabareh 2
