= Tokhtamishlu =

Tokhtamishlu تختميشلو
- Village
- Location within Iran
- Coordinates: 37°18′25″N 48°05′36″E
- Country: Iran
- Province: East Azerbaijan
- County: Meyaneh
- Bakhsh: Kaghazkonan
- Rural District: Kaghazkonan-e Shomali

Population (2006)
  - Total: 67
- Time zone: UTC+3:30 (IRST)
  - Summer (DST): UTC+4:30 (IRDT)

Tokhtamishlu (Persian: تختميشلو, also Romanized as Tokhtamīshlū; also known as Tokhtameshlū, Tokhtamoshlū, Tokhtamush, and Tūkhdāmesh) is a village in Kaghazkonan-e Shomali Rural District, Kaghazkonan District, Meyaneh County, East Azerbaijan Province, Iran. At the 2006 census, its population was 67, in 28 families.
