= Gazin, Khuzestan =

Village in Khuzestan province, Iran

Gazin Persian: گزين
- Village
- Location within Iran
- Coordinates: 31°33′26″N 49°23′10″E
- Country: Iran
- Province: Khuzestan
- County: Haftkel
- District: Raghiveh
- Rural District: Gazin

Population (2016)
  - Total: 251
- Time zone: UTC+3:30 (IRST)

Gazin (Persian: گزين) (Note: Also romanized as Gazīn; also known as Gūgerd) is a village in, and the capital of, Gazin Rural District of Raghiveh District, Haftkel County, Khuzestan province, Iran.

== Demographics ==
=== Population ===
At the time of the 2006 National Census, the village's population was 322 in 68 households, when it was in the former Haftkel District of Ramhormoz County. The following census in 2011 counted 325 people in 83 households, by which time the district had been separated from the county in the establishment of Haftkel County. The rural district was transferred to the new Raghiveh District. The 2016 census measured the population of the village as 251 people in 65 households.
