= Abu Alimeh =

Abu Alimeh or Abu Aleymeh or Abu Oleymeh (Persian: ابوعليمه) may refer to:

- Abu Alimeh, Haftgel
- Abu Oleymeh, Ramshir
