= Abu Tabareh-ye Yek =

Abu Tabareh-ye Yek ابوطباره يك
- Village
- Location within Iran
- Coordinates: 31°36′00″N 49°14′20″E
- Country: Iran
- Province: Khuzestan
- County: Haftgel
- Bakhsh: Raghiveh
- Rural District: Gazin

Population (2006)
  - Total: 149
- Time zone: UTC+3:30 (IRST)
  - Summer (DST): UTC+4:30 (IRDT)

Abu Tabareh-ye Yek (Persian: ابوطباره يك, also Romanized as Ābū Ţabāreh-ye Yek; also known as Abootabareh and Abū Tabāreh) is a village in Gazin Rural District, Raghiveh District, Haftgel County, Khuzestan Province, Iran. At the 2006 census, its population was 149, in 28 families.
