= Nomreh-ye Yek =

Nomreh-ye Yek نمره يك
- Village
- Location within Iran
- Coordinates: 31°26′03″N 49°25′54″E
- Country: Iran
- Province: Khuzestan
- County: Haftgel
- Bakhsh: Raghiveh
- Rural District: Gazin

Population (2006)
  - Total: 158
- Time zone: UTC+3:30 (IRST)
  - Summer (DST): UTC+4:30 (IRDT)

Nomreh-ye Yek (Persian: نمره يك, also Romanized as Nomreh Yek) is a village in Gazin Rural District, Raghiveh District, Haftgel County, Khuzestan Province, Iran. At the 2006 census, its population was 158, in 32 families.
