= Omm ol Safayeh-ye Yek =

Omm ol Safayeh-ye Yek ام الصفايه يك
- Village
- Country: Iran
- Province: Khuzestan
- County: Haftgel
- Bakhsh: Raghiveh
- Rural District: Gazin

Population (2006)
  - Total: 89
- Time zone: UTC+3:30 (IRST)
  - Summer (DST): UTC+4:30 (IRDT)

Omm ol Safayeh-ye Yek (Persian: ام الصفايه يك, also Romanized as Omm ol Şafāyeh-ye Yek) is a village in Gazin Rural District, Raghiveh District, Haftgel County, Khuzestan Province, Iran. At the 2006 census, its population was 89, in 17 families.
