= Baghjeghaz =

Baghjeghaz (Persian: باغچغاز), also rendered as Baghjehqaz or Baghchehqaz or Baghjehghaz may refer to:

- Baghjeghaz-e Olya
- Baghjeghaz-e Sofla
