= Omm ol Safayeh-ye Do =

Omm ol Safayeh-ye Do ام الصفايه دو
- Village
- Country: Iran
- Province: Khuzestan
- County: Haftgel
- Bakhsh: Raghiveh
- Rural District: Gazin

Population (2006)
  - Total: 64
- Time zone: UTC+3:30 (IRST)
  - Summer (DST): UTC+4:30 (IRDT)

Omm ol Safayeh-ye Do (Persian: ام الصفايه دو, also Romanized as Omm ol Şafāyeh-ye Do) is a village in Gazin Rural District, Raghiveh District, Haftgel County, Khuzestan Province, Iran. At the 2006 census, its population was 64, in 11 families.
