= Gondek-e Hasan =

Gondek-e Hasan گندك حسن
- Village
- Country: Iran
- Province: Khuzestan
- County: Haftgel
- Bakhsh: Raghiveh
- Rural District: Gazin

Population (2006)
  - Total: 280
- Time zone: UTC+3:30 (IRST)
  - Summer (DST): UTC+4:30 (IRDT)

Gondek-e Hasan (Persian: گندك حسن, also Romanized as Gondek-e Ḩasan) is a village in Gazin Rural District, Raghiveh District, Haftgel County, Khuzestan Province, Iran. At the 2006 census, its population was 280, in 55 families.
