= Nomreh-ye Davazdah =

Nomreh-ye Davazdah نمره دوازده
- Village
- Location within Iran
- Coordinates: 31°39′58″N 49°14′42″E
- Country: Iran
- Province: Khuzestan
- County: Haftgel
- Bakhsh: Raghiveh
- Rural District: Gazin

Population (2006)
  - Total: 52
- Time zone: UTC+3:30 (IRST)
  - Summer (DST): UTC+4:30 (IRDT)

Nomreh-ye Davazdah (Persian: نمره دوازده, also Romanized as Nomreh-ye Davāzdah) is a village in Gazin Rural District, Raghiveh District, Haftgel County, Khuzestan Province, Iran. At the 2006 census, its population was 52, in 9 families.
