= Kundak =

Kundak (Persian: كوندك) may refer to:

- Gondek-e Isa, Iran
- Kondek-e Khanjar, Iran
