= Kondak =

Kondak may refer to:

- Kondak, Iran, a village in Khuzestan Province, Iran
- Kondak-e Saraydin, a village in Khuzestan Province, Iran
- Kondak, Armenian term for pastoral letter

== See also ==
- Kondakar, Slavonic variant of Greek kontakarion, book containing kontakion-type Eastern Orthodox hymns
- Kondek
- Gondek (disambiguation)
