= Konjin, Iran =

Konjin
- Village
- Location within Iran
- Coordinates: 37°21′57″N 48°06′40″E
- Country: Iran
- Province: East Azerbaijan
- County: Meyaneh
- Bakhsh: Kaghazkonan
- Rural District: Kaghazkonan-e Shomali

Population (2006)
  - Total: 105
- Time zone: UTC+3:30 (IRST)
  - Summer (DST): UTC+4:30 (IRDT)

Konjin (Persian: گنجین, also Romanize as Konjīn, Kundzhun, and Kunjun) is a village in Kaghazkonan-e Shomali Rural District, Kaghazkonan District, Meyaneh County, East Azerbaijan Province, Iran. At the 2006 census, its population was 105, in 30 families.
