= Shah Ali Beyglu =

Shah Ali Beyglu شاه علي بيگلو
- Village
- Location within Iran
- Coordinates: 37°20′35″N 48°09′29″E
- Country: Iran
- Province: East Azerbaijan
- County: Meyaneh
- Bakhsh: Kaghazkonan
- Rural District: Kaghazkonan-e Shomali

Population (2006)
  - Total: 65
- Time zone: UTC+3:30 (IRST)
  - Summer (DST): UTC+4:30 (IRDT)

Shah Ali Beyglu (Persian: شاه علي بيگلو, also Romanized as Shāh ‘Alī Beyglū; also known as Shalveli) is a village in Kaghazkonan-e Shomali Rural District, Kaghazkonan District, Meyaneh County, East Azerbaijan Province, Iran. At the 2006 census, its population was 65, in 29 families.
