= Sehatabad Rural District =

Rural district in Alborz province, Iran

Sehatabad Rural District Persian: دهستان صحت‌آباد
- Rural District
- Location within Iran
- Coordinates: 35°45′N 50°21′E
- Country: Iran
- Province: Alborz
- County: Eshtehard
- District: Central
- Established: 2012
- Capital: Sehatabad

Population (2016)
  - Total: 3,403
- Time zone: UTC+3:30 (IRST)

Sehatabad Rural District (Persian: دهستان صحت‌آباد) is in the Central District of Eshtehard County, Alborz province, Iran. Its capital is the village of Sehatabad.

== History ==
In 2010, Karaj County was separated from Tehran province in the establishment of Alborz province.

In 2012, Eshtehard District was separated from the county in establishing Eshtehard County, and Sehatabad Rural District was created in the new Central District.

== Demographics ==
=== Population ===
At the time of the 2016 National Census, the rural district's population was 3,403 in 1,035 households. The most populous of its 42 villages was Eshtehard Industrial Town (شهرک صنعتي اشتهارد), with 1,217 people.

=== Other villages in the rural district ===
- Morad Tappeh
- Nekujar
- Qeshlaq-e Daylar
