= Qarah Torpaq =

Village in Alborz province, Iran

Qarah Torpaq Persian: قره ترپاق
- Village
- Location within Iran
- Coordinates: 35°36′22″N 50°21′52″E
- Country: Iran
- Province: Alborz
- County: Eshtehard
- District: Central
- Rural District: Eypak

Population (2016)
  - Total: 744
- Time zone: UTC+3:30 (IRST)

Qarah Torpaq (Persian: قره ترپاق) (Note: Also romanized as Qarah Torpāq; also known as Qarah Tūprāq, Qarāturbāq, Qareh Toprāq, and Qareh Towprāq) is a village in Eypak Rural District of the Central District in Eshtehard County, Alborz province, Iran.

== Demographics ==
=== Population ===
At the time of the 2006 National Census, the village's population was 508 in 114 households, when it was in Akhtarabad Rural District of the Central District in Malard County, Tehran province. In 2010, Karaj, Nazarabad, and Savojbolagh Counties were separated from the province in the establishment of Alborz province. In 2012, the village was separated from Malard County in establishing Eshtehard County and transferred to Eypak Rural District created in the new Central District. The 2016 census measured the population of Qarah Torpaq as 744 in 209 households.
