= Ebadat-e Do =

Ebadat-e Do عبادات دو
- Village
- Location within Iran
- Coordinates: 31°32′45″N 49°11′16″E
- Country: Iran
- Province: Khuzestan
- County: Haftgel
- Bakhsh: Raghiveh
- Rural District: Gazin

Population (2006)
  - Total: 116
- Time zone: UTC+3:30 (IRST)
  - Summer (DST): UTC+4:30 (IRDT)

Ebadat-e Do (Persian: عبادات دو, also Romanized as ‘Ebādāt-e Do) is a village in Gazin Rural District, Raghiveh District, Haftgel County, Khuzestan Province, Iran. At the 2006 census, its population was 116, in 18 families.
