= Abu Alimeh, Haftkel =

Abu Alimeh ابوعليمه
- Village
- Location within Iran
- Coordinates: 31°27′31″N 49°17′09″E
- Country: Iran
- Province: Khuzestan
- County: Haftgel
- Bakhsh: Raghiveh
- Rural District: Gazin

Population (2006)
  - Total: 207
- Time zone: UTC+3:30 (IRST)
  - Summer (DST): UTC+4:30 (IRDT)

Abu Alimeh (Persian: ابوعليمه, also Romanized as Abū ‘Alīmeh and Abū ‘Aleymeh) is a village in Gazin Rural District, Raghiveh District, Haftgel County, Khuzestan Province, Iran. At the 2006 census, its population was 207, in 41 families.
