= Aydamir =

Aydamir ايدمير
- Village
- Location within Iran
- Coordinates: 37°14′46″N 47°54′55″E
- Country: Iran
- Province: East Azerbaijan
- County: Meyaneh
- Bakhsh: Kaghazkonan
- Rural District: Qaflankuh-e Sharqi

Population (2024)
  - Total: 5
- Time zone: UTC+3:30 (IRST)
  - Summer (DST): UTC+4:30 (IRDT)

Aydamir (Persian: ايدمير, also Romanized as Āydamīr) is a village in Qaflankuh-e Sharqi Rural District, Kaghazkonan District, Meyaneh County, East Azerbaijan Province, Iran. At the 2024 census, its population was 5, in 2 families.
