= Soleyman Qeshlaq =

Soleyman Qeshlaq سليمان قشلاق
- Village
- Location within Iran
- Coordinates: 37°14′25″N 48°01′34″E
- Country: Iran
- Province: East Azerbaijan
- County: Meyaneh
- Bakhsh: Kaghazkonan
- Rural District: Kaghazkonan-e Markazi

Population (2006)
  - Total: 30
- Time zone: UTC+3:30 (IRST)
  - Summer (DST): UTC+4:30 (IRDT)

Soleyman Qeshlaq (Persian: سليمان قشلاق, also Romanized as Soleymān Qeshlāq; also known as Sulaimān Qishlāq and Suleyman-Kishlak) is a village in Kaghazkonan-e Markazi Rural District, Kaghazkonan District, Meyaneh County, East Azerbaijan Province, Iran. At the 2006 census, its population was 30, in 6 families.
