= Bahmanabad, Haftkel =

Bahmanabad بهمن اباد
- Village
- Location within Iran
- Coordinates: 31°37′25″N 49°13′12″E
- Country: Iran
- Province: Khuzestan
- County: Haftgel
- Bakhsh: Raghiveh
- Rural District: Gazin

Population (2006)
  - Total: 19
- Time zone: UTC+3:30 (IRST)
  - Summer (DST): UTC+4:30 (IRDT)

Bahmanabad (Persian: بهمن اباد, also Romanized as Bahmanābād) is a village in Gazin Rural District, Raghiveh District, Haftgel County, Khuzestan Province, Iran. At the 2006 census, its population was 19, in 4 families.
