= Andarud-e Sofla =

Andarud-e Sofla اندرودسفلي
- Village
- Location within Iran
- Coordinates: 37°16′53″N 48°11′38″E
- Country: Iran
- Province: East Azerbaijan
- County: Meyaneh
- Bakhsh: Kaghazkonan
- Rural District: Kaghazkonan-e Markazi

Population (2006)
  - Total: 91
- Time zone: UTC+3:30 (IRST)
  - Summer (DST): UTC+4:30 (IRDT)

Andarud-e Sofla (Persian: اندرودسفلي, also Romanized as Andarud-e Soflá, Andarūd Soflā, and Andrūd-e Soflá; also known as Andarud and Andarūd-e Pā’īn) is a village in Kaghazkonan-e Markazi Rural District, Kaghazkonan District, Meyaneh County, East Azerbaijan Province, Iran. At the 2006 census, its population was 91, in 31 families.
