= Qarab-e Olya =

Qarab-e Olya قاراب عليا
- Village
- Location within Iran
- Coordinates: 37°25′52″N 48°07′44″E
- Country: Iran
- Province: East Azerbaijan
- County: Meyaneh
- Bakhsh: Kaghazkonan
- Rural District: Kaghazkonan-e Shomali

Population (2006)
  - Total: 125
- Time zone: UTC+3:30 (IRST)
  - Summer (DST): UTC+4:30 (IRDT)

Qarab-e Olya (Persian: قاراب عليا, also Romanized as Qārāb-e ‘Olyā; also known as Fārāb-e ‘Olyā, Qārāb, Qārāb Bālā, Qārāb-e Bālā, and Verkhnyaya Kerov) is a village in Kaghazkonan-e Shomali Rural District, Kaghazkonan District, Meyaneh County, East Azerbaijan Province, Iran. At the 2006 census, its population was 125, in 33 families.
