= Rivar =

Rivar may refer to:

- Rivar, England
- Rivar, Iran
