= Qarab =

Qarab (Persian: قاراب), also rendered as Farab and Kerov, may refer to:

- Qarab-e Olya
- Qarab-e Sofla
