= Eypak Rural District =

Rural district in Alborz province, Iran

Eypak Rural District Persian: دهستان ایپک
- Rural district
- Location within Iran
- Coordinates: 35°36′N 50°17′E
- Country: Iran
- Province: Alborz
- County: Eshtehard
- District: Central
- Established: 2012
- Capital: Eypak

Population (2016)
  - Total: 1,854
- Time zone: UTC+3:30 (IRST)

Eypak Rural District (Persian: دهستان ایپک) is in the Central District of Eshtehard County, Alborz province, Iran. Its capital is the village of Eypak.

== History ==
In 2010, Karaj County was separated from Tehran province in the establishment of Alborz province.

In 2012, Eshtehard District was separated from the county in establishing Eshtehard County, and Eypak Rural District was created in the new Central District.

== Demographics ==
=== Population ===
At the time of the 2016 National Census, the rural district's population was 1,854 in 519 households. The most populous of its 13 villages was Eypak, with 781 people.

=== Other villages in the rural district ===
- Hasanabad
- Qanli Bolagh
- Qarah Torpaq
- Qowzlu
