= Jaru, Khuzestan =

Village in Khuzestan province, Iran

Jaru Persian: جارو
- Village
- Location within Iran
- Coordinates: 31°33′01″N 49°32′35″E
- Country: Iran
- Province: Khuzestan
- County: Haftkel
- District: Central
- Rural District: Howmeh

Population (2016)
  - Total: 83
- Time zone: UTC+3:30 (IRST)

Jaru (Persian: جارو) (Note: Also romanized as Jārū; also known as Jārn) is a village in, and the capital of, Howmeh Rural District (Note: Formerly Haftkel Rural District) of the Central District of Haftkel County, Khuzestan province, Iran.

== Demographics ==
=== Population ===
At the time of the 2006 National Census, the village's population was 83 in 21 households, when it was in Haftkel Rural District (Note: Renamed Howmeh Rural District) of the former Haftkel District of Ramhormoz County. The following census in 2011 counted 97 people in 18 households, by which time the district had been separated from the county in the establishment of Haftkel County. The rural district was transferred to the new Central District and renamed Howmeh Rural District. The 2016 census measured the population of the village as 83 people in 21 households.
