= Chowlaqlu =

Village in East Azerbaijan province, Iran

Chowlaqlu Persian: چولاقلو
- Village
- Location within Iran
- Coordinates: 37°17′07″N 47°54′19″E
- Country: Iran
- Province: East Azerbaijan
- County: Mianeh
- District: Kaghazkonan
- Rural District: Qaflankuh-e Sharqi

Population (2016)
  - Total: 111
- Time zone: UTC+3:30 (IRST)

Chowlaqlu (Persian: چولاقلو) (Note: Also romanized as Chowlāqlū; also known as Cholaghloo, Cholakhlu, Cholāklū, and Cholāqlū) is a village in, and the capital of, Qaflankuh-e Sharqi Rural District in Kaghazkonan District of Mianeh County, East Azerbaijan province, Iran.

== Demographics ==
=== Population ===
At the time of the 2006 National Census, the village's population was 151 in 44 households. The following census in 2011 counted 136 people in 41 households. The 2016 census measured the population of the village as 111 people in 39 households.
