= Ahmadabad-e Garus =

Village in East Azerbaijan province, Iran

Ahmadabad-e Garus Persian: احمدآباد گروس
- Village
- Location within Iran
- Coordinates: 37°21′22″N 47°56′49″E
- Country: Iran
- Province: East Azerbaijan
- County: Mianeh
- District: Kaghazkonan
- Rural District: Qaflankuh-e Sharqi

Population (2016)
  - Total: 296
- Time zone: UTC+3:30 (IRST)

Ahmadabad-e Garus (Persian: احمدآباد گروس) (Note: Also romanized as Aḩmadābād-e Garūs; also known as Aḩmadābād) is a village in Qaflankuh-e Sharqi Rural District of Kaghazkonan District in Mianeh County, East Azerbaijan province, Iran.

== Demographics ==
=== Population ===
At the time of the 2006 National Census, the village's population was 516 in 116 households. The following census in 2011 counted 387 people in 130 households. The 2016 census measured the population of the village as 296 people in 109 households.
