= Allahlu, Mianeh =

Village in East Azerbaijan province, Iran

Allahlu Persian: لله لو
- Village
- Location within Iran
- Coordinates: 37°18′45″N 48°00′53″E
- Country: Iran
- Province: East Azerbaijan
- County: Mianeh
- District: Kaghazkonan
- Rural District: Qaflankuh-e Sharqi

Population (2016)
  - Total: 640
- Time zone: UTC+3:30 (IRST)

Allahlu (Persian: لله لو) (Note: Also romanized as Allahlū; also known as Lalahlū, Lalakhlu, Lalehlū, and Lallahlū) is a village in Qaflankuh-e Sharqi Rural District of Kaghazkonan District in Mianeh County, East Azerbaijan province, Iran.

== Demographics ==
=== Population ===
At the time of the 2006 National Census, the village's population was 520 in 155 households. The following census in 2011 counted 415 people in 127 households. The 2016 census measured the population of the village as 640 people in 215 households. It was the most populous village in its rural district.
