= Shirin Bolagh, East Azerbaijan =

Village in East Azerbaijan province, Iran

Shirin Bolagh Persian: شيرين بلاغ
- Village
- Location within Iran
- Coordinates: 37°16′00″N 48°00′42″E
- Country: Iran
- Province: East Azerbaijan
- County: Mianeh
- District: Kaghazkonan
- Rural District: Kaghazkonan-e Markazi

Population (2016)
  - Total: 136
- Time zone: UTC+3:30 (IRST)

Shirin Bolagh (Persian: شيرين بلاغ) (Note: Also romanized as Shīrīn Bolāgh; also known as Shirin Bulag and Shirīnbulāq) is a village in Kaghazkonan-e Markazi Rural District of Kaghazkonan District in Mianeh County, East Azerbaijan province, Iran.

== Demographics ==
=== Population ===
At the time of the 2006 National Census, the village's population was 133 in 33 households. The following census in 2011 counted 131 people in 44 households. The 2016 census measured the population of the village as 136 people in 42 households.
