= Raghiveh Rural District =

Rural district in Khuzestan province, Iran

Raghiveh Rural District Persian: دهستان رغیوه
- Rural District
- Location within Iran
- Coordinates: 31°32′15″N 49°17′24″E
- Country: Iran
- Province: Khuzestan
- County: Haftkel
- District: Raghiveh
- Capital: Raghiveh

Population (2016)
  - Total: 3,739
- Time zone: UTC+3:30 (IRST)

Raghiveh Rural District (Persian: دهستان رغیوه) is in Raghiveh District of Haftkel County, Khuzestan province, Iran. It is administered from the city of Raghiveh.

== History ==
After the 2006 National Census, Haftkel District was separated from Ramhormoz County in the establishment of Haftkel County, and Raghiveh Rural District was created in the new Raghiveh District.

== Demographics ==
=== Population ===
At the time of the 2011 census, the rural district's population was 3,887 in 825 households. The 2016 census measured the population of the rural district as 3,739 in 932 households. The most populous of its 28 villages was Shajirat, with 512 people.
