= Qarab-e Sofla =

Qarab-e Sofla قاراب سفلي
- Village
- Location within Iran
- Coordinates: 37°24′47″N 48°09′12″E
- Country: Iran
- Province: East Azerbaijan
- County: Meyaneh
- Bakhsh: Kaghazkonan
- Rural District: Kaghazkonan-e Shomali

Population (2006)
  - Total: 39
- Time zone: UTC+3:30 (IRST)
  - Summer (DST): UTC+4:30 (IRDT)

Qarab-e Sofla (Persian: قاراب سفلي, also Romanized as Qārāb-e Soflá; also known as Fārāb-e Soflá, Kerov Ashagi, Nizhnyaya Kerov, and Qārāb Pā’īn) is a village in Kaghazkonan-e Shomali Rural District, Kaghazkonan District, Meyaneh County, East Azerbaijan Province, Iran. At the 2006 census, its population was 39, in 16 families.
