= Nomreh-ye Do =

Nomreh-ye Do or Nomreh Do (Persian: نمره دو) may refer to:

- Nomreh-ye Do, Haftgel
- Nomreh Do, Omidiyeh
