= Palangabad, Alborz =

City in Alborz province, Iran

Palangabad Persian: پلنگ‌آباد
- City
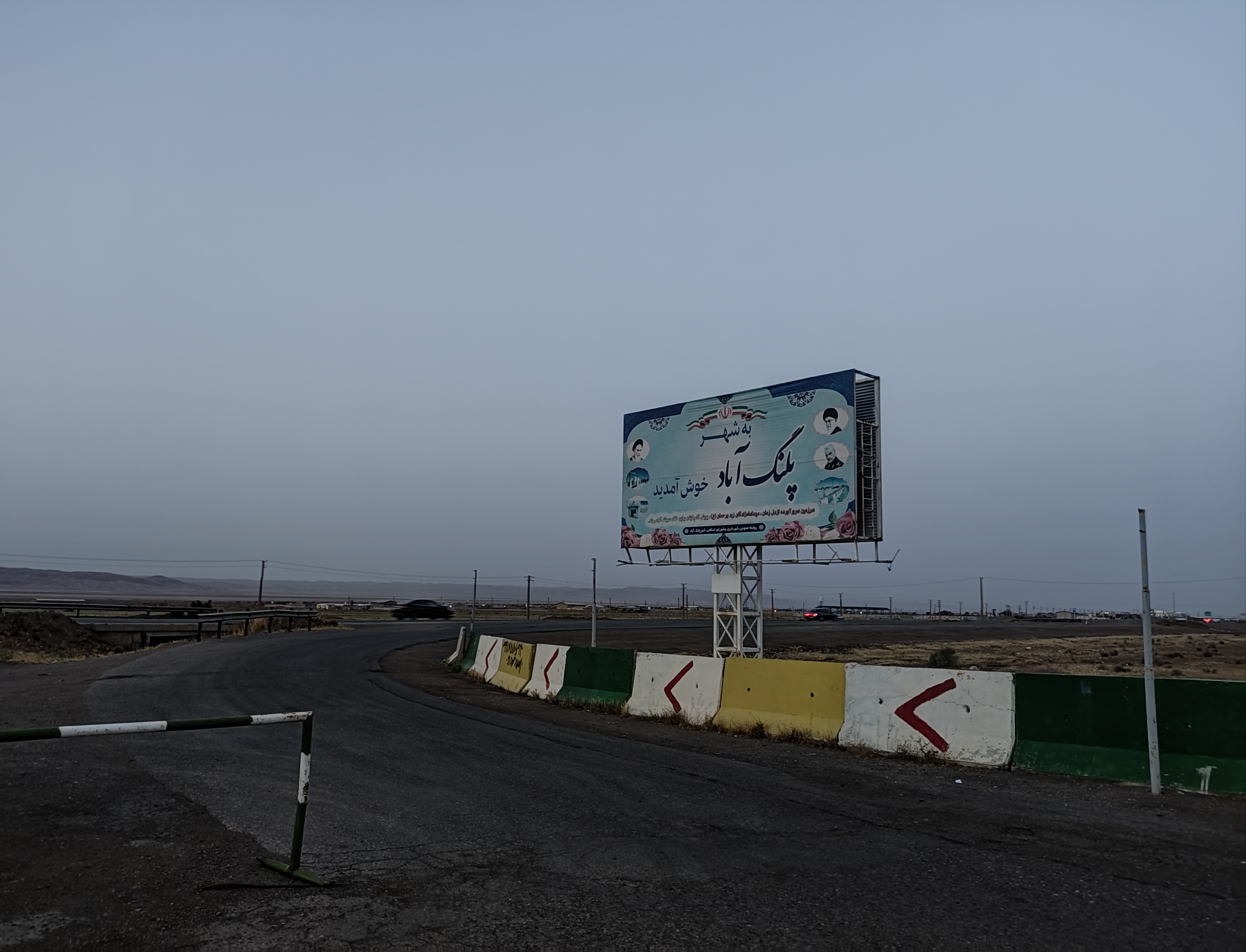

- Location within Iran
- Coordinates: 35°44′04″N 50°37′22″E
- Country: Iran
- Province: Alborz
- County: Eshtehard
- District: Palangabad
- Established as a city: 2018

Population (2016)
  - Total: 1,012
- Time zone: UTC+3:30 (IRST)

Palangabad (Persian: پلنگ‌آباد) (Note: Also romanized as Palangābād; also known as Qelīchābād) is a city in, and the capital of, Palangabad District in Eshtehard County, Alborz province, Iran. It also serves as the administrative center for Palangabad Rural District.

== Demographics ==
=== Population ===
At the time of the 2006 National Census, Palangabad's population was 1,026 in 285 households, when it was a village in Palangabad Rural District of the former Eshtehard District in Karaj County, Tehran province. In 2010, the county was separated from the province in the establishment of Alborz province. In 2012, the district was separated from the county in establishing Eshtehard County, and the rural district was transferred to the new Palangabad District. The 2016 census measured the population of the village as 1,012 in 306 households. It was the most populous village in its rural district.

Palangabad was converted to a city in 2018.
