= Astanjin =

Village in East Azerbaijan province, Iran

Astanjin Persian: استانجين
- Village
- Location within Iran
- Coordinates: 37°15′04″N 48°14′34″E
- Country: Iran
- Province: East Azerbaijan
- County: Mianeh
- District: Kaghazkonan
- Rural District: Kaghazkonan-e Markazi

Population (2016)
  - Total: 255
- Time zone: UTC+3:30 (IRST)

Astanjin (Persian: استانجين) (Note: Also romanized as Āstānajīn, Āstanjīn, and Astānjīn; also known as Asnānjīn, Astaniya, and Āstatjīn) is a village in Kaghazkonan-e Markazi Rural District of Kaghazkonan District in Mianeh County, East Azerbaijan province, Iran.

== Demographics ==
=== Language ===
The people of this village speak Azerbaijani.

=== Population ===
At the time of the 2006 National Census, the village's population was 421 in 106 households. The following census in 2011 counted 296 people in 93 households. The 2016 census measured the population of the village as 255 people in 96 households. It was the most populous village in its rural district.

== Economy ==
The main occupation of the people of this village is animal husbandry and agriculture. Some Astanjini people work in the village in spring and summer and work in Tehran in autumn and winter. Most Astanjins living in Tehran live in Aliabad and Yakhchi Abad and cooperate in many cultural and social activities.

Astanjin village has extensive agricultural lands and gardens. The agricultural products of this village are mostly wheat and lentils. Also in its gardens, in addition to many walnut and mulberry trees can be found, you can find a variety of fruits such as apples, pears, cherries, hawthorn, grapes, plums, figs, berries and .... The people of this village provide their dairy products with livestock and their cattle and sheep.

== Climate ==
The climate of this village is usually cool in spring and summer and the first half of autumn and cold in winter and the second half of autumn.

== Religious facilities ==
In this village two shrines are visited by the villagers and the surrounding villages. These two shrines are named after Imamzadeh Ali and Imamzadeh Mohammad, which are registered on the official website The Imams of the country and are the descendants of Imam Jafar Sadegh.

== Education, health, and technology ==
This village has a school and a health house, as well as a satellite TV and telecommunication tower. A health house with medium facilities named after Martyr Mohammad Sepehri and Martyr Saeed Naseri has been built in it. The school of this village is named after Martyr Ayvaz Rafiei. Water piping has been done in this village and the villagers also benefit from electricity and gas.

== Amenities ==
The gardens of this village are divided into three main parts: "dermanlar", "Guney" and "Guzey", which respectively, mean the place of mills and sunshade, and the place of shade.

== Construction ==
Among the unfinished projects in this village is the Hadi project in recent years, which has remained half-finished due to lack of budget. To expand the inner road of the village, some villagers took steps to develop the village by donating their land.
