= Andarud-e Olya =

Andarud-e Olya اندرودعليا
- Village
- Location within Iran
- Coordinates: 37°16′46″N 48°09′36″E
- Country: Iran
- Province: East Azerbaijan
- County: Meyaneh
- Bakhsh: Kaghazkonan
- Rural District: Kaghazkonan-e Markazi

Population (2006)
  - Total: 61
- Time zone: UTC+3:30 (IRST)
  - Summer (DST): UTC+4:30 (IRDT)

Andarud-e Olya (Persian: اندرودعليا, also Romanized as Andarūd-e ‘Olyā, Andarūd ‘Olyā, and Andrūd-e ‘Olyā; also known as Andarūd, Andarūd-e Bālā, and Andrūd-e Bālā) is a village in Kaghazkonan-e Markazi Rural District, Kaghazkonan District, Meyaneh County, East Azerbaijan Province, Iran. At the 2006 census, its population was 61, in 31 families.
