= Raghiveh, Haftkel =

City in Khuzestan province, Iran

Raghiveh Persian: رغيوه
- City
- Location within Iran
- Coordinates: 31°32′58″N 49°14′26″E
- Country: Iran
- Province: Khuzestan
- County: Haftkel
- District: Raghiveh

Population (2016)
  - Total: 452
- Time zone: UTC+3:30 (IRST)

Raghiveh (Persian: رغيوه) (Note: Also romanized as Ragheyveh, Raghīveh, and Rogheyveh; also known as Ragiba, Raqeyveh, Raqībeh, Raqive, Raqīveh, Rīvār, Rogheyveh Ḩājī ‘Alī, and Rogheyveh Ḩājjī ‘Alī) is a city in, and the capital of, Raghiveh District of Haftkel County, Khuzestan province, Iran. It also serves as the administrative center for Raghiveh Rural District.

== Demographics ==
=== Population ===
At the time of the 2006 National Census, Raghiveh's population was 427 in 86 households, when it was a village in Gazin Rural District of the former Haftkel District of Ramhormoz County. The following census in 2011 counted 466 people in 112 households, by which time the district had been separated from the county in the establishment of Haftkel County. The rural district was transferred to the new Raghiveh District, and Raghiveh was transferred to Raghiveh Rural District created in the district. The 2016 census measured the population of the village as 452 people in 124 households.

After the census, the village was elevated to the status of a city.
