= Yanbolagh, East Azerbaijan =

Village in East Azerbaijan province, Iran

Yanbolagh Persian: يان بلاغ
- Village
- Location within Iran
- Coordinates: 37°21′31″N 48°01′27″E
- Country: Iran
- Province: East Azerbaijan
- County: Mianeh
- District: Kaghazkonan
- Rural District: Kaghazkonan-e Shomali

Population (2016)
  - Total: 176
- Time zone: UTC+3:30 (IRST)

Yanbolagh (Persian: يان بلاغ) (Note: Also romanized as Yānbolāgh; also known as Yan-Bulag and Yānbulāq) is a village in Kaghazkonan-e Shomali Rural District of Kaghazkonan District in Mianeh County, East Azerbaijan province, Iran.

== Demographics ==
=== Population ===
At the time of the 2006 National Census, the village's population was 318 in 90 households. The following census in 2011 counted 150 people in 56 households. The 2016 census measured the population of the village as 176 people in 70 households.
