= Baghjeghaz-e Sofla =

Baghjeghaz-e Sofla باغچغازسفلي
- Village
- Location within Iran
- Coordinates: 37°18′01″N 47°53′01″E
- Country: Iran
- Province: East Azerbaijan
- County: Meyaneh
- Bakhsh: Kaghazkonan
- Rural District: Qaflankuh-e Sharqi

Population (2006)
  - Total: 21
- Time zone: UTC+3:30 (IRST)
  - Summer (DST): UTC+4:30 (IRDT)

Baghjeghaz-e Sofla (Persian: باغچغازسفلي, also Romanized as Bāghjeghāz-e Soflá; also known as Baghchehqāz-e Soflá and Bāghjeghāz-e Pā'īn) is a village in Qaflankuh-e Sharqi Rural District, Kaghazkonan District, Meyaneh County, East Azerbaijan Province, Iran. At the 2006 census, its population was 21, in 7 families.
