= Nomreh-ye Do, Haftkel =

Nomreh-ye Do نمره دو
- Village
- Location within Iran
- Coordinates: 31°26′22″N 49°33′24″E
- Country: Iran
- Province: Khuzestan
- County: Haftgel
- Bakhsh: Central
- Rural District: Howmeh

Population (2006)
  - Total: 244
- Time zone: UTC+3:30 (IRST)
  - Summer (DST): UTC+4:30 (IRDT)

Nomreh-ye Do (Persian: نمره دو, also Romanized as Nomreh Do) is a village in Howmeh Rural District, in the Central District of Haftgel County, Khuzestan Province, Iran. At the 2006 census, its population was 244, in 47 families.
