= Gugerd =

Gugerd (Persian: گوگرد) may refer to:

- Gugerd, Kermanshah
- Gugerd, Khuzestan
- Gugerd, West Azerbaijan
