= Mendejin =

Village in East Azerbaijan province, Iran

Mendejin Persian: مندجين
- Village
- Location within Iran
- Coordinates: 37°21′36″N 48°13′36″E
- Country: Iran
- Province: East Azerbaijan
- County: Mianeh
- District: Kaghazkonan
- Rural District: Kaghazkonan-e Markazi

Population (2016)
  - Total: 139
- Time zone: UTC+3:30 (IRST)

Mendejin (Persian: مندجين) (Note: Also romanized as Mendājīn and Mendejīn; also known as Mīndajīn, Mindedzhin, and Mindejīn) is a village in Kaghazkonan-e Markazi Rural District of Kaghazkonan District in Mianeh County, East Azerbaijan province, Iran.

== Demographics ==
=== Population ===
At the time of the 2006 National Census, the village's population was 72 in 23 households. The following census in 2011 counted 138 people in 55 households. The 2016 census measured the population of the village as 139 people in 57 households.
