= Gav, Iran =

Village in East Azerbaijan province, Iran

Gav Persian: گاو
- Village
- Location within Iran
- Coordinates: 37°18′03″N 48°16′32″E
- Country: Iran
- Province: East Azerbaijan
- County: Mianeh
- District: Kaghazkonan
- Rural District: Kaghazkonan-e Markazi

Population (2016)
  - Total: 172
- Time zone: UTC+3:30 (IRST)

Gav (Persian: گاو) (Note: Also romanized as Gāv; also known as Sardar Rashid Shahid Mehdi Bakari (سردار رشید شهید مهدی باکری)) is a village in Kaghazkonan-e Markazi Rural District of Kaghazkonan District in Mianeh County, East Azerbaijan province, Iran.

== Demographics ==
=== Population ===
At the time of the 2006 National Census, the village's population was 384 in 96 households. The following census in 2011 counted 305 people in 87 households. The 2016 census measured the population of the village as 172 people in 69 households.
