= Khvordeh Bolagh =

Village in East Azerbaijan province, Iran

Khvordeh Bolagh Persian: خورده بلاغ
- Village
- Location within Iran
- Coordinates: 37°25′38″N 48°03′12″E
- Country: Iran
- Province: East Azerbaijan
- County: Mianeh
- District: Kaghazkonan
- Rural District: Kaghazkonan-e Shomali

Population (2016)
  - Total: 151
- Time zone: UTC+3:30 (IRST)

Khvordeh Bolagh (Persian: خورده بلاغ) (Note: Also romanized as Khvordeh Bolāgh; also known as Hardabulāq, Kharda-Bulakh, Khordeh Bālā, and Khordeh Bolāgh) is a village in Kaghazkonan-e Shomali Rural District of Kaghazkonan District in Mianeh County, East Azerbaijan province, Iran.

== Demographics ==
=== Population ===
At the time of the 2006 National Census, the village's population was 301 in 82 households. The following census in 2011 counted 172 people in 56 households. The 2016 census measured the population of the village as 151 people in 59 households.
