= Kalyan, Mianeh =

Village in East Azerbaijan province, Iran

Kalyan Persian: كليان
- Village
- Location within Iran
- Coordinates: 37°24′18″N 48°01′12″E
- Country: Iran
- Province: East Azerbaijan
- County: Mianeh
- District: Kaghazkonan
- Rural District: Kaghazkonan-e Shomali

Population (2016)
  - Total: 191
- Time zone: UTC+3:30 (IRST)

Kalyan (Persian: كليان) (Note: Also romanized as Kalian and Kalyān; also known as Qaliān and Qalyān) is a village in Kaghazkonan-e Shomali Rural District of Kaghazkonan District in Mianeh County, East Azerbaijan province, Iran.

== Demographics ==
=== Population ===
At the time of the 2006 National Census, the village's population was 155 in 42 households. The following census in 2011 counted 113 people in 43 households. The 2016 census measured the population of the village as 191 people in 61 households.
