= Qarah Bolagh, Kaghazkonan =

Village in East Azerbaijan province, Iran

Qarah Bolagh Persian: قره بلاغ
- Village
- Location within Iran
- Coordinates: 37°18′50″N 48°04′15″E
- Country: Iran
- Province: East Azerbaijan
- County: Mianeh
- District: Kaghazkonan
- Rural District: Kaghazkonan-e Shomali

Population (2016)
  - Total: 865
- Time zone: UTC+3:30 (IRST)

Qarah Bolagh (Persian: قره بلاغ) (Note: Also romanized as Qarah Bolāgh and Qareh Bolāgh; also known as Kara-Bulag, Qarabulāq, and Qareh Būlāgh) is a village in, and the capital of, Kaghazkonan-e Shomali Rural District in Kaghazkonan District of Mianeh County, East Azerbaijan province, Iran.

== Demographics ==
=== Population ===
At the time of the 2006 National Census, the village's population was 471 in 141 households. The following census in 2011 counted 366 people in 121 households. The 2016 census measured the population of the village as 865 people in 272 households. It was the most populous village in its rural district.
