= Goltappeh-ye Hasanabad =

Village in East Azerbaijan province, Iran

Goltappeh-ye Hasanabad Persian: گل تپه حسن اباد
- Village
- Location within Iran
- Coordinates: 37°17′56″N 47°58′30″E
- Country: Iran
- Province: East Azerbaijan
- County: Mianeh
- District: Kaghazkonan
- Rural District: Qaflankuh-e Sharqi

Population (2016)
  - Total: 184
- Time zone: UTC+3:30 (IRST)

Goltappeh-ye Hasanabad (Persian: گل تپه حسن اباد) (Note: Also romanized as Goltappeh-ye Ḩasanābād; also known as Gol Tappeh) is a village in Qaflankuh-e Sharqi Rural District of Kaghazkonan District in Mianeh County, East Azerbaijan province, Iran.

== Demographics ==
=== Population ===
At the time of the 2006 National Census, the village's population was 275 in 71 households. The following census in 2011 counted 168 people in 41 households. The 2016 census measured the population of the village as 184 people in 63 households.
