= Aqkand =

City in East Azerbaijan province, Iran

Aqkand Persian: آقكند
- City
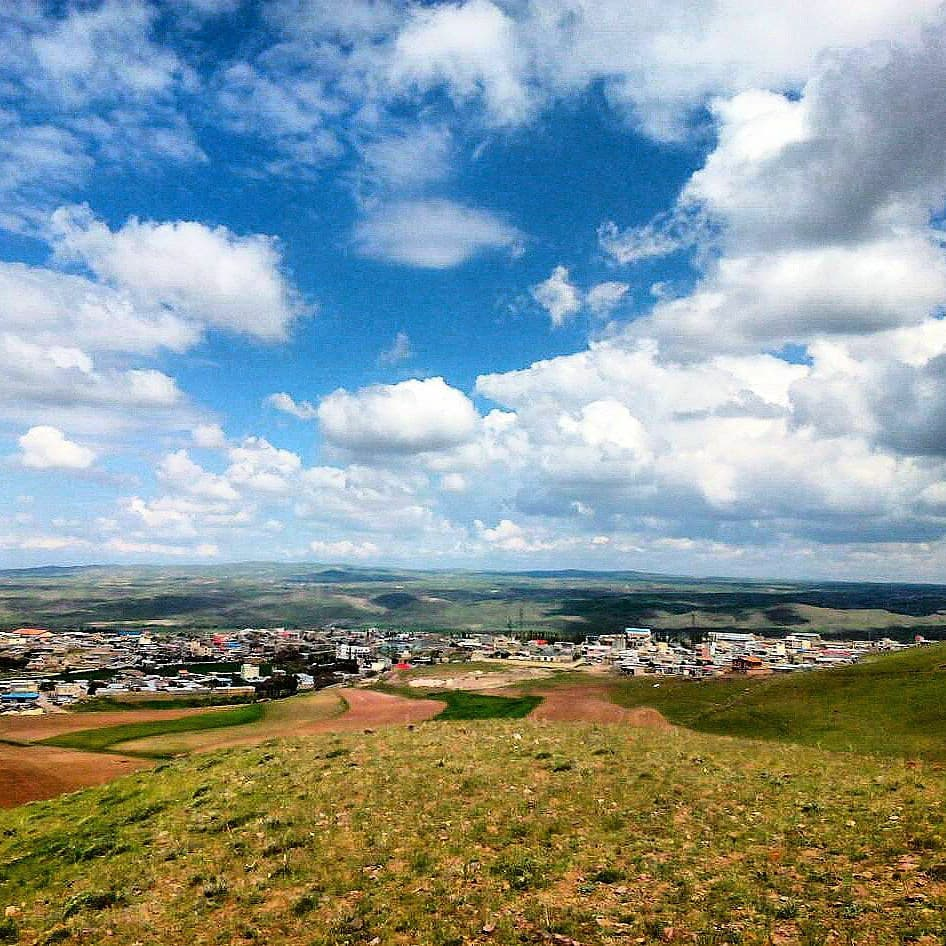

- Location within Iran
- Coordinates: 37°15′23″N 48°03′58″E
- Country: Iran
- Province: East Azerbaijan
- County: Mianeh
- District: Kaghazkonan

Population (2016)
  - Total: 2,902
- Time zone: UTC+3:30 (IRST)

Aqkand (Persian: آقكند) (Note: Also Romanized as Āq Kand and Āqkand; also known as Āgh Kand and Ak-Kend) is a city in Kaghazkonan District of Mianeh County, East Azerbaijan province, Iran, serving as the administrative center for Kaghazkonan-e Markazi Rural District.

== Demographics ==
=== Population ===
At the time of the 2006 National Census, the city's population was 1,823 in 477 households. The following census in 2011 counted 1,733 people in 544 households. The 2016 census measured the population of the city as 2,902 people in 913 households.
