= Kondek-e Khanjar =

Kondek-e Khanjar كندك خنجر
- Village
- Location within Iran
- Coordinates: 31°28′42″N 49°21′45″E
- Country: Iran
- Province: Khuzestan
- County: Haftgel
- Bakhsh: Raghiveh
- Rural District: Gazin

Population (2006)
  - Total: 65
- Time zone: UTC+3:30 (IRST)
  - Summer (DST): UTC+4:30 (IRDT)

Kondek-e Khanjar (Persian: كندك خنجر; also known as Kondak-e Sarāydīn, Kondek-e Yek, Kondok-e Sarāyeddīn, Kondok Sarāyeddīn, and Kundak Sarāyeddīn) is a village in Gazin Rural District, Raghiveh District, Haftgel County, Khuzestan Province, Iran. At the 2006 census, its population was 65, in 11 families.
