= Baghjeghaz-e Olya =

Village in East Azerbaijan province, Iran

Baghjeghaz-e Olya Persian: باغجغازعليا
- Village
- Location within Iran
- Coordinates: 37°19′27″N 47°55′45″E
- Country: Iran
- Province: East Azerbaijan
- County: Mianeh
- District: Kaghazkonan
- Rural District: Qaflankuh-e Sharqi

Population (2016)
  - Total: 267
- Time zone: UTC+3:30 (IRST)

Baghjeghaz-e Olya (Persian: باغجغازعليا) (Note: Also romanized as Bāghjeghāz-e ‘Olyā; also known as Baghchehqāz-e Bālā and Bāghjeghāz-e Bālā) is a village in Qaflankuh-e Sharqi Rural District of Kaghazkonan District in Mianeh County, East Azerbaijan province, Iran.

== Demographics ==
=== Population ===
At the time of the 2006 National Census, the village's population was 306 in 83 households. The following census in 2011 counted 303 people in 106 households. The 2016 census measured the population of the village as 267 people in 101 households.
