= Gondek-e Isa =

Gondek-e Isa گندك عيسي
- Village
- Location within Iran
- Coordinates: 31°29′25″N 49°19′58″E
- Country: Iran
- Province: Khuzestan
- County: Haftgel
- Bakhsh: Raghiveh
- Rural District: Gazin

Population (2006)
  - Total: 161
- Time zone: UTC+3:30 (IRST)
  - Summer (DST): UTC+4:30 (IRDT)

Gondek-e Isa (Persian: گندك عيسي, also Romanized as Gondek-e ‘Īsá; also known as Kondak, Kondek-e ‘Īsá, and Kundak) is a village in Gazin Rural District, Raghiveh District, Haftgel County, Khuzestan Province, Iran. At the 2006 census, its population was 161, in 27 families.
