= Qusheh Bolagh, Mianeh =

Village in East Azerbaijan province, Iran

Qusheh Bolagh Persian: قوشه بلاغ
- Village
- Location within Iran
- Coordinates: 37°22′48″N 47°59′49″E
- Country: Iran
- Province: East Azerbaijan
- County: Mianeh
- District: Kaghazkonan
- Rural District: Qaflankuh-e Sharqi

Population (2016)
  - Total: 388
- Time zone: UTC+3:30 (IRST)

Qusheh Bolagh (Persian: قوشه بلاغ) (Note: Also romanized as Qūsheh Bolāgh) is a village in Qaflankuh-e Sharqi Rural District of Kaghazkonan District in Mianeh County, East Azerbaijan province, Iran.

== Demographics ==
=== Population ===
At the time of the 2006 National Census, the village's population was 526 in 179 households. The following census in 2011 counted 578 people in 213 households. The 2016 census measured the population of the village as 388 people in 156 households.
