= Jaru Rural District =

Rural district in Alborz province, Iran

Jaru Rural District Persian: دهستان جارو
- Rural District
- Location within Iran
- Coordinates: 35°43′N 50°30′E
- Country: Iran
- Province: Alborz
- County: Eshtehard
- District: Palangabad
- Established: 2012
- Capital: Jaru

Population (2016)
  - Total: 1,407
- Time zone: UTC+03:30 (IRST)

Jaru Rural District (Persian: دهستان جارو) is in Palangabad District of Eshtehard County, Alborz province, Iran. Its capital is the village of Jaru.

== History ==
In 2010, Karaj County was separated from Tehran province in the establishment of Alborz province.

In 2012, Eshtehard District was separated from the county in establishing Eshtehard County, and Jaru Rural District was created in the new Palangabad District.

== Demographics ==
=== Population ===
At the time of the 2016 National Census, the rural district's population was 1,407 in 445 households. The most populous of its 12 villages was Jaru, with 766 people.

=== Other villages in the rural district ===
- Fardabad
- Mehdiabad
- Mokhtarabad
- Morghdari-ye Kasht va Sanat Doab
- Qeshlaq-e Gong
