= Bahmanabad, East Azerbaijan =

Village in East Azerbaijan province, Iran

Bahmanabad Persian: بهمن اباد
- Village
- Location within Iran
- Coordinates: 37°21′17″N 48°03′15″E
- Country: Iran
- Province: East Azerbaijan
- County: Mianeh
- District: Kaghazkonan
- Rural District: Kaghazkonan-e Shomali

Population (2016)
  - Total: 196
- Time zone: UTC+3:30 (IRST)

Bahmanabad (Persian: بهمن اباد) (Note: Also romanized as Bahmanābād and Behmanābād; also known as Bagmanovant) is a village in Kaghazkonan-e Shomali Rural District of Kaghazkonan District in Mianeh County, East Azerbaijan province, Iran.

== Demographics ==
=== Population ===
At the time of the 2006 National Census, the village's population was 126 in 37 households. The following census in 2011 counted 162 people in 66 households. The 2016 census measured the population of the village as 196 people in 68 households.
