= Haftkel =

City in Khuzestan province, Iran

Haftkel Persian: هفتکل
- City
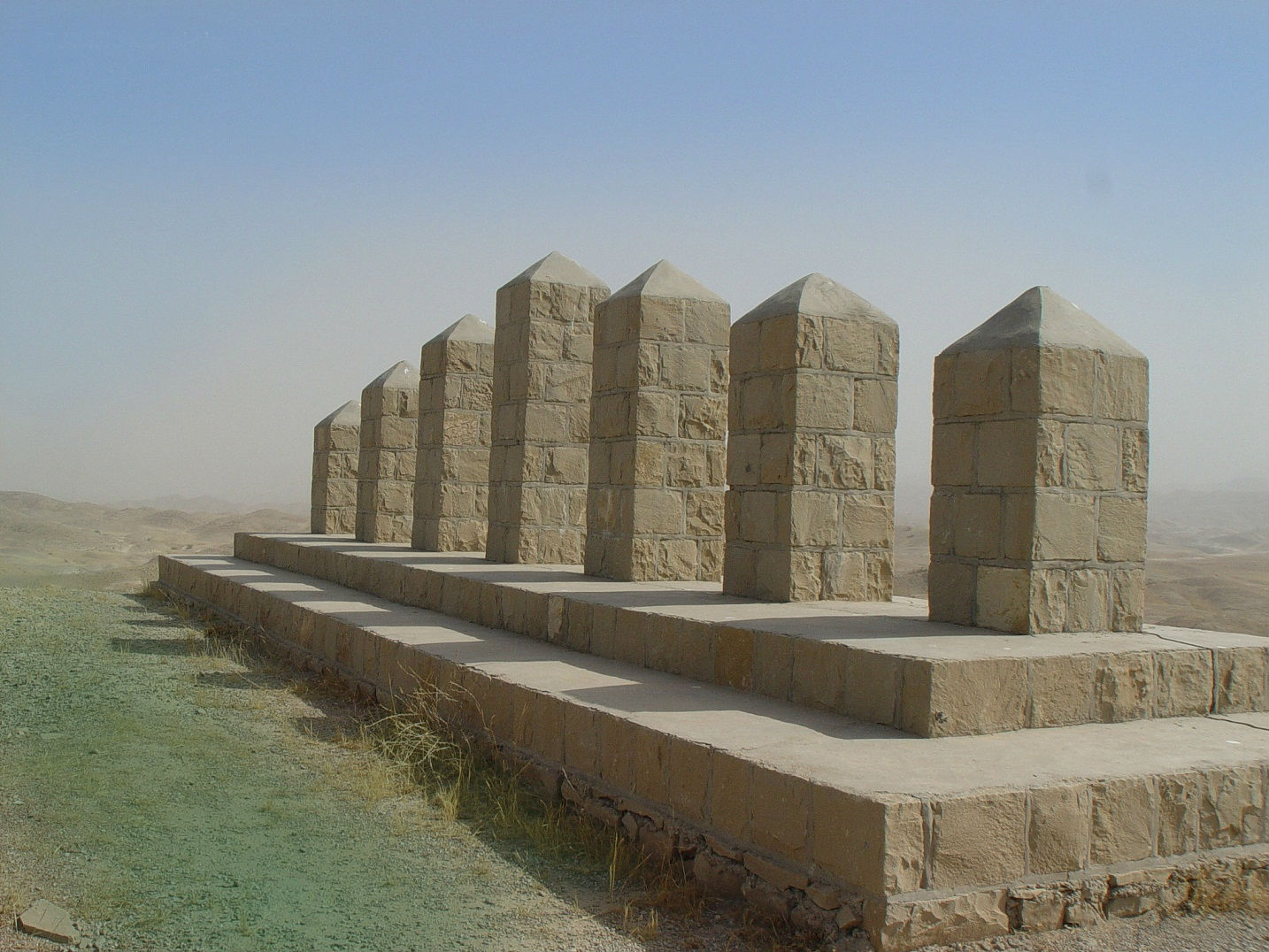

- Location within Iran
- Coordinates: 31°26′40″N 49°31′53″E
- Country: Iran
- Province: Khuzestan
- County: Haftkel
- District: Central

Government
  - Mayor: Mehdi Mahmoudi

Population (2016)
  - Total: 15,802
- Time zone: UTC+3:30 (IRST)

Haftkel (Persian: هفتکل;) (Note: Also known as Haftgel (هفتگل)) is a city in the Central District of Haftkel County, Khuzestan province, Iran, serving as capital of both the county and the district.

== Demographics ==
=== Population ===
At the time of the 2006 National Census, the city's population was 14,735 in 3,153 households, when it was capital of the former Haftkel District of Ramhormoz County. The following census in 2011 counted 14,877 people in 3,706 households, by which time the district had been separated from the county in the establishment of Haftkel County. Haftkel was transferred to the new Central District as the county's capital. The 2016 census measured the population of the city as 15,802 people in 4,283 households.
