= Abu Oleymeh, Ramshir =

Abu Oleymeh ابوعليمه
- Village
- Location within Iran
- Coordinates: 30°54′45″N 49°26′02″E
- Country: Iran
- Province: Khuzestan
- County: Ramshir
- Bakhsh: Central
- Rural District: Abdoliyeh-ye Gharbi

Population (2006)
  - Total: 64
- Time zone: UTC+3:30 (IRST)
  - Summer (DST): UTC+4:30 (IRDT)

Abu Oleymeh (Persian: ابوعليمه, romanized: Abū ‘Oleymeh, Abū ‘Aleymeh, and Abū ‘Alīmeh) is a village in Abdoliyeh-ye Gharbi Rural District, in the Central District of Ramshir County, Khuzestan Province, Iran. At the 2006 census, its population was 64, in 10 families.
