= Nomreh-ye Seh-e Kupal =

Nomreh-ye Seh-e Kupal نمره سه كوپال
- Village
- Location within Iran
- Coordinates: 31°14′34″N 49°10′11″E
- Country: Iran
- Province: Khuzestan
- County: Ahvaz
- Bakhsh: Central
- Rural District: Gheyzaniyeh

Population (2006)
  - Total: 319
- Time zone: UTC+3:30 (IRST)
  - Summer (DST): UTC+4:30 (IRDT)

Nomreh-ye Seh-e Kupal (Persian: نمره سه كوپال, also Romanized as Nomreh-ye Seh-e Kūpāl; also known as Nomreh-ye Seh) is a village in Gheyzaniyeh Rural District, in the Central District of Ahvaz County, Khuzestan Province, Iran. At the 2006 census, its population was 319, in 69 families.
