= Bahmanabad, Chaharmahal and Bakhtiari =

Bahmanabad بهمن اباد
- Village
- Location within Iran
- Coordinates: 32°10′19″N 50°17′28″E
- Country: Iran
- Province: Chaharmahal and Bakhtiari
- County: Kuhrang
- Bakhsh: Bazoft
- Rural District: Doab

Population (2006)
  - Total: 196
- Time zone: UTC+3:30 (IRST)
  - Summer (DST): UTC+4:30 (IRDT)

Bahmanabad (Persian: بهمن اباد, also Romanized as Bahmanābād) is a village in Doab Rural District, Bazoft District, Kuhrang County, Chaharmahal and Bakhtiari Province, Iran. At the 2006 census, its population was 196, in 33 families. The village is populated by Lurs.
