= Nomreh-ye Yazdah =

Nomreh-ye Yazdah نمره يازده
- Village
- Location within Iran
- Coordinates: 31°56′35″N 49°17′03″E
- Country: Iran
- Province: Khuzestan
- County: Masjed Soleyman
- Bakhsh: Golgir
- Rural District: Tombi Golgir

Population (2006)
  - Total: 341
- Time zone: UTC+3:30 (IRST)
  - Summer (DST): UTC+4:30 (IRDT)

Nomreh-ye Yazdah (Persian: نمره يازده, also Romanized as Nomreh-ye Yāzdah and Nomreh Yāzdah; also known as Nomreh Vāzdah) is a village in Tombi Golgir Rural District, Golgir District, Masjed Soleyman County, Khuzestan Province, Iran. At the 2006 census, its population was 341, in 69 families.
