= Bahmanabad, Shahr-e Babak =

Bahmanabad بهمن اباد
- Village
- Location within Iran
- Coordinates: 30°04′07″N 55°04′34″E
- Country: Iran
- Province: Kerman
- County: Shahr-e Babak
- Bakhsh: Central
- Rural District: Estabraq

Population (2006)
  - Total: 31
- Time zone: UTC+3:30 (IRST)
  - Summer (DST): UTC+4:30 (IRDT)

Bahmanabad (Persian: بهمن اباد, also Romanized as Bahmanābād) is a village in Estabraq Rural District, in the Central District of Shahr-e Babak County, Kerman Province, Iran. At the 2006 census, its population was 31, in 9 families.
