= Bohnabad =

Bohnabad بهن اباد
- Village
- Location within Iran
- Coordinates: 32°46′30″N 59°24′16″E
- Country: Iran
- Province: South Khorasan
- County: Birjand
- Bakhsh: Central
- Rural District: Baqeran

Population (2006)
  - Total: 22
- Time zone: UTC+3:30 (IRST)
  - Summer (DST): UTC+4:30 (IRDT)

Bohnabad (Persian: بهن اباد, also Romanized as Bohnābād and Buhnābād; also known as Bonābād and Bahmanābād) is a village in Baqeran Rural District, in the Central District of Birjand County, South Khorasan Province, Iran. At the 2006 census, its population was 22, in 6 families.
