= Bahmanabad, Behbahan =

Bahmanabad بهمن اباد
- Village
- Location within Iran
- Coordinates: 30°29′50″N 50°14′08″E
- Country: Iran
- Province: Khuzestan
- County: Behbahan
- Bakhsh: Central
- Rural District: Howmeh

Population (2006)
  - Total: 15
- Time zone: UTC+3:30 (IRST)
  - Summer (DST): UTC+4:30 (IRDT)

Bahmanabad (Persian: بهمن اباد, also Romanized as Bahmanābād; also known as Hajī Bahman) is a village in Howmeh Rural District, in the Central District of Behbahan County, Khuzestan Province, Iran. At the 2006 census, its population was 15, in 4 families.
