= Eshtehard =

City in Alborz province, Iran

Eshtehard Persian: اشتهارد
- City
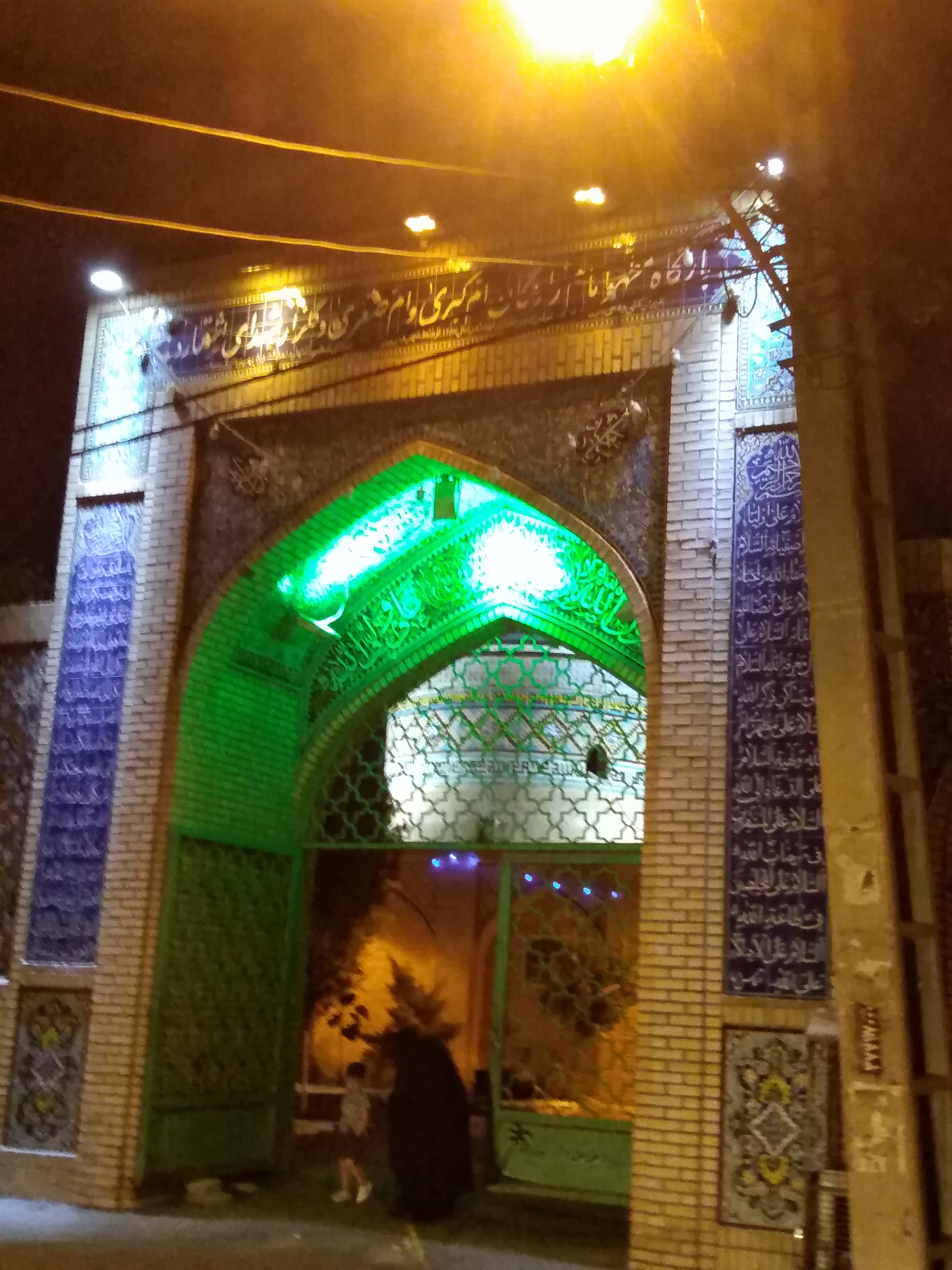
- A holy place in the city of Esthehard

- Location within Iran
- Coordinates: 35°43′17″N 50°21′53″E
- Country: Iran
- Province: Alborz
- County: Eshtehard
- District: Central

Population (2016)
  - Total: 29,993
- Time zone: UTC+3:30 (IRST)

Eshtehard (Persian: اشتهارد) (Note: Also romanized as Eŝtehārd; and Tati: Eŝtāhārd) is a city in the Central District of Eshtehard County, Alborz province, Iran, serving as capital of both the county and the district.

== Demographics ==
=== Language and ethnicity ===
The majority of the people of Eshtehard belong to the Tat and Azerbaijani ethnic group and they speak the Tati language and Azerbaijani.

=== Population ===
At the time of the 2006 National Census, the city's population was 16,988 in 4,813 households, when it was the capital of the former Eshtehard District in Karaj County, Tehran province. The 2016 census measured the population of the city as 29,993 inhabitants in 9,357 households, by which time the county had been separated from the province in the establishment of Alborz province.

In 2012, the district was separated from the county in establishing Eshtehard County, and Eshtehard was transferred to the new Central District as the county's capital.

== Attractions ==
Main attractions include Eshtehard Industrial Town and the University of Payam-e Nur—Eshtehard Unit.

== See also ==
Media related to Eshtehard at Wikimedia Commons

Eshtehard travel guide from Wikivoyage
