= Qaflankuh-e Sharqi Rural District =

Rural district in East Azerbaijan province, Iran

Qaflankuh-e Sharqi Rural District Persian: دهستان قافلانكوه شرقي
- Rural District
- Location within Iran
- Coordinates: 37°17′N 47°56′E
- Country: Iran
- Province: East Azerbaijan
- County: Mianeh
- District: Kaghazkonan
- Established: 1987
- Capital: Chowlaqlu

Population (2016)
  - Total: 2,573
- Time zone: UTC+3:30 (IRST)

Qaflankuh-e Sharqi Rural District (Persian: دهستان قافلانكوه شرقي) is in Kaghazkonan District of Mianeh County, East Azerbaijan province, Iran. Its capital is the village of Chowlaqlu.

== Demographics ==
=== Population ===
At the time of the 2006 National Census, the rural district's population was 3,274 in 911 households. There were 2,744 inhabitants in 884 households at the following census of 2011. The 2016 census measured the population of the rural district as 2,573 in 926 households. The most populous of its 19 villages was Allahlu, with 640 people.

=== Other villages in the rural district ===
- Ahmadabad-e Garus
- Baghjeghaz-e Olya
- Goltappeh-ye Hasanabad
- Qusheh Bolagh
