= Kaghazkonan-e Markazi Rural District =

Rural district in East Azerbaijan province, Iran

Kaghazkonan-e Markazi Rural District Persian: دهستان کاغذکنان مرکزي
- Rural District
- Location within Iran
- Coordinates: 37°16′N 48°08′E
- Country: Iran
- Province: East Azerbaijan
- County: Mianeh
- District: Kaghazkonan
- Established: 1987
- Capital: Aqkand

Population (2016)
  - Total: 2,038
- Time zone: UTC+3:30 (IRST)

Kaghazkonan-e Markazi Rural District (Persian: دهستان کاغذکنان مرکزي) is in Kaghazkonan District of Mianeh County, East Azerbaijan province, Iran. It is administered from the city of Aqkand.

== Demographics ==
=== Population ===
At the time of the 2006 National Census, the rural district's population was 2,186 in 641 households. There were 1,930 inhabitants in 639 households at the following census of 2011. The 2016 census measured the population of the rural district as 2,038 in 720 households. The most populous of its 27 villages was Astanjin, with 255 people.

=== Other villages in the rural district ===
- Gav
- Mendejin
- Shirin Bolagh
