= Central District (Eshtehard County) =

District in Alborz province, Iran

Central District (Eshtehard County) Persian: بخش مرکزی شهرستان اشتهارد
- District
- Location within Iran
- Coordinates: 35°42′N 50°18′E
- Country: Iran
- Province: Alborz
- County: Eshtehard
- Established: 2012
- Capital: Eshtehard

Population (2016)
  - Total: 35,250
- Time zone: UTC+3:30 (IRST)

The Central District of Eshtehard County (Persian: بخش مرکزی شهرستان اشتهارد) is in Alborz province, Iran. Its capital is the city of Eshtehard.

== History ==
In 2010, Karaj County was separated from Tehran province in the establishment of Alborz province.

In 2012, Eshtehard District was separated from the county in establishing Eshtehard County, which was divided into two districts of two rural districts each, with Eshtehard as its capital and only city at the time.

== Demographics ==
=== Population ===
At the time of the 2016 National Census, the district's population was 35,250 in 10,911 households.

=== Administrative divisions ===
Central District (Eshtehard County) Population
Administrative Divisions	2016
Eypak RD	1,854
Sehatabad RD	3,403
Eshtehard (city)	29,993
Total	35,250
RD = Rural District
