= Haftkel District =

Former district in Khuzestan province, Iran

Haftkel District Persian: بخش هفتکل
- Former District
- Location within Iran
- Coordinates: 31°33′N 49°27′E
- Country: Iran
- Province: Khuzestan
- County: Ramhormoz
- Capital: Haftkel

Population (2006)
  - Total: 22,633
- Time zone: UTC+3:30 (IRST)

Haftkel District (Persian: بخش هفتکل) is a former administrative division of Ramhormoz County, Khuzestan province, Iran. Its capital was the city of Haftkel.

== History ==
After the 2006 National Census, the district was separated from the county in the establishment of Haftkel County.

== Demographics ==
=== Population ===
At the time of the 2006 census, the district's population was 22,633 in 4,711 households.

=== Administrative divisions ===
Haftkel District Population
Administrative Divisions	2006
Gazin RD	5,352
Haftkel RD (Note: Renamed Howmeh Rural District)	2,546
Haftkel (city)	14,735
Total	22,633
RD = Rural District
