= Kaghazkonan-e Shomali Rural District =

Rural district in East Azerbaijan province, Iran

Kaghazkonan-e Shomali Rural District Persian: دهستان کاغذکنان شمالي
- Rural District
- Location within Iran
- Coordinates: 37°24′N 48°05′E
- Country: Iran
- Province: East Azerbaijan
- County: Mianeh
- District: Kaghazkonan
- Established: 1987
- Capital: Qarah Bolagh

Population (2016)
  - Total: 3,216
- Time zone: UTC+3:30 (IRST)

Kaghazkonan-e Shomali Rural District (Persian: دهستان کاغذکنان شمالي) is in Kaghazkonan District of Mianeh County, East Azerbaijan province, Iran. Its capital is the village of Qarah Bolagh.

== Demographics ==
=== Population ===
At the time of the 2006 National Census, the rural district's population was 3,818 in 1,212 households. There were 2,959 inhabitants in 1,147 households at the following census of 2011. The 2016 census measured the population of the rural district as 3,216 in 1,226 households. The most populous of its 34 villages was Qarah Bolagh, with 865 people.

=== Other villages in the rural district ===
- Bahmanabad
- Kalyan
- Khvordeh Bolagh
- Yanbolagh
