= Howmeh Rural District (Haftkel County) =

Rural district in Khuzestan province, Iran

Howmeh Rural District Persian: دهستان حومه
- Rural District
- Location within Iran
- Coordinates: 31°30′20″N 49°30′45″E
- Country: Iran
- Province: Khuzestan
- County: Haftkel
- District: Central
- Capital: Jaru

Population (2016)
  - Total: 1,443
- Time zone: UTC+3:30 (IRST)

Howmeh Rural District (Persian: دهستان حومه) (Note: Formerly Haftkel Rural District (دهستان هفتکل)) is in the Central District of Haftkel County, Khuzestan province, Iran. Its capital is the village of Jaru.

== Demographics ==
=== Population ===
At the time of the 2006 National Census, the rural district's population (as Haftkel Rural District of the former Haftkel District of Ramhormoz County) was 2,546 in 510 households. There were 2,179 inhabitants in 482 households at the following census of 2011, by which time the district had been separated from the county in the establishment of Haftkel County. The rural district was transferred to the new Central District and renamed Howmeh Rural District. The 2016 census measured the population of the rural district as 1,443 in 395 households. The most populous of its 54 villages was Barm-e Gavmishi-ye Seh, with 857 people.
