= Palangabad District =

District in Alborz province, Iran

Palangabad District Persian: بخش پلنگ‌آباد
- District
- Location within Iran
- Coordinates: 35°44′N 50°36′E
- Country: Iran
- Province: Alborz
- County: Eshtehard
- Established: 2012
- Capital: Palangabad

Population (2016)
  - Total: 2,625
- Time zone: UTC+3:30 (IRST)

Palangabad District (Persian: بخش پلنگ‌آباد) is in Eshtehard County, Alborz province, Iran. Its capital is the city of Palangabad.

== History ==
In 2010, Karaj County was separated from Tehran province in the establishment of Alborz province.

In 2012, Eshtehard District was separated from the county in establishing Eshtehard County, which was divided into two districts of two rural districts each, with Eshtehard as its capital and only city at the time. The village of Palangabad was elevated to the status of a city in 2018.

== Demographics ==
=== Population ===
At the time of the 2016 census, the district's population was 2,625 in 819 households.

=== Administrative divisions ===
Palangabad District Population
Administrative Divisions	2016
Jaru RD	1,407
Palangabad RD	1,218
Palangabad (city) (Note: Became a city after the 2016 census)	
Total	2,625
RD = Rural District
