= Palangabad Rural District =

Rural district in Alborz province, Iran

Palangabad Rural District Persian: دهستان پلنگ‌آباد
- Rural District
- Location within Iran
- Coordinates: 35°44′N 50°39′E
- Country: Iran
- Province: Alborz
- County: Eshtehard
- District: Palangabad
- Capital: Palangabad

Population (2016)
  - Total: 1,218
- Time zone: UTC+3:30 (IRST)

Palangabad Rural District (Persian: دهستان پلنگ‌آباد) is in Palangabad District of Eshtehard County, Alborz province, Iran. It is administered from the city of Palangabad.

== Demographics ==
=== Population ===
At the time of the 2006 National Census, the rural district's population (as a part of the former Eshtehard District in Karaj County, Tehran province) was 6,613 people in 1,903 households. In 2010, the county was separated from the province in the establishment of Alborz province. In 2012, the district was separated from the county in establishing Eshtehard County, and the rural district was transferred to the new Palangabad District. The 2016 census measured the population of the rural district as 1,218 in 374 households. The most populous of its 11 villages was Palangabad (now a city), with 1,012 people.

=== Other villages in the rural district ===
- Jafarabad
- Naserabad
