= Central District (Haftkel County) =

District in Khuzestan province, Iran

Central District (Haftkel County) Persian: بخش مرکزی شهرستان هفتکل
- District
- Location within Iran
- Coordinates: 31°30′20″N 49°30′45″E
- Country: Iran
- Province: Khuzestan
- County: Haftkel
- Capital: Haftkel

Population (2016)
  - Total: 17,245
- Time zone: UTC+3:30 (IRST)

The Central District of Haftkel County (Persian: بخش مرکزی شهرستان هفتکل) is in Khuzestan province, Iran. Its capital is the city of Haftkel.

== History ==
After the National Census of 2006, Haftkel District was separated from Ramhormoz County in the establishment of Haftkel County, which was divided into two districts and three rural districts, with Haftkel as its capital and only city at the time.

== Demographics ==
=== Population ===
At the time of the 2011 census, the district's population was 17,056 people in 4,188 households. The 2016 census measured the population of the district as 17,245 inhabitants in 4,678 households.

=== Administrative divisions ===
Central District (Haftkel County) Population
Administrative Divisions	2011	2016
Howmeh RD (Note: Formerly Haftkel Rural District)	2,179	1,443
Haftkel (city)	14,877	15,802
Total	17,056	17,245
RD = Rural District
