= Eshtehard County =

County in Alborz province, Iran

Eshtehard County Persian: شهرستان اشتهارد
- County
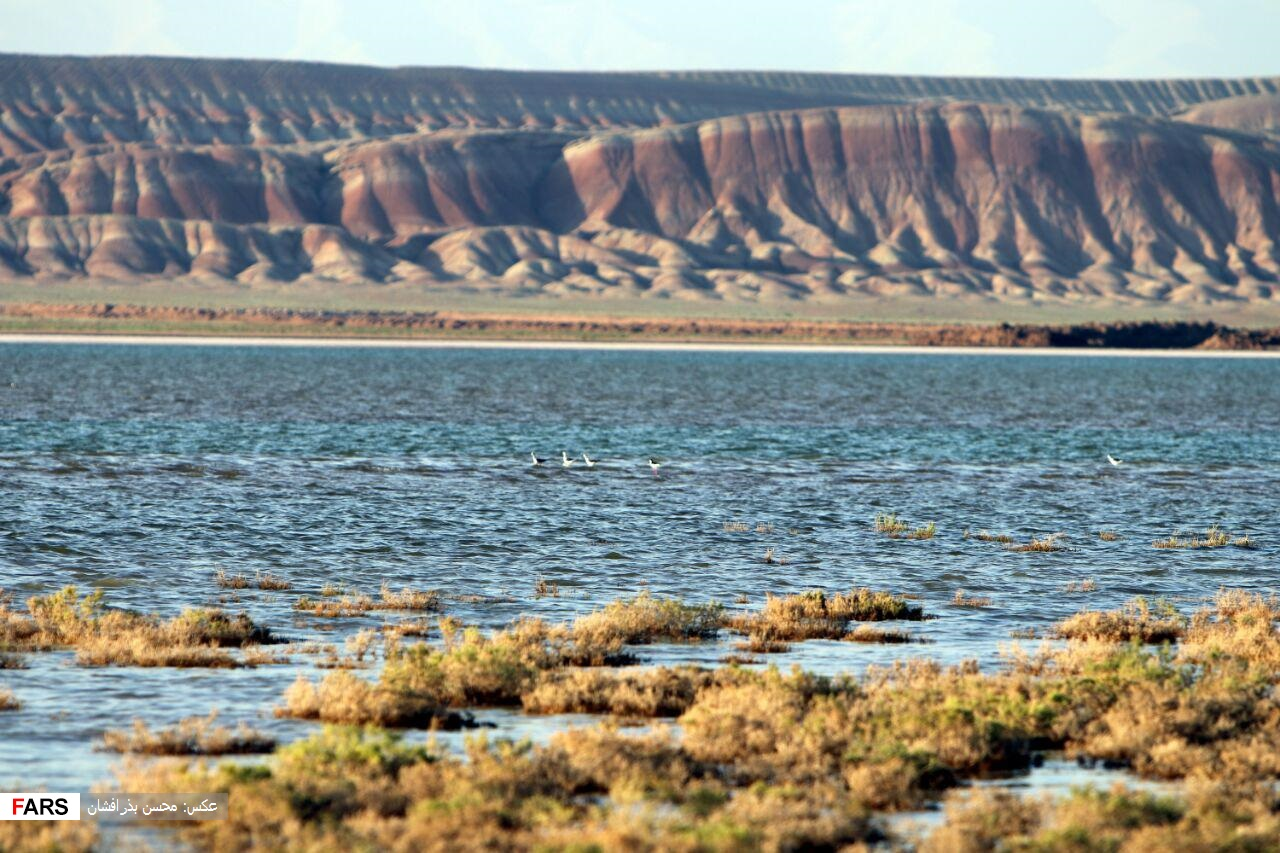
- Eshtehard Wetland

- Location of Eshtehard County in Alborz province (yellow)

- Location of Alborz province in Iran
- Coordinates: 35°41′N 50°27′E
- Country: Iran
- Province: Alborz
- Established: 2012
- Capital: Eshtehard
- Districts: Central, Palangabad

Area
  - Total: 843 km^{2} (325 sq mi)

Population (2016)
  - Total: 37,876
  - Density: 44.9/km^{2} (116/sq mi)
- Time zone: UTC+3:30 (IRST)

Eshtehard County (Persian: شهرستان اشتهارد) (Note: Also romanized as Ŝahrestān-e Eŝtāhārd) is in Alborz province, Iran. Its capital is the city of Eshtehard.

== History ==
In 2010, Karaj County was separated from Tehran province in the establishment of Alborz province.

In 2012, Eshtehard District was separated from the county in establishing Eshtehard County, which was divided into two districts of two rural districts each, with Eshtehard as its capital and only city at the time. The village of Palangabad was converted to a city in 2018.

== Demographics ==
=== Population ===
At the time of the 2016 National Census, the population of the county was 37,876 in 11,731 households.

=== Administrative divisions ===
Eshtehard County's population and administrative structure are shown in the following table.

Eshtehard County Population
Administrative Divisions	2016
Central District	35,250
Eypak RD	1,854
Sehatabad RD	3,403
Eshtehard (city)	29,993
Palangabad District	2,625
Jaru RD	1,407
Palangabad RD	1,218
Palangabad (city) (Note: Became a city after the 2016 census)	
Total	37,876
RD = Rural District

== See also ==
Media related to Eshtehard County at Wikimedia Commons
