= Raghiveh District =

District in Khuzestan province, Iran

Raghiveh District Persian: بخش رغیوه
- District
- Location within Iran
- Coordinates: 31°32′38″N 49°19′21″E
- Country: Iran
- Province: Khuzestan
- County: Haftkel
- Capital: Raghiveh

Population (2016)
  - Total: 4,874
- Time zone: UTC+3:30 (IRST)

Raghiveh District (Persian: بخش رغیوه) is in Haftkel County, Khuzestan province, Iran. Its capital is the city of Raghiveh.

== History ==
After the 2006 National Census, Haftkel District was separated from Ramhormoz County in the establishment of Haftkel County, which was divided into two districts and three rural districts, with Haftkel as its capital and only city at the time.

After the 2016 census, the village of Raghiveh was elevated to the status of a city.

== Demographics ==
=== Population ===
At the time of the 2011 census, the district's population was 5,242 people in 1,197 households. The 2016 census measured the population of the district as 4,874 inhabitants in 1,230 households.

=== Administrative divisions ===
Raghiveh District Population
Administrative Divisions	2011	2016
Gazin Rural District	1,355	1,135
Raghiveh Rural District	3,887	3,739
Raghiveh (city) (Note: Became a city after the 2016 census)		
Total	5,242	4,874
RD = Rural District
