= Gazin Rural District =

Rural district in Khuzestan province, Iran

Gazin Rural District Persian: دهستان گزين
- Rural District
- Location within Iran
- Coordinates: 31°35′38″N 49°20′32″E
- Country: Iran
- Province: Khuzestan
- County: Haftkel
- District: Raghiveh
- Capital: Gazin

Population (2016)
  - Total: 1,135
- Time zone: UTC+3:30 (IRST)

Gazin Rural District (Persian: دهستان گزين) is in Raghiveh District of Haftkel County, Khuzestan province, Iran. Its capital is the village of Gazin.

== Demographics ==
=== Population ===
At the time of the 2006 National Census, the rural district's population (as part of the former Haftkel District of Ramhormoz County) was 5,352 in 1,048 households. There were 1,355 inhabitants in 372 households at the following census of 2011, by which time the district had been separated from the county in the establishment of Haftkel County. The rural district was transferred to the new Raghiveh District. The 2016 census measured the population of the rural district as 1,135 in 298 households. The most populous of its 37 villages was Naft Sefid, with 406 people.
