= Eshtehard District =

Former district in Tehran province, Iran

Eshtehard District Persian: بخش اشتهارد
- Former District
- Location within Iran
- Coordinates: 35°41′N 50°27′E
- Country: Iran
- Province: Alborz
- County: Karaj
- Capital: Eshtehard

Population (2006)
  - Total: 23,601
- Time zone: UTC+3:30 (IRST)

Eshtehard District (Persian: بخش اشتهارد) is a former administrative division of Karaj County, Alborz province, Iran. Its capital was the city of Eshtehard.

== History ==
In 2010, the county separated from Tehran province in the establishment of Alborz province. The district was separated from the county in the establishment of Eshtehard County in 2012.

== Demographics ==
=== Population ===
At the time of the 2006 National Census, the district's population was 23,601 in 6,716 households.

=== Administrative divisions ===
Eshtehard District Population
Administrative Divisions	2006
Palangabad RD	6,613
Eshtehard (city)	16,988
Total	23,601
RD = Rural District
