= Haftkel County =

County in Khuzestan province, Iran

Haftkel County Persian: شهرستان هفتکل
- County
- Location of Haftkel County in Khuzestan province (center, green)

- Location of Khuzestan province in Iran
- Coordinates: 31°33′N 49°27′E
- Country: Iran
- Province: Khuzestan
- Capital: Haftkel
- Districts: Central, Raghiveh

Population (2016)
  - Total: 22,119
- Time zone: UTC+3:30 (IRST)

Haftkel County (Persian: شهرستان هفتکل) is in Khuzestan province, Iran. Its capital is the city of Haftkel.

== History ==
After the 2006 National Census, Haftkel District was separated from Ramhormoz County in the establishment of Haftkel County, which was divided into two districts and three rural districts, with Haftkel as its capital and only city at the time.

After the 2016 census, the village of Raghiveh was elevated to the status of a city.

== Demographics ==
=== Population ===
At the time of the 2011 census, the county's population was 22,391 people in 5,387 households. The 2016 census measured the population of the county as 22,119 in 5,908 households.

=== Administrative divisions ===
Haftkel County's population history and administrative structure over two consecutive censuses are shown in the following table.

Haftkel County Population
| Administrative Divisions | 2011 | 2016 |
|---|---|---|
| Central District | 17,056 | 17,245 |
| Howmeh RD (Note: Formerly Haftkel Rural District) | 2,179 | 1,443 |
| Haftkel (city) | 14,877 | 15,802 |
| Raghiveh District | 5,242 | 4,874 |
| Gazin RD | 1,355 | 1,135 |
| Raghiveh RD | 3,887 | 3,739 |
| Raghiveh (city) (Note: Became a city after the 2016 census) | | |
| Total | 22,391 | 22,119 |
RD = Rural District

== See also ==
Media related to Haftkel County at Wikimedia Commons
