= Kaghazkonan District =

District in East Azerbaijan province, Iran

Kaghazkonan District Persian: بخش کاغذکنان
- District
- Location within Iran
- Coordinates: 37°19′N 48°05′E
- Country: Iran
- Province: East Azerbaijan
- County: Mianeh
- Capital: Aqkand

Population (2016)
  - Total: 10,729
- Time zone: UTC+3:30 (IRST)

Kaghazkonan District (Persian: بخش کاغذکنان) is in Mianeh County, East Azerbaijan province, Iran. Its capital is the city of Aqkand.

== Demographics ==
=== Population ===
At the time of the 2006 National Census, the district's population was 11,101 in 3,241 households. The following census in 2011 counted 9,366 people in 3,214 households. The 2016 census measured the population of the district as 10,729 inhabitants in 3,785 households.

=== Administrative divisions ===
Kaghazkonan District Population
Administrative Divisions	2006	2011	2016
Kaghazkonan-e Markazi RD	2,186	1,930	2,038
Kaghazkonan-e Shomali RD	3,818	2,959	3,216
Qaflankuh-e Sharqi RD	3,274	2,744	2,573
Aqkand (city)	1,823	1,733	2,902
Total	11,101	9,366	10,729
RD = Rural District
