= Yengi Kand =

Yengi Kand or Yangi Kand or Yengikand or Yangikend (Persian: ينگي كند), also rendered as Yengeh Kand, may refer to:

- Yengi Kand, Hashtrud, East Azerbaijan Province
- Yengi Kand, Meyaneh, East Azerbaijan Province
- Yengi Kand, Garmeh-ye Jonubi, Meyaneh County, East Azerbaijan Province
- Yengi Kand, Tabriz, East Azerbaijan Province
- Yengikand-e Khaneh-ye Barq, East Azerbaijan Province
- Yengikand-e Khusheh Mehr, East Azerbaijan Province
- Yengi Kand, Hamadan
- Yengi Kand, Bijar, Kurdistan Province
- Yengikand, Chang Almas, Bijar County, Kurdistan Province
- Yengi Kand, Divandarreh, Kurdistan Province
- Yangi Kand, Qazvin
- Yengi Kand, Bukan, West Azerbaijan Province
- Yengi Kand, Miandoab, West Azerbaijan Province
- Yengi Kand, Takab, West Azerbaijan Province
- Yengi Kand, Zanjan
- Yengi Kand-e Almasi, Zanjan Province
- Yengi Kand-e Jame ol Sara, Zanjan Province
- Yengi Kand-e Kandesaha, Zanjan Province
- Yengi Kand-e Seyyedlar, Zanjan Province
