= Kho'ini dialect =

Indo-Iranian language

Kho'ini
- Di
- Die Zuan دیه زواَن
- Pronunciation: [xo.iːniː]
- Native to: Iran
- Region: Ejarud, Zanjan province
- Language family: Indo-European: Indo-Iranian; Iranian; Western; Northwestern II; Tatic; Kho'ini

Language codes
- ISO 639-3: xkc
- Glottolog: khoi1250
- ELP: Kho'ini

Kho'ini (alternatives: Xoini, Xo'ini, Khoeini, or Di) is a Tatic dialect or language spoken in northwestern Iran, and is one of many Western Iranian languages. It is spoken in the village of Xoin and surrounding areas, about 60 kilometres (37 mi) southwest of Zanjan city in northern Iran. The Xoini verbal system follows the general pattern found in other Tati dialects. However, the dialect has its own special characteristics such as continuous present which is formed by the past stem, a preverb shift, and the use of connective sounds. The dialect is in danger of extinction.

== Kho'in ==
Kho'in (Persian: خوئین), also spelled as Xo'in an Khoein, is located in "Ejarud" rural district of Zanjan Province at the end of a long valley. In recent decades the village has lost its centrality because of veering the road of Zanjan to Bijar from Xoin. In 1960, the farmers was growing fruits around on the slopes of the hills, however, Xoin's Qanats were neglected; many of the houses deteriorated already and a number of inhabitants had been migrating to Tehran seeking works. The population was 800 to 900 at the time and declining.

There has been a sense of nostalgia about the better days of Xo'in among the dwellers. Local beliefs hold that in the Qajar period some Xoinis emigrated to Merv, Ashgabat and Baku. There is a cavernous dent called "Dei-manda", meaning, "remnant of a fort" (known in other parts of Iran as "Qaleh Gabri/Gowri"), said to have been made by Zoroastrians. Some villagers legendarily believed that Xoinis had earlier been Gowr. They gave credence to being originally from Sistan. Some said when Bahman invaded Sistan to avenge his father, Esfandiyar, the descendants of Rostam fled and came to Xoin. In spite of dwindling estate, the village has 8 maintained mosques and a Tekyeh.

== Geography ==
Azeri Turkic has mostly replaced Xoini, however in the 1960s, the extent of the dialect was as follows:

- Sipkamar (Persian: "Sefidkamar"): It is a village to the west of Xoin. The dialect was best preserved there. It had some 70 households in 1963. Sefidkamar has been more flourishing than Xoin. The access road is rather doubly arduous and limits communications, which may have been instrumental in the dialect's survival.
- Xoin: Azerbaijani language is the predominant language and the indigenous dialect was fading away in 1960 and might be extinct by now. In Aruz Mâla, the northern quarter of Xoin, the dialect is somewhat better known than in Aš Mâla, the southern quarter, where almost no one knows the language any longer.
- Sa'idabad: In its lower quarter, they speak mostly the dialect.
- Garneh: A couple of kilometers from Xoin. The people speak the dialect.
- Sura: A village to the east of Xoin, which had some 250 inhabitants. Some knew the dialect.
- Balubin (Persian: "Balbavin"): The dialect is spoken side by side with Turkic.
- Halab: The language had practically disappeared, being replaced by Azerbaijani. Just one old man could remember a few sentences in 1960.

== Phonology ==
Some sounds are approximate. Some of the vowels such as "e, â, o, u" and "i" show variations.

Monophthongs
| Sound (IPA) | Notes | Romanization | Example(s) |
|---|---|---|---|
| ɒ | generally a somewhat rounded /ɔ/ | â | âynakâ |
| æ | - | a | tar |
| e | - | e | âme |
| o | has a wide range between /u/ and /ɔ/. It could be an allophone of /ɒ/ or /u/. | o | xorâk |
| u | - | u | buri |
| y | probably not a separate phoneme. The palatalization may be a Turkic influence. | ü | dü, mü, lüt |
| œ | a phoneme or an allophone of /o/ or /u/ | ö | höröm, čöröl |
| i | - | i | pir |

The consonants are: p, b, t, d, č, j, k, g, x, xʷ, q, f, m, n, r, l, s, z, ž, š, h, v, w, y.

Notes about some Consonants
| Sound (IPA) | Notes | Romanization | Example(s) |
|---|---|---|---|
| k | Final /k/, following a vowel is mostly pronounced as /g/ and as in the 3rd. person singular suffix, begins as a half-voiced stop and ends as a fricative /x/. | k | xorâk, nedârek |
| ʒ | /ʒ/ is a rare sound. | ž | žani, gužd |
| m,n | Final /m/ and /n/ after a vowel (particularly /ɒ/ )are tending to merely nasalize the preceding vowel. For example, in the 1st person plural person suffix: -ɒm/-ɒ̆̆ / | m, n | merdân |
| w | is infrequent. After some vowels it can be considered as diphthong. Generally in most of the cases it is dropped or can be considered as a buffer or a semivowel. | w | wâ (consonant), ^{w}uj-, uwâ |
| j | /j/ can appear in all parts of the words | y | yem |
| x | In a number of words it is followed by a weak /w/ or /u/ without making any changes in the syllabic count of the word. Whether x^{u} should be counted as a separate consonant or should be considered in such words as x^{u}an a contraction of xua is moot. | x | x^{u}an (or xwan), xalâw. |
| ʋ | - | v | vel |

In Xoini, vowel harmony, gemination and lengthening more or less occurs.

== Grammar ==
=== Nouns and adjectives ===
Nouns have two cases: direct and oblique. Contrary to the often case in Persian, adjective is not Post-positive. The formation of different kinds of nouns and adjectives and their order are as follows:

Nouns and adjectives
| Formation and notes | Example(s) | Persian | English |
|---|---|---|---|
| Abstract noun: adjective + a stressed -i | gallawân → gallawâni | čupân → čupâni | shepherd → shepherding |
| adjective + -a/-e + noun | süjesta kömer; tara nun | suxte zoqâl; nâne tâze (tar) | burned coal; fresh bread |
| Izafat is reversed comparing to Persian | ast-e mezg | maqz-e ostoxân | bone marrow |
| Substantive adjective: -âr + present stem of the verb | pül âdâ-r-âr | pul dahande | money giver |
| Adjective: noun + -in | gulek- (lower part) → gulgin lavenj | labe pâyin | lower lip |
| Adjective: present stem + -ganin | enta:ganin | âšâmidani | drinkable |
| Adjective: -jul | kermajul-e (or possibly: kermaj (wormy) + -ul + e) | kerm-ur-e (kerm-var-e) | (It) is wormy |
| Adjective relating a person to a place or a language: -ej | diej; spekamarej | di-gu; sefidkamar-i | Di (Xoini) speaker; Sefidkamari |

=== Pronouns ===
Pronouns
| | Singular | | | Plural |
| Person | 1 | 2 | 3 | 1 | 2 | 3 |
|---|---|---|---|---|---|---|
| Nominative | az | te | a(v) | mâ | šemâ | ân |
| Oblique | man | te | â | mâ | šemâ | ân |
| Possessive | če-man | eš-te | č-a | če-mâ(n) | še-mâ(n) | č-ân |

The possessive pronouns are also used with both preposition and postposition, e.g.:

- a:râ buri čeman ku pül ar-gi (tomorrow come (and) take money from me). čeman ku means "from me"
- de man panir a-čman xarat-(e)š-e (he sold two maunds of cheese to me). a-čman means "to me"

They are acted as possessive adjectives too:

- čeman da:s-em begi (take my hand). Note that the pronoun is repeated by the clitic -em.

Demonstrative pronouns
| | Nominative | Accusative | Oblique |
|---|---|---|---|
Proximate
| Singular | em | eme | čia/čie, čem |
| Plural | eme | emân | čiân |
Remote
| Singular | a(v) | ave | ča/čâ |
| Plural | ave | avân | čân |

For example:

- čia ku (from this),
- čâ ku (from that).

They serve also as adjectives:

- čiân/čân daste begi (take these/those ones' hands)
- čie/čâ daste begi (take this/that one's hand)

Possession is also expressed by adding suffixes to nouns. These are added after inflection for number. See the "Person Suffixes" table below.

Reflexive pronoun: geg. But it is treated as a noun in terms of declension, e.g.:

- mâ a gege-mân viar seg-mân či (we piled stones in front of ourselves).

=== Verbs ===
The verbal system follows the general pattern found in other Tati dialects. It employs:

- A present and a past stem
- Personal suffixes
- preverbs: â-, (âje-), ar-, baʋ-/ʋaʋ-, bay/ʋay-, či-, da(r)-, dari-, pa(r)-, ^{w}ut-
- Negative Marker: ne-
- Prohibitive Marker: ma-
- Subjunctive/Imperative prefix: be-
- Imperfective: -in-/-en-/-m-
- Insistence, necessity, volition: pi-; e.g.: te pi niši (you must not go)
- Desire, need: pi-sta-; e.g.: pist-am/pista-r-im bešum (I want to go)

However, the main exceptional characteristics of Xoini are:

1. Continuous present is made by the past stem;
2. The preverbs shift their positions depending on tense and mood;
3. The use of a connective sound is frequent. It is generally -r- and sometimes -y-, when the vowels of the different elements of a verb come into contact. For example: mesar te nâza-r-â-m-bim (this year you will become well).

Person Suffixes
| Person | Singular | Plural |
|---|---|---|
| 1st | -(e)m | -mân |
| 2nd | -i (-y after a vowel) | -yân |
| 3rd | -(e)š | -(e)šân |

The above suffixes serve as:

1. Possessives, e.g.: berâ-m âmi (My brother came).
2. Agents of past transitive verbs in an ergative construction, e.g.: te ow-i ente (You drank water).
3. Objects, direct or indirect, e.g.: ü seg-ešân p(e)tow-šân kay (They threw a stone).

The suffixes may be attached to the verb; the agent of the verb in an ergative construction; an adverb; a prepositional or postpositional phrase; and in a compound verb to its nominal Complement.

The same set of endings is used for the present and the subjunctive. The endings of the preterit and the present perfect are basically the enclitic present forms of the verb 'to be' (*ah-, here called base one). For pluperfect and subjunctive perfect the freestanding auxiliary verb 'to be' (*bav-, here called base two) is utilized. There is no ending for singular imperative and it is -ân for plural. For the inflections of "to be" see "Auxiliary inflection" below.

==== Conjugations ====
===== Stems and imperative mood =====
The past and present stems are irregular and shaped by historical developments, e.g.: ^{w}uj- / ^{w}ut- (to say); xaraš-/xarat- (to sell); taj-/tat- (to run). However, in many verbs the past stem is built on the present stem by adding -(e)st; e.g.: brem- → bremest- (to weep).

The imperative is formed by the modal prefix be- if the verb contains no preverb, plus the present stem and without ending in the singular and with -ân in the plural. be- is often changed to bi-, bo- or bu- according to the situation, and appears as b- before a vowel of a verbal stem.

===== Active voice =====
Active Voice
| Form | Tense | Notes | Example(s) |
|---|---|---|---|
| Infinitive | - | past stem + -e | dakošt-e (to put out) |
| Indicative | Present | present stem + personal endings | taj-em (I run) |
| „ | Preterite of intransitive verbs | past stem (the stress falling on the last syllable of it) + the present tense of "to be" (which is personal endings) | verit-im (I ran) |
| „ | Preterite of transitive verbs | The same as above except that normally it is put in the 3rd person singular whether its object, which is put in the direct case, is singular or plural. | Example with enclitic pronouns as agent: vind-em(e) (I saw) |
| „ | Perfect of intransitive verbs | past participle (generally made of the past stem plus a stressed -a-) + the present tense of "to be" | tânesta-r-im (I have been able) |
| „ | Perfect of transitive verbs | past participle + a suffix pronoun as agent + -e (the 3rd person singular of the present tense of "to be") | vind-a-m-e (I have seen) |
| „ | Imperfective perfect of intransitive verbs | 1) past stem + the present tense of "to be". 2) The affix en-/in-/em- + past stem (seems to show imperfectivity). | 1) še-m (I used to go). 2) em-kak (he used to do); xuand-em-e (I used to say) |
| „ | Imperfective perfect of intransitive verbs | The same as "1)" above except that enclitic pronouns are added as the agents of the verb either before the stem or after it. | harru ... xwand-eg/xwand-em-eg (I would say ... everyday) |
| „ | Pluperfect | past participle + the preterit of "to be" | rast-a b-im (I had reached) |
| „ | Imperfective pluperfect | verb's Past tense + the perfect of "to be" (Actance) | berembeste dar-e biak (had been crying) -the informant has been absent- |
| „ | Future | similar to Present of intransitives | ra:s-ek (he will arrive) |
| „ | Present progressive | past stem + stressed -a (appears to be a past participle) + the present tense of "to be" | xarat-a-r-im (I am selling, lit.: I am seller) |
| „ | Preterite progressive | past stem + stressed -a + the preterit of "to be" | arga:ta b-im (I was taking) |
| Subjunctive | Present | be- (unless a preverb is contained) + present stem + personal endings | be-ttaj-em ((that) I run) |
| „ | Perfect | past participle + the subjunctive of "to be" | agar az ša:-bum (if I should have gone) (Persian: rafte bâšam) |
| Optative | present | subjunctive is used | xodâ ešte omr be-d-ek (may God give you (long) life) |
| Conditional | present | subjunctive is used | aga az bettajem nengem šigek (if I run my leg will break) |

===== Passive and causative =====
| Form | Notes | Example(s) |
|---|---|---|
| Passive | The passive stem: present stem + -(e)st | šur-est-e (was washed); â-kar-est-i/karesti-â/karesti-râ (had been opened, lit.: has been opened); xuar-est-i (has been eaten) |
| Causative | present stem + -en or -jen | bekejer! (laugh!) → bekejer-en! (make laugh!); betta(j)! (run!) → bettâ-jen! (make run!, gallop!) |

===== Auxiliary inflection =====
The conjugation of the verb 'to be' uses two different bases; historically one from the root *ah- and the other from the root *bav-.

Conjugation of "to be"
| Form | Tense | Conjugation | Notes |
|---|---|---|---|
| Infinitive | - | be | - |
| Imperative | - | bebe (sing.); bebuin (pl.) | from the root *bav- and follows the general rule |
| Indicative | Present | im, iš, e; âm, ân, end | After e and â, the e of the 3rd person singular changes to y. e.g. te-yš (you are (sing.)) |
| „ | Preterite | bim, biš, be; biyâm, biyân, bend | the past stem of *bav- + the endings taken from the base one of "to be" |
| „ | Imperfective preterite | harvax za:m bustek (whenever it became/was sore); az harvax nâwxaš bustim (whenever I became/was ill) | the secondary participle in -ste of "to be + the present of "to be" (base one) (i.e. personal endings) |
| „ | Perfect | biyam, biay, biak; biayâm, biayân, biaynd | the participle bia of base two + the present of "to be" from the base one. |
| „ | Pluperfect | bia bim, bia biš, bia be; bia biâm, bia biân, bia bend. | the participle of the base two + the preterit of the same verb as auxiliary |
| Subjunctive | Present | bebum, bebi^{n}, bebu(k); bebiâm, bebiân, bebunda | the present stem of *bav- + the verbal prefix be- with the endings: -m, -i^{n}, -k, -âm, -ân, -nda. Sometimes the prefix be- is omitted, |

The present from the root *bav- is the present of "to become" which is from the same root with the addition of the preverb â- and the imperfective prefix (e)m-, thus: â-m-bum, â-m-bin, â-m-buk; â-m-biâm, â-m-biân â-m-bend (I become, you become, etc.). So it doesn't mean "to be".

There is another form, hest- which occurs in the sense of "to be, to exist": hest-im, hest-iš, hest-e; hest-im, hest-iân, hest-end.

== Particles ==
Prepositions, postpositions and the conjunction "and" of Xoini are as follows:

Particles
| Particle | Example | Persian | English |
|---|---|---|---|
| a (to) | xerdege seg-eš darderare a xumme. | Bačče sang râ miandâzad be xomre. | The child throws stone at the (large earthen) jar. |
| â (to) | â fekr-em âmi. | be fekram âmad. | It came to my mind. |
| da (to) | pase neng-eš da dar bend. | Lenge gusfand râ be dâr beband. | Tie the sheep's foot to the tree! |
| ta (with) | xâwey ta gigay beba. | xâharat râ bâ xodat bebar. | Take your sister with you! |
| avi (without) | avi ačman maš | bi man maro (mašo)! | Don't go without me! |
| bi (without) | bi berâ maš. | bi barâdar maro (mašo). | Don't go without (your) brother. |
| pa (on) | pa tantanan sar ne | ruye sare ham neh. | Pile (or lay) on top of each other! |
| viar (in front of) | mâ a gege-mân viar seg-mân či. | mâ dar jelowe-mân sang čidim. | We piled stones in front of ourselves. |
| -da(r) (in) | daryâye lavenj-da čadereš žay | (dar) labe daryâ čâdoraš râ bepâ kard | He has pitched his tent at the edge of the sea. |
| -ku (from) | čeman-ku xabar magi! | az man xabar magir (mapors)! | Do not ask me! |
| -tan (from) | va-tan âmayma terân. | az ânjâ âmadeam tehrân. | I have come from there to Tehran. |
| -da (from) | vela-da tuma bigi | toxmhâ râ az gol begir | Take seeds from the flower. |
| -(r)â (for) | yem galân-â pa:n karek. | râš râ barâye gale pahn kard. | He spreads fodder for the flock. |
| o (and) | nun o ow âjade â jem faqire | nân o (va) âb bede be in faqire. | Give bread and water to this poor (fellow)! |

== Turkic influence ==
Xoini has been impacted by Turkic Azeri to some extent. That includes borrowing a number of verbal forms, for example: -miš which is attached to the past stem of some verbs to form a verbal noun, e.g., ^{w}ut-miš (saying). The postposition, -da (from) seems to be Turkic. There exist also a number words e.g.: düz (straight, right).

== Vocabulary and example sentences ==
| English | Xoini | Persian | Example sentence | English |
|---|---|---|---|---|
| big | pilla | bozorg (pil) | em kay pilli | This house is big. |
| bring (v) | ^{w}uare | âvardan | ^{w}uar-ek | He brings. |
| brother | berâ | barâdar | berâ-y nâmi | Your brother did not come. |
| come (v) | âme/owme/o:me | âmadan | agar angâ bubum mâm | If I should be here, I will come. |
| cry (v) | bereme | geristan | xorde beremasta-r-e | The child is crying |
| day | ru | ruz | moru nürüja paši pistarim bešum | Today afternoon I want to go |
| do (v) | kaye | kardan | te čekâra kay'da-r-iš? | What are you doing? |
| door | bar | dar | moru hüš bare ka-y(r)ar-e? | Have you today closed the door at all? |
| eat (v) | xuae | xordan | nun xuay-dar-im | I am in (the act of) eating bread |
| eye | gelgân | češm | xodâ gelgân-i sibi bevendâ(r)neg | may God turn your eyes white (i.e., may you lose sight) |
| father | piar | pedar | xodâ piar-eš rahmat bekarek | May God show mercy to his father. |
| fire | âtaš | âtaš | âtaš daš-kaye | to kindle fire |
| good | nâza | xub | pa:ta xorâk čie-râ nâza nigi | Cooked food is not good for him (lit.: this one). |
| house | kay | xâne | mâ kay-mân na-xarata-mân | we have not sold our house. |
| laugh (v) | kejer | xandidan | te tanga omri da hüš kejerestayš | Till now, have you ever laughed in your life? |
| mother | mâ | mâdar | mâyem ^{w}ujem | I will tell my mother. |
| open (v) | kare/kar-âje | gošudan | xurdek kay da ništa be, vindeš divâr kareste-r-âje | The child was sitting in the house (when) he saw the wall was cracked open. |
| paddy | čaltuk | čaltuk | bav-šân-est-a(g) čaltuk hani nembu jam-kay | one can any longer gather scattered rice. |
| place | laka | jâ | em laka a laka tafâvot nedârek | This place (or) that place makes no difference. |
| read (v) | xuande/xwand | xândan | bavandân-da az harru xuanda ^{w}ut-m-išt-im, dasnamâz-em gat-e-par-e, namâzema xuand-em-e xalaw-em da:-m-en-kak gerava-m da:menkak še-ma wâjâr | In those times I used to rise from sleep, make ablution, say my prayers, would put on my clothes, would put on my socks (and) would go to the market. |
| say (v) | ^{w}uje/^{w}ute | goftan | nemâz-eš en-^{w}uj-ek | (every day) he says his prayers. |
| sister | xow/xâw | xâhar | em kâqe xowem berâsen | Make reach (deliver) this letter to my sister. |
| water | ow | âb/ow | parsâr ow-ni-mon darde/owmon nedard | Last year we did not have water. |
| woman | žani | zan | em žani nâzi | This woman is good. |
| yesterday | zir | diruz/di | az zir va bim te n-âmayš | I was there yesterday (but) you did not come (lit.: have not come). |
