= Yengi Kandi =

Yengi Kandi (Persian: ينگي كندي) may refer to:

- Yengi Kandi, Hashtrud, East Azerbaijan Province
- Yengi Kandi, Meyaneh, East Azerbaijan Province
- Yengi Kandi, Kaghazkonan, Meyaneh County, East Azerbaijan Province
- Yengi Kandi, Tabriz, East Azerbaijan Province
- Yengi Kandi, Kurdistan
