= Arkowyen =

Arkowyen or Arkovin or Arkevin or Arkavin (Persian: اركوين) may refer to:

- Arkowyen, Markazi
- Arkavin, West Azerbaijan
- Arkowyen, Zanjan
