= Ijrud =

Ijrud (Persian: ایجرود) may refer to:

- Ijrud County
- Ijrud-e Bala Rural District
- Ijrud-e Pain Rural District
