= Pasha Chay =

Village in Zanjan province, Iran

Pasha Chay Persian: پاشاچاي
- Village
- Location within Iran
- Coordinates: 36°22′40″N 47°59′24″E
- Country: Iran
- Province: Zanjan
- County: Ijrud
- District: Halab
- Rural District: Ijrud-e Pain

Population (2016)
  - Total: 103
- Time zone: UTC+3:30 (IRST)

Pasha Chay (Persian: پاشاچاي) (Note: Also romanized as Pāshā Chā’ī and Pāshā Chāy) is a village in Ijrud-e Pain Rural District of Halab District in Ijrud County, Zanjan province, Iran.

== Demographics ==
=== Population ===
At the time of the 2006 National Census, the village's population was 159 in 42 households. The following census in 2011 counted 146 people in 56 households. The 2016 census measured the population of the village as 103 people in 36 households.
