= Chapuq =

Village in Zanjan province, Iran

Chapuq Persian: چاپوق
- Village
- Location within Iran
- Coordinates: 36°31′31″N 48°13′06″E
- Country: Iran
- Province: Zanjan
- County: Ijrud
- District: Central
- Rural District: Golabar

Population (2016)
  - Total: 626
- Time zone: UTC+3:30 (IRST)

Chapuq (Persian: چاپوق) (Note: Also romanized as Chāpūq; also known as Chapykh and Chūpāq) is a village in Golabar Rural District of the Central District in Ijrud County, Zanjan province, Iran.

== Demographics ==
=== Population ===
At the time of the 2006 National Census, the village's population was 592 in 144 households. The following census in 2011 counted 650 people in 188 households. The 2016 census measured the population of the village as 626 people in 193 households.
