= Qareh Said, Zanjan =

Village in Zanjan province, Iran

Qareh Said Persian: قره سعيد
- Village
- Location within Iran
- Coordinates: 36°28′42″N 48°22′12″E
- Country: Iran
- Province: Zanjan
- County: Ijrud
- District: Central
- Rural District: Ijrud-e Bala

Population (2016)
  - Total: 1,038
- Time zone: UTC+3:30 (IRST)

Qareh Said (Persian: قره سعيد) (Note: Also romanized as Qareh Saʿīd; also known as Qarah Seyyed and Qareh Seyyed) is a village in, and the capital of, Ijrud-e Bala Rural District in the Central District of Ijrud County, Zanjan province, Iran. The previous capital of the rural district was the village of Zarrinabad, now a city.

== Demographics ==
=== Population ===
At the time of the 2006 National Census, the village's population was 954 in 191 households. The following census in 2011 counted 1,016 people in 281 households. The 2016 census measured the population of the village as 1,038 people in 289 households.
