= Sarab, Ijrud =

Village in Zanjan province, Iran

Sarab Persian: سراب
- Village
- Location within Iran
- Coordinates: 36°14′02″N 48°15′20″E
- Country: Iran
- Province: Zanjan
- County: Ijrud
- District: Central
- Rural District: Golabar

Population (2016)
  - Total: 30
- Time zone: UTC+3:30 (IRST)

Sarab (Persian: سراب) (Note: Also romanized as Sarāb and Serab) is a village in Golabar Rural District of the Central District in Ijrud County, Zanjan province, Iran.

== Demographics ==
=== Population ===
At the time of the 2006 National Census, the village's population was 54 in 13 households. The following census in 2011 counted 48 people in 14 households. The 2016 census measured the population of the village as 30 people in 10 households.
