= Khanjian =

Khanjian or Khanjyan (Armenian: Խանջյան, Western Armenian Խանճեան, derived from Turkish "hancı" [han "inn" + cı "agentive suffix"], meaning "innkeeper") is an Armenian surname and place name. It may refer to:

== People ==
- Aghasi Khanjian (1901–1936), first secretary of the Armenian Communist Party
- Arsinée Khanjian (born 1958), Canadian actress and film director
- David Khanjyan (1940–1981), Soviet conductor and pianist
- Grigor Khanjyan (1926–2000), Artist (People's Artist of Soviet Union)

== Places ==
- Khanjyan, Armenia, a town in the Armavir Province of Armenia

== See also ==
- Khanjin, a village in Zanjan Province, Iran
- Andrea Khanjin, (born 1987), a Canadian politician
- Khenejin, a city in Markazi Province, Iran
