= Ahmad Kandi =

Village in Zanjan province, Iran

Ahmad Kandi Persian: احمدكندي
- Village
- Location within Iran
- Coordinates: 36°30′03″N 48°19′55″E
- Country: Iran
- Province: Zanjan
- County: Ijrud
- District: Central
- Rural District: Ijrud-e Bala

Population (2016)
  - Total: 907
- Time zone: UTC+3:30 (IRST)

Ahmad Kandi (Persian: احمدكندي) (Note: Also romanized as Aḩmad Kandī; also known as Akhmadkandi) is a village in Ijrud-e Bala Rural District of the Central District in Ijrud County, Zanjan province, Iran.

== Demographics ==
=== Population ===
At the time of the 2006 National Census, the village's population was 894 in 209 households. The following census in 2011 counted 925 people in 253 households. The 2016 census measured the population of the village as 907 people in 285 households.
