= Bahman, Zanjan =

Village in Zanjan province, Iran

Bahman Persian: بهمن
- Village
- Location within Iran
- Coordinates: 36°07′35″N 48°15′18″E
- Country: Iran
- Province: Zanjan
- County: Ijrud
- District: Halab
- Rural District: Ijrud-e Pain

Population (2016)
  - Total: 83
- Time zone: UTC+3:30 (IRST)

Bahman (Persian: بهمن) (Note: Also known as Bakhman and Behmān) is a village in Ijrud-e Pain Rural District of Halab District in Ijrud County, Zanjan province, Iran.

== Demographics ==
=== Population ===
At the time of the 2006 National Census, the village's population was 128 in 33 households. The following census in 2011 counted 87 people in 30 households. The 2016 census measured the population of the village as 83 people in 27 households.
