= Barik Ab, Ijrud =

Village in Zanjan province, Iran

Barik Ab Persian: باريك اب
- Village
- Location within Iran
- Coordinates: 36°24′10″N 48°27′17″E
- Country: Iran
- Province: Zanjan
- County: Ijrud
- District: Central
- Rural District: Ijrud-e Bala

Population (2016)
  - Total: 798
- Time zone: UTC+3:30 (IRST)

Barik Ab (Persian: باريك اب) (Note: Also romanized as Bārīk Āb; also known as Barkāb and Barkoud) is a village in Ijrud-e Bala Rural District of the Central District in Ijrud County, Zanjan province, Iran.

== Demographics ==
=== Population ===
At the time of the 2006 National Census, the village's population was 715 in 181 households. The following census in 2011 counted 818 people in 221 households. The 2016 census measured the population of the village as 798 people in 246 households.
