= Quriyeh =

Village in Zanjan province, Iran

Quriyeh Persian: قوريه
- Village
- Location within Iran
- Coordinates: 36°17′30″N 48°10′50″E
- Country: Iran
- Province: Zanjan
- County: Ijrud
- District: Halab
- Rural District: Ijrud-e Pain

Population (2016)
  - Total: 171
- Time zone: UTC+3:30 (IRST)

Quriyeh (Persian: قوريه) (Note: Also romanized as Qowryeh and Qūrīyeh; also known as Qoryeh) is a village in Ijrud-e Pain Rural District of Halab District in Ijrud County, Zanjan province, Iran.

== Demographics ==
=== Population ===
At the time of the 2006 National Census, the village's population was 124 in 40 households. The following census in 2011 counted 124 people in 43 households. The 2016 census measured the population of the village as 171 people in 71 households.
