= Shur Ab, Ijrud =

Village in Zanjan province, Iran

Shur Ab Persian: شوراب
- Village
- Location within Iran
- Coordinates: 36°24′46″N 48°05′27″E
- Country: Iran
- Province: Zanjan
- County: Ijrud
- District: Central
- Rural District: Saidabad

Population (2016)
  - Total: 161
- Time zone: UTC+3:30 (IRST)

Shur Ab (Persian: شوراب) (Note: Also romanized as Shūr Āb and Shūrāb; also known as Sarāb and Shirou) is a village in Saidabad Rural District of the Central District in Ijrud County, Zanjan province, Iran.

== Demographics ==
=== Population ===
At the time of the 2006 National Census, the village's population was 81 in 33 households. The following census in 2011 counted 100 people in 51 households. The 2016 census measured the population of the village as 161 people in 61 households.
