= Molla Piri =

Village in Zanjan province, Iran

Molla Piri Persian: ملاپيري
- Village
- Location within Iran
- Coordinates: 36°23′37″N 48°02′29″E
- Country: Iran
- Province: Zanjan
- County: Ijrud
- District: Central
- Rural District: Saidabad

Population (2016)
  - Total: 867
- Time zone: UTC+3:30 (IRST)

Molla Piri (Persian: ملاپيري) (Note: Also romanized as Mollā Pīrī; also known as Mollā Parī and Mullah Pīri) is a village in Saidabad Rural District of the Central District in Ijrud County, Zanjan province, Iran.

== Demographics ==
=== Population ===
At the time of the 2006 National Census, the village's population was 1,107 in 281 households. The following census in 2011 counted 1,020 people in 298 households. The 2016 census measured the population of the village as 867 people in 253 households.
