= Gonbad, Zanjan =

Village in Zanjan province, Iran

Gonbad Persian: گنبد
- Village
- Location within Iran
- Coordinates: 36°09′11″N 48°02′33″E
- Country: Iran
- Province: Zanjan
- County: Ijrud
- District: Halab
- Rural District: Ijrud-e Pain

Population (2016)
  - Total: 88
- Time zone: UTC+3:30 (IRST)

Gonbad (Persian: گنبد) (Note: Also known as Gumbezler and Gunbad) is a village in Ijrud-e Pain Rural District of Halab District in Ijrud County, Zanjan province, Iran.

== Demographics ==
=== Population ===
At the time of the 2006 National Census, the village's population was 106 in 31 households. The following census in 2011 counted 157 people in 57 households. The 2016 census measured the population of the village as 88 people in 29 households.
