= Armutlu, Iran =

Village in Zanjan province, Iran

Armutlu Persian: ارموتلو
- Village
- Location within Iran
- Coordinates: 36°24′01″N 47°53′08″E
- Country: Iran
- Province: Zanjan
- County: Ijrud
- District: Halab
- Rural District: Ijrud-e Pain

Population (2016)
  - Total: 75
- Time zone: UTC+3:30 (IRST)

Armutlu (Persian: ارموتلو) (Note: Also romanized as Ārmūtlū) is a village in Ijrud-e Pain Rural District of Halab District in Ijrud County, Zanjan province, Iran.

== Demographics ==
=== Population ===
At the time of the 2006 National Census, the village's population was 76 in 19 households. The following census in 2011 counted 98 people in 34 households. The 2016 census measured the population of the village as 75 people in 26 households.
