= Ij, Zanjan =

Village in Zanjan province, Iran

Ij Persian: ايج
- Village
- Location within Iran
- Coordinates: 36°27′11″N 48°12′46″E
- Country: Iran
- Province: Zanjan
- County: Ijrud
- District: Central
- Rural District: Golabar

Population (2016)
  - Total: 790
- Time zone: UTC+3:30 (IRST)

Ij (Persian: ايج) (Note: Also romanized as Īj; also known as Hich and Īch) is a village in Golabar Rural District of the Central District in Ijrud County, Zanjan province, Iran.

== Demographics ==
=== Population ===
At the time of the 2006 National Census, the village's population was 726 in 183 households. The following census in 2011 counted 807 people in 228 households. The 2016 census measured the population of the village as 790 people in 252 households.
