= Najm ol Sheykhan =

Village in Zanjan province, Iran

Najm ol Sheykhan Persian: نجم الشيخان
- Village
- Location within Iran
- Coordinates: 36°17′05″N 48°13′39″E
- Country: Iran
- Province: Zanjan
- County: Ijrud
- District: Halab
- Rural District: Ijrud-e Pain

Population (2016)
  - Total: 306
- Time zone: UTC+3:30 (IRST)

Najm ol Sheykhan (Persian: نجم الشيخان) (Note: Also known as Nāderchekhān, Nadirchikhan, Nadirchkhān, Najm esh Sheykhān, Najm osh Sheykhān, Najm Sheykhan, Naz̧m Sheykhān, and Naz̧m-e Sheykhān) is a village in Ijrud-e Pain Rural District of Halab District in Ijrud County, Zanjan province, Iran.

== Demographics ==
=== Population ===
At the time of the 2006 National Census, the village's population was 336 in 77 households. The following census in 2011 counted 340 people in 99 households. The 2016 census measured the population of the village as 306 people in 96 households.
