= Qareh Daraq, Zanjan =

Village in Zanjan province, Iran

Qareh Daraq Persian: قره‌درق
- Village
- Location within Iran
- Coordinates: 36°18′32″N 48°14′34″E
- Country: Iran
- Province: Zanjan
- County: Ijrud
- District: Central
- Rural District: Golabar

Population (2016)
  - Total: 206
- Time zone: UTC+3:30 (IRST)

Qareh Daraq (Persian: قره‌درق) (Note: Also known as Kara Darrekh, Qara Darreh, Qareh Darreh, and Qarrah Darreh) is a village in Golabar Rural District of the Central District in Ijrud County, Zanjan province, Iran.

== Demographics ==
=== Population ===
At the time of the 2006 National Census, the village's population was 120 in 34 households. The following census in 2011 counted 207 people in 62 households. The 2016 census measured the population of the village as 206 people in 61 households.
