= Khoein =

Village in Zanjan province, Iran

Khoein Persian: خوئين
- Village
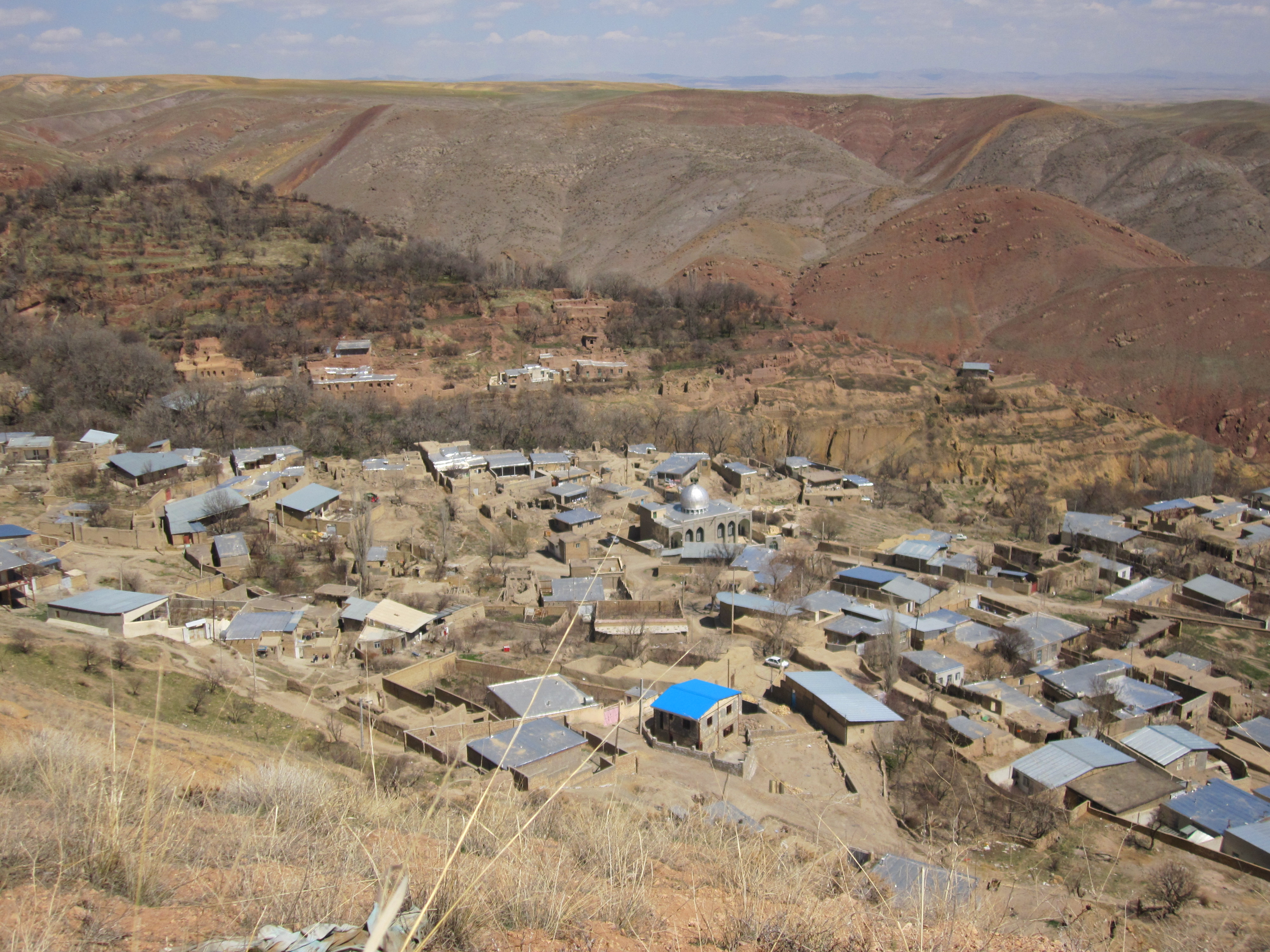
- The village of Khoein

- Location within Iran
- Coordinates: 36°21′15″N 48°06′50″E
- Country: Iran
- Province: Zanjan
- County: Ijrud
- District: Halab
- Rural District: Ijrud-e Pain

Population (2016)
  - Total: 228
- Time zone: UTC+3:30 (IRST)

Khoein (Persian: خوئين) (Note: Also romanized as Kho’īn, Khow’īn, Khoyun, Khūyin, Khvoin, and Khvo’īn) is a village in Ijrud-e Pain Rural District of Halab District in Ijrud County, Zanjan province, Iran.

== Demographics ==
=== Language ===
The people of Khoein speak the Khoeini dialect of Tati, an old language of Azerbaijan.

=== Population ===
At the time of the 2006 National Census, the village's population was 132 in 57 households. The following census in 2011 counted 263 people in 121 households. The 2016 census measured the population of the village as 228 people in 101 households.
