= Chulcheh Qeshlaq =

Village in Zanjan province, Iran

Chulcheh Qeshlaq Persian: چولچه قشلاق
- Village
- Location within Iran
- Coordinates: 36°14′08″N 48°05′37″E
- Country: Iran
- Province: Zanjan
- County: Ijrud
- District: Halab
- Rural District: Ijrud-e Pain

Population (2016)
  - Total: 107
- Time zone: UTC+3:30 (IRST)

Chulcheh Qeshlaq (Persian: چولچه قشلاق) (Note: Also romanized as Chūlcheh Qeshlāq; also known as Choljah Qeshlāq, Choljeh Qeshlāq, Chooljeh Gheslagh, Chowlcheh Qeshlāq, Chowljeh Qeshlāq, and Chūljeh Qeshlāq) is a village in Ijrud-e Pain Rural District of Halab District in Ijrud County, Zanjan province, Iran.

== Demographics ==
=== Population ===
At the time of the 2006 National Census, the village's population was 142 in 40 households. The following census in 2011 counted 136 people in 53 households. The 2016 census measured the population of the village as 107 people in 33 households.
