= Qareh Dowrakhlu-ye Sofla =

Village in Zanjan province, Iran

Qareh Dowrakhlu-ye Sofla Persian: قره دوراخلوسفلي
- Village
- Location within Iran
- Coordinates: 36°06′26″N 48°09′52″E
- Country: Iran
- Province: Zanjan
- County: Ijrud
- District: Halab
- Rural District: Ijrud-e Pain

Population (2016)
  - Total: 24
- Time zone: UTC+3:30 (IRST)

Qareh Dowrakhlu-ye Sofla (Persian: قره دوراخلوسفلي) (Note: Also romanized as Qareh Dowrākhlū-ye Soflá; also known as Qara Dūlāglū, Qarah Dūlākhlū, Qareh Delākhlū, Qareh Dolākhlū, Qareh Dowrākhlū-ye Pā’īn, Qareh Dūlākhlū, Qareh Dūlākhlū-ye Pā’īn, and Qareh Dūrākhlū) is a village in Ijrud-e Pain Rural District of Halab District in Ijrud County, Zanjan province, Iran.

== Demographics ==
=== Population ===
At the time of the 2006 National Census, the village's population was 37 in 11 households. The following census in 2011 counted 30 people in 10 households. The 2016 census measured the population of the village as 24 people in nine households.
