= Qezeljeh, Ijrud =

Village in Zanjan province, Iran

Qezeljeh Persian: قزلجه
- Village
- Location within Iran
- Coordinates: 36°21′48″N 48°09′21″E
- Country: Iran
- Province: Zanjan
- County: Ijrud
- District: Central
- Rural District: Saidabad

Population (2016)
  - Total: 175
- Time zone: UTC+3:30 (IRST)

Qezeljeh (Persian: قزلجه) (Note: Also romanized as Qezeljah; also known as Kizildzhakh and Qiziljah) is a village in Saidabad Rural District of the Central District in Ijrud County, Zanjan province, Iran.

== Demographics ==
=== Population ===
At the time of the 2006 National Census, the village's population was 200 in 66 households. The following census in 2011 counted 147 people in 56 households. The 2016 census measured the population of the village as 175 people in 64 households.
