= Owch Tappeh, Zanjan =

Village in Zanjan province, Iran

Owch Tappeh Persian: اوچ تپه
- Village
- Location within Iran
- Coordinates: 36°31′26″N 48°17′54″E
- Country: Iran
- Province: Zanjan
- County: Ijrud
- District: Central
- Rural District: Ijrud-e Bala

Population (2016)
  - Total: 692
- Time zone: UTC+3:30 (IRST)

Owch Tappeh (Persian: اوچ تپه) (Note: Also romanized as Uch-Tapa, Ūch Tappeh, and Uchtepe) is a village in Ijrud-e Bala Rural District of the Central District in Ijrud County, Zanjan province, Iran.

== Demographics ==
=== Population ===
At the time of the 2006 National Census, the village's population was 705 in 184 households. The following census in 2011 counted 760 people in 228 households. The 2016 census measured the population of the village as 692 people in 215 households.
