= Shahrak, Zanjan =

Village in Zanjan province, Iran

Shahrak Persian: شهرك
- Village
- Location within Iran
- Coordinates: 36°26′58″N 48°05′43″E
- Country: Iran
- Province: Zanjan
- County: Ijrud
- District: Central
- Rural District: Saidabad

Population (2016)
  - Total: 786
- Time zone: UTC+3:30 (IRST)

Shahrak (Persian: شهرك) (Note: Also known as Shāhrek and Sharak) is a village in Saidabad Rural District of the Central District in Ijrud County, Zanjan province, Iran.

== Location ==
Shahrak is a village located in Saidabad Rural District within the Central District of Ijrud County, Zanjan Province, northwestern Iran.

== Demographics ==
=== Population ===
At the time of the 2006 National Census, the village's population was 1,179 in 340 households. The following census in 2011 counted 893 people in 288 households. The 2016 census measured the population of the village as 786 people in 266 households.
