= Qandi Bolagh =

Village in Zanjan province, Iran

Qandi Bolagh Persian: قندي بلاغ
- Village
- Location within Iran
- Coordinates: 36°17′32″N 48°01′04″E
- Country: Iran
- Province: Zanjan
- County: Ijrud
- District: Halab
- Rural District: Ijrud-e Pain

Population (2016)
  - Total: 96
- Time zone: UTC+3:30 (IRST)

Qandi Bolagh (Persian: قندي بلاغ) (Note: Also romanized as Qandī Bolāgh; also known as Kand Bulag, Kandbulāq, and Qand Bolāgh) is a village in Ijrud-e Pain Rural District of Halab District in Ijrud County, Zanjan province, Iran.

== Demographics ==
=== Population ===
At the time of the 2006 National Census, the village's population was 72 in 15 households. The following census in 2011 counted 63 people in 18 households. The 2016 census measured the population of the village as 96 people in 29 households.
