= Yaddi Bolagh, Zanjan =

Village in Zanjan province, Iran

Yaddi Bolagh Persian: يدي بلاغ
- Village
- Location within Iran
- Coordinates: 36°27′43″N 48°14′33″E
- Country: Iran
- Province: Zanjan
- County: Ijrud
- District: Central
- Rural District: Golabar

Population (2016)
  - Total: 79
- Time zone: UTC+3:30 (IRST)

Yaddi Bolagh (Persian: يدي بلاغ) (Note: Also romanized as Yaddī Bolāgh, Yadī Bolāgh, and Yeddī Bolāgh; also known as Yadibulak and Yadibulāq) is a village in Golabar Rural District of the Central District in Ijrud County, Zanjan province, Iran.

== Demographics ==
=== Population ===
At the time of the 2006 National Census, the village's population was 79 in 23 households. The following census in 2011 counted 73 people in 23 households. The 2016 census measured the population of the village as 79 people in 23 households.
