= Hajj Qeshlaq =

Village in Zanjan province, Iran

Hajj Qeshlaq Persian: حاج قشلاق
- Village
- Location within Iran
- Coordinates: 36°17′59″N 47°57′43″E
- Country: Iran
- Province: Zanjan
- County: Ijrud
- District: Halab
- Rural District: Ijrud-e Pain

Population (2016)
  - Total: 68
- Time zone: UTC+3:30 (IRST)

Hajj Qeshlaq (Persian: حاج قشلاق) (Note: Also romanized as Ḩājj Qeshlāq; also known as Hāj, Ḩājī Qeshlāq, Ḩājjī Qeshlāq, and Hāz Qishlāq) is a village in Ijrud-e Pain Rural District of Halab District in Ijrud County, kurdistan province, Iran.

== Demographics ==
=== Population ===
At the time of the 2006 National Census, the village's population was 166 in 35 households. The following census in 2011 counted 142 people in 40 households. The 2016 census measured the population of the village as 68 people in 19 households.
