= Qaderlu, Zanjan =

Village in Zanjan province, Iran

Qaderlu Persian: قادرلو
- Village
- Location within Iran
- Coordinates: 36°09′30″N 48°15′38″E
- Country: Iran
- Province: Zanjan
- County: Ijrud
- District: Halab
- Rural District: Ijrud-e Pain

Population (2016)
  - Total: 16
- Time zone: UTC+3:30 (IRST)

Qaderlu (Persian: قادرلو) (Note: Also romanized as Qāderlū; also known as Kadirlu and Qādirlu) is a village in Ijrud-e Pain Rural District of Halab District in Ijrud County, Zanjan province, Iran.

== Demographics ==
=== Population ===
At the time of the 2006 National Census, the village's population was 24 in five households. The village did not appear in the following census of 2011. The 2016 census measured the population of the village as 16 people in four households.
