= Aghol Beyk =

Aghol Beyk (Persian: اغلبيك), also rendered as Aghalbak or Aqalbak or Ogholbeyg or Oghol Beyg or Oghul Beyg or Ogholbeyk or Owghli Beyg or Owghol Beyg, may refer to:

- Aghol Beyk-e Olya
- Aghol Beyk-e Sofla
- Ogholbeyk-e Duzkand
- Oghul Beyg, West Azerbaijan
