= Bagh Kandi =

Village in Zanjan province, Iran

Bagh Kandi Persian: باغ كندي
- Village
- Location within Iran
- Coordinates: 36°27′28″N 48°25′45″E
- Country: Iran
- Province: Zanjan
- County: Ijrud
- District: Central
- Rural District: Ijrud-e Bala

Population (2016)
  - Total: 264
- Time zone: UTC+3:30 (IRST)

Bagh Kandi (Persian: باغ كندي) (Note: Also romanized as Bāgh Kandī, Bāgh-i-Kandi, and Bag-Kendi) is a village in Ijrud-e Bala Rural District of the Central District in Ijrud County, Zanjan province, Iran.

== Demographics ==
=== Population ===
At the time of the 2006 National Census, the village's population was 265 in 75 households. The following census in 2011 counted 268 people in 89 households. The 2016 census measured the population of the village as 264 people in 90 households.
