= Quzan, Zanjan =

Village in Zanjan province, Iran

Quzan Persian: قوزان
- Village
- Location within Iran
- Coordinates: 36°30′00″N 48°13′19″E
- Country: Iran
- Province: Zanjan
- County: Ijrud
- District: Central
- Rural District: Golabar

Population (2016)
  - Total: 470
- Time zone: UTC+3:30 (IRST)

Quzan (Persian: قوزان) (Note: Also romanized as Qūzān; also known as Ozan and Uzūn) is a village in Golabar Rural District of the Central District in Ijrud County, Zanjan province, Iran.

== Demographics ==
=== Population ===
At the time of the 2006 National Census, the village's population was 520 in 134 households. The following census in 2011 counted 595 people in 171 households. The 2016 census measured the population of the village as 470 people in 148 households.
