= Qushchi, Zanjan =

Village in Zanjan province, Iran

Qushchi Persian: قوشچي
- Village
- Location within Iran
- Coordinates: 36°10′35″N 48°13′28″E
- Country: Iran
- Province: Zanjan
- County: Ijrud
- District: Halab
- Rural District: Ijrud-e Pain

Population (2016)
  - Total: 134
- Time zone: UTC+3:30 (IRST)

Qushchi (Persian: قوشچي) (Note: Also romanized as Qūshchī; also known as Qūshcheh) is a village in Ijrud-e Pain Rural District of Halab District in Ijrud County, Zanjan province, Iran.

== Demographics ==
=== Population ===
At the time of the 2006 National Census, the village's population was 179 in 43 households. The following census in 2011 counted 144 people in 50 households. The 2016 census measured the population of the village as 134 people in 49 households.
