= Saidabad-e Olya, Zanjan =

Village in Zanjan province, Iran

Saidabad-e Olya Persian: سعيداباد عليا
- Village
- Location within Iran
- Coordinates: 36°23′21″N 48°06′34″E
- Country: Iran
- Province: Zanjan
- County: Ijrud
- District: Central
- Rural District: Saidabad

Population (2016)
  - Total: 976
- Time zone: UTC+3:30 (IRST)

Saidabad-e Olya (Persian: سعيدابادعليا) (Note: Also romanized as Sa‘id Abad Olya and Sa‘īdābād-e ‘Olyā; also known as Sa‘īdābād, Sa‘īdābād-e Bālā, Saiyidābād, and Seydābād) is a village in, and the capital of, Saidabad Rural District in the Central District of Ijrud County, Zanjan province, Iran.

== Demographics ==
=== Population ===
At the time of the 2006 National Census, the village's population was 913 in 266 households. The following census in 2011 counted 1,280 people in 418 households. The 2016 census measured the population of the village as 976 people in 341 households. It was the most populous village in its rural district.
