= Nakatu =

Nakatu may refer to:

- Nakatu, Estonia
- Nakatu, Iran
