= Qolqati =

Village in Zanjan province, Iran

Qolqati Persian: قلقاتي
- Village
- Location within Iran
- Coordinates: 36°12′52″N 48°15′11″E
- Country: Iran
- Province: Zanjan
- County: Ijrud
- District: Halab
- Rural District: Ijrud-e Pain

Population (2016)
  - Total: 339
- Time zone: UTC+3:30 (IRST)

Qolqati (Persian: قلقاتي) (Note: Also romanized as Qolqātī) is a village in Ijrud-e Pain Rural District of Halab District in Ijrud County, Zanjan province, Iran.

== Demographics ==
=== Population ===
At the time of the 2006 National Census, the village's population was 549 in 137 households. The following census in 2011 counted 450 people in 101 households. The 2016 census measured the population of the village as 339 people in 106 households.
