= Golabar =

Golabar (Persian: گلابر), also rendered as Ghalabar or Qolabar or Qulabir, may refer to:

- Golabar-e Sofla
- Golabar Rural District
