= Qarkhotlu =

Village in Zanjan province, Iran

Qarkhotlu Persian: قارختلو
- Village
- Location within Iran
- Coordinates: 36°28′14″N 48°23′46″E
- Country: Iran
- Province: Zanjan
- County: Ijrud
- District: Central
- Rural District: Ijrud-e Bala

Population (2016)
  - Total: 527
- Time zone: UTC+3:30 (IRST)

Qarkhotlu (Persian: قارختلو) (Note: Also romanized as Qārkhotlū; also known as Karkhurta, Qarakhurtali, Qārkhowdlū, Qārkhūdlū, Qārkhūtlī, Qārkhūtlū, and Qārkhvodlū) is a village in Ijrud-e Bala Rural District of the Central District in Ijrud County, Zanjan province, Iran.

== Demographics ==
=== Population ===
At the time of the 2006 National Census, the village's population was 555 in 136 households. The following census in 2011 counted 628 people in 181 households. The 2016 census measured the population of the village as 527 people in 157 households.
