= Khanqah, Zanjan =

Village in Zanjan province, Iran

Khanqah Persian: خانقاه
- Village
- Location within Iran
- Coordinates: 36°22′45″N 48°14′05″E
- Country: Iran
- Province: Zanjan
- County: Ijrud
- District: Central
- Rural District: Golabar

Population (2016)
  - Total: 316
- Time zone: UTC+3:30 (IRST)

Khanqah (Persian: خانقاه) (Note: Also romanized as Khāneqāh and Khānqāh; also known as Khanakakh and Khānegāh) is a village in Golabar Rural District of the Central District in Ijrud County, Zanjan province, Iran.

== Demographics ==
=== Population ===
At the time of the 2006 National Census, the village's population was 311 in 83 households. The following census in 2011 counted 318 people in 96 households. The 2016 census measured the population of the village as 316 people in 96 households.
