= Bidgineh =

Village in Zanjan province, Iran

Bidgineh Persian: بيدگينه
- Village
- Location within Iran
- Coordinates: 36°30′18″N 48°11′55″E
- Country: Iran
- Province: Zanjan
- County: Ijrud
- District: Central
- Rural District: Golabar

Population (2016)
  - Total: 950
- Time zone: UTC+3:30 (IRST)

Bidgineh (Persian: بيدگينه) (Note: Also romanized as Bīd Gīneh and Bīdgīneh; also known as Bichneh, Bīd Geneh, Bīdkaneh, and Bitkinya) is a village in Golabar Rural District of the Central District in Ijrud County, Zanjan province, Iran.

== Demographics ==
=== Population ===
At the time of the 2006 National Census, the village's population was 880 in 220 households. The following census in 2011 counted 1,089 people in 310 households. The 2016 census measured the population of the village as 950 people in 309 households.
