= Qarah Dagh, Zanjan =

Village in Zanjan province, Iran

Qarah Dagh Persian: قره داغ
- Village
- Location within Iran
- Coordinates: 36°16′22″N 48°16′34″E
- Country: Iran
- Province: Zanjan
- County: Ijrud
- District: Central
- Rural District: Golabar

Population (2016)
  - Total: 79
- Time zone: UTC+3:30 (IRST)

Qarah Dagh (Persian: قره داغ) (Note: Also romanized as Qareh Dāgh, Qarrah Dagh, and Qarrah Dāgh; also known as Karadag and Qara Dāgh) is a village in Golabar Rural District of the Central District in Ijrud County, Zanjan province, Iran.

== Demographics ==
=== Population ===
At the time of the 2006 National Census, the village's population was 131 in 32 households. The following census in 2011 counted 113 people in 34 households. The 2016 census measured the population of the village as 79 people in 23 households.
