= Chulcheh =

Village in Zanjan province, Iran

Chulcheh Persian: چولچه
- Village
- Location within Iran
- Coordinates: 36°26′36″N 47°56′24″E
- Country: Iran
- Province: Zanjan
- County: Ijrud
- District: Halab
- Rural District: Ijrud-e Pain

Population (2016)
  - Total: 53
- Time zone: UTC+3:30 (IRST)

Chulcheh (Persian: چولچه) (Note: Also romanized as Chūlcheh; also known as Choldzhekh and Chūleh) is a village in Ijrud-e Pain Rural District of Halab District in Ijrud County, Zanjan province, Iran.

== Demographics ==
=== Population ===
At the time of the 2006 National Census, the village's population was 90 in 23 households. The following census in 2011 counted 72 people in 20 households. The 2016 census measured the population of the village as 53 people in 17 households.
