= Chesb =

Village in Zanjan province, Iran

Chesb Persian: چسب
- Village
- Location within Iran
- Coordinates: 36°12′08″N 48°10′40″E
- Country: Iran
- Province: Zanjan
- County: Ijrud
- District: Halab
- Rural District: Ijrud-e Pain

Population (2016)
  - Total: 522
- Time zone: UTC+3:30 (IRST)

Chesb (Persian: چسب) (Note: Also romanized as Chasb; also known as Chāsp and Chisp) is a village in Ijrud-e Pain Rural District of Halab District in Ijrud County, Zanjan province, Iran.

== Demographics ==
=== Population ===
At the time of the 2006 National Census, the village's population was 508 in 137 households. The following census in 2011 counted 516 people in 168 households. The 2016 census measured the population of the village as 522 people in 168 households.
