= Daydar =

Daydar or Dayedar or Daidar (Persian: دايدار) may refer to:

- Daydar-e Olya
- Daydar-e Sofla
