= Yar Kandi =

Village in Zanjan province, Iran

Yar Kandi Persian: ياركندي
- Village
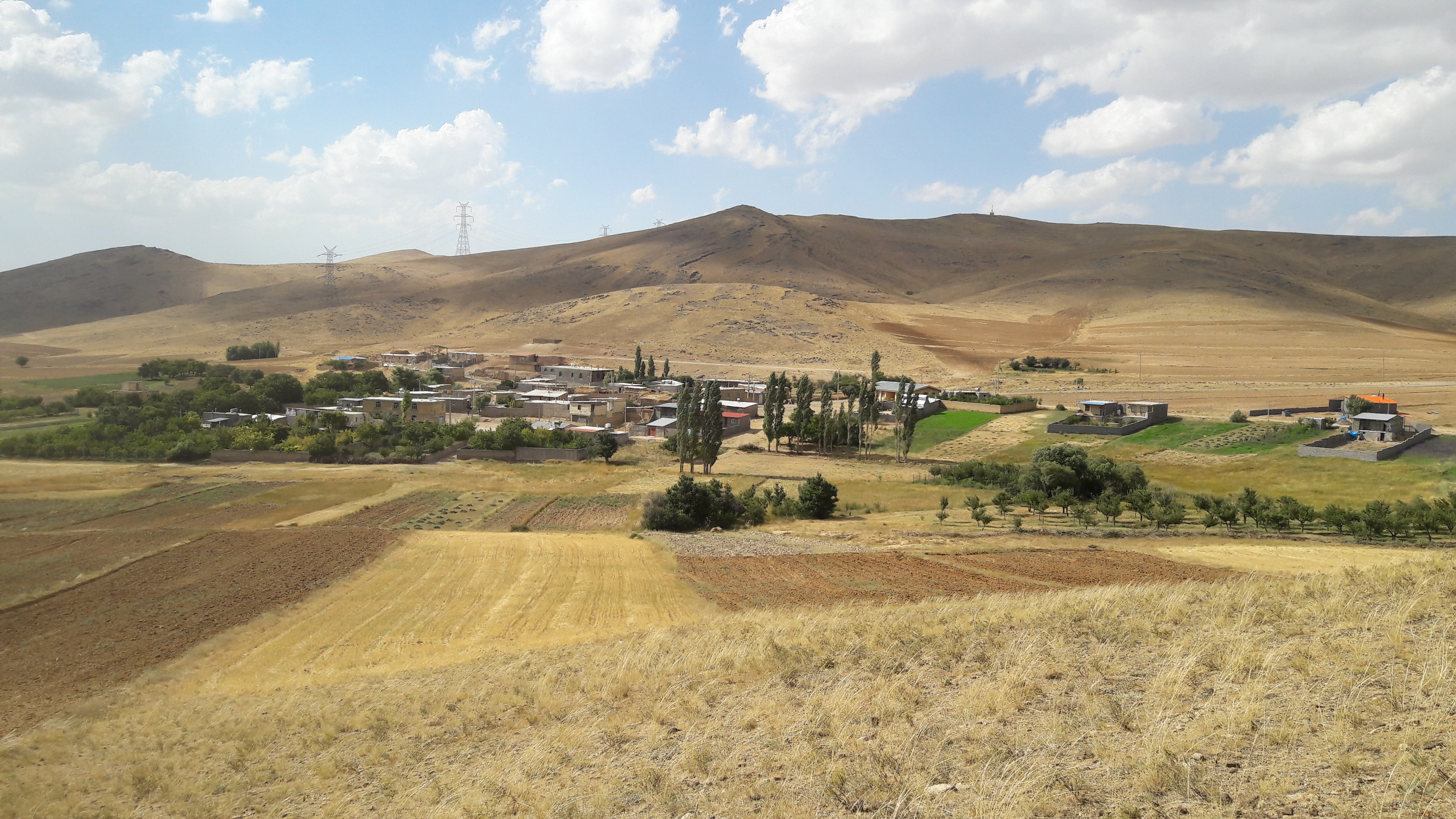
- Country: Iran
- Province: Zanjan
- County: Ijrud
- District: Central
- Rural District: Ijrud-e Bala

Population (2016)
  - Total: 18
- Time zone: UTC+3:30 (IRST)

Yar Kandi (Persian: ياركندي) (Note: Also romanized as Yār Kandī; formerly known as Doshman Kandi (دشمن كندي)) is a village in Ijrud-e Bala Rural District of the Central District in Ijrud County, Zanjan province, Iran.

== Demographics ==
=== Population ===
At the time of the 2006 National Census, the village's population was 35 in seven households. The following census in 2011 counted 67 people in 22 households. The 2016 census measured the population of the village as 18 people in six households.
