= Golijeh, Ijrud =

Village in Zanjan province, Iran

Golijeh Persian: گليجه
- Village
- Location within Iran
- Coordinates: 36°14′01″N 48°17′09″E
- Country: Iran
- Province: Zanjan
- County: Ijrud
- District: Central
- Rural District: Golabar

Population (2016)
  - Total: 17
- Time zone: UTC+3:30 (IRST)

Golijeh (Persian: گليجه) (Note: Also romanized as Golījeh and Gollījeh; also known as Goljeh, Gullejeh, Gulludzhekh, and Kollījeh) is a village in Golabar Rural District of the Central District in Ijrud County, Zanjan province, Iran.

== Demographics ==
=== Population ===
At the time of the 2006 National Census, the village's population was 34 in seven households. The following census in 2011 counted 20 people in six households. The 2016 census measured the population of the village as 17 people in four households.
