= Qarah Bolagh, Ijrud =

Village in Zanjan province, Iran

Qarah Bolagh Persian: قره بلاغ
- Village
- Location within Iran
- Coordinates: 36°25′04″N 48°00′46″E
- Country: Iran
- Province: Zanjan
- County: Ijrud
- District: Central
- Rural District: Saidabad

Population (2016)
  - Total: 45
- Time zone: UTC+3:30 (IRST)

Qarah Bolagh (Persian: قره بلاغ) (Note: Also romanized as Qarah Bolāgh and Qareh Bolāgh; also known as Karbala) is a village in Saidabad Rural District of the Central District in Ijrud County, Zanjan province, Iran.

== Demographics ==
=== Population ===
At the time of the 2006 National Census, the village's population was four in four households. The following census in 2011 counted 56 people in 25 households. The 2016 census measured the population of the village as 45 people in 17 households.
