= Ala Chaman =

Village in Zanjan province, Iran

Ala Chaman Persian: الاچمن
- Village
- Location within Iran
- Coordinates: 36°25′23″N 48°32′57″E
- Country: Iran
- Province: Zanjan
- County: Ijrud
- District: Central
- Rural District: Ijrud-e Bala

Population (2016)
  - Total: 1,069
- Time zone: UTC+3:30 (IRST)

Ala Chaman (Persian: الاچمن) (Note: Also romanized as A‘lā Chaman and Ālā Chaman) is a village in Ijrud-e Bala Rural District of the Central District in Ijrud County, Zanjan province, Iran.

== Demographics ==
=== Population ===
At the time of the 2006 National Census, the village's population was 1,048 in 233 households. The following census in 2011 counted 1,048 people in 274 households. The 2016 census measured the population of the village as 1,069 people in 297 households.
