= Incheh Rahbari =

Village in Zanjan province, Iran

Incheh Rahbari Persian: اينچه رهبري
- Village
- Location within Iran
- Coordinates: 36°26′39″N 48°23′54″E
- Country: Iran
- Province: Zanjan
- County: Ijrud
- District: Central
- Rural District: Ijrud-e Bala

Population (2016)
  - Total: 674
- Time zone: UTC+3:30 (IRST)

Incheh Rahbari (Persian: اينچه رهبري) (Note: Also romanized as Īncheh Rahbarī; also known as Īncheh') is a village in Ijrud-e Bala Rural District of the Central District in Ijrud County, Zanjan province, Iran.

== Demographics ==
=== Population ===
At the time of the 2006 National Census, the village's population was 718 in 166 households. The following census in 2011 counted 743 people in 228 households. The 2016 census measured the population of the village as 674 people in 204 households.
