= Aq Bolagh, Zanjan =

Village in Zanjan province, Iran

Aq Bolagh Persian: آقبلاغ
- Village
- Location within Iran
- Coordinates: 36°24′10″N 48°31′23″E
- Country: Iran
- Province: Zanjan
- County: Ijrud
- District: Central
- Rural District: Ijrud-e Bala

Population (2016)
  - Total: 817
- Time zone: UTC+3:30 (IRST)

Aq Bolagh (Persian: آقبلاغ) (Note: Also romanized as Āq Bolāgh; also known as Ak-Bulag and Āqbulāq) is a village in Ijrud-e Bala Rural District of the Central District in Ijrud County, Zanjan province, Iran.

== Demographics ==
=== Population ===
At the time of the 2006 National Census, the village's population was 674 in 157 households. The following census in 2011 counted 783 people in 212 households. The 2016 census measured the population of the village as 817 people in 249 households.
