= Saha, Iran =

Village in Zanjan province, Iran

Saha Persian: سُها
- Village
- Location within Iran
- Coordinates: 36°18′58″N 48°21′44″E
- Country: Iran
- Province: Zanjan
- County: Ijrud
- District: Central
- Rural District: Golabar

Population (2016)
  - Total: 0
- Time zone: UTC+3:30 (IRST)

Saha (Persian: سها) (Note: Also romanized as Sahā, Soha, and Sohā; also known as Saḩeh and Sakha) is a village in Golabar Rural District of the Central District in Ijrud County, Zanjan province, Iran.

== Demographics ==
=== Population ===
At the time of the 2006 National Census, the village's population was 601 in 159 households. Its population in the following census of 2011 was below the reporting threshold. The 2016 census measured the population of the village as zero.
