= Abu Janlu =

Village in Zanjan province, Iran

Abu Janlu Persian: ابوجانلو
- Village
- Location within Iran
- Coordinates: 36°07′43″N 48°08′04″E
- Country: Iran
- Province: Zanjan
- County: Ijrud
- District: Halab
- Rural District: Ijrud-e Pain

Population (2016)
  - Total: 50
- Time zone: UTC+3:30 (IRST)

Abu Janlu (Persian: ابوجانلو) (Note: Also romanized as Abū Jānlū; also known as Ābājānlū, Abidzhanglu, Abijanglu, Āb-i-Jānlu, and Ābūchānlū) is a village in Ijrud-e Pain Rural District of Halab District in Ijrud County, Zanjan province, Iran.

== Demographics ==
=== Population ===
At the time of the 2006 National Census, the village's population was 60 in 17 households. The following census in 2011 counted 56 people in 16 households. The 2016 census measured the population of the village as 50 people in 13 households.
