= Khakriz, Zanjan =

Village in Zanjan province, Iran

Khakriz Persian: خاكريز
- Village
- Location within Iran
- Coordinates: 36°27′05″N 48°26′56″E
- Country: Iran
- Province: Zanjan
- County: Ijrud
- District: Central
- Rural District: Ijrud-e Bala

Population (2016)
  - Total: 130
- Time zone: UTC+3:30 (IRST)

Khakriz (Persian: خاكريز) (Note: Also romanized as Khāk Rīz and Khākrīz; also known as Khakir and Khākraz) is a village in Ijrud-e Bala Rural District of the Central District in Ijrud County, Zanjan province, Iran.

== Demographics ==
=== Population ===
At the time of the 2006 National Census, the village's population was 162 in 41 households. The following census in 2011 counted 127 people in 41 households. The 2016 census measured the population of the village as 130 people in 45 households.
