= Kahriz Siyah Mansur =

Village in Zanjan province, Iran

Kahriz Siyah Mansur Persian: كهريزسياه منصور
- Village
- Location within Iran
- Coordinates: 36°23′04″N 47°57′39″E
- Country: Iran
- Province: Zanjan
- County: Ijrud
- District: Halab
- Rural District: Ijrud-e Pain

Population (2016)
  - Total: 154
- Time zone: UTC+3:30 (IRST)

Kahriz Siyah Mansur (Persian: كهريزسياه منصور) (Note: Also romanized as Kahrīz Sīāh Mansūr and Kahrīz Sīyāh Mansūr; also known as Kahrīz and Nahrīz) is a village in Ijrud-e Pain Rural District of Halab District in Ijrud County, Zanjan province, Iran.

== Demographics ==
=== Population ===
At the time of the 2006 National Census, the village's population was 150 in 37 households. The following census in 2011 counted 224 people in 69 households. The 2016 census measured the population of the village as 154 people in 52 households.
