= Sain, Zanjan =

Village in Zanjan province, Iran

Sain Persian: صايين
- Village
- Location within Iran
- Coordinates: 36°27′09″N 47°57′42″E
- Country: Iran
- Province: Zanjan
- County: Ijrud
- District: Halab
- Rural District: Ijrud-e Pain

Population (2016)
  - Total: 471
- Time zone: UTC+3:30 (IRST)

Sain (Persian: صايين) (Note: Also romanized as Şā’īn and Sā’īn) is a village in Ijrud-e Pain Rural District of Halab District in Ijrud County, Zanjan province, Iran.

== Demographics ==
=== Population ===
At the time of the 2006 National Census, the village's population was 247 in 83 households. The following census in 2011 counted 279 people in 103 households. The 2016 census measured the population of the village as 471 people in 150 households.
