= Shivah, Zanjan =

Village in Zanjan province, Iran

Shivah Persian: شيوه
- Village
- Location within Iran
- Coordinates: 36°20′15″N 48°23′31″E
- Country: Iran
- Province: Zanjan
- County: Ijrud
- District: Central
- Rural District: Golabar

Population (2016)
  - Total: 1,439
- Time zone: UTC+3:30 (IRST)

Shivah (Persian: شيوه) (Note: Also romanized as Shīvah and Shīveh; also known as Shivekh) is a village in Golabar Rural District of the Central District in Ijrud County, Zanjan province, Iran.

== Demographics ==
=== Population ===
At the time of the 2006 National Census, the village's population was 1,388 in 324 households. The following census in 2011 counted 1,418 people in 379 households. The 2016 census measured the population of the village as 1,439 people in 442 households.
