= Kusahlar =

Village in Zanjan province, Iran

Kusahlar Persian: كوسه لر
- Village
- Location within Iran
- Coordinates: 36°29′58″N 48°21′30″E
- Country: Iran
- Province: Zanjan
- County: Ijrud
- District: Central
- Rural District: Ijrud-e Bala

Population (2016)
  - Total: 693
- Time zone: UTC+3:30 (IRST)

Kusahlar (Persian: كوسه لر) (Note: Also romanized as Kūsahlar and Kūsehlar; also known as Kossehlar, Kusahiar, Kusalar, and Kūzehlar) is a village in Ijrud-e Bala Rural District of the Central District in Ijrud County, Zanjan province, Iran.

== Demographics ==
=== Population ===
At the time of the 2006 National Census, the village's population was 634 in 126 households. The following census in 2011 counted 629 people in 155 households. The 2016 census measured the population of the village as 693 people in 187 households.
