= Qarah Buteh, Ijrud =

Village in Zanjan province, Iran

Qarah Buteh Persian: قره بوته
- Village
- Location within Iran
- Coordinates: 36°21′10″N 47°56′52″E
- Country: Iran
- Province: Zanjan
- County: Ijrud
- District: Halab
- Rural District: Ijrud-e Pain

Population (2016)
  - Total: 68
- Time zone: UTC+3:30 (IRST)

Qarah Buteh (Persian: قره بوته) (Note: Also romanized as Qarah Būteh and Qareh Būteh) is a village in Ijrud-e Pain Rural District of Halab District in Ijrud County, Zanjan province, Iran.

== Demographics ==
=== Population ===
At the time of the 2006 National Census, the village's population was 157 in 40 households. The following census in 2011 counted 161 people in 42 households. The 2016 census measured the population of the village as 125 people in 38 households.
