= Taleh Jerd =

Village in Zanjan province, Iran

Taleh Jerd Persian: تله جرد
- Village
- Location within Iran
- Coordinates: 36°28′17″N 48°13′55″E
- Country: Iran
- Province: Zanjan
- County: Ijrud
- District: Central
- Rural District: Golabar

Population (2016)
  - Total: 685
- Time zone: UTC+3:30 (IRST)

Taleh Jerd (Persian: تله جرد) (Note: Also romanized as Taleh Jerd; also known as Tahleh Cherd, Talaird, Talegerd, Taleh Gerd, and Tehla Sard) is a village in Golabar Rural District of the Central District in Ijrud County, Zanjan province, Iran.

== Demographics ==
=== Population ===
At the time of the 2006 National Census, the village's population was 693 in 155 households. The following census in 2011 counted 731 people in 189 households. The 2016 census measured the population of the village as 685 people in 204 households.
