= Halilabad =

Village in Zanjan province, Iran

Halilabad Persian: هليل اباد
- Village
- Location within Iran
- Coordinates: 36°14′45″N 48°19′47″E
- Country: Iran
- Province: Zanjan
- County: Ijrud
- District: Central
- Rural District: Golabar

Population (2016)
  - Total: 734
- Time zone: UTC+3:30 (IRST)

Halilabad (Persian: هليل اباد) (Note: Also romanized as Halīlābād; also known as ‘Alīlābād, Jalīlābād, and Khillabad) is a village in Golabar Rural District of the Central District in Ijrud County, Zanjan province, Iran.

== Demographics ==
=== Population ===
At the time of the 2006 National Census, the village's population was 674 in 171 households. The following census in 2011 counted 717 people in 200 households. The 2016 census measured the population of the village as 734 people in 217 households.
