= Durmeshqan =

Village in Zanjan province, Iran

Durmeshqan Persian: دورمشقان
- Village
- Location within Iran
- Coordinates: 36°26′29″N 48°32′03″E
- Country: Iran
- Province: Zanjan
- County: Ijrud
- District: Central
- Rural District: Ijrud-e Bala

Population (2016)
  - Total: 35
- Time zone: UTC+3:30 (IRST)

Durmeshqan (Persian: دورمشقان) (Note: Also romanized as Dūrmeshqān and Dūrmoshqān; also known as Darmeshkān, Domoshqān, Dor Meshkān, Dormoshkān, and Durmushkha) is a village in Ijrud-e Bala Rural District of the Central District in Ijrud County, Zanjan province, Iran.

== Demographics ==
=== Population ===
At the time of the 2006 National Census, the village's population was 46 in eight households. The following census in 2011 counted 52 people in 21 households. The 2016 census measured the population of the village as 35 people in eight households.
