= Golabar-e Sofla =

Village in Zanjan province, Iran

Golabar-e Sofla Persian: گلابرسفلي
- Village
- Location within Iran
- Coordinates: 36°20′17″N 48°17′47″E
- Country: Iran
- Province: Zanjan
- County: Ijrud
- District: Central
- Rural District: Golabar

Population (2016)
  - Total: 2,434
- Time zone: UTC+3:30 (IRST)

Golabar-e Sofla (Persian: گلابرسفلي) (Note: Also romanized as Golābar-e Soflá; also known as Ghalabar Sofla, Kulabar, Qolābar-e Pā’īn, Qolābar-e Soflá, Qolābar-e Soflā, Qulabīr Buzurg, and Qulabīr-e Buzurq) is a village in Golabar Rural District of the Central District in Ijrud County, Zanjan province, Iran.

== Demographics ==
=== Population ===
At the time of the 2006 National Census, the village's population was 1,883 in 505 households. The following census in 2011 counted 2,388 people in 681 households. The 2016 census measured the population of the village as 2,434 people in 725 households.
