= Juqin =

Juqin (Persian: جوقين) may refer to:

- Juqin, Iran, Zanjan Province
- Juqin Rural District, in Tehran Province
