= Qamcheqay =

Qamcheqay or Qamchaqai or Qomchoqay (Persian: قمچقاي), also rendered as Kamchakay or Qamchay or Qamchiqah, may refer to:

- Qomchoqay, Kurdistan
- Qamcheqay, Ijrud, Zanjan Province
- Qamcheqay, Khodabandeh, Zanjan Province
