= Agholbeyk-e Sofla =

Village in Zanjan province, Iran

Aghol Beyk-e Sofla Persian: اغلبیک سفلی
- Village
- Location within Iran
- Coordinates: 36°26′04″N 48°28′15″E
- Country: Iran
- Province: Zanjan
- County: Ijrud
- District: Central
- Rural District: Ijrud-e Bala

Population (2016)
  - Total: 1,155
- Time zone: UTC+3:30 (IRST)

Aghol Beyk-e Sofla (Persian: اغلبیک سفلی) (Note: Also romanized as Āghol Beyk-e Soflá; also known as Aghalbak, Aqalbak Pāin, Ash Oghulbeyn, Oghol Beyg-e Pā’īn, Ogholbeyg, Owghlī Beyg-e Soflá, and Owghol Beyg-e Pā’īn) is a village in Ijrud-e Bala Rural District of the Central District in Ijrud County, Zanjan province, Iran.

== Demographics ==
=== Population ===
At the time of the 2006 National Census, the village's population was 930 in 229 households. The following census in 2011 counted 1,101 people in 286 households. The 2016 census measured the population of the village as 1,155 people in 335 households. It was the most populous village in its rural district.
