= Yengi Kand-e Jame ol Sara =

Village in Zanjan province, Iran

Yengi Kand-e Jame ol Sara Persian: ينگي كندجامع السرا
- Village
- Location within Iran
- Coordinates: 36°14′51″N 47°59′56″E
- Country: Iran
- Province: Zanjan
- County: Ijrud
- District: Halab
- Rural District: Ijrud-e Pain

Population (2016)
  - Total: 460
- Time zone: UTC+3:30 (IRST)

Yengi Kand-e Jame ol Sara (Persian: ينگي كندجامع السرا) (Note: Also romanized as Yengī Kand-e Jāme‘ ol Sarā and Yengī Kand-e Jāme‘ os Sarā; also known as Yangi Kand, Yengī Gand-e Jāmeh, Yengī Kand, Yengī Kand-e Jāme‘ Sarā, Yengī Kand-e Jāmeh Sarā, Yengī Kand-e Jameh Sarā, and Yengīkand-e Jāme‘eh Sarā) is a village in Ijrud-e Pain Rural District of Halab District in Ijrud County, Zanjan province, Iran.

== Demographics ==
=== Population ===
At the time of the 2006 National Census, the village's population was 512 in 119 households. The following census in 2011 counted 515 people in 174 households. The 2016 census measured the population of the village as 460 people in 147 households.
