= Aghol Beyk-e Olya =

Village in Zanjan province, Iran

Aghol Beyk-e Olya Persian: اغلبیک عليا
- Village
- Location within Iran
- Coordinates: 36°28′54″N 48°28′08″E
- Country: Iran
- Province: Zanjan
- County: Ijrud
- District: Central
- Rural District: Ijrud-e Bala

Population (2016)
  - Total: 790
- Time zone: UTC+3:30 (IRST)

Aghol Beyk-e Olya (Persian: اغلبيك عليا) (Note: Also romanized as Āghol Beyk-e ‘Olyā; also known as Aghalbak, Aqalbak Bāla, Ogholbeyg-e Bālā, Ogholbeyk-e- ‘Olyā, Oghūl Beyg-e Bālā, Oghulbeyn, Owghlī Beyg-e ‘Olyā, and Owghol Beyg-e Bālā) is a village in Ijrud-e Bala Rural District of the Central District in Ijrud County, Zanjan province, Iran.

== Demographics ==
=== Population ===
At the time of the 2006 National Census, the village's population was 949 in 232 households. The following census in 2011 counted 888 people in 263 households. The 2016 census measured the population of the village as 790 people in 264 households.
