= Chataz, Ijrud =

Village in Zanjan province, Iran

Chataz Persian: چتز
- Village
- Location within Iran
- Coordinates: 36°26′02″N 48°26′55″E
- Country: Iran
- Province: Zanjan
- County: Ijrud
- District: Central
- Rural District: Ijrud-e Bala

Population (2016)
  - Total: 963
- Time zone: UTC+3:30 (IRST)

Chataz (Persian: چتز) (Note: Also romanized as Chetez; also known as Chhātaz) is a village in Ijrud-e Bala Rural District of the Central District in Ijrud County, Zanjan province, Iran.

== Demographics ==
=== Population ===
At the time of the 2006 National Census, the village's population was 741 in 167 households. The following census in 2011 counted 915 people in 262 households. The 2016 census measured the population of the village as 963 people in 302 households.
