= Daydar-e Sofla =

Village in Zanjan province, Iran

Daydar-e Sofla Persian: دايدارسفلي
- Village
- Location within Iran
- Coordinates: 36°08′22″N 48°06′45″E
- Country: Iran
- Province: Zanjan
- County: Ijrud
- District: Halab
- Rural District: Ijrud-e Pain

Population (2016)
  - Total: 48
- Time zone: UTC+3:30 (IRST)

Daydar-e Sofla (Persian: دايدارسفلي) (Note: Also romanized as Dāidār Sufla, Daydar Sofla, and Dāydār-e Soflá; also known as Daidar, Dāydār, Daydar, Dāydār-e Pā’īn, and Dāyedār-e Pā’īn) is a village in Ijrud-e Pain Rural District of Halab District in Ijrud County, Zanjan province, Iran.

== Demographics ==
=== Population ===
At the time of the 2006 National Census, the village's population was 69 in 18 households. The following census in 2011 counted 55 people in 17 households. The 2016 census measured the population of the village as 48 people in 16 households.
