= Balvbin =

Village in Zanjan province, Iran

Balvbin Persian: بلوبين
- Village
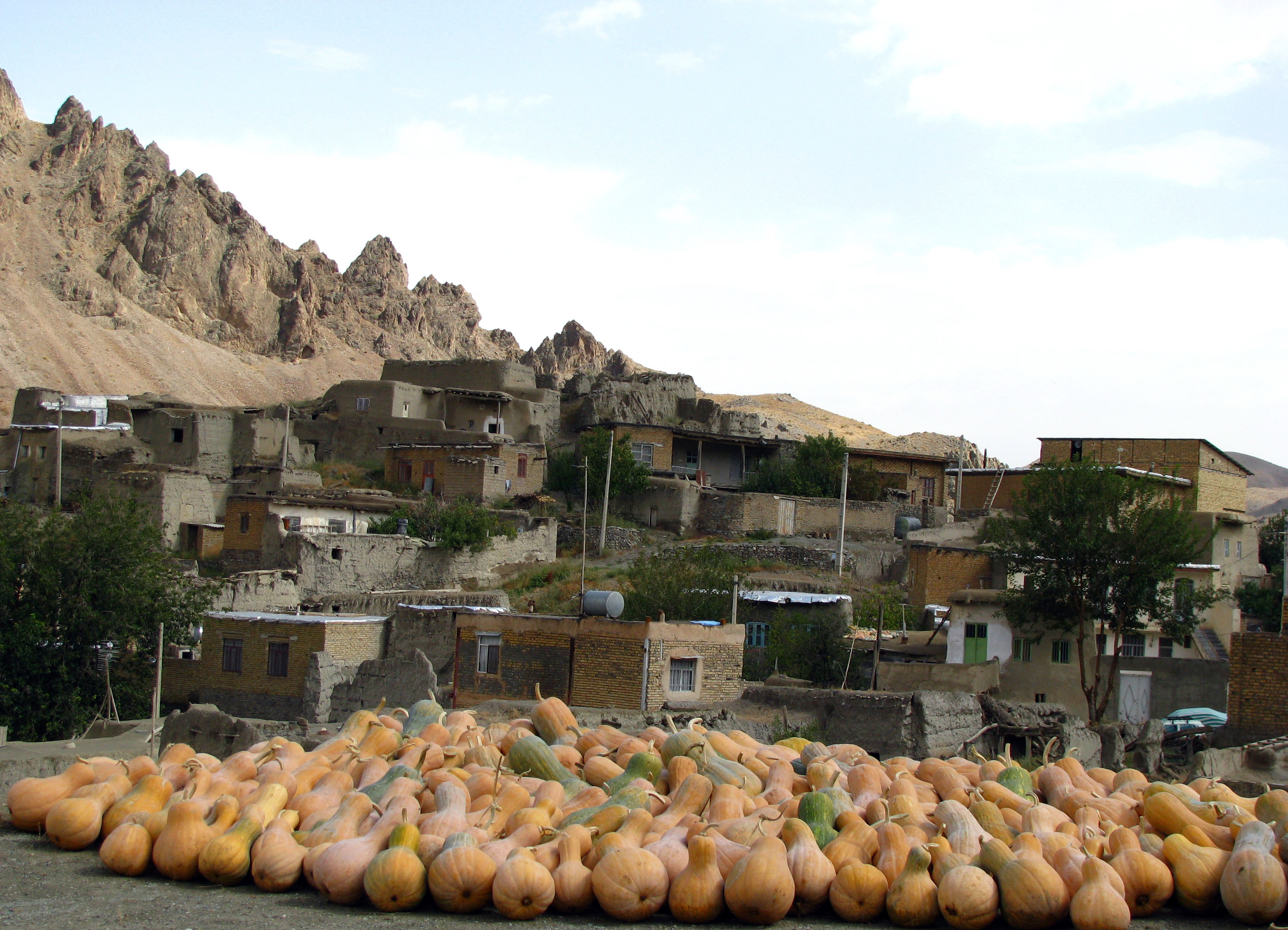
- The village of Balvbin

- Location within Iran
- Coordinates: 36°19′41″N 48°12′10″E
- Country: Iran
- Province: Zanjan
- County: Ijrud
- District: Halab
- Rural District: Ijrud-e Pain

Population (2016)
  - Total: 9
- Time zone: UTC+3:30 (IRST)

Balvbin (Persian: بلوبين) (Note: Also romanized as Balūbīn and Balvbīn; also known as Balugan) is a village in Ijrud-e Pain Rural District of Halab District in Ijrud County, Zanjan province, Iran.

Talebi and Jafari are the main families originating in the village. Many of the residents migrated to Tehran choosing bakery as the main profession. It is currently used by old residents as a holiday destination over warmer summer months. Its population is only 3 families over the winter with Torab Dayee being the main resident and contributor keeping the village alive.

== Demographics ==
=== Population ===
At the time of the 2006 National Census, the village's population was 66 in 23 households. The following census in 2011 counted 10 people in five households. The 2016 census measured the population of the village as nine people in six households.
