= Chataz =

Chataz and Chetez (Persian: چتز) may refer to:

- Chataz, Ijrud
- Chataz, Mahneshan
