= Daydar-e Olya =

Village in Zanjan province, Iran

Daydar-e Olya Persian: دايدارعليا
- Village
- Location within Iran
- Coordinates: 36°09′05″N 48°06′03″E
- Country: Iran
- Province: Zanjan
- County: Ijrud
- District: Halab
- Rural District: Ijrud-e Pain

Population (2016)
  - Total: 52
- Time zone: UTC+3:30 (IRST)

Daydar-e Olya (Persian: دايدارعليا) (Note: Also romanized as Dāydār-e ‘Olyā and Daydar Olya; also known as Dāidār ‘Uliya, Daydar, Dāyedār, and Dāyedār-e Bālā) is a village in Ijrud-e Pain Rural District of Halab District in Ijrud County, Zanjan province, Iran.

== Demographics ==
=== Population ===
At the time of the 2006 National Census, the village's population was 142 in 43 households. The following census in 2011 counted 141 people in 50 households. The 2016 census measured the population of the village as 52 people in 18 households.
