= Khanjin =

Village in Zanjan province, Iran

Khanjin Persian: خانجين
- Village
- Location within Iran
- Coordinates: 36°24′59″N 48°14′53″E
- Country: Iran
- Province: Zanjan
- County: Ijrud
- District: Central
- Rural District: Golabar

Population (2016)
  - Total: 470
- Time zone: UTC+3:30 (IRST)

Khanjin (Persian: خانجين) (Note: Also romanized as Khān Jīn, Khānejīn, and Khānjīn; also known as Khakadzhin and Khānaji) is a village in Golabar Rural District of the Central District in Ijrud County, Zanjan province, Iran.

== Demographics ==
=== Population ===
At the time of the 2006 National Census, the village's population was 396 in 113 households. The following census in 2011 counted 543 people in 161 households. The 2016 census measured the population of the village as 470 people in 155 households.
