= Qara Qayeh, Zanjan =

Village in Zanjan province, Iran

Qara Qayeh Persian: قراقيه
- Village
- Location within Iran
- Coordinates: 36°22′39″N 47°54′08″E
- Country: Iran
- Province: Zanjan
- County: Ijrud
- District: Halab
- Rural District: Ijrud-e Pain

Population (2016)
  - Total: 84
- Time zone: UTC+3:30 (IRST)

Qara Qayeh (Persian: قراقيه) (Note: Also romanized as Qarā Qayeh; also known as Qarah Qayeh and Qareh Qayeh) is a village in Ijrud-e Pain Rural District of Halab District in Ijrud County, Zanjan province, Iran.

== Demographics ==
=== Population ===
At the time of the 2006 National Census, the village's population was 104 in 23 households. The following census in 2011 counted 137 people in 42 households. The 2016 census measured the population of the village as 84 people in 25 households.
