= Qaraqiyeh =

Qaraqiyeh or Qara Qayeh (Persian: قراقيه) may refer to:

- Qara Qayeh, Hamadan
- Qara Qayeh, Zanjan
