= Garneh =

Village in Zanjan province, Iran

Garneh Persian: گرنه
- Village
- Location within Iran
- Coordinates: 36°20′28″N 48°07′50″E
- Country: Iran
- Province: Zanjan
- County: Ijrud
- District: Halab
- Rural District: Ijrud-e Pain

Population (2016)
  - Total: 63
- Time zone: UTC+3:30 (IRST)

Garneh (Persian: گرنه) (Note: Also known as Karnaj, and Karneh) is a village in Ijrud-e Pain Rural District of Halab District in Ijrud County, Zanjan province, Iran.

== Demographics ==
=== Population ===
At the time of the 2006 National Census, the village's population was 71 in 21 households. The following census in 2011 counted 71 people in 23 households. The 2016 census measured the population of the village as 63 people in 21 households.
