= Arkuyen =

Village in Zanjan province, Iran

Arkuyen Persian: ارکوئين
- Village
- Location within Iran
- Coordinates: 36°18′50″N 48°08′26″E
- Country: Iran
- Province: Zanjan
- County: Ijrud
- District: Halab
- Rural District: Ijrud-e Pain

Population (2016)
  - Total: 301
- Time zone: UTC+3:30 (IRST)

Arquyen (Persian: ارکوئين) (Note: Also romanized as Arkowyen and Arkūyen; also known as Arkaun, Arkavin, Arkovīn, Arkūten, Arqueen, and Darkovīn) is a village in Ijrud-e Pain Rural District of Halab District in Ijrud County, Zanjan province, Iran.

== Demographics ==
=== Population ===
At the time of the 2006 National Census, the village's population was 217 in 75 households. The following census in 2011 counted 257 people in 95 households. The 2016 census measured the population of the village as 301 people in 109 households.
