= Chugun =

Chugun may refer to:

- Chūgun Station, and a village that gave the name to the station, Japan
- Chugun, Iran, a village in Zanjan Province, Iran
- Chugun, a kind of pot
- A character in the 2005 Russian film The 9th Company
