= Xkc =

Xkc can refer to:

- .xkc, the proposed country TLD for Kosovo
- Kho'ini dialect, a language spoken in Iran, by ISO 639 code
