= Sefid Kamar, Zanjan =

Village in Zanjan province, Iran

Sefid Kamar Persian: سفيدكمر
- Village
- Location within Iran
- Coordinates: 36°20′16″N 48°03′54″E
- Country: Iran
- Province: Zanjan
- County: Ijrud
- District: Halab
- Rural District: Ijrud-e Pain

Population (2016)
  - Total: 347
- Time zone: UTC+3:30 (IRST)

Sefid Kamar (Persian: سفيدكمر) (Note: Also romanized as Safīd Kamar and Sefīd Kamar) is a village in Ijrud-e Pain Rural District of Halab District in Ijrud County, Zanjan province, Iran.

== Demographics ==
=== Population ===
At the time of the 2006 National Census, the village's population was 206 in 67 households. The following census in 2011 counted 306 people in 115 households. The 2016 census measured the population of the village as 347 people in 119 households.
