= Nakatu, Iran =

Village in Zanjan province, Iran

Nakatu Persian: نكتو
- Village
- Location within Iran
- Coordinates: 36°14′27″N 48°12′05″E
- Country: Iran
- Province: Zanjan
- County: Ijrud
- District: Halab
- Rural District: Ijrud-e Pain

Population (2016)
  - Total: 606
- Time zone: UTC+3:30 (IRST)

Nakatu (Persian: نكتو) (Note: Also romanized as Nakatū; also known as Lakatu, Nagatū, Nagtū, and Taktu) is a village in Ijrud-e Pain Rural District of Halab District in Ijrud County, Zanjan province, Iran.

== Demographics ==
=== Population ===
At the time of the 2006 National Census, the village's population was 652 in 146 households. The following census in 2011 counted 672 people in 201 households. The 2016 census measured the population of the village as 606 people in 181 households. It was the most populous village in its rural district.
