= Yengi Kand-e Seyyedlar =

Village in Zanjan province, Iran

Yengi Kand-e Seyyedlar Persian: ينگي كندسيدلر
- Village
- Location within Iran
- Coordinates: 36°27′08″N 48°15′30″E
- Country: Iran
- Province: Zanjan
- County: Ijrud
- District: Central
- Rural District: Golabar

Population (2016)
  - Total: 1,168
- Time zone: UTC+3:30 (IRST)

Yengi Kand-e Seyyedlar (Persian: ينگي كندسيدلر) (Note: Also romanized as Yangī Kand-e Seyyedlar, Yengī Kand Seyyedlar, and Yengī Kand-e Seyyedlar; also known as Yangikand, Yangikend, and Yengī Kand) is a village in Golabar Rural District of the Central District in Ijrud County, Zanjan province, Iran.

== Demographics ==
=== Population ===
At the time of the 2006 National Census, the village's population was 1,284 in 376 households. The following census in 2011 counted 1,582 people in 430 households. The 2016 census measured the population of the village as 1,168 people in 392 households.
