= Di language =

Di may refer to:

- Kho'ini dialect of Iran
- Ding language of Congo
- Di language, the extinct language of the Di (Five Barbarians)
