= Yengi Kand-e Kandesaha =

Village in Zanjan province, Iran

Yengi Kand-e Kandesaha Persian: ينگي کند کندسها
- Village
- Location within Iran
- Coordinates: 36°19′17″N 48°21′37″E
- Country: Iran
- Province: Zanjan
- County: Ijrud
- District: Central
- Rural District: Golabar

Population (2006)
  - Total: 63
- Time zone: UTC+3:30 (IRST)

Yengi Kand-e Kandesaha (Persian: ينگي کند کندسها) (Note: Also romanized as Yengī Kand-e Kandesahā; also known as Yengeh Kand and Yengī Kand; formerly known as Yengī Kand-e Majẕūmīn (ينگي کند مجذومين)) is a village in Golabar Rural District of the Central District in Ijrud County, Zanjan province, Iran.

== Demographics ==
=== Population ===
At the time of the 2006 National Census, the village's population was 63 in 14 households. The village did not appear in the following censuses of 2011 and 2016.
