= Qamcheqay, Ijrud =

Village in Zanjan province, Iran

Qamcheqay Persian: قمچقاي
- Village
- Location within Iran
- Coordinates: 36°22′20″N 48°12′09″E
- Country: Iran
- Province: Zanjan
- County: Ijrud
- District: Central
- Rural District: Golabar

Population (2016)
  - Total: 404
- Time zone: UTC+3:30 (IRST)

Qamcheqay (Persian: قمچقاي) (Note: Also romanized as Qamchaqai and Qamcheqāy; also known as Kamchakay, Qamchāy, and Qamchīqāh) is a village in Golabar Rural District of the Central District in Ijrud County, Zanjan province, Iran.

== Demographics ==
=== Population ===
At the time of the 2006 National Census, the village's population was 434 in 115 households. The following census in 2011 counted 459 people in 136 households. The 2016 census measured the population of the village as 404 people in 135 households.
