= Saidabad-e Sofla, Zanjan =

Village in Zanjan province, Iran

Saidabad-e Sofla Persian: سعيداباد سفلي
- Village
- Location within Iran
- Coordinates: 36°23′08″N 48°06′23″E
- Country: Iran
- Province: Zanjan
- County: Ijrud
- District: Central
- Rural District: Saidabad

Population (2016)
  - Total: 218
- Time zone: UTC+3:30 (IRST)

Saidabad-e Sofla (Persian: سعيداباد سفلي) (Note: Also romanized as Sa‘id Abad Sofla and Sa‘īdābād-e Soflá; also known as Safīdābād-e Soflá and Sa‘īdābād-e Pā’īn) is a village in Saidabad Rural District of the Central District in Ijrud County, Zanjan province, Iran.

== Demographics ==
=== Population ===
At the time of the 2006 National Census, the village's population was 222 in 74 households. The village did not appear in the following census of 2011. The 2016 census measured the population of the village as 218 people in 86 households.
