= Yenki Kand-e Mirza Almasi =

Village in Zanjan province, Iran

Yenki Kand-e Mirza Almasi Persian: ينكي كندميرزاالماسي
- Village
- Location within Iran
- Coordinates: 36°22′28″N 48°16′54″E
- Country: Iran
- Province: Zanjan
- County: Ijrud
- District: Central
- Rural District: Golabar

Population (2016)
  - Total: 146
- Time zone: UTC+3:30 (IRST)

Yenki Kand-e Mirza Almasi (Persian: ينكي كندميرزاالماسي) (Note: Also romanized as Yenkī Kand-e Mīrzā Almāsī; also known as Bangī Kand-e Almāsī, Yangī Kand Almās, Yangī Kand-e Almās, Yangī Kand-e Mīrzā, Yangī Kand Mīrzā Almās, Yangikand, and Yengī Kand-e Almāsī) is a village in Golabar Rural District of the Central District in Ijrud County, Zanjan province, Iran.

== Demographics ==
=== Population ===
At the time of the 2006 National Census, the village's population was 165 in 47 households. The following census in 2011 counted 170 people in 49 households. The 2016 census measured the population of the village as 146 people in 43 households.
