= Juqin, Iran =

Village in Zanjan province, Iran

Juqin Persian: جوقين
- Village
- Location within Iran
- Coordinates: 36°22′19″N 48°19′19″E
- Country: Iran
- Province: Zanjan
- County: Ijrud
- District: Central
- Rural District: Golabar

Population (2016)
  - Total: 3,129
- Time zone: UTC+3:30 (IRST)

Juqin (Persian: جوقين) (Note: Also romanized as Jūqīn; also known as Chugun, Joqin, and Khūqīn) is a village in, and the capital of, Golabar Rural District in the Central District of Ijrud County, Zanjan province, Iran.

== Demographics ==
=== Population ===
At the time of the 2006 National Census, the village's population was 2,557 in 568 households. The following census in 2011 counted 2,854 people in 729 households. The 2016 census measured the population of the village as 3,129 people in 928 households. It was the most populous village in its rural district.
