= Zarrinabad =

City in Zanjan province, Iran

Zarrinabad Persian: زرين آباد
- City
- Location within Iran
- Coordinates: 36°25′37″N 48°16′52″E
- Country: Iran
- Province: Zanjan
- County: Ijrud
- District: Central
- Established as a city: 1997

Population (2016)
  - Total: 2,374
- Time zone: UTC+3:30 (IRST)

Zarrinabad (Persian: زرين آباد) (Note: Also romanized as Zarinabad and Zarrīnābād) is a city in the Central District of Ijrud County, Zanjan province, Iran, serving as capital of both the county and the district. As a village, Zarrinabad was the capital of Ijrud-e Bala Rural District until its capital was transferred to the village of Qareh Said. Zarrinabad was elevated to the status of a city in 1997.

== Demographics ==
=== Population ===
At the time of the 2006 National Census, the city's population was 1,944 in 512 households. The following census in 2011 counted 2,471 people in 642 households. The 2016 census measured the population of the city as 2,374 people in 701 households.
