= Saidabad Rural District (Ijrud County) =

Rural district in Zanjan province, Iran

Saidabad Rural District Persian: دهستان سعيدآباد
- Rural District
- Location within Iran
- Coordinates: 36°25′N 48°06′E
- Country: Iran
- Province: Zanjan
- County: Ijrud
- District: Central
- Established: 1991
- Capital: Saidabad-e Olya

Population (2016)
  - Total: 3,228
- Time zone: UTC+3:30 (IRST)

Saidabad Rural District (Persian: دهستان سعيدآباد) is in the Central District of Ijrud County, Zanjan province, Iran. Its capital is the village of Saidabad-e Olya.

== Demographics ==
=== Population ===
At the time of the 2006 National Census, the rural district's population was 3,706 in 1,064 households. There were 3,496 inhabitants in 1,136 households at the following census of 2011. The 2016 census measured the population of the rural district as 3,228 in 1,088 households. The most populous of its seven villages was Saidabad-e Olya, with 976 people.

=== Other villages in the rural district ===
- Molla Piri
- Qarah Bolagh
- Qezeljeh
- Saidabad-e Sofla
- Shur Ab
- Shahrak
