= Ijrud-e Bala Rural District =

Rural district in Zanjan province, Iran

Ijrud-e Bala Rural District Persian: دهستان ايجرود بالا
- Rural District
- Location within Iran
- Coordinates: 36°27′N 48°24′E
- Country: Iran
- Province: Zanjan
- County: Ijrud
- District: Central
- Established: 1987
- Capital: Qareh Said

Population (2016)
  - Total: 10,570
- Time zone: UTC+3:30 (IRST)

Ijrud-e Bala Rural District (Persian: دهستان ايجرود بالا) is in the Central District of Ijrud County, Zanjan province, Iran. Its capital is the village of Qareh Said. The previous capital of the rural district was the village of Zarrinabad, now a city.

== Demographics ==
=== Population ===
At the time of the 2006 National Census, the rural district's population was 10,025 in 2,342 households. There were 10,768 inhabitants in 3,017 households at the following census of 2011. The 2016 census measured the population of the rural district as 10,570 in 3,179 households. The most populous of its 17 villages was Agholbeyk-e Sofla, with 1,155 people.

=== Other villages in the rural district ===
- Aghol Beyk-e Olya
- Ahmad Kandi
- Ala Chaman
- Aq Bolagh
- Bagh Kandi
- Barik Ab
- Chataz
- Durmeshqan
- Incheh Rahbari
- Khakriz
- Kusahlar
- Owch Tappeh
- Qarkhotlu
- Yar Kandi
