= Yengi Kand, Divandarreh =

Yengi Kand ينگي كند
- Village
- Location within Iran
- Coordinates: 36°02′16″N 47°13′18″E
- Country: Iran
- Province: Kurdistan
- County: Divandarreh
- Bakhsh: Central
- Rural District: Qaratureh

Population (2006)
  - Total: 292
- Time zone: UTC+3:30 (IRST)
  - Summer (DST): UTC+4:30 (IRDT)

Yengi Kand (Persian: ينگي كند, also Romanized as Yengī Kand) is a village in Qaratureh Rural District, in the Central District of Divandarreh County, Kurdistan Province, Iran. At the 2006 census, its population was 292, in 57 families. The village is populated by Kurds.
