= Yengi Kand, Bukan =

Yengi Kand ينگي كند
- Village
- Location within Iran
- Coordinates: 36°23′49″N 46°24′04″E
- Country: Iran
- Province: West Azerbaijan
- County: Bukan
- Bakhsh: Central
- Rural District: Behi-e Feyzolah Beygi

Population (2006)
  - Total: 563
- Time zone: UTC+3:30 (IRST)
  - Summer (DST): UTC+4:30 (IRDT)

Yengi Kand (Persian: ينگي كند, also Romanized as Yengī Kand) is a village in Behi-e Feyzolah Beygi Rural District, in the Central District of Bukan County, West Azerbaijan Province, Iran. At the 2006 census, its population was 563, in 100 families.
