= Arkavin, West Azerbaijan =

Arkavin اركوين
- Village
- Location within Iran
- Coordinates: 38°59′54″N 44°34′11″E
- Country: Iran
- Province: West Azerbaijan
- County: Chaldoran
- Bakhsh: Central
- Rural District: Baba Jik

Population (2006)
  - Total: 122
- Time zone: UTC+3:30 (IRST)
  - Summer (DST): UTC+4:30 (IRDT)

Arkavin (Persian: اركوين, also Romanized as Arkavīn) is a village in Baba Jik Rural District, in the Central District of Chaldoran County, West Azerbaijan Province, Iran. At the 2006 census, its population was 122, in 18 families.

== Name ==
According to Vladimir Minorsky, the name "Arkavin" is derived from the Mongolian name for Christians, erkeün.
