= Golabar Rural District =

Rural district in Zanjan province, Iran

Golabar Rural District Persian: دهستان گلابر
- Rural District
- Location within Iran
- Coordinates: 36°23′N 48°18′E
- Country: Iran
- Province: Zanjan
- County: Ijrud
- District: Central
- Established: 1997
- Capital: Juqin

Population (2016)
  - Total: 14,321
- Time zone: UTC+3:30 (IRST)

Golabar Rural District (Persian: دهستان گلابر) is in the Central District of Ijrud County, Zanjan province, Iran. Its capital is the village of Juqin.

== Demographics ==
=== Population ===
At the time of the 2006 National Census, the rural district's population was 13,644 in 3,433 households. There were 14,921 inhabitants in 4,111 households at the following census of 2011. The 2016 census measured the population of the rural district as 14,321 in 4,373 households. The most populous of its 27 villages was Juqin, with 3,129 people.

=== Other villages in the rural district ===
- Bidgineh
- Chapuq
- Golabar-e Sofla
- Golijeh
- Halilabad
- Ij
- Khanjin
- Khanqah
- Qamcheqay
- Qarah Dagh
- Qareh Daraq
- Quzan
- Saha
- Sarab
- Shivah
- Taleh Jerd
- Tazeh Kand
- Yaddi Bolagh
- Yengi Kand-e Kandesaha
- Yengi Kand-e Seyyedlar
- Yenki Kand-e Mirza Almasi
