= Ijrud-e Pain Rural District =

Rural district in Zanjan province, Iran

Ijrud-e Pain Rural District Persian: دهستان ايجرود پائين
- Rural District
- Location within Iran
- Coordinates: 36°17′N 48°05′E
- Country: Iran
- Province: Zanjan
- County: Ijrud
- District: Halab
- Established: 1988
- Capital: Halab

Population (2016)
  - Total: 5,192
- Time zone: UTC+3:30 (IRST)

Ijrud-e Pain Rural District (Persian: دهستان ايجرود پائين) is in Halab District of Ijrud County, Zanjan province, Iran. It is administered from the city of Halab.

== Demographics ==
=== Population ===
At the time of the 2006 National Census, the rural district's population was 5,513 in 1,460 households. There were 5,671 inhabitants in 1,896 households at the following census of 2011. The 2016 census measured the population of the rural district as 5,192 in 1,717 households. The most populous of its 43 villages was Nakatu, with 606 people.

=== Other villages in the rural district ===
- Abu Janlu
- Arkuyen
- Armutlu
- Bahman
- Balvbin
- Chesb
- Chulcheh
- Chulcheh Qeshlaq
- Daydar-e Olya
- Daydar-e Sofla
- Garneh
- Gonbad
- Hajj Qeshlaq
- Kahriz Siyah Mansur
- Khoein
- Najm ol Sheykhan
- Pasha Chay
- Qaderlu
- Qandi Bolagh
- Qara Qayeh
- Qarah Buteh
- Qareh Dowrakhlu-ye Sofla
- Qolqati
- Quriyeh
- Qushchi
- Sain
- Sefid Kamar
- Yengi Kand-e Jame ol Sara
