= Halab, Iran =

City in Zanjan province, Iran

Halab Persian: حلب
- City
- Location within Iran
- Coordinates: 36°17′42″N 48°03′38″E
- Country: Iran
- Province: Zanjan
- County: Ijrud
- District: Halab

Population (2016)
  - Total: 956
- Time zone: UTC+3:30 (IRST)

Halab (Persian: حلب) (Note: Also romanized as Ḩalab; also known as Khalab) is a city in, and the capital of, Halab District in Ijrud County, Zanjan province, Iran. It also serves as the administrative center for Ijrud-e Pain Rural District.

== Demographics ==
=== Population ===
At the time of the 2006 National Census, the city's population was 829 in 218 households. The following census in 2011 counted 1,089 people in 250 households. The 2016 census measured the population of the city as 956 people in 259 households.
