= Arkowyen, Markazi =

Arkowyen اركوين
- Village
- Location within Iran
- Coordinates: 33°55′25″N 49°45′22″E
- Country: Iran
- Province: Markazi
- County: Arak
- Bakhsh: Central
- Rural District: Shamsabad

Population (2006)
  - Total: 239
- Time zone: UTC+3:30 (IRST)
  - Summer (DST): UTC+4:30 (IRDT)

Arkowyen (Persian: اركوين, also Romanized as Arkovīn and Arkevīn; also known as Arkovī and Arkawi) is a village in Shamsabad Rural District, in the Central District of Arak County, Markazi Province, Iran. At the 2006 census, its population was 239, in 71 families.
