= Yengi Kand, Bijar =

Yengi Kand ينگي كند
- Village
- Location within Iran
- Coordinates: 36°12′35″N 47°27′15″E
- Country: Iran
- Province: Kurdistan
- County: Bijar
- Bakhsh: Central
- Rural District: Siyah Mansur

Population (2006)
  - Total: 27
- Time zone: UTC+3:30 (IRST)
  - Summer (DST): UTC+4:30 (IRDT)

Yengi Kand (Persian: ينگي كند, also Romanized as Yengī Kand; also known as Yengeh Kand) is a village in Siyah Mansur Rural District, in the Central District of Bijar County, Kurdistan Province, Iran. At the 2006 census, its population was 27, in 7 families. The village is populated by Azerbaijanis.
