= Khanjyan, Armenia =

Khanjyan Խանջյան
- Location within Armenia
- Coordinates: 40°10′N 44°02′E
- Country: Armenia
- Marz (Province): Armavir
- Founded: 1957

Population (2011)
  - Total: 1,775
- Time zone: UTC+4 ( )
  - Summer (DST): UTC+5 ( )

Khanjyan (Armenian: Խանջյան, also Romanized as Khanjian) is a town in the Armavir Province of Armenia. The town founded as a sovkhoz (collective farm) in 1957. It was named in honor of Aghasi Khanjian, former first secretary of the Communist Party of Armenia and a victim of the Great Purge.

== See also ==
- Armavir Province
