= Ringiste =

Village in Estonia

- Location within Estonia
- Coordinates: 57°43′55″N 26°18′28″E
- Country: Estonia
- County: Valga County
- Time zone: UTC+2 (EET)

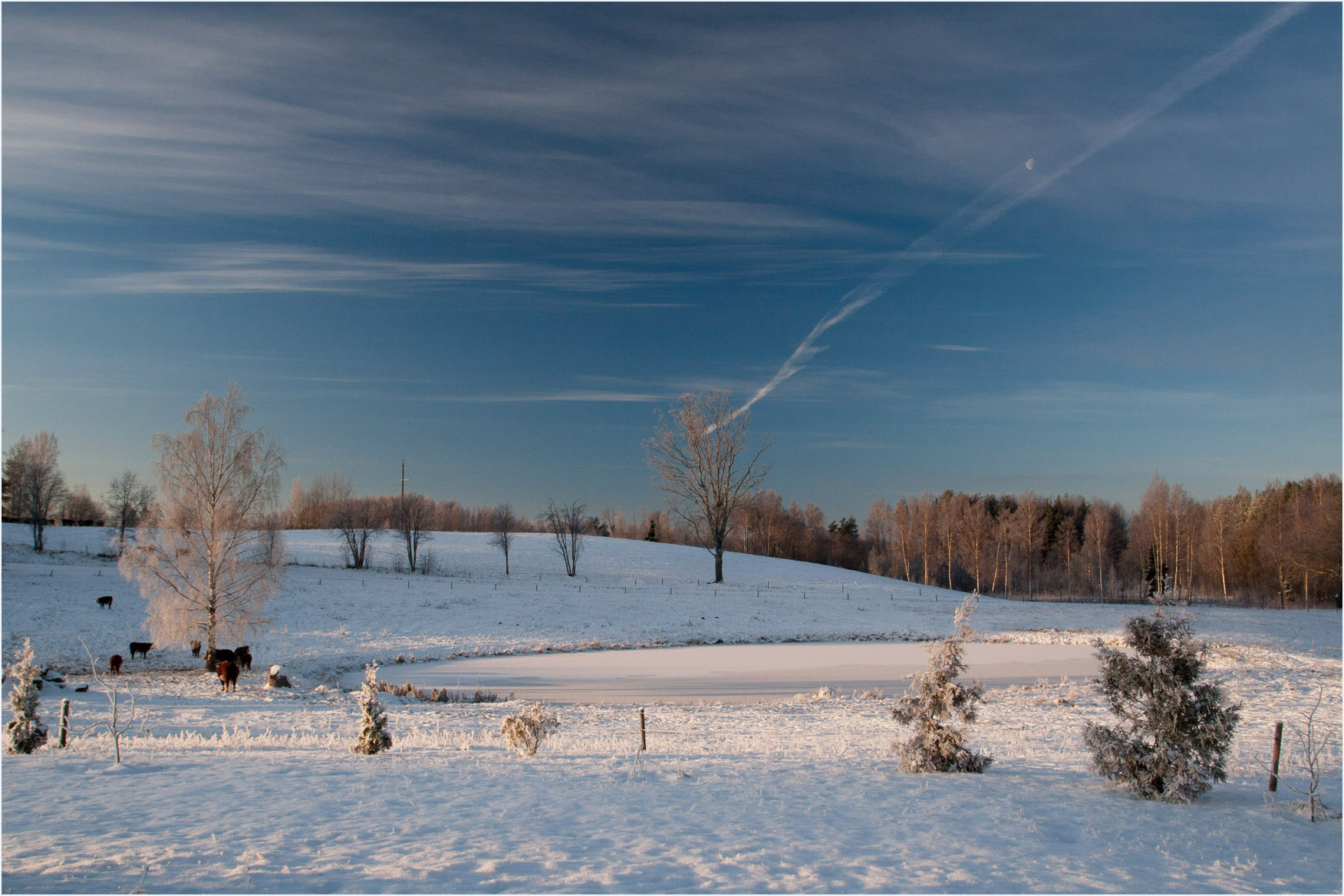
View to Nakatu, part of Ringiste

Ringiste is a settlement in Valga Parish, Valga County in southeastern Estonia.

An area in Ringiste is called Nakatu.
