= Yengi Kand, Hashtrud =

Yengi Kand ینگی‌کند
- Village
- Location within Iran
- Coordinates: 37°30′08″N 46°42′10″E
- Country: Iran
- Province: East Azerbaijan
- County: Hashtrud
- Bakhsh: Central
- Rural District: Qaranqu

Population (2006)
  - Total: 55
- Time zone: UTC+3:30 (IRST)
  - Summer (DST): UTC+4:30 (IRDT)

Yengi Kand (Persian: ینگی‌کند, also Romanized as 'Yengī Kand; also known as Yengī Kandī) is a village in Qaranqu Rural District, in the Central District of Hashtrud County, East Azerbaijan Province, Iran. At the 2006 census, its population was 55, in 11 families.
