= Yengikand, Chang Almas =

Yengikand ينگي كند
- Village
- Location within Iran
- Coordinates: 35°44′32″N 48°04′20″E
- Country: Iran
- Province: Kurdistan
- County: Bijar
- Bakhsh: Chang Almas
- Rural District: Pir Taj

Population (2006)
  - Total: 222
- Time zone: UTC+3:30 (IRST)
  - Summer (DST): UTC+4:30 (IRDT)

Yengikand (Persian: ينگي كند, also Romanized as Yengīkand; also known as Nīkī Kand, Yengī Kandī, and Yengīkhend) is a village in Pir Taj Rural District, Chang Almas District, Bijar County, Kurdistan Province, Iran. At the 2006 census, its population was 222, in 41 families. The village is populated by Azerbaijanis.
