= Yengi Kandi, Meyaneh =

Yengi Kandi ينگي كندي
- Village
- Location within Iran
- Coordinates: 37°35′54″N 47°51′37″E
- Country: Iran
- Province: East Azerbaijan
- County: Meyaneh
- Bakhsh: Central
- Rural District: Garmeh-ye Jonubi

Population (2006)
  - Total: 62
- Time zone: UTC+3:30 (IRST)
  - Summer (DST): UTC+4:30 (IRDT)

Yengi Kandi (Persian: ينگي كندي, also Romanized as Yengī Kandī; also known as Nīgī Kand and Yengī Kand) is a village in Garmeh-ye Jonubi Rural District, in the Central District of Meyaneh County, East Azerbaijan Province, Iran. At the 2006 census, its population was 62, in 14 families.
