= Halab District =

District in Zanjan province, Iran

Halab District Persian: بخش حلب
- District
- Location within Iran
- Coordinates: 36°17′N 48°05′E
- Country: Iran
- Province: Zanjan
- County: Ijrud
- Established: 1997
- Capital: Halab

Population (2016)
  - Total: 6,148
- Time zone: UTC+3:30 (IRST)

Halab District (Persian: بخش حلب) is in Ijrud County, Zanjan province, Iran. Its capital is the city of Halab.

== Demographics ==
=== Population ===
At the time of the 2006 National Census, the district's population was 6,342 in 1,678 households. The following census in 2011 counted 6,760 people in 2,146 households. The 2016 census measured the population of the district as 6,148 inhabitants in 1,976 households.

=== Administrative divisions ===
Halab District Population
| Administrative Divisions | 2006 | 2011 | 2016 |
|---|---|---|---|
| Ijrud-e Pain RD | 5,513 | 5,671 | 5,192 |
| Halab (city) | 829 | 1,089 | 956 |
| Total | 6,342 | 6,760 | 6,148 |
RD = Rural District
