= Central District (Ijrud County) =

District in Zanjan province, Iran

Central District (Ijrud County) Persian: بخش مرکزی شهرستان ایجرود
- District
- Location within Iran
- Coordinates: 36°23′N 48°18′E
- Country: Iran
- Province: Zanjan
- County: Ijrud
- Established: 1997
- Capital: Zarrinabad

Population (2016)
  - Total: 30,493
- Time zone: UTC+3:30 (IRST)

The Central District of Ijrud County (Persian: بخش مرکزی شهرستان ایجرود) is in Zanjan province, Iran. Its capital is the city of Zarrinabad.

== Demographics ==
=== Population ===
At the time of the 2006 National Census, the district's population was 29,319 in 7,351 households. The following census in 2011 counted 31,656 people in 8,906 households. The 2016 census measured the population of the district as 30,493 inhabitants in 9,341 households.

=== Administrative divisions ===
Central District (Ijrud County) Population
Administrative Divisions	2006	2011	2016
Golabar RD	13,644	14,921	14,321
Ijrud-e Bala RD	10,025	10,768	10,570
Saidabad RD	3,706	3,496	3,228
Zarrinabad (city)	1,944	2,471	2,374
Total	29,319	31,656	30,493
RD = Rural District
