= Ijrud County =

County in Zanjan province, Iran

Ijrud County Persian: شهرستان ایجرود
- County
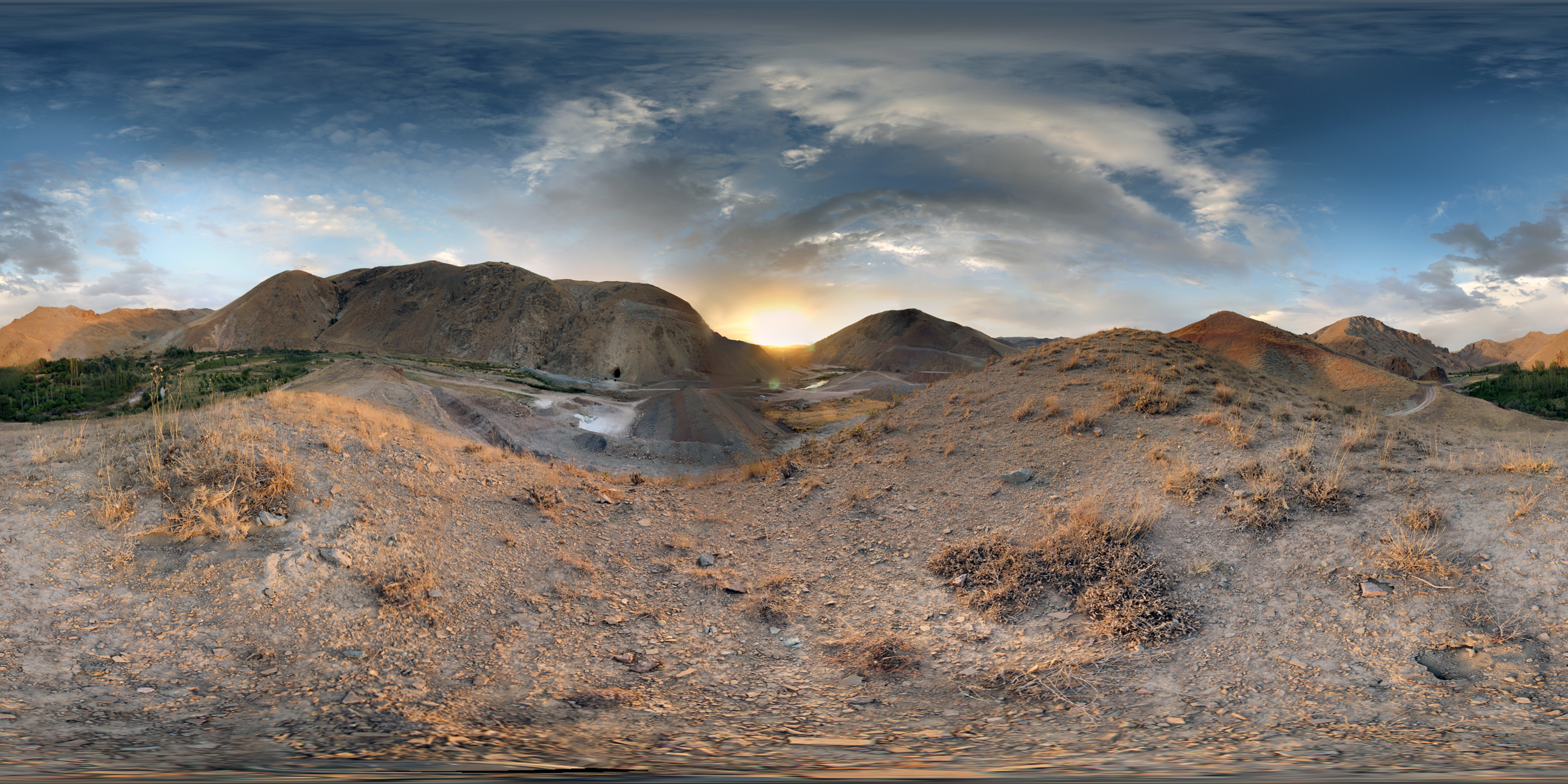

- Location of Ijrud County in Zanjan province (left, purple)

- Location of Zanjan province in Iran
- Coordinates: 36°19′N 48°12′E
- Country: Iran
- Province: Zanjan
- Established: 1997
- Capital: Zarrinabad
- Districts: Central, Halab

Population (2016)
  - Total: 36,641
- Time zone: UTC+3:30 (IRST)

Ijrud County (Persian: شهرستان ایجرود) is in Zanjan province, Iran. Its capital is the city of Zarrinabad.

== Demographics ==
=== Population ===
At the time of the 2006 National Census, the county's population was 35,661 in 9,029 households. The following census in 2011 counted 38,416 people in 11,042 households. The 2016 census measured the population of the county as 36,641 in 11,317 households.

=== Administrative divisions ===
Ijrud County's population history and administrative structure over three consecutive censuses are shown in the following table.

Ijrud County Population
Administrative Divisions	2006	2011	2016
Central District	29,319	31,656	30,493
Golabar RD	13,644	14,921	14,321
Ijrud-e Bala RD	10,025	10,768	10,570
Saidabad RD	3,706	3,496	3,228
Zarrinabad (city)	1,944	2,471	2,374
Halab District	6,342	6,760	6,148
Ijrud-e Pain RD	5,513	5,671	5,192
Halab (city)	829	1,089	956
Total	35,661	38,416	36,641
RD = Rural District

== See also ==
Media related to Ijrud County at Wikimedia Commons
