= Esmailabad =

Esmailabad or Esmaeelabad oder Isma′ilabad (Persian: اسماعيل آباد) may refer to:

== Alborz Province ==
- Esmailabad, Alborz
- Esmailabad Shur Qaleh-ye Bala, Alborz
- Esmailabad Shur Qaleh-ye Pain, Alborz

== Chaharmahal and Bakhtiari Province ==
- Esmailabad, Chaharmahal and Bakhtiari, a village in Kuhrang County

== East Azerbaijan Province ==
- Esmailabad, East Azerbaijan, a village in Sarab County

== Fars Province ==
- Esmailabad, Bavanat, a village in Bavanat County
- Esmailabad, Darab, a village in Darab County
- Esmailabad, Jahrom, a village in Jahrom County
- Esmailabad, Kharameh, a village in Kharameh County
- Esmailabad, Marvdasht, a village in Marvdasht County
- Esmailabad (south), Dorudzan, a village in Marvdasht County
- Esmailabad (north), Dorudzan, a village in Marvdasht County
- Esmailabad, Seyyedan, a village in Marvdasht County
- Esmailabad, Shiraz, a village in Shiraz County
- Esmailabad, Zarqan, a village in Shiraz County

== Gilan Province ==
- Esmailabad, Gilan, a village in Rasht County

== Golestan Province ==
- Esmailabad, Golestan

== Kerman Province ==
- Esmailabad, Bardsir, a village in Bardsir County
- Esmailabad, Fahraj, a village in Fahraj County
- Esmailabad, Kerman, a village in Kerman County
- Esmailabad, Mahan, a village in Kerman County
- Esmailabad, Rafsanjan, a village in Rafsanjan County
- Esmailabad, Ferdows, a village in Rafsanjan County
- Esmailabad, Ravar, a village in Ravar County
- Esmailabad, Zarand, a village in Zarand County

== Kermanshah Province ==
- Esmailabad, Kermanshah, a village in Sarpol-e Zahab County

== Khuzestan Province ==
- Esmailabad, Khuzestan, a village in Gotvand County

== Lorestan Province ==
- Esmailabad, Lorestan

== Markazi Province ==
- Esmailabad, Saveh, a village in Saveh County
- Esmailabad, Zarandieh, a village in Zarandieh County

== North Khorasan Province ==
- Esmailabad, North Khorasan

== Qazvin Province ==
- Esmailabad, Qazvin
- Esmailabad, Buin Zahra, Qazvin

== Razavi Khorasan Province ==
- Esmailabad, Bardaskan, a village in Bardaskan County
- Esmailabad, Jowayin, a village in Jowayin County
- Esmailabad, Mashhad, a village in Mashhad County
- Esmailabad, Tus, a village in Mashhad County
- Esmailabad, Torbat-e Jam, a village in Torbat-e Jam County
- Esmailabad, Pain Jam, a village in Torbat-e Jam County
- Esmailabad-e Gorji, a village in Torbat-e Jam County
- Esmailabad, Zaveh, a village in Zaveh County

== Sistan and Baluchestan Province ==
- Esmailabad (south), Gowhar Kuh, a village in Khash County
- Esmailabad (north), Gowhar Kuh, a village in Khash County
- Esmailabad Rural District (Sistan and Baluchestan Province)

== South Khorasan Province ==
- Esmailabad, Darmian, a village in Darmian County
- Esmailabad, Nehbandan, a village in Nehbandan County
- Esmailabad, Qaen, a village in Qaen County
- Esmailabad, Tabas, a village in Tabas County

== Tehran Province ==
- Esmailabad, Rey, a village in Rey County
- Esmailabad-e Moin
- Esmailabad Rural District (Baharestan County)

== West Azerbaijan Province ==
- Esmailabad, West Azerbaijan, a village in Poldasht County
