= Kahrizak, Alborz =

Village in Alborz province, Iran

Kahrizak Persian: كهريزك
- Village
- Location within Iran
- Coordinates: 35°49′29″N 50°42′31″E
- Country: Iran
- Province: Alborz
- County: Chaharbagh
- District: Ramjin
- Rural District: Aghlan Tappeh

Population (2016)
  - Total: 1,072
- Time zone: UTC+3:30 (IRST)

Kahrizak (Persian: كهريزك) (Note: Also romanized as Kahrīzak) is a village in Aghlan Tappeh Rural District of Ramjin District in Chaharbagh County, Alborz province, Iran.

== Demographics ==
=== Population ===
At the time of the 2006 National Census, the village's population was 659 in 160 households, when it was in Ramjin Rural District of Chaharbagh District (Note: Renamed the Central District of Chaharbagh County) in Savojbolagh County, Tehran province. The 2016 census measured the population of the village as 1,072 in 332 households, by which time the county had been separated from the province in the establishment of Alborz province.

In 2020, the district was separated from the county in establishing Chaharbagh County and renamed the Central District. The rural district was transferred to the new Ramjin District, and Kahrizak was transferred to Aghlan Tappeh Rural District created in the district.
