= Sonqorabad, Alborz =

Village in Alborz province, Iran

Sonqorabad Persian: سنقراباد
- Village
- Location within Iran
- Coordinates: 35°51′33″N 50°47′14″E
- Country: Iran
- Province: Alborz
- County: Chaharbagh
- District: Central
- Rural District: Chahardangeh

Population (2016)
  - Total: 1,777
- Time zone: UTC+3:30 (IRST)

Sonqorabad (Persian: سنقرآباد) (Note: Also romanized as Sonqorābād) is a village in, and the capital of, Chahardangeh Rural District in the Central District (Note: Formerly Chaharbagh District of Savojbolagh County) The previous capital of the rural district was the village of Chahar Dangeh, now the city of Chaharbagh.

== Demographics ==
=== Population ===
At the time of the 2006 National Census, the village's population was 1,376 in 337 households, when it was in Ramjin Rural District of Chaharbagh District (Note: Renamed the Central District of Chaharbagh County) in Savojbolagh County, Tehran province. The 2016 census measured the population of the village as 1,777 people in 564 households, by which time the county had been separated from the province in the establishment of Alborz province.

In 2020, the district was separated from the county in establishing Chaharbagh County and renamed the Central District. The rural district was transferred to the new Ramjin District, and Sonqorabad was transferred to Chahardangeh Rural District of the Central District.
