= Aghlan Tappeh =

Village in Alborz province, Iran

Aghlan Tappeh Persian: اغلان تپه
- Village
- Location within Iran
- Coordinates: 35°50′27″N 50°42′50″E
- Country: Iran
- Province: Alborz
- County: Chaharbagh
- District: Ramjin
- Rural District: Aghlan Tappeh

Population (2016)
  - Total: 2,085
- Time zone: UTC+3:30 (IRST)

Aghlan Tappeh (Persian: اغلان تپه) (Note: Also romanized as Oghlan Tappeh and Oghlān Tappeh; also known as Owghlān Tappeh and Uqlān Tepe) is a village in, and the capital of, Aghlan Tappeh Rural District in Ramjin District of Chaharbagh County, Alborz province, Iran.

== Demographics ==
=== Population ===
At the time of the 2006 National Census, the village's population was 1,480 in 369 households, when it was in Ramjin Rural District of Chaharbagh District (Note: Renamed the Central District of Chaharbagh County) in Savojbolagh County, Tehran province. The 2016 census measured the population of the village as 2,085 in 635 households, by which time the county had been separated from the province in the establishment of Alborz province.

In 2020, the district was separated from the county in establishing Chaharbagh County and renamed the Central District. The rural district was transferred to the new Ramjin District, and Aghlan Tappeh was transferred to Aghlan Tappeh Rural District created in the district.
