= Zafaraniyeh, Alborz =

Village in Alborz province, Iran

Zafaraniyeh Persian: زعفرانيه
- Village
- Location within Iran
- Coordinates: 35°49′03″N 50°41′16″E
- Country: Iran
- Province: Alborz
- County: Chaharbagh
- District: Ramjin
- Rural District: Aghlan Tappeh

Population (2016)
  - Total: 146
- Time zone: UTC+3:30 (IRST)

Zafaraniyeh (Persian: زعفرانيه) (Note: Also romanized as Zaʿfarānīyeh) is a village in Aghlan Tappeh Rural District of Ramjin District in Chaharbagh County, Alborz province, Iran.

== Demographics ==
=== Population ===
At the time of the 2006 National Census, the village's population was 107 in 34 households, when it was in Ramjin Rural District of Chaharbagh District (Note: Renamed the Central District of Chaharbagh County) in Savojbolagh County, Tehran province. The 2016 census measured the population of the village as 146 in 56 households, by which time the county had been separated from the province in the establishment of Alborz province.

In 2020, the district was separated from the county in establishing Chaharbagh County and renamed the Central District. The rural district was transferred to the new Ramjin District, and Zafaraniyeh was transferred to Aghlan Tappeh Rural District created in the district.
