= Aghcheh Hesar =

Village in Alborz province, Iran

Aghcheh Hesar Persian: اغچه حصار
- Village
- Location within Iran
- Coordinates: 35°50′20″N 50°44′05″E
- Country: Iran
- Province: Alborz
- County: Chaharbagh
- District: Ramjin
- Rural District: Aghlan Tappeh

Population (2016)
  - Total: 1,472
- Time zone: UTC+3:30 (IRST)

Aghcheh Hesar (Persian: اغچه حصار) (Note: Also romanized as Āghcheh Ḩeşār) is a village in Aghlan Tappeh Rural District of Ramjin District in Chaharbagh County, Alborz province, Iran.

== Demographics ==
=== Population ===
At the time of the 2006 National Census, the village's population was 1,049 in 267 households, when it was in Ramjin Rural District of Chaharbagh District (Note: Renamed the Central District of Chaharbagh County) in Savojbolagh County, Tehran province. The 2016 census measured the population of the village as 1,472 in 449 households, by which time the county had been separated from the province in the establishment of Alborz province.

In 2020, the district was separated from the county in establishing Chaharbagh County and renamed the Central District. The rural district was transferred to the new Ramjin District, and Aghcheh Hesar was transferred to Aghlan Tappeh Rural District created in the district.
