= Yaqubabad, Alborz =

Village in Alborz province, Iran

Yaqubabad Persian: يعقوباباد
- Village
- Location within Iran
- Coordinates: 35°50′24″N 50°39′59″E
- Country: Iran
- Province: Alborz
- County: Chaharbagh
- District: Ramjin
- Rural District: Aghlan Tappeh

Population (2016)
  - Total: 96
- Time zone: UTC+3:30 (IRST)

Yaqubabad (Persian: يعقوباباد) (Note: Also romanized as Ya‘qūbābād; also known as Ya‘qūbābād-e Kheyrābād) is a village in Aghlan Tappeh Rural District of Ramjin District in Chaharbagh County, Alborz province, Iran.

== Demographics ==
=== Population ===
At the time of the 2006 National Census, the village's population was 77 in 24 households, when it was in Ramjin Rural District of Chaharbagh District (Note: Renamed the Central District of Chaharbagh County) in Savojbolagh County, Tehran province. The 2016 census measured the population of the village as 96 in 31 households, by which time the county had been separated from the province in the establishment of Alborz province.

In 2020, the district was separated from the county in establishing Chaharbagh County and renamed the Central District. The rural district was transferred to the new Ramjin District, and Yaqubabad was transferred to Aghlan Tappeh Rural District created in the district.
