= Zakiabad, Alborz =

Village in Alborz province, Iran

Zakiabad Persian: زكي اباد
- Village
- Location within Iran
- Coordinates: 35°50′08″N 50°40′37″E
- Country: Iran
- Province: Alborz
- County: Chaharbagh
- District: Ramjin
- Rural District: Aghlan Tappeh

Population (2016)
  - Total: 1,306
- Time zone: UTC+3:30 (IRST)

Zakiabad (Persian: زكي اباد) (Note: Also romanized as Zakīābād, Zakkiābād, and Zekīābād) is a village in Aghlan Tappeh Rural District of Ramjin District in Chaharbagh County, Alborz province, Iran.

== Demographics ==
=== Population ===
At the time of the 2006 National Census, the village's population was 1,051 in 286 households, when it was in Ramjin Rural District of Chaharbagh District (Note: Renamed the Central District of Chaharbagh County) in Savojbolagh County, Tehran province. The 2016 census measured the population of the village as 1,306 in 458 households, by which time the county had been separated from the province in the establishment of Alborz province.

In 2020, the district was separated from the county in establishing Chaharbagh County and renamed the Central District. The rural district was transferred to the new Ramjin District, and Zakiabad was transferred to Aghlan Tappeh Rural District created in the district.
