= Dehkadeh-ye Taleqani =

Village in Alborz province, Iran

Dehkadeh-ye Taleqani Persian: دهكده طالقاني
- Village
- Location within Iran
- Coordinates: 35°53′30″N 50°50′27″E
- Country: Iran
- Province: Alborz
- County: Chaharbagh
- District: Ramjin
- Rural District: Ramjin

Population (2016)
  - Total: 459
- Time zone: UTC+3:30 (IRST)

Dehkadeh-ye Taleqani (Persian: دهكده طالقاني) (Note: Also romanized as Dehkadeh-ye Ţāleqānī) is a village in Ramjin Rural District of Ramjin District in Chaharbagh County, Alborz province, Iran.

== Demographics ==
=== Population ===
At the time of the 2006 National Census, the village's population was 319 in 82 households, when it was in Chaharbagh District (Note: Renamed the Central District of Chaharbagh County) of Savojbolagh County, Tehran province. The 2016 census measured the population of the village as 406 in 140 households, by which time the county had been separated from the province in the establishment of Alborz province.

In 2020, the district was separated from the county in the establishment of Chaharbagh County and renamed the Central District. The rural district was transferred to the new Ramjin District.
