= Nəmirli =

Nəmirli or Namirli or Namarly or Namirly or Namerli may refer to:

- Nəmirli, Agdam, Azerbaijan
- Nəmirli, Agsu, Azerbaijan
- Nəmirli, Yevlakh, Azerbaijan
