= Soltanabad, Alborz =

Village in Alborz province, Iran

Soltanabad Persian: سلطان اباد
- Village
- Location within Iran
- Coordinates: 35°48′13″N 50°49′37″E
- Country: Iran
- Province: Alborz
- County: Chaharbagh
- District: Central
- Rural District: Arababad-e Afshar

Population (2016)
  - Total: 867
- Time zone: UTC+3:30 (IRST)

Soltanabad (Persian: سلطان اباد) (Note: Also romanized as Solţānābād and Sultānābād) is a village in Arababad-e Afshar Rural District of the Central District (Note: Formerly Chaharbagh District of Savojbolagh County) in Chaharbagh County, Alborz province, Iran.

== Demographics ==
=== Population ===
At the time of the 2006 National Census, the village's population was 431, in 102 households, when it was in Chahardangeh Rural District of Chaharbagh District (Note: Renamed the Central District of Chaharbagh County) in Savojbolagh County, Tehran province. The 2016 census measured the population of the village as 867 in 245 households, by which time the county had been separated from the province in the establishment of Alborz province.

In 2020, the district was separated from the county in establishing Chaharbagh County and renamed the Central District. Soltanabad was transferred to Arababad-e Afshar Rural District created in the district.
