= Malekabad-e Hammanlu =

Neighborhood in Alborz province, Iran

Malekabad-e Hammanlu Persian: ملك ابادحمام لو
- Neighborhood
- Location within Iran
- Coordinates: 35°48′54″N 50°49′25″E
- Country: Iran
- Province: Alborz
- County: Chaharbagh
- District: Central
- City: Chaharbagh

Population (2006)
  - Total: 15,296
- Time zone: UTC+3:30 (IRST)

Malekabad-e Hammanlu (Persian: ملك ابادحمام لو) (Note: Also romanized as Malekābād) is a neighborhood in the city of Chaharbagh in the Central District (Note: Formerly Chaharbagh District of Savojbolagh County) of Chaharbagh County, Alborz province, Iran.

== Demographics ==
=== Population ===
At the time of the 2006 National Census, Malekabad-e Hammanlu's population was 15,296 in 3,717 households, when it was a village in Chahardangeh Rural District of Chaharbagh District (Note: Renamed the Central District of Chaharbagh County) in Savojbolagh County, Tehran province. The village did not appear in the census of 2016, by which time the county had been separated from the province in the establishment of Alborz province.

In 2020, the district was separated from the county in establishing Chaharbagh County and renamed the Central District. Chaharbagh became the new county's capital.
