= Shahdabad =

Village in Razavi Khorasan province, Iran

Shahdabad Persian: شهداباد
- Village
- Location within Iran
- Coordinates: 35°09′02″N 60°54′20″E
- Country: Iran
- Province: Razavi Khorasan
- County: Torbat-e Jam
- District: Pain Jam
- Rural District: Zam

Population (2016)
  - Total: 1,089
- Time zone: UTC+3:30 (IRST)

Shahdabad (Persian: شهداباد) (Note: Also romanized as Shahdābād; also known as Shāhtābād) is a village in Zam Rural District (Note: Formerly Pain Jam Rural District) of Pain Jam District in Torbat-e Jam County, Razavi Khorasan province, Iran.

== Demographics ==
=== Population ===
At the time of the 2006 National Census, the village's population was 908 in 202 households. The following census in 2011 counted 929 people in 218 households. The 2016 census measured the population of the village as 1,089 people in 290 households.
