= Aliabad, Pain Jam =

Village in Razavi Khorasan province, Iran

Aliabad Persian: علي اباد
- Village
- Location within Iran
- Coordinates: 35°10′11″N 60°49′04″E
- Country: Iran
- Province: Razavi Khorasan
- County: Torbat-e Jam
- District: Pain Jam
- Rural District: Gol Banu

Population (2016)
  - Total: 443
- Time zone: UTC+3:30 (IRST)

Aliabad (Persian: علي اباد) (Note: Also romanized as ‘Alīābād) is a village in, and the capital of, Gol Banu Rural District in Pain Jam District of Torbat-e Jam County, Razavi Khorasan province, Iran.

== Demographics ==
=== Population ===
At the time of the 2006 National Census, the village's population was 402 in 89 households. The following census in 2011 counted 419 people in 96 households. The 2016 census measured the population of the village as 443 people in 122 households.
