= Ahmadabad-e Banakdar =

Village in Razavi Khorasan province, Iran

Ahmadabad-e Banakdar Persian: احمدابادبنكدار
- Village
- Location within Iran
- Coordinates: 35°09′50″N 60°50′47″E
- Country: Iran
- Province: Razavi Khorasan
- County: Torbat-e Jam
- District: Pain Jam
- Rural District: Gol Banu

Population (2016)
  - Total: 67
- Time zone: UTC+3:30 (IRST)

Ahmadabad-e Banakdar (Persian: احمدابادبنكدار) (Note: Also romanized as Aḩmadābād-e Banaḵdār; also known as Aḩmadābād) is a village in Gol Banu Rural District of Pain Jam District in Torbat-e Jam County, Razavi Khorasan province, Iran.

== Demographics ==
=== Population ===
At the time of the 2006 National Census, the village's population was 11 in four households. The village did not appear in the following census of 2011. The 2016 census measured the population of the village as 67 people in 18 households.
