= Esmailabad Shur Qaleh =

Esmailabad Shur Qaleh (Persian: اسمعيل ابادشورقلعه) may refer to:

- Esmailabad Shur Qaleh-ye Bala
- Esmailabad Shur Qaleh-ye Pain
