= Ramjin =

Village in Alborz province, Iran

Ramjin Persian: رامجين
- Village
- Location within Iran
- Coordinates: 35°50′06″N 50°46′00″E
- Country: Iran
- Province: Alborz
- County: Chaharbagh
- District: Ramjin
- Rural District: Ramjin

Population (2016)
  - Total: 1,999
- Time zone: UTC+3:30 (IRST)

Ramjin (Persian: رامجين) (Note: Also romanized as Rāmjīn; also known as Ramandeh) is a village in Ramjin Rural District of Ramjin District in Chaharbagh County, Alborz province, Iran, serving as capital of both the district and the rural district.

== Demographics ==
=== Population ===
At the time of the 2006 National Census, the village's population was 1,902 in 456 households, when it was in Chaharbagh District (Note: Renamed the Central District of Chaharbagh County) of Savojbolagh County, Tehran province. The 2016 census measured the population of the village as 1,999 in 673 households, by which time the county had been separated from the province in the establishment of Alborz province.

In 2020, the district was separated from the county in establishing Chaharbagh County and renamed the Central District. The rural district was transferred to the new Ramjin District.
