= Allahabad, Torbat-e Jam =

Village in Razavi Khorasan province, Iran

Allahabad Persian: اله اباد
- Village
- Location within Iran
- Coordinates: 35°10′02″N 60°50′00″E
- Country: Iran
- Province: Razavi Khorasan
- County: Torbat-e Jam
- District: Pain Jam
- Rural District: Gol Banu

Population (2016)
  - Total: 622
- Time zone: UTC+3:30 (IRST)

Allahabad (Persian: اله اباد) (Note: Also romanized as Allāhābād) is a village in Gol Banu Rural District of Pain Jam District in Torbat-e Jam County, Razavi Khorasan province, Iran.

== Demographics ==
=== Population ===
At the time of the 2006 National Census, the village's population was 423 in 89 households. The following census in 2011 counted 676 people in 169 households. The 2016 census measured the population of the village as 622 people in 168 households.
