= Khalili, Razavi Khorasan =

Village in Razavi Khorasan province, Iran

Khalili Persian: خليلي
- Village
- Location within Iran
- Coordinates: 35°06′56″N 60°51′57″E
- Country: Iran
- Province: Razavi Khorasan
- County: Torbat-e Jam
- District: Buzhgan
- Rural District: Harirud

Population (2016)
  - Total: 1,021
- Time zone: UTC+3:30 (IRST)

Khalili (Persian: خليلي) (Note: also romanized as Khalīlī; also known as Khalīlīhā) is a village in Harirud Rural District of Buzhgan District in Torbat-e Jam County, Razavi Khorasan province, Iran.

== Demographics ==
=== Population ===
At the time of the 2006 National Census, the village's population was 776 in 168 households. The following census in 2011 counted 850 people in 226 households. The 2016 census measured the population of the village as 1,021 people in 288 households. It was the most populous village in its rural district.
