= Dowlatabad, Torbat-e Jam =

Village in Razavi Khorasan province, Iran

Dowlatabad Persian: دولت آباد
- Village
- Location within Iran
- Coordinates: 35°05′34″N 60°52′42″E
- Country: Iran
- Province: Razavi Khorasan
- County: Torbat-e Jam
- District: Buzhgan
- Rural District: Harirud

Population (2016)
  - Total: 427
- Time zone: UTC+3:30 (IRST)

Dowlatabad (Persian: دولت آباد) (Note: Also romanized as Dowlatābād; also known as Daulatābād and Ḩājjīābād-e Mollā Yaʿqūb (حاجي آبادملايعقوب)) is a village in, and the capital of, Harirud Rural District in Buzhgan District of Torbat-e Jam County, Razavi Khorasan province, Iran.

== Demographics ==
=== Population ===
At the time of the 2006 National Census, the village's population was 319 in 58 households. The following census in 2011 counted 556 people in 133 households. The 2016 census measured the population of the village as 427 people in 132 households.
