= Yadegar =

Yadegar (Persian: يادگار, meaning "memorial") may refer to:

- Yadegar, Lorestan
- Yadegar, Razavi Khorasan
- Yadegar-e Olya, Razavi Khorasan Province
- Yadegar-e Sofla, Razavi Khorasan Province
