= Hoseynabad-e Kalali =

Village in Razavi Khorasan province, Iran

Hoseynabad-e Kalali Persian: حسين ابادكلالي
- Village
- Location within Iran
- Coordinates: 35°09′03″N 60°48′56″E
- Country: Iran
- Province: Razavi Khorasan
- County: Torbat-e Jam
- District: Pain Jam
- Rural District: Gol Banu

Population (2016)
  - Total: 648
- Time zone: UTC+3:30 (IRST)

Hoseynabad-e Kalali (Persian: حسين ابادكلالي) (Note: Also romanized as Ḩoseynābād-e Kalālī) is a village in Gol Banu Rural District of Pain Jam District in Torbat-e Jam County, Razavi Khorasan province, Iran.

== Demographics ==
=== Population ===
At the time of the 2006 National Census, the village's population was 460 in 102 households. The following census in 2011 counted 528 people in 136 households. The 2016 census measured the population of the village as 648 people in 195 households.
