= Jahanabad, Buzhgan =

Village in Razavi Khorasan province, Iran

Jahanabad Persian: جهان اباد
- Village
- Location within Iran
- Coordinates: 35°06′31″N 60°53′10″E
- Country: Iran
- Province: Razavi Khorasan
- County: Torbat-e Jam
- District: Buzhgan
- Rural District: Harirud

Population (2016)
  - Total: 539
- Time zone: UTC+3:30 (IRST)

Jahanabad (Persian: جهان اباد) (Note: Also romanized as Jahānābād) is a village in Harirud Rural District of Buzhgan District in Torbat-e Jam County, Razavi Khorasan province, Iran.

== Demographics ==
=== Population ===
At the time of the 2006 National Census, the village's population was 514 in 117 households. The following census in 2011 counted 563 people in 139 households. The 2016 census measured the population of the village as 539 people in 165 households.
