= Kalateh-ye Abd ol Samad =

Village in Razavi Khorasan province, Iran

Kalateh-ye Abd ol Samad Persian: كلاته عبد الصمد
- Village
- Location within Iran
- Coordinates: 35°03′33″N 60°55′46″E
- Country: Iran
- Province: Razavi Khorasan
- County: Torbat-e Jam
- District: Buzhgan
- Rural District: Harirud

Population (2016)
  - Total: 373
- Time zone: UTC+3:30 (IRST)

Kalateh-ye Abd ol Samad (Persian: كلاته عبد الصمد) (Note: Also romanized as Kalāteh-ye ‘Abd ol Şamad; also known as Ḩājjīābād Mollā Qāsem, Kalāteh-ye ‘Abd oş Şamad, and Kalāteh-ye Ḩājjī Ākhūnd (كلاته حاجي اخوند)) is a village in Harirud Rural District of Buzhgan District in Torbat-e Jam County, Razavi Khorasan province, Iran.

== Demographics ==
=== Population ===
At the time of the 2006 National Census, the village's population was 267 in 59 households. The following census in 2011 counted 303 people in 70 households. The 2016 census measured the population of the village as 373 people in 101 households.
