= Gav Cheshmeh =

Village in Razavi Khorasan province, Iran

Gav Cheshmeh Persian: گاوچشمه
- Village
- Location within Iran
- Coordinates: 35°01′22″N 60°58′10″E
- Country: Iran
- Province: Razavi Khorasan
- County: Torbat-e Jam
- District: Buzhgan
- Rural District: Harirud

Population (2016)
  - Total: 47
- Time zone: UTC+3:30 (IRST)

Gav Cheshmeh (Persian: گاوچشمه) (Note: Also romanized as Gāv Cheshmeh) is a village in Harirud Rural District of Buzhgan District in Torbat-e Jam County, Razavi Khorasan province, Iran.

== Demographics ==
=== Population ===
At the time of the 2006 National Census, the village's population was 127 in 29 households. The following census in 2011 counted 80 people in 20 households. The 2016 census measured the population of the village as 47 people in 14 households.
