= Eslamabad, Torbat-e Jam =

Village in Razavi Khorasan province, Iran

Eslamabad Persian: اسلام اباد
- Village
- Location within Iran
- Coordinates: 35°09′17″N 60°47′26″E
- Country: Iran
- Province: Razavi Khorasan
- County: Torbat-e Jam
- District: Pain Jam
- Rural District: Gol Banu

Population (2016)
  - Total: 773
- Time zone: UTC+3:30 (IRST)

Eslamabad (Persian: اسلام اباد) (Note: Also romanized as Eslāmābād; also known as Chahār Man Nīm (چهارمن نيم)) is a village in Gol Banu Rural District of Pain Jam District in Torbat-e Jam County, Razavi Khorasan province, Iran.

== Demographics ==
=== Population ===
At the time of the 2006 National Census, the village's population was 544 in 126 households. The following census in 2011 counted 638 people in 174 households. The 2016 census measured the population of the village as 773 people in 212 households.
