= Kalateh-ye Sanam =

Village in Razavi Khorasan province, Iran

Kalateh-ye Sanam Persian: كلاته صنم
- Village
- Location within Iran
- Coordinates: 35°10′48″N 60°50′14″E
- Country: Iran
- Province: Razavi Khorasan
- County: Torbat-e Jam
- District: Pain Jam
- Rural District: Gol Banu

Population (2016)
  - Total: 131
- Time zone: UTC+3:30 (IRST)

Kalateh-ye Sanam (Persian: كلاته صنم) (Note: Also romanized as Kalāteh Şanam and Kalāteh-ye Şanam; also known as Kalāteh-ye Nūr Moḩammad Shādī) is a village in Gol Banu Rural District of Pain Jam District in Torbat-e Jam County, Razavi Khorasan province, Iran.

== Demographics ==
=== Population ===
At the time of the 2006 National Census, the village's population was 126 in 32 households. The following census in 2011 counted 146 people in 40 households. The 2016 census measured the population of the village as 131 people in 35 households.
