= Yadegar-e Ali Khvajeh =

Yadegar-e Ali Khvajeh (Persian: یادگار علی خواجه) may refer to:

- Yadegar-e Ali Khvajeh-ye Olya
- Yadegar-e Ali Khvajeh-ye Sofla
