= Lashkarabad (disambiguation) =

Lashkarabad (Persian: لشکر آباد) may refer to several places in Iran:

- Lashkarabad, a village in Chaharbagh County, Alborz province
- Shekarabad, Delfan, a village whose alternate name is Lashkarabad in Delfan County, Lorestan province
- Shokrabad, Tehran, a village whose alternate name is Lashkarabad in Tehran County, Tehran province
