= Robat, Torbat-e Jam =

Village in Razavi Khorasan province, Iran

Robat Persian: رباط
- Village
- Location within Iran
- Coordinates: 35°04′55″N 60°53′44″E
- Country: Iran
- Province: Razavi Khorasan
- County: Torbat-e Jam
- District: Buzhgan
- Rural District: Harirud

Population (2016)
  - Total: 887
- Time zone: UTC+3:30 (IRST)

Robat (Persian: رباط) (Note: Also romanized as Robāţ; also known as Aḩmadābād) is a village in Harirud Rural District of Buzhgan District in Torbat-e Jam County, Razavi Khorasan province, Iran.

== Demographics ==
=== Population ===
At the time of the 2006 National Census, the village's population was 585 in 124 households. The following census in 2011 counted 818 people in 199 households. The 2016 census measured the population of the village as 887 people in 238 households.
