= Hoseyn-e Aqa Beyk =

Village in Razavi Khorasan province, Iran

Hoseyn-e Aqa Beyk Persian: حسين اقابيك
- Village
- Location within Iran
- Coordinates: 35°10′27″N 60°52′03″E
- Country: Iran
- Province: Razavi Khorasan
- County: Torbat-e Jam
- District: Pain Jam
- Rural District: Gol Banu

Population (2016)
  - Total: 332
- Time zone: UTC+3:30 (IRST)

Hoseyn-e Aqa Beyk (Persian: حسين اقابيك) (Note: Also romanized as Ḩoseyn Āqā Beyk and Ḩoseyn-e Āqā Beyk; also known as Ḩasanābād-e Āqā Beyk and Ḩoseynābād-e Āqā Beyk (حسين اباد اقابيك)) is a village in Gol Banu Rural District of Pain Jam District in Torbat-e Jam County, Razavi Khorasan province, Iran.

== Demographics ==
=== Population ===
At the time of the 2006 National Census, the village's population was 376 in 71 households. The following census in 2011 counted 328 people in 70 households. The 2016 census measured the population of the village as 332 people in 90 households.
