= Mansuriyeh, Torbat-e Jam =

Village in Razavi Khorasan province, Iran

Mansuriyeh Persian: منصوريه
- Village
- Location within Iran
- Coordinates: 35°06′06″N 60°51′00″E
- Country: Iran
- Province: Razavi Khorasan
- County: Torbat-e Jam
- District: Buzhgan
- Rural District: Harirud

Population (2016)
  - Total: 429
- Time zone: UTC+3:30 (IRST)

Mansuriyeh (Persian: منصوريه) (Note: Also romanized as Manşūrīyeh; also known as Qal‘eh-ye Manşūrīā) is a village in Harirud Rural District of Buzhgan District in Torbat-e Jam County, Razavi Khorasan province, Iran.

== Demographics ==
=== Population ===
At the time of the 2006 National Census, the village's population was 449 in 101 households. The following census in 2011 counted 376 people in 87 households. The 2016 census measured the population of the village as 429 people in 125 households.
