= Ahianu =

Village in Razavi Khorasan province, Iran

Ahianu Persian: احيانو
- Village
- Location within Iran
- Coordinates: 35°11′37″N 60°49′33″E
- Country: Iran
- Province: Razavi Khorasan
- County: Torbat-e Jam
- District: Pain Jam
- Rural District: Gol Banu

Population (2016)
  - Total: 212
- Time zone: UTC+3:30 (IRST)

Ahianu (Persian: احيانو) (Note: Also romanized as Āḥīānū) is a village in Gol Banu Rural District of Pain Jam District in Torbat-e Jam County, Razavi Khorasan province, Iran.

== Demographics ==
=== Population ===
At the time of the 2006 National Census, the village's population was 176 in 35 households. The following census in 2011 counted 162 people in 34 households. The 2016 census measured the population of the village as 212 people in 53 households.
