= Hasana-ye Hajjiabad-e Hajji Ebrahim =

Village in Razavi Khorasan province, Iran

Hasana-ye Hajjiabad-e Hajji Ebrahim Persian: حسناحاجي آبادابراهيم
- Village
- Location within Iran
- Coordinates: 35°05′53″N 60°52′26″E
- Country: Iran
- Province: Razavi Khorasan
- County: Torbat-e Jam
- District: Buzhgan
- Rural District: Harirud

Population (2016)
  - Total: 272
- Time zone: UTC+3:30 (IRST)

Hasana-ye Hajjiabad-e Hajji Ebrahim (Persian: حسناحاجي آبادابراهيم) (Note: Also romanized as Ḩasanā-ye Ḩājjīābād-e Ḩājjī Ebrāhīm; also known as Ḩājjīābād-e Ḩājjī Ebrāhīm and Ḩasanā) is a village in Harirud Rural District of Buzhgan District in Torbat-e Jam County, Razavi Khorasan province, Iran.

== Demographics ==
=== Population ===
At the time of the 2006 National Census, the village's population was 214 in 48 households. The following census in 2011 counted 360 people in 89 households. The 2016 census measured the population of the village as 272 people in 76 households.
