= Dustabad, Torbat-e Jam =

Village in Razavi Khorasan province, Iran

Dustabad Persian: دوست اباد
- Village
- Location within Iran
- Coordinates: 35°03′57″N 60°57′13″E
- Country: Iran
- Province: Razavi Khorasan
- County: Torbat-e Jam
- District: Buzhgan
- Rural District: Harirud

Population (2016)
  - Total: 130
- Time zone: UTC+3:30 (IRST)

Dustabad (Persian: دوست اباد) (Note: Also romanized as Dūstābād) is a village in Harirud Rural District of Buzhgan District in Torbat-e Jam County, Razavi Khorasan province, Iran.

== Demographics ==
=== Population ===
At the time of the 2006 National Census, the village's population was 58 in 10 households. The following census in 2011 counted 131 people in 31 households. The 2016 census measured the population of the village as 130 people in 33 households.
