= Lashkarabad =

Village in Alborz province, Iran

Lashkarabad Persian: لشکراباد
- Village
- Location within Iran
- Coordinates: 35°51′21″N 50°45′05″E
- Country: Iran
- Province: Alborz
- County: Chaharbagh
- District: Ramjin
- Rural District: Ramjin

Population (2016)
  - Total: 7,198
- Time zone: UTC+3:30 (IRST)

Lashkarabad (Persian: لشکراباد) (Note: Also romanized as Lashkarābād; also known as Lashgarābād) is a village in Ramjin Rural District of Ramjin District in Chaharbagh County, Alborz province, Iran.

== Demographics ==
=== Population ===
At the time of the 2006 National Census, the village's population was 4,651 in 1,194 households, when it was in Chaharbagh District (Note: Renamed the Central District of Chaharbagh County) of Savojbolagh County, Tehran province. The 2016 census measured the population of the village as 7,198 in 2,281 households, by which time the county had been separated from the province in the establishment of Alborz province. Lashkarabad was the most populous village in its rural district.

In 2020, the district was separated from the county in establishing Chaharbagh County and renamed the Central District. The rural district was transferred to the new Ramjin District.
