= Rüstəmlı =

Rüstəmlı or Rəstəmli or Rustamly may refer to:

- Rüstəmlı, Sabirabad, Azerbaijan
- Rüstəmlı, Yevlakh, Azerbaijan
