= Aqdasiyeh =

Village in Alborz province, Iran

Aqdasiyeh Persian: اقدسيه
- Village
- Location within Iran
- Coordinates: 35°52′34″N 50°49′24″E
- Country: Iran
- Province: Alborz
- County: Chaharbagh
- District: Central
- Rural District: Chahardangeh

Population (2016)
  - Total: 191
- Time zone: UTC+3:30 (IRST)

Aqdasiyeh (Persian: اقدسيه) (Note: Also romanized as Āqdasīyeh) is a village in Chahardangeh Rural District of the Central District (Note: Formerly Chaharbagh District of Savojbolagh County) in Chaharbagh County, Alborz province, Iran.

== Demographics ==
=== Population ===
At the time of the 2006 National Census, the village's population was 17 in six households, when it was in Chaharbagh District (Note: Renamed the Central District of Chaharbagh County) of Savojbolagh County, Tehran province. The 2016 census measured the population of the village as 191 inhabitants in 58 households, by which time the county had been separated from the province in the establishment of Alborz province.

In 2020, the district was separated from the county in establishing Chaharbagh County and renamed the Central District.
