= Zakiabad =

Zakiabad or Zekiabad (Persian: زكي اباد) may refer to:

- Zakiabad, Alborz
- Zakiabad, Mazandaran
