= Samiabad =

Samiabad (Persian: سميع اباد) may refer to:

- Samiabad-e Arbab Din Mohammad
- Samiabad-e Hajji Aman
