= Shahrestanak, Torbat-e Jam =

Village in Razavi Khorasan province, Iran

Shahrestanak Persian: شهرستانك
- Village
- Location within Iran
- Coordinates: 35°09′33″N 60°54′43″E
- Country: Iran
- Province: Razavi Khorasan
- County: Torbat-e Jam
- District: Pain Jam
- Rural District: Zam

Population (2016)
  - Total: 1,078
- Time zone: UTC+3:30 (IRST)

Shahrestanak (Persian: شهرستانك) (Note: Also romanized as Shahrestānak; also known as Shahrābād) is a village in Zam Rural District (Note: Formerly Pain Jam Rural District) of Pain Jam District in Torbat-e Jam County, Razavi Khorasan province, Iran.

== Demographics ==
=== Population ===
At the time of the 2006 National Census, the village's population was 829 in 184 households. The following census in 2011 counted 1,008 people in 265 households. The 2016 census measured the population of the village as 1,078 people in 288 households.
