= Qaleh Khaki =

Village in Razavi Khorasan province, Iran

Qaleh Khaki Persian: قلعه خاكي
- Village
- Location within Iran
- Coordinates: 35°01′18″N 60°54′49″E
- Country: Iran
- Province: Razavi Khorasan
- County: Torbat-e Jam
- District: Buzhgan
- Rural District: Harirud

Population (2016)
  - Total: 189
- Time zone: UTC+3:30 (IRST)

Qaleh Khaki (Persian: قلعه خاكي) (Note: Also romanized as Qal‘eh Khākī; also known as Ghal’eh Khaki) is a village in Harirud Rural District of Buzhgan District in Torbat-e Jam County, Razavi Khorasan province, Iran.

== Demographics ==
=== Population ===
At the time of the 2006 National Census, the village's population was 114 in 21 households. The following census in 2011 counted 190 people in 50 households. The 2016 census measured the population of the village as 189 people in 53 households.
