= Vakilabad-e Pain Jam =

Village in Razavi Khorasan province, Iran

Vakilabad-e Pain Jam Persian: وكيل ابادپائين جام
- Village
- Location within Iran
- Coordinates: 35°11′01″N 60°55′33″E
- Country: Iran
- Province: Razavi Khorasan
- County: Torbat-e Jam
- District: Pain Jam
- Rural District: Zam

Population (2016)
  - Total: 520
- Time zone: UTC+3:30 (IRST)

Vakilabad-e Pain Jam (Persian: وكيل ابادپائين جام) (Note: Also romanized as Vakīlābād-e Pā’īn Jām; also known as Vakīlābād) is a village in Zam Rural District (Note: Formerly Pain Jam Rural District) of Pain Jam District in Torbat-e Jam County, Razavi Khorasan province, Iran.

== Demographics ==
=== Population ===
At the time of the 2006 National Census, the village's population was 409 in 104 households. The following census in 2011 counted 451 people in 117 households. The 2016 census measured the population of the village as 520 people in 150 households.
