= Melluy-ye Olya =

Village in Razavi Khorasan province, Iran

Melluy-ye Olya Persian: ملوي عليا
- Village
- Location within Iran
- Coordinates: 35°14′33″N 61°01′43″E
- Country: Iran
- Province: Razavi Khorasan
- County: Torbat-e Jam
- District: Pain Jam
- Rural District: Zam

Population (2016)
  - Total: 325
- Time zone: UTC+3:30 (IRST)

Melluy-ye Olya (Persian: ملوي عليا) (Note: Also romanized as Mellūy-ye ‘Olyā; also known as Mallow, Mallū, Mellū-e Bālā, Mellu-e Olya, and Mellū-e ‘Olyā) is a village in Zam Rural District (Note: Formerly Pain Jam Rural District) of Pain Jam District in Torbat-e Jam County, Razavi Khorasan province, Iran.

== Demographics ==
=== Population ===
At the time of the 2006 National Census, the village's population was 310 in 62 households. The following census in 2011 counted 313 people in 69 households. The 2016 census measured the population of the village as 325 people in 76 households.
