= Malekabad, Torbat-e Jam =

Village in Razavi Khorasan province, Iran

Malekabad Persian: ملك اباد
- Village
- Location within Iran
- Coordinates: 35°04′10″N 60°56′48″E
- Country: Iran
- Province: Razavi Khorasan
- County: Torbat-e Jam
- District: Buzhgan
- Rural District: Harirud

Population (2016)
  - Total: 318
- Time zone: UTC+3:30 (IRST)

Malekabad (Persian: ملك اباد) (Note: Also romanized as Malekābād) is a village in Harirud Rural District of Buzhgan District in Torbat-e Jam County, Razavi Khorasan province, Iran.

== Demographics ==
=== Population ===
At the time of the 2006 National Census, the village's population was 436 in 89 households. The following census in 2011 counted 299 people in 79 households. The 2016 census measured the population of the village as 318 people in 86 households.
