= Seydabad, Torbat-e Jam =

Village in Razavi Khorasan province, Iran

Seydabad Persian: صيداباد
- Village
- Location within Iran
- Coordinates: 35°08′04″N 60°57′16″E
- Country: Iran
- Province: Razavi Khorasan
- County: Torbat-e Jam
- District: Pain Jam
- Rural District: Zam

Population (2016)
  - Total: 186
- Time zone: UTC+3:30 (IRST)

Seydabad (Persian: صيداباد) (Note: Also romanized as Seydābād, Seyyedabad, and Seyyedābād) is a village in Zam Rural District (Note: Formerly Pain Jam Rural District) of Pain Jam District in Torbat-e Jam County, Razavi Khorasan province, Iran.

== Demographics ==
=== Population ===
At the time of the 2006 National Census, the village's population was 149 in 33 households. The following census in 2011 counted 165 people in 40 households. The 2016 census measured the population of the village as 186 people in 49 households.
