= Feyzabad-e Mish Mast =

Village in Razavi Khorasan province, Iran

Feyzabad-e Mish Mast Persian: فيض ابادميش مست
- Village
- Location within Iran
- Coordinates: 35°09′46″N 60°52′51″E
- Country: Iran
- Province: Razavi Khorasan
- County: Torbat-e Jam
- District: Pain Jam
- Rural District: Zam

Population (2016)
  - Total: 644
- Time zone: UTC+3:30 (IRST)

Feyzabad-e Mish Mast (Persian: فيض ابادميش مست) (Note: Also romanized as Feyẕābād-e Mīsh Mast; also known as Feyẕābād and Mīsh Mast (ميش مست)) is a village in Zam Rural District (Note: Formerly Pain Jam Rural District) of Pain Jam District in Torbat-e Jam County, Razavi Khorasan province, Iran.

== Demographics ==
=== Population ===
At the time of the 2006 National Census, the village's population was 589 in 133 households. The following census in 2011 counted 596 people in 133 households. The 2016 census measured the population of the village as 644 people in 164 households.
