= Sahebdad =

Village in Razavi Khorasan province, Iran

Sahebdad Persian: صاحبداد
- Village
- Location within Iran
- Coordinates: 35°07′54″N 60°55′21″E
- Country: Iran
- Province: Razavi Khorasan
- County: Torbat-e Jam
- District: Pain Jam
- Rural District: Zam

Population (2016)
  - Total: 687
- Time zone: UTC+3:30 (IRST)

Sahebdad (Persian: صاحبداد) (Note: Also romanized as Şāḩebdād) is a village in Zam Rural District (Note: Formerly Pain Jam Rural District) of Pain Jam District in Torbat-e Jam County, Razavi Khorasan province, Iran.

== Demographics ==
=== Population ===
At the time of the 2006 National Census, the village's population was 506 in 109 households. The following census in 2011 counted 620 people in 155 households. The 2016 census measured the population of the village as 687 people in 182 households.
