= Ismailabad =

Ismailabad may refer to:

- İsmayılabad, Azerbaijan
- Esmailabad (disambiguation), places in Iran
