= Arababad-e Khosravi =

Village in Alborz province, Iran

Arababad-e Khosravi Persian: عرب اباد خسروي
- Village
- Location within Iran
- Coordinates: 35°49′16″N 50°48′06″E
- Country: Iran
- Province: Alborz
- County: Chaharbagh
- District: Central
- Rural District: Arababad-e Afshar

Population (2016)
  - Total: 1,869
- Time zone: UTC+3:30 (IRST)

Arababad-e Khosravi (Persian: عرب اباد خسروي) (Note: Also romanized as ‘Arabābād-e Khosravī) is a village in, and the capital of, Arababad-e Afshar Rural District in the Central District (Note: Formerly Chaharbagh District of Savojbolagh County) of Chaharbagh County, Alborz province, Iran.

== Demographics ==
=== Population ===
At the time of the 2006 National Census, the village's population was 1,832, in 466 households, when it was in Chahardangeh Rural District of Chaharbagh District (Note: Renamed the Central District of Chaharbagh County) in Savojbolagh County, Tehran province. The 2016 census measured the population of the village as 1,869 in 647 households, by which time the county had been separated from the province in the establishment of Alborz province. Arababad-e Khosravi was the most populous village in its rural district.

In 2020, the district was separated from the county in establishing Chaharbagh County and renamed the Central District. Arababad-e Khosravi was transferred to Arababad-e Afshar Rural District created in the district.
