= Qaleh Kak =

Village in Razavi Khorasan province, Iran

Qaleh Kak Persian: قلعه كك
- Village
- Location within Iran
- Coordinates: 35°18′50″N 60°53′20″E
- Country: Iran
- Province: Razavi Khorasan
- County: Torbat-e Jam
- District: Pain Jam
- Rural District: Gol Banu

Population (2016)
  - Total: 2,597
- Time zone: UTC+3:30 (IRST)

Qaleh Kak (Persian: قلعه كك) (Note: Also romanized as Qal‘eh Kaḵ; also known as Ghal’eh Kek and Qal‘eh Gak) is a village in Gol Banu Rural District of Pain Jam District in Torbat-e Jam County, Razavi Khorasan province, Iran.

== Demographics ==
=== Population ===
At the time of the 2006 National Census, the village's population was 2,497 in 454 households. The following census in 2011 counted 2,962 people in 641 households. The 2016 census measured the population of the village as 2,597 people in 745 households, the most populous village in its rural district.
