= Qandak-e Khurdeh Malkin =

Village in Razavi Khorasan province, Iran

Qandak-e Khurdeh Malkin Persian: قندك خورده مالكين
- Village
- Location within Iran
- Coordinates: 35°10′04″N 60°55′19″E
- Country: Iran
- Province: Razavi Khorasan
- County: Torbat-e Jam
- District: Pain Jam
- Rural District: Zam

Population (2016)
  - Total: 376
- Time zone: UTC+3:30 (IRST)

Qandak-e Khurdeh Malkin (Persian: قندك خورده مالكين) (Note: Also romanized as Qandaḵ-e Khūrdeh Mālḵīn) is a village in Zam Rural District (Note: Formerly Pain Jam Rural District) of Pain Jam District in Torbat-e Jam County, Razavi Khorasan province, Iran.

== Demographics ==
=== Population ===
At the time of the 2006 National Census, the village's population was 281 in 60 households. The following census in 2011 counted 309 people in 69 households. The 2016 census measured the population of the village as 376 people in 102 households.
