= Khargushi, Razavi Khorasan =

Village in Razavi Khorasan province, Iran

Khargushi Persian: خرگوشي
- Village
- Location within Iran
- Coordinates: 35°02′59″N 60°55′25″E
- Country: Iran
- Province: Razavi Khorasan
- County: Torbat-e Jam
- District: Buzhgan
- Rural District: Harirud

Population (2016)
  - Total: 641
- Time zone: UTC+3:30 (IRST)

Khargushi (Persian: خرگوشي) (Note: Also romanized as Khargūshī; also known as Khargūshī Hezār) is a village in Harirud Rural District of Buzhgan District in Torbat-e Jam County, Razavi Khorasan province, Iran.

== Demographics ==
=== Population ===
At the time of the 2006 National Census, the village's population was 571 in 127 households. The following census in 2011 counted 571 people in 126 households. The 2016 census measured the population of the village as 641 people in 178 households.
