= Mikhak =

Mikhak (Persian: ميخك) may refer to:

- Mikhak, Pain Jam
- Mikhak, Salehabad
