= Səmədabad, Yevlakh =

Səmədabad
- Municipality
- Location within Azerbaijan
- Coordinates: 40°35′15″N 47°04′26″E
- Country: Azerbaijan
- Rayon: Yevlakh

Population
  - Total: 1,877
- Time zone: UTC+4 (AZT)
  - Summer (DST): UTC+5 (AZT)

Səmədabad (also, Samedabad) is a village and municipality in the Yevlakh Rayon of Azerbaijan. It has a population of 1,877. The municipality consists of the villages of Səmədabad, İsmayılabad, and Bünyadabad.
