= Hacıselli =

- Municipality
- Location within Azerbaijan
- Coordinates: 40°43′17″N 47°07′41″E
- Country: Azerbaijan
- City: Yevlakh

Population
  - Total: 1,363
- Time zone: UTC+4 (AZT)
  - Summer (DST): UTC+5 (AZT)

Hacıselli (also, Gadzhiselli and Gadzhyselli) is a village and municipality in the Yevlakh Rayon of Azerbaijan. It has a population of 1,363. The municipality consists of the villages of Hacıselli and Marzığı.
