= Esmailabad Shur Qaleh-ye Pain =

Village in Alborz province, Iran

Esmailabad Shur Qaleh-ye Pain Persian: اسمعيل ابادشورقلعه پايين
- Village
- Location within Iran
- Coordinates: 35°48′12″N 50°47′19″E
- Country: Iran
- Province: Alborz
- County: Chaharbagh
- District: Central
- Rural District: Arababad-e Afshar

Population (2016)
  - Total: 325
- Time zone: UTC+3:30 (IRST)

Esmailabad Shur Qaleh-ye Pain (Persian: اسمعيل ابادشورقلعه پايين) (Note: Also romanized as Esmā‘īlābād Shūr Qal‘eh-ye Pā’īn) is a village in Arababad-e Afshar Rural District of the Central District (Note: Formerly Chaharbagh District of Savojbolagh County) in Chaharbagh County, Alborz province, Iran.

== Demographics ==
=== Population ===
At the time of the 2006 National Census, the village's population was 263, in 66 households, when it was in Chahardangeh Rural District of Chaharbagh District (Note: Renamed the Central District of Chaharbagh County) in Savojbolagh County, Tehran province. The 2016 census measured the population of the village as 325 in 99 households, by which time the county had been separated from the province in the establishment of Alborz province.

In 2020, the district was separated from the county in establishing Chaharbagh County and renamed the Central District. Esmailabad Shur Qaleh-ye Pain was transferred to Arababad-e Afshar Rural District created in the district.
