= Qoyunbinəsi =

- Municipality
- Location within Azerbaijan
- Coordinates: 40°30′51″N 47°03′22″E
- Country: Azerbaijan
- Rayon: Yevlakh

Population
  - Total: 2,695
- Time zone: UTC+4 (AZT)
  - Summer (DST): UTC+5 (AZT)

Qoyunbinəsi (also, Koyunbinasi) is a village and municipality in the Yevlakh Rayon of Azerbaijan. It has a population of 2,695.
