= Hacımahmudlu =

Hajymahmudlu
- Azerbaijani: Hacımahmudlu
- Location within Azerbaijan
- Coordinates: 40°29′N 47°02′E
- Country: Azerbaijan
- District: Yevlakh
- Municipality: Garamanly
- Time zone: UTC+4 (AZT)
  - Summer (DST): UTC+5 (AZT)

Hacımahmudlu (also, Hajymahmudlu and Hajy-Mahmudlu) is a village in the Yevlakh District of Azerbaijan. The village forms part of the municipality of Garamanly.
