= Malbinəsi =

- Municipality
- Location within Azerbaijan
- Coordinates: 40°30′28″N 47°04′55″E
- Country: Azerbaijan
- Rayon: Yevlakh

Population
  - Total: 2,168
- Time zone: UTC+4 (AZT)
  - Summer (DST): UTC+5 (AZT)

Malbinəsi (also, Malbinesi) is a village and municipality in the Yevlakh Rayon of Azerbaijan. It has a population of 2,168.
