= Boşçalı =

Boshchaly
- Azerbaijani: Boşçalı
- Location within Azerbaijan
- Coordinates: 40°43′58″N 47°00′30″E
- Country: Azerbaijan
- District: Yevlakh
- Municipality: Huruushaghy

Population
  - Total: 102
- Time zone: UTC+4 (AZT)
  - Summer (DST): UTC+5 (AZT)

Boşçalı (also, Boshchaly) is a village in the Yevlakh District of Azerbaijan. The village forms part of the municipality of Huruushaghy.
