= Havarlı =

- Municipality
- Location within Azerbaijan
- Coordinates: 40°44′34″N 47°05′40″E
- Country: Azerbaijan
- Rayon: Yevlakh

Population
  - Total: 3,362
- Time zone: UTC+4 (AZT)
  - Summer (DST): UTC+5 (AZT)

Havarlı, also Gavarly (Azerbaijani: Havarlı) is a village and municipality in the Yevlakh Rayon of Azerbaijan. It has a population of 3,362. The municipality consists of the villages of Havarlı and Əxşam.

== Notable natives ==
- Malik Asadov — National Hero of Azerbaijan.
