= Hassan Orangi =

Iranian serial killer and rapist (1925–1951)

- Born: 1925; Esmailabad, Razavi Khorasan Province, Iran
- Died: December 2, 1951 (aged 26); Mashhad, Razavi Khorasan Province, Iran
- Cause of death: Executed by hanging
- Other name: "The Singing Killer"
- Conviction: Murder x62
- Penalty: Death

Details
- Victims: 62
- Span of crimes: 1945–1951
- Country: Iran
- State: Razavi Khorasan
- Date apprehended: April 7, 1951

Hassan Orangi (1925 – December 2, 1951; Persian: حسن اورنگی), known as The Singing Killer (Persian: قاتل آوازه‌خوان), was an Iranian serial killer and rapist who, together with accomplice Abbas Ali Zarifian, raped and murdered 62 women in Mashhad from 1945 to 1951. After his arrest, Orangi was tried, convicted, sentenced to death and later executed, while Zarifian was sentenced to 15 years for his role in the crimes.

== Early life ==
Little is known about Orangi's life prior to his crimes. Born in 1925 in the rural village of Esmailabad, he was one of several children born into a poor family. From a young age, he befriended another boy named Abbas Ali Zarifian, who was ten years his senior, with the pair always sticking together in whatever they wanted to do.

At some point during his adulthood, Orangi joined the Army, but eventually went AWOL and moved to Mashhad. There, with the help of Zarifian, he made a living out of beating and extorting destitute women and prostitutes, whom he eventually started killing out of an apparent desire for infamy.

== Murders ==
Orangi and Zarifian's modus operandi consisted of seeking out vulnerable women or prostitutes, and when they selected a victim, they would lure her to a secluded area where they would proceed to rape and then strangle her with a scarf or handkerchief. These killings were committed all around Mashhad, with bodies most often being found in Hossein Abad; the Balakhiyaban neighbourhood; in front of the Nakhrisi Factory; behind the oil company in Moghadam Tabarsi Square; the Mohammad Abad Fields; the Artillery Square; behind Koh Sangi; the Old Tehran Road; the Mosli neighbourhood and near the Abkoh Sugar Factory.

The first recorded murder occurred in the winter of 1945, followed by 61 similar killings that occurred until 1951. The events were heavily covered by local media, and the presence what appeared to be a killer targeting women led some superstitious people to suggest that Asghar the Murderer had been resurrected and possessed somebody who had resumed his killing spree.

=== Wrongful arrest ===
In early 1951, officers at the Chahar Police Station started to suspect a man named Qurban Sidi of being responsible. After detaining and torturing him, the man confessed to killing the first victim back in 1945, and later confessed to also killing the latest victim, who had been found strangled with a handkerchief.

However, some of Qurban's statements during interrogations proved to be inconsistent with autopsy reports provided by medical examiners in Tehran, leading some to doubt the credibility of his confessions. Eventually, investigators determined that he suffered from delusions and was mentally unwell - due to this, he was dismissed as a suspect and released.

== Last murder, investigation and arrest ==
On March 27, 1951, a letter penned by a local butcher named Ali Akbar Khan Khosravi was sent to Col. Mohammad Khatami, the Police Chief of the Khorasan Municipality Directorate. In it, Khosravi stated that while he was passing by the Abkoh Sugar Factory he came across what appeared to be the body of a dead woman, and asked for the police to investigate it.

Shortly after receiving this letter, police officers were dispatched to investigate the area, upon which they found the body of a young woman who had apparently been strangled with a handkerchief. After taking photographs of the deceased and distributing them among the police department, one constable identified the woman as 26-year-old Bibi Noghani. Investigators when to interview her family members, from whom they learned that Noghani had divorced twice and was known for taking on many suitors, leading them to believe that she was killed by one.

While they were investigating all suspicious men living in Mashhad, officers came across the 26-year-old Orangi, noting that he was a fugitive from the Army known for extorting women. They soon located a woman named Goltaban who claimed that Orangi had attempted to rape and strangle her, but that she screamed for help and was saved by two passers-by. On April 7, two detectives and one constable dressed in casual clothing and went to an opium den in the Zabliha neighbourhood, where Orangi was known to reside. When they reached the place, the detectives immediately spotted Orangi, who turned off his oil lamp and attempted to hide, but the detectives - who were carrying flashlights - lit up the room and immediately arrested him. At the time, it was discovered that he had recently become addicted to opium and regularly used the services of prostitutes.

=== Confessions ===
During initial interrogations, Orangi denied knowing Noghani, but eventually admitted that he did know her after other women indicated that he was acquainted with the woman (whom he knew as "Narges") and that they had seen him with her on the night of the murder. He then explained that it was actually his friend Abbas who had killed her, for which he was arrested on the following day. When confronted about this, Abbas broke down in tears and confessed to helping kill not only Noghani but multiple other women dating back to 1945. In his version of events, the main killer was his friend Orangi, while he was simply the accomplice.

Now faced with contradicting accounts, interrogators asked Orangi repeatedly to tell the truth, with him eventually saying that he was willing to confess what had truly happened if they allowed him to write down his crimes, recite poems and smoke opium. Deciding to listen to his demands, the interrogators obliged, after which Orangi wrote down a detailed confession of how he had killed Noghani. This was later compared with Zarifian's confessions, and upon further review, investigators came to the conclusion that Orangi was the main killer while Zarifian acted as an accomplice. In his written confessions, Orangi stated that he wanted to rid the world of corruption, in addition to seeking infamy out of the terrible crimes he committed. Due to the fact that he sometimes sang songs to the victims before killing them, he was nicknamed "The Singing Killer" (Persian: قاتل آوازه‌خوان).

== Death sentence and execution ==
When put on trial, Orangi believed that he would not be sentenced to death, as he believed that the people would not care about the deaths of "morally weak" women. Instead, he was found guilty on all counts and sentenced to hang, while Zarifian was sentenced to 15 years for complicity to murder. While incarcerated, he was detained in solitary confinement.

His execution date was set for December 2, 1951, and when approached by the prison guards, Orangi started crying. In the last minutes before his hanging, Orangi requested that he be able to see his aunt and little brother, but as the prison staff were unable to locate the brother, they only brought the aunt. Orangi then handed her his will, in which he begged his younger brother to study hard and not turn out like him; to have his body buried at the highest point in Mashhad, and to not be forgotten. Shortly afterwards, he was brought to the scaffold in the town square and hanged in front of a large crowd.

After his release from prison, Abbas Ali Zarifian left Mashhad and never returned, leaving his ultimate fate unclear.

== See also ==
- List of serial killers by country
