= Marzığı =

- Location within Azerbaijan
- Coordinates: 40°42′34″N 47°08′01″E
- Country: Azerbaijan
- City: Yevlakh
- Municipality: Hacıselli
- Time zone: UTC+4 (AZT)
  - Summer (DST): UTC+5 (AZT)

Marzığı (also, Marzygi and Marzygy) is a village in the Yevlakh Rayon (Yevlakh District) of Azerbaijan. The village forms part of the municipality of Hacıselli.
