= Bünyadabad =

- Village
- Location within Azerbaijan
- Coordinates: 40°35′N 47°02′E
- Country: Azerbaijan
- City: Yevlakh
- Time zone: UTC+4 (AZT)
  - Summer (DST): UTC+5 (AZT)

Bünyadabad is a village in the municipality of Səmədabad in the Yevlakh Rayon of Azerbaijan.
