= Qaramanlı =

Garamanly
- Municipality
- Azerbaijani: Qaramanlı
- Location within Azerbaijan
- Coordinates: 40°28′59″N 46°59′43″E
- Country: Azerbaijan
- District: Yevlakh

Population
  - Total: 2,230
- Time zone: UTC+4 (AZT)
  - Summer (DST): UTC+5 (AZT)

Qaramanlı (also, Garamanly and Garamanli) is a village and municipality in the Yevlakh District of Azerbaijan. It has a population of 2,230. The municipality consists of the villages of Garamanly, Hajymahmudlu, Dəlləklər, Köyük, Nəmirli, and Nurulular.
