= Shamama Aliyeva =

Azerbaijani and Soviet cotton grower (1938–2020)

- Şamama Əliyeva
- Born: May 1, 1938; Yevlakh District, Azerbaijan SSR, USSR
- Died: January 9, 2020 (aged 81); Yevlakh District, Azerbaijan
- Occupation: cotton grower
- Awards: Order of Lenin

Shamama Tanriverdi gizi Aliyeva (Azerbaijani: Şamama Tanrıverdi qızı Əliyeva, May 1, 1938 — January 9, 2020) was an Azerbaijani and Soviet cotton grower, collective farmer of the cotton-growing collective farm "Communist" of the Yevlakh District of the Azerbaijan SSR, deputy of the Supreme Soviet of the Azerbaijan SSR, laureate of the Order of Lenin, Hero of Socialist Labor, Mother Heroine.

== Biography ==
Shamama Aliyeva was born on May 1, 1938, in Yevlakh District. She was interested in cotton growing since childhood. She began her career as an ordinary cotton grower. Worked in the cotton-growing collective farm "Communist" of the Yevlakh District of the Azerbaijan SSR. Aliyeva's best result was 280–320 kg of cotton per day.

By 1970, S. Aliyeva had harvested 43 tons of cotton in five years. In 1970, she achieved to harvest 14 tons 400 kg of cotton. In the same year, Aliyeva was awarded the Order of Lenin. Since then, Shamama Aliyeva had been a deputy of the Supreme Council of Azerbaijan for four years.

When the 1976 harvest began, Shamama Aliyeva called on cotton growers to fight for 15 tons of cotton. Many cotton growers joined Aliyeva's call. Dozens of cotton growers in the Communist collective farm alone supported Aliyeva's call. As a result, many brigades harvested cotton much more than the established norm. Shamama Aliyeva herself harvested more than 15 tons of cotton in the first year of the tenth five-year plan.

By the Decree of the Presidium of the Supreme Soviet of the USSR dated March 10, 1982, Shamama Tanriverdi gizi Aliyeva was awarded the Order of Lenin and the Gold Medal "Sickle and Hammer" and the title of Hero of Socialist Labor.

Despite the fact that the city party committee offered Shamama Aliyeva to study in absentia at the Kirovobad Agrarian Institute, Aliyeva refused, saying that she was a cotton grower.

Aliyeva was the founder and head of the "Chinar" farm. She engaged in picking cotton, grain and cattle breeding.

Shamama Aliyeva continued to pick cotton even at the age of 80. Shamama Aliyeva died on January 9, 2020.

== Personal life ==
Shamama Aliyeva married her fellow villager, who worked as a driver in the collective farm where Aliyeva worked. The couple had 10 children. Shamama Aliyeva had 28 grandchildren.
