= Esmailabad Shur Qaleh-ye Bala =

Village in Alborz province, Iran

Esmailabad Shur Qaleh-ye Bala Persian: اسمعيل ابادشورقلعه بالا
- Village
- Location within Iran
- Coordinates: 35°48′12″N 50°47′19″E
- Country: Iran
- Province: Alborz
- County: Chaharbagh
- District: Central
- Rural District: Arababad-e Afshar

Population (2016)
  - Total: 131
- Time zone: UTC+3:30 (IRST)

Esmailabad Shur Qaleh-ye Bala (Persian: اسمعيل ابادشورقلعه بالا) (Note: Also romanized as Esmā‘īlābād Shūr Qal‘eh-ye Bālā) is a village in Arababad-e Afshar Rural District of the Central District (Note: Formerly Chaharbagh District of Savojbolagh County) in Chaharbagh County, Alborz province, Iran.

== Demographics ==
=== Population ===
At the time of the 2006 National Census, the village's population was 63, in 17 households, when it was in Chahardangeh Rural District of Chaharbagh District (Note: Renamed the Central District of Chaharbagh County) in Savojbolagh County, Tehran province. The 2016 census measured the population of the village as 131 in 48 households, by which time the county had been separated from the province in the establishment of Alborz province.

In 2020, the district was separated from the county in establishing Chaharbagh County and renamed the Central District. Esmailabad Shur Qaleh-ye Bala was transferred to Arababad-e Afshar Rural District created in the district.
