= Hürüuşağı =

Huruushaghy
- Municipality
- Azerbaijani: Hürüuşağı
- Location within Azerbaijan
- Coordinates: 40°43′21″N 47°01′05″E
- Country: Azerbaijan
- District: Yevlakh

Population
  - Total: 899
- Time zone: UTC+4 (AZT)
  - Summer (DST): UTC+5 (AZT)

Hürüuşağı (also, Huruushaghy and Guruushagy) is a village and municipality in the Yevlakh District of Azerbaijan. It has a population of 899. The municipality consists of the villages of Huruushaghy and Boshchaly.
