= Nurulular =

Village in Yevlakh District, Azerbaijan

- Village
- Location in Azerbaijan
- Coordinates: 40°28′32″N 47°01′51″E

Nurulular is a village in the municipality of Qaramanlı in the Yevlakh Rayon of Azerbaijan.
