= Ərəbbəsra =

- Municipality
- Location within Azerbaijan
- Coordinates: 40°46′53″N 47°12′29″E
- Country: Azerbaijan
- Rayon: Yevlakh

Population
  - Total: 806
- Time zone: UTC+4 (AZT)
  - Summer (DST): UTC+5 (AZT)

Ərəbbəsra is a village and municipality in the Yevlakh Rayon of Azerbaijan. It has a population of 806.
