= Dəlləklər =

- Location within Azerbaijan
- Coordinates: 40°26′42″N 46°59′31″E
- Country: Azerbaijan
- Rayon: Yevlakh
- Municipality: Qaramanlı
- Time zone: UTC+4 (AZT)
  - Summer (DST): UTC+5 (AZT)

Dəlləklər (also, Dellyaklyar and Delleklyar) is a village in the Yevlakh Rayon of Azerbaijan. The village forms part of the municipality of Qaramanlı.
