= Mikhak, Pain Jam =

Village in Razavi Khorasan province, Iran

Mikhak Persian: ميخك
- Village
- Location within Iran
- Coordinates: 35°11′21″N 60°50′41″E
- Country: Iran
- Province: Razavi Khorasan
- County: Torbat-e Jam
- District: Pain Jam
- Rural District: Gol Banu

Population (2016)
  - Total: 405
- Time zone: UTC+3:30 (IRST)

Mikhak (Persian: ميخك) (Note: Also romanized as Mīkhak; also known as Mīkhak-e Seyyedābād) is a village in Gol Banu Rural District of Pain Jam District in Torbat-e Jam County, Razavi Khorasan province, Iran.

== Demographics ==
=== Population ===
At the time of the 2006 National Census, the village's population was 412 in 92 households. The following census in 2011 counted 391 people in 98 households. The 2016 census measured the population of the village as 405 people in 99 households.
