= Yaldili =

- Municipality
- Location within Azerbaijan
- Coordinates: 40°37′N 46°59′E
- Country: Azerbaijan
- Rayon: Yevlakh

Population
  - Total: 1,315
- Time zone: UTC+4 (AZT)
  - Summer (DST): UTC+5 (AZT)

Yaldili is a village and municipality in the Yevlakh Rayon of Azerbaijan. It has a population of 1,315.
