= Esmail Khan =

Village in Razavi Khorasan province, Iran

Esmail Khan Persian: اسماعيل خان
- Village
- Location within Iran
- Coordinates: 35°11′04″N 60°52′27″E
- Country: Iran
- Province: Razavi Khorasan
- County: Torbat-e Jam
- District: Pain Jam
- Rural District: Gol Banu

Population (2016)
  - Total: 716
- Time zone: UTC+3:30 (IRST)

Esmail Khan (Persian: اسماعيل خان) (Note: Also romanized as Esmā‘īl Khān; also known as Esmāʿīlābād (اسماعيل اباد)) is a village in Gol Banu Rural District of Pain Jam District in Torbat-e Jam County, Razavi Khorasan province, Iran.

== Demographics ==
=== Population ===
At the time of the 2006 National Census, the village's population was 539 in 113 households. The following census in 2011 counted 653 people in 163 households. The 2016 census measured the population of the village as 716 people in 177 households.
