= Köyük, Yevlakh =

Köyük
- Location within Azerbaijan
- Coordinates: 40°27′38″N 46°58′40″E
- Country: Azerbaijan
- City: Yevlakh
- Municipality: Qaramanlı
- Time zone: UTC+4 (AZT)
  - Summer (DST): UTC+5 (AZT)

Köyük (also, Göyük, Gëyuk, and Keyuk) is a village in the Yevlakh Rayon of Azerbaijan. The village forms part of the municipality of Qaramanlı.
