= Əxşam =

- Location within Azerbaijan
- Coordinates: 40°44′19″N 47°09′46″E
- Country: Azerbaijan
- Rayon: Yevlakh
- Municipality: Havarlı
- Time zone: UTC+4 (AZT)
  - Summer (DST): UTC+5 (AZT)

Əxşam (also, Akhsham and Ekhshem) is a village in the Yevlakh Rayon of Azerbaijan. The village forms part of the municipality of Havarlı.
