= Sadafli =

- Location within Azerbaijan
- Coordinates: 40°31′N 47°02′E
- Country: Azerbaijan
- Rayon: Yevlakh
- Time zone: UTC+4 (AZT)
  - Summer (DST): UTC+5 (AZT)

Sadafli is a village in the Yevlakh Rayon of Azerbaijan.
