= Tanrıqulular =

- Municipality
- Location within Azerbaijan
- Coordinates: 40°42′41″N 46°58′04″E
- Country: Azerbaijan
- Rayon: Yevlakh

Population
  - Total: 2,426
- Time zone: UTC+4 (AZT)
  - Summer (DST): UTC+5 (AZT)

Tanrıqulular (also, Tangulular, Tanrygullar, Tanrygulular, and Tanrykulular) is a village and municipality in the Yevlakh Rayon of Azerbaijan. It has a population of 2,426.
