= Aghlan Tappeh Rural District =

Rural district in Alborz province, Iran

Aghlan Tappeh Rural District Persian: دهستان اغلان‌تپه
- Rural District
- Location within Iran
- Coordinates: 35°50′N 50°41′E
- Country: Iran
- Province: Alborz
- County: Chaharbagh
- District: Ramjin
- Established: 2020
- Capital: Aghlan Tappeh
- Time zone: UTC+3:30 (IRST)

Aghlan Tappeh Rural District (Persian: دهستان اغلان‌تپه) is in Ramjin District of Chaharbagh County, Alborz province, Iran. Its capital is the village of Aghlan Tappeh, whose population at the time of the 2016 National Census was 2,085 in 635 households.

== History ==
In 2010, Savojbolagh County was separated from Tehran province in the establishment of Alborz province.

In 2020, Chaharbagh District (Note: Renamed the Central District of Chaharbagh County) was separated from the county in establishing Chaharbagh County and renamed the Central District. Aghlan Tappeh Rural District was created in the new Ramjin District.

=== Other villages in the rural district ===
- Aghcheh Hesar
- Ebrahimabad
- Kahrizak
- Kheyrabad
- Yaqubabad
- Zafaraniyeh
- Zakiabad
