= Əcəmi =

- Municipality
- Location within Azerbaijan
- Coordinates: 40°41′58″N 47°11′30″E
- Country: Azerbaijan
- City: Yevlakh

Population
  - Total: 378
- Time zone: UTC+4 (AZT)
  - Summer (DST): UTC+5 (AZT)

Əcəmi (also, Adzhami) is a village and municipality in the Yevlakh Rayon of Azerbaijan. It has a population of 378.
