= Samiabad-e Hajji Aman =

Village in Razavi Khorasan province, Iran

Samiabad-e Hajji Aman Persian: سميع ابادحاجي امان
- Village
- Location within Iran
- Coordinates: 35°08′11″N 60°55′07″E
- Country: Iran
- Province: Razavi Khorasan
- County: Torbat-e Jam
- District: Pain Jam
- Rural District: Zam

Population (2016)
  - Total: 309
- Time zone: UTC+3:30 (IRST)

Samiabad-e Hajji Aman (Persian: سميع ابادحاجي امان) (Note: Also romanized as Samī‘ābād-e Ḩājjī Amān; also known as Ḩājjī Amān) is a village in Zam Rural District (Note: Formerly Pain Jam Rural District) of Pain Jam District in Torbat-e Jam County, Razavi Khorasan province, Iran.

== Demographics ==
=== Population ===
At the time of the 2006 National Census, the village's population was 266 in 60 households. The following census in 2011 counted 275 people in 65 households. The 2016 census measured the population of the village as 309 people in 82 households.
