= Nilshahr =

City in Razavi Khorasan province, Iran

Nilshahr Persian: نيل شهر
- City
- Location within Iran
- Coordinates: 35°07′24″N 60°46′27″E
- Country: Iran
- Province: Razavi Khorasan
- County: Torbat-e Jam
- District: Buzhgan
- Established as a city: 2005

Population (2016)
  - Total: 7,371
- Time zone: UTC+3:30 (IRST)

Nilshahr (Persian: نيل شهر) (Note: Also romanized as Nīlshahr; formerly the village of Nilabad (نیل آباد), also romanized as Nīlābād) is a city in, and the capital of, Buzhgan District in Torbat-e Jam County, Razavi Khorasan province, Iran. The village of Nilabad was converted to a city and renamed Nilshahr in 2005.

== Demographics ==
=== Population ===
At the time of the 2006 National Census, the city's population was 6,674 in 1,467 households. The following census in 2011 counted 6,797 people in 1,690 households. The 2016 census measured the population of the city as 7,371 people in 1,916 households.
