= Yadegar-e Olya =

Village in Razavi Khorasan province, Iran

Yadegar-e Olya Persian: يادگارعليا
- Village
- Location within Iran
- Coordinates: 35°08′45″N 60°56′03″E
- Country: Iran
- Province: Razavi Khorasan
- County: Torbat-e Jam
- District: Pain Jam
- Rural District: Zam

Population (2016)
  - Total: 672
- Time zone: UTC+3:30 (IRST)

Yadegar-e Olya (Persian: يادگارعليا) (Note: Also romanized as Yādegār-e ‘Olyā; also known as ‘Alī Khvājeh, Yādegār-e ‘Alī Khvājeh, Yādegār-e ‘Alī Khvājeh-ye ‘Olyā, and Yādegār-e Bālā) is a village in Zam Rural District (Note: Formerly Pain Jam Rural District) of Pain Jam District in Torbat-e Jam County, Razavi Khorasan province, Iran.

== Demographics ==
=== Population ===
At the time of the 2006 National Census, the village's population was 398 in 88 households. The following census in 2011 counted 753 people in 169 households. The 2016 census measured the population of the village as 672 people in 178 households.
