= Ahmadabad-e Sowlat =

City in Razavi Khorasan province, Iran

Ahmadabad-e Sowlat Persian: احمداباد صولت
- City
- Location within Iran
- Coordinates: 35°06′59″N 60°41′18″E
- Country: Iran
- Province: Razavi Khorasan
- County: Torbat-e Jam
- District: Buzhgan
- Established as a city: 2007

Population (2016)
  - Total: 8,326
- Time zone: UTC+3:30 (IRST)

Ahmadabad-e Sowlat (Persian: احمدابادصولت) (Note: Also romanized as Aḩmadābād-e Şowlat; also known as Ahmad Abad Pa’in, Aḩmadābād, and Aḩmadābād-e Pā’īn) is a city in Buzhgan District of Torbat-e Jam County, Razavi Khorasan province, Iran, serving as the administrative center for Dasht-e Jam Rural District.

== Demographics ==
=== Population ===
At the time of the 2006 National Census, Ahmadabad-e Sowlat's population was 6,825 in 1,390 households, when it was a village in Dasht-e Jam Rural District. The following census in 2011 counted 6,758 people in 1,563 households, by which time the village had been converted to a city. The 2016 census measured the population of the city as 8,326 people in 2,115 households.
