= Nəmirli, Yevlakh =

Nəmirli
- Location within Azerbaijan
- Coordinates: 40°28′N 46°59′E
- Country: Azerbaijan
- City: Yevlakh
- Municipality: Qaramanlı
- Time zone: UTC+4 (AZT)
  - Summer (DST): UTC+5 (AZT)

Nəmirli (also, Namirli and Namarly) is a village in the Yevlakh Rayon of Azerbaijan. The village forms part of the municipality of Qaramanlı.
