= Yadegar-e Sofla =

Village in Razavi Khorasan province, Iran

Yadegar-e Sofla Persian: يادگارسفلي
- Village
- Location within Iran
- Coordinates: 35°08′38″N 60°55′57″E
- Country: Iran
- Province: Razavi Khorasan
- County: Torbat-e Jam
- District: Pain Jam
- Rural District: Zam

Population (2016)
  - Total: 574
- Time zone: UTC+3:30 (IRST)

Yadegar-e Sofla (Persian: يادگارسفلي) (Note: Also romanized as Yādegār-e Soflá; also known as Yādegār-e ‘Alī Khvājeh-ye Soflá and Yādegār-e Pā’īn) is a village in Zam Rural District (Note: Formerly Pain Jam Rural District) of Pain Jam District in Torbat-e Jam County, Razavi Khorasan province, Iran.

== Demographics ==
=== Population ===
At the time of the 2006 National Census, the village's population was 806 in 172 households. The following census in 2011 counted 462 people in 93 households. The 2016 census measured the population of the village as 574 people in 152 households.
