= Rüstəmlı, Yevlakh =

Rüstəmlı
- Municipality
- Location within Azerbaijan
- Coordinates: 40°31′26″N 47°00′02″E
- Country: Azerbaijan
- Rayon: Yevlakh

Population
  - Total: 862
- Time zone: UTC+4 (AZT)
  - Summer (DST): UTC+5 (AZT)

Rüstəmlı (also, Rəstəmli) is a village and municipality in the Yevlakh Rayon of Azerbaijan. It has a population of 862.
