= Harirud Rural District =

Rural district in Razavi Khorasan province, Iran

Harirud Rural District Persian: دهستان هريرود
- Rural District
- Location within Iran
- Coordinates: 35°02′N 60°55′E
- Country: Iran
- Province: Razavi Khorasan
- County: Torbat-e Jam
- District: Buzhgan
- Established: 2003
- Capital: Dowlatabad

Population (2016)
  - Total: 5,275
- Time zone: UTC+3:30 (IRST)

Harirud Rural District (Persian: دهستان هريرود) is in Buzhgan District of Torbat-e Jam County, Razavi Khorasan province, Iran. Its capital is the village of Dowlatabad.

== Demographics ==
=== Population ===
At the time of the 2006 National Census, the rural district's population was 4,430 in 951 households. There were 5,232 inhabitants in 1,258 households at the following census of 2011. The 2016 census measured the population of the rural district as 5,275 in 1,490 households. The most populous of its 32 villages was Khalili, with 1,021 people.

=== Other villages in the rural district ===
- Dustabad
- Gav Cheshmeh
- Hasana-ye Hajjiabad-e Hajji Ebrahim
- Jahanabad
- Kalateh-ye Abd ol Samad
- Khargushi
- Malekabad
- Mansuriyeh
- Qaleh Khaki
- Robat
