= Zam Rural District =

Rural district in Razavi Khorasan province, Iran

Zam Rural District Persian: دهستان زام
- Rural District
- Location within Iran
- Coordinates: 35°14′N 61°01′E
- Country: Iran
- Province: Razavi Khorasan
- County: Torbat-e Jam
- District: Pain Jam
- Established: 1987
- Capital: Samiabad-e Arbab Din Mohammad

Population (2016)
  - Total: 10,239
- Time zone: UTC+3:30 (IRST)

Zam Rural District (Persian: دهستان زام) (Note: Formerly Pain Jam Rural District (دهستان پائین جام)) is in Pain Jam District of Torbat-e Jam County, Razavi Khorasan province, Iran. It is administered from the city of Samiabad-e Arbab Din Mohammad.

== Demographics ==
=== Population ===
At the time of the 2006 National Census, the rural district's population was 8,557 in 1,869 households. There were 9,837 inhabitants in 2,333 households at the following census of 2011. The 2016 census measured the population of the rural district as 10,239 in 2,687 households. The most populous of its 37 villages was Mohammadabad, with 2,091 people.

=== Other villages in the rural district ===
- Feyzabad-e Mish Mast
- Melluy-ye Olya
- Qandak-e Khurdeh Malkin
- Sahebdad
- Samiabad-e Hajji Aman
- Seydabad
- Shahdabad
- Shahrestanak
- Vakilabad-e Pain Jam
- Yadegar-e Olya
- Yadegar-e Sofla
