= Gol Banu Rural District =

Rural district in Razavi Khorasan province, Iran

Gol Banu Rural District Persian: دهستان گل بانو
- Rural District
- Location within Iran
- Coordinates: 35°15′08″N 60°51′54″E
- Country: Iran
- Province: Razavi Khorasan
- County: Torbat-e Jam
- District: Pain Jam
- Established: 2003
- Capital: Aliabad

Population (2016)
  - Total: 9,338
- Time zone: UTC+3:30 (IRST)

Gol Banu Rural District (Persian: دهستان گل بانو) is in Pain Jam District of Torbat-e Jam County, Razavi Khorasan province, Iran. Its capital is the village of Aliabad.

== Demographics ==
=== Population ===
At the time of the 2006 National Census, the rural district's population was 7,998 in 1,614 households. There were 9,088 inhabitants in 2,120 households at the following census of 2011. The 2016 census measured the population of the rural district as 9,338 in 2,540 households. The most populous of its 16 villages was Qaleh Kak, with 2,597 people.

=== Other villages in the rural district ===
- Ahianu
- Ahmadabad-e Banakdar
- Allahabad
- Eslamabad
- Esmail Khan
- Hoseynabad-e Kalali
- Hoseyn-e Aqa Beyk
- Kalateh-ye Sanam
- Mikhak
- Qasemabad
- Rahmatabad
