= İsmayılabad =

- Location within Azerbaijan
- Coordinates: 40°34′56″N 47°05′31″E
- Country: Azerbaijan
- Rayon: Yevlakh
- Municipality: Səmədabad
- Time zone: UTC+4 (AZT)
  - Summer (DST): UTC+5 (AZT)

İsmayılabad (also, Ismailabad) is a village in the Yevlakh Rayon of Azerbaijan. The village forms part of the municipality of Səmədabad.
