= Dasht-e Jam Rural District =

Rural district in Razavi Khorasan province, Iran

Dasht-e Jam Rural District Persian: دهستان دشت جام
- Rural District
- Location within Iran
- Coordinates: 35°06′N 60°40′E
- Country: Iran
- Province: Razavi Khorasan
- County: Torbat-e Jam
- District: Buzhgan
- Established: 2003
- Capital: Ahmadabad-e Sowlat

Population (2016)
  - Total: 4
- Time zone: UTC+3:30 (IRST)

Dasht-e Jam Rural District (Persian: دهستان دشت جام) is in Buzhgan District of Torbat-e Jam County, Razavi Khorasan province, Iran. It is administered from the city of Ahmadabad-e Sowlat.

== Demographics ==
=== Population ===
At the time of the 2006 National Census, the rural district's population was 7,296 in 1,498 households. There were 422 inhabitants in 101 households at the following census of 2011. The 2016 census measured the population of the rural district as four people in one household. Of its 14 villages, 13 reported a population of zero; the remaining village, Chah-e Shomareh Seh-e Ardakaniyan (چاه شماره 3اردكانيان), had a population below the reporting threshold.
