= Esmailabad, Zarand =

Esmailabad اسماعيل اباد
- Village
- Location within Iran
- Coordinates: 30°48′11″N 56°28′16″E
- Country: Iran
- Province: Kerman
- County: Zarand
- Bakhsh: Central
- Rural District: Mohammadabad

Population (2006)
  - Total: 930
- Time zone: UTC+3:30 (IRST)
  - Summer (DST): UTC+4:30 (IRDT)

Esmailabad (Persian: اسماعيل اباد, also Romanized as Esmā‘īlābādand Isma‘ilābād; also known as Esma-il Abad Hoomeh Zarand) is a village in Mohammadabad Rural District, in the Central District of Zarand County, Kerman Province, Iran. At the 2006 census, its population was 930, in 231 families.
