= Esmailabad, Lorestan =

Esmailabad اسماعيل آباد
- Village
- Location within Iran
- Coordinates: 34°04′22″N 48°00′54″E
- Country: Iran
- Province: Lorestan
- County: Delfan
- Bakhsh: Central
- Rural District: Nurabad

Population (2006)
  - Total: 326
- Time zone: UTC+3:30 (IRST)
  - Summer (DST): UTC+4:30 (IRDT)

Esmailabad (Persian: اسماعيل آباد, also Romanized as Esmā‘īlābād) is a village in Nurabad Rural District, in the Central District of Delfan County, Lorestan Province, Iran. At the 2006 census, its population was 326, in 68 families.
