= Esmailabad, Rafsanjan =

Esmailabad اسماعيل آباد
- Village
- Location within Iran
- Coordinates: 30°26′22″N 55°57′30″E
- Country: Iran
- Province: Kerman
- County: Rafsanjan
- Bakhsh: Central
- Rural District: Eslamiyeh

Population (2006)
  - Total: 745
- Time zone: UTC+3:30 (IRST)
  - Summer (DST): UTC+4:30 (IRDT)

Esmailabad (Persian: اسماعيل آباد, also Romanized as Esmā‘īlābād; also known as Esma’il Abad Hoomeh) is a village in Eslamiyeh Rural District, in the Central District of Rafsanjan County, Kerman Province, Iran. At the 2006 census, its population was 745, in 187 families.
