= Nəmirli, Agsu =

Nəmirli
- Municipality
- Location within Azerbaijan
- Coordinates: 40°35′19″N 48°17′58″E
- Country: Azerbaijan
- Rayon: Agsu

Population
  - Total: 445
- Time zone: UTC+4 (AZT)
  - Summer (DST): UTC+5 (AZT)

Nəmirli (also, Mamirly, Namerli, Namirly, and Nemirli) is a village and municipality in the Agsu Rayon of Azerbaijan. It has a population of 445.
