= Shekarabad, Delfan =

Shekarabad شکرآباد
- Village
- Location within Iran
- Coordinates: 33°52′02″N 48°01′05″E
- Country: Iran
- Province: Lorestan
- County: Delfan
- Bakhsh: Central
- Rural District: Nurabad

Population (2006)
  - Total: 247
- Time zone: UTC+3:30 (IRST)
  - Summer (DST): UTC+4:30 (IRDT)

Shekarabad (Persian: شکرآباد, also Romanized as Shekarābād; also known as Shokrābād and Lashkarābād) is a village in Nurabad Rural District, in the Central District of Delfan County, Lorestan Province, Iran.

== Population ==
At the 2006 census, its population was 247, in 57 families.
