= Esmailabad, Darab =

Esmailabad اسماعيل اباد
- Village
- Location within Iran
- Coordinates: 28°46′49″N 54°19′52″E
- Country: Iran
- Province: Fars
- County: Darab
- Bakhsh: Central
- Rural District: Paskhan

Population (2006)
  - Total: 698
- Time zone: UTC+3:30 (IRST)
  - Summer (DST): UTC+4:30 (IRDT)

Esmailabad (Persian: اسماعيل اباد, also Romanized as Esmā‘īlābād; also known as Esmā‘īlābād-e Fasārūd) is a village in Paskhan Rural District, in the Central District of Darab County, Fars province, Iran. At the 2006 census, its population was 698, in 164 families.
