= Esmiabad =

Esmiabad اسمي اباد
- Village
- Location within Iran
- Coordinates: 32°24′54″N 50°20′29″E
- Country: Iran
- Province: Chaharmahal and Bakhtiari
- County: Kuhrang
- Bakhsh: Central
- Rural District: Dasht-e Zarrin

Population (2006)
  - Total: 78
- Time zone: UTC+3:30 (IRST)
  - Summer (DST): UTC+4:30 (IRDT)

Esmiabad (Persian: اسمي اباد, also Romanized as Esmīābād; also known as Esmā‘īlābād) is a village in Dasht-e Zarrin Rural District, in the Central District of Kuhrang County, Chaharmahal and Bakhtiari Province, Iran. As per the 2006 census, its population was 78, distributed amongst 13 families. The village is populated by Lurs.
