= Esmailabad, Zarqan =

Esmailabad اسماعيل اباد
- Village
- Location within Iran
- Coordinates: 29°41′18″N 52°56′18″E
- Country: Iran
- Province: Fars
- County: Shiraz
- Bakhsh: Zarqan
- Rural District: Band-e Amir

Population (2006)
  - Total: 75
- Time zone: UTC+3:30 (IRST)
  - Summer (DST): UTC+4:30 (IRDT)

Esmailabad (Persian: اسماعيل اباد, also Romanized as Esmā‘īlābād; also known as Esmā‘īlābād-e Marvdasht and Esma‘īlābād Marvdasht) is a village in Band-e Amir Rural District, Zarqan District, Shiraz County, Fars province, Iran. In 2006, its population was 75, in 20 families.
