= Esmailabad, Marvdasht =

Esmailabad اسماعيل اباد
- Village
- Location within Iran
- Coordinates: 29°47′57″N 53°03′08″E
- Country: Iran
- Province: Fars
- County: Marvdasht
- Bakhsh: Central
- Rural District: Mohammadabad

Population (2006)
  - Total: 570
- Time zone: UTC+3:30 (IRST)
  - Summer (DST): UTC+4:30 (IRDT)

Esmailabad (Persian: اسماعيل اباد, also Romanized as Esmā‘īlābād; also known as Esmā‘īlābād-e Marvdasht and Esma‘il Abad Marvdasht) is a village in Mohammadabad Rural District, in the Central District of Marvdasht County, Fars province, Iran. At the 2006 census, its population was 570, in 138 families.
