= Samiabad-e Arbab Din Mohammad =

City in Razavi Khorasan province, Iran

Samiabad-e Arbab Din Mohammad Persian: سميع ابادارباب دين محمد
- City
- Location within Iran
- Coordinates: 35°08′49″N 60°54′17″E
- Country: Iran
- Province: Razavi Khorasan
- County: Torbat-e Jam
- District: Pain Jam
- Established as a city: 2017

Population (2016)
  - Total: 1,617
- Time zone: UTC+3:30 (IRST)

Samiabad-e Arbab Din Mohammad (Persian: سميع ابادارباب دين محمد) (Note: Also romanized as Samī‘ābād-e Arbāb Dīn Moḩammad) is a city in, and the capital of, Pain Jam District in Torbat-e Jam County, Razavi Khorasan province, Iran. It also serves as the administrative center for Zam Rural District. (Note: Formerly Pain Jam Rural District)

== Demographics ==
=== Population ===
At the time of the 2006 National Census, Samiabad-e Arbab Din Mohammad's population was 1,408 in 314 households, when it was a village in Zam Rural District. The following census in 2011 counted 1,862 people in 468 households. The 2016 census measured the population of the city as 1,617 people in 445 households.

The village of Samiabad-e Arbab Din Mohammad was converted to a city in 2017.
