= Esmailabad, Kerman =

Esmailabad اسماعيل اباد
- Village
- Location within Iran
- Coordinates: 30°13′53″N 56°40′05″E
- Country: Iran
- Province: Kerman
- County: Kerman
- Bakhsh: Central
- Rural District: Baghin

Population (2006)
  - Total: 33
- Time zone: UTC+3:30 (IRST)
  - Summer (DST): UTC+4:30 (IRDT)

Esmailabad (Persian: اسماعيل اباد, also Romanized as Esmā‘īlābād; also known as Ismā‘īlābād) is a village in Baghin Rural District, in the Central District of Kerman County, Kerman Province, Iran. At the 2006 census, its population was 33, in 9 families.
