= Chaharbagh =

City in Alborz province, Iran

Chaharbagh Persian: چهارباغ
- City
- Flag

- Location within Iran
- Coordinates: 35°50′25″N 50°50′53″E
- Country: Iran
- Province: Alborz
- County: Chaharbagh
- District: Central
- Established as a city: 2005

Population (2016)
  - Total: 48,828
- Time zone: UTC+3:30 (IRST)

Chaharbagh (Persian: چهارباغ) (Note: Formerly the village of Chahar Dangeh (چهار دانگه), also romanized as Chahār Dāngeh) is a city in the Central District (Note: Formerly Chaharbagh District of Savojbolagh County) of Chaharbagh County, Alborz province, Iran, serving as capital of both the county and the district. It was the administrative center for Chahardangeh Rural District until its capital was transferred to the village of Sonqorabad. The village of Chahardangeh was converted to the city of Chaharbagh in 2005.

== Demographics ==
=== Population ===
At the time of the 2006 National Census, the city's population was 5,577 in 1,448 households, when it was in Savojbolagh County of Tehran province. The 2016 census measured the population of the city as 48,828 inhabitants in 14,380 households, by which time the county had been separated from the province in the establishment of Alborz province.

In 2020, the district was separated from the county in establishing Chaharbagh County and renamed the Central District. Chaharbagh became the new county's capital.

== See also ==
Malekabad-e Hammanlu and Mehdiabad, neighborhoods in Chaharbagh
