= Rüstəmlı, Sabirabad =

Rüstəmlı
- Municipality
- Location within Azerbaijan
- Coordinates: 39°51′49″N 48°43′27″E
- Country: Azerbaijan
- Rayon: Sabirabad

Population
  - Total: 651
- Time zone: UTC+4 (AZT)
  - Summer (DST): UTC+5 (AZT)

Rüstəmlı (also, Rustam and Rustamly) is a village and municipality in the Sabirabad Rayon of Azerbaijan. It has a population of 651.
