= Arababad-e Afshar Rural District =

Rural district in Alborz province, Iran

Arababad-e Afshar Rural District Persian: دهستان عرب‌آباد افشار
- Rural District
- Location within Iran
- Coordinates: 35°48′N 50°44′E
- Country: Iran
- Province: Alborz
- County: Chaharbagh
- District: Central
- Established: 2020
- Capital: Arababad-e Khosravi
- Time zone: UTC+3:30 (IRST)

Arababad-e Afshar Rural District (Persian: دهستان عرب‌آباد افشار) is in the Central District (Note: Formerly Chaharbagh District of Savojbolagh County) of Chaharbagh County, Alborz province, Iran. Its capital is the village of Arababad-e Khosravi, whose population at the time of the 2016 National Census was 1,869 people in 647 households.

== History ==
In 2010, Savojbolagh County was separated from Tehran province in the establishment of Alborz province.

In 2020, Chaharbagh District (Note: Renamed the Central District of Chaharbagh County) was separated from the county in establishing Chaharbagh County and renamed the Central District. Arababad-e Afshar Rural District was created in the district.

=== Other villages in the rural district ===
- Esmailabad Shur Qaleh-ye Bala
- Esmailabad Shur Qaleh-ye Pain
- Soltanabad
