= Zakiabad, Mazandaran =

Zakiabad زكي اباد
- Village
- Location within Iran
- Coordinates: 36°31′41″N 52°02′29″E
- Country: Iran
- Province: Mazandaran
- County: Nur
- Bakhsh: Central
- Rural District: Natel Kenar-e Olya

Population (2006)
  - Total: 28
- Time zone: UTC+3:30 (IRST)
  - Summer (DST): UTC+4:30 (IRDT)

Zakiabad (Persian: زكي اباد, also Romanized as Zakīābād and Zekīābād) is a village in Natel Kenar-e Olya Rural District, in the Central District of Nur County, Mazandaran Province, Iran. At the 2006 census, its population was 28, in 8 families.
