= Esmailabad-e Moin =

Esmailabad-e Moin اسماعيل ابادمعين
- Village
- Location within Iran
- Coordinates: 35°32′20″N 51°26′05″E
- Country: Iran
- Province: Tehran
- County: Rey
- Bakhsh: Kahrizak
- Rural District: Kahrizak

Population (2006)
  - Total: 1,341
- Time zone: UTC+3:30 (IRST)
  - Summer (DST): UTC+4:30 (IRDT)

Esmailabad-e Moin (Persian: اسماعيل ابادمعين, also Romanized as Esma‘īlābād-e Mo‘īn; also known as Esma‘īlābād) is a village in Kahrizak Rural District, Kahrizak District, Ray County, Tehran Province, Iran. At the 2006 census, its population was 1,341, in 332 families.
