= Esmailabad, Saveh =

Esmailabad اسمعيل اباد
- Village
- Location within Iran
- Coordinates: 35°00′04″N 50°06′06″E
- Country: Iran
- Province: Markazi
- County: Saveh
- Bakhsh: Central
- Rural District: Shahsavan Kandi

Population (2006)
  - Total: 27
- Time zone: UTC+3:30 (IRST)
  - Summer (DST): UTC+4:30 (IRDT)

Esmailabad (Persian: اسمعيل اباد, also Romanized as Esmā‘īlābād) is a village in Shahsavan Kandi Rural District, in the Central District of Saveh County, Markazi Province, Iran. At the 2006 census, its population was 27, in 8 families.
