= Tang-e Esmail =

Tang-e Esmail تنگ اسماعيل
- Village
- Location within Iran
- Coordinates: 34°21′29″N 45°58′37″E
- Country: Iran
- Province: Kermanshah
- County: Sarpol-e Zahab
- Bakhsh: Central
- Rural District: Qaleh Shahin

Population (2006)
  - Total: 400
- Time zone: UTC+3:30 (IRST)
  - Summer (DST): UTC+4:30 (IRDT)

Tang-e Esmail (Persian: تنگ اسماعيل, also Romanized as Tang-e Esmā‘īl; also known as Esmā‘īlābād) is a village in Qaleh Shahin Rural District, in the Central District of Sarpol-e Zahab County, Kermanshah Province, Iran. At the 2006 census, its population was 400, in 89 families.
