= Chahardangeh Rural District (Chaharbagh County) =

Rural district in Alborz province, Iran

Chahardangeh Rural District Persian: دهستان چهاردانگه
- Rural District
- Location within Iran
- Coordinates: 35°50′N 50°50′E
- Country: Iran
- Province: Alborz
- County: Chaharbagh
- District: Central
- Capital: Sonqorabad

Population (2016)
  - Total: 5,233
- Time zone: UTC+3:30 (IRST)

Chahardangeh Rural District (Persian: دهستان چهاردانگه) is in the Central District (Note: Formerly Chaharbagh District of Savojbolagh County) of Chaharbagh County, Alborz province, Iran. Its capital is the village of Sonqorabad. The previous capital of the rural district was the village of Chahar Dangeh, now the city of Chaharbagh.

== Demographics ==
=== Population ===
At the time of the 2006 National Census, the rural district's population (as a part of Chaharbagh District (Note: Renamed the Central District of Chaharbagh County) in Savojbolagh County, Tehran province) was 38,598 in 9,638 households. The 2016 census measured the population of the rural district as 5,233 in 1,703 households, by which time the county had been separated from the province in the establishment of Alborz province. The most populous of its 23 villages was Arababad-e Khosravi, (Note: Transferred to Arababad-e Afshar Rural District) with 1,869 people.

=== Other villages in the rural district ===
- Aqdasiyeh
- Bi Sim-e Kamalabad
- Kuy-e Behruz
- Quheh
- Shahrak-e Elahiyeh

In 2020, the district was separated from the county in establishing Chaharbagh County and renamed the Central District.
