= Ramjin Rural District =

Rural district in Alborz province, Iran

Ramjin Rural District Persian: دهستان رامجين
- Rural District
- Location within Iran
- Coordinates: 35°52′N 50°47′E
- Country: Iran
- Province: Alborz
- County: Chaharbagh
- District: Ramjin
- Capital: Ramjin

Population (2016)
  - Total: 23,348
- Time zone: UTC+3:30 (IRST)

Ramjin Rural District (Persian: دهستان رامجين) is a rural district in Ramjin District, Chaharbagh County, Alborz province, Iran. Its capital is the village of Ramjin.

== Demographics ==
=== Population ===
At the time of the 2006 National Census, the rural district's population (as a part of Chaharbagh District (Note: Renamed the Central District of Chaharbagh County) in Savojbolagh County, Tehran province) was 16,960 in 4,294 households. The 2016 census measured the population of the rural district as 23,348 in 7,347 households, by which time the county had been separated from the province in the establishment of Alborz province. The most populous of its 23 villages was Lashkarabad, with 7,198 people.

In 2020, the district was separated from the county in establishing Chaharbagh County and renamed the Central District. The rural district was transferred to the new Ramjin District.

=== Other villages in the rural district ===
- Dehkadeh-ye Taleqani
- Mohammadabad-e Afshar
- Qasemabad-e Gorji
- Rundeh
- Shahrak-e Afshariyeh
- Tavusiyeh
