= Buzhgan District =

District in Razavi Khorasan province, Iran

Buzhgan District Persian: بخش بوژگان
- District
- Location within Iran
- Coordinates: 35°03′N 60°51′E
- Country: Iran
- Province: Razavi Khorasan
- County: Torbat-e Jam
- Established: 2003
- Capital: Nilshahr

Population (2016)
  - Total: 20,976
- Time zone: UTC+3:30 (IRST)

Buzhgan District (Persian: بخش بوژگان) is in Torbat-e Jam County, Razavi Khorasan province, Iran. Its capital is the city of Nilshahr. (Note: Formerly the village of Nilabad)

== History ==
The village of Ahmadabad-e Sowlat was converted to a city in 2007.

== Demographics ==
=== Population ===
At the time of the 2006 National Census, the district's population was 18,400 in 3,916 households. The following census in 2011 counted 19,209 people in 4,612 households. The 2016 census measured the population of the district as 20,976 inhabitants in 5,522 households.

=== Administrative divisions ===
Buzhgan District Population
Administrative Divisions	2006	2011	2016
Dasht-e Jam RD	7,296	422	4
Harirud RD	4,430	5,232	5,275
Ahmadabad-e Sowlat (city)		6,758	8,326
Nilshahr (city)	6,674	6,797	7,371
Total	18,400	19,209	20,976
RD = Rural District

== Notable people ==
Astronomer Abu al-Wafa' Buzjani was born in the district.
