= Ramjin District =

District in Alborz province, Iran

Ramjin District Persian: بخش رامجين
- District
- Location within Iran
- Coordinates: 35°52′N 50°45′E
- Country: Iran
- Province: Alborz
- County: Chaharbagh
- Established: 2020
- Capital: Ramjin
- Time zone: UTC+3:30 (IRST)

Ramjin District (Persian: بخش رامجين) is in Chaharbagh County, Alborz province, Iran. Its capital is the village of Ramjin, whose population at the time of the 2016 National Census was 1,999 in 673 households.

== History ==
In 2010, Savojbolagh County was separated from Tehran province in the establishment of Alborz province.

In 2020, Chaharbagh District (Note: Renamed the Central District of Chaharbagh County) was separated from the county in establishing Chaharbagh County and renamed the Central District. The new county was divided into two districts of two rural districts each, with the city of Chaharbagh (Note: Formerly the village of Chahar Dangeh) as its capital and only city at the time.

== Demographics ==
=== Administrative divisions ===
Ramjin District
Administrative Divisions
Aghlan Tappeh RD
Ramjin RD
RD = Rural District
