= Pain Jam District =

District in Razavi Khorasan province, Iran

Pain Jam District Persian: بخش پائین جام
- District
- Location within Iran
- Coordinates: 35°14′N 60°57′E
- Country: Iran
- Province: Razavi Khorasan
- County: Torbat-e Jam
- Established: 2003
- Capital: Samiabad-e Arbab Din Mohammad

Population (2016)
  - Total: 19,577
- Time zone: UTC+3:30 (IRST)

Pain Jam District (Persian: بخش پائین جام) is in Torbat-e Jam County, Razavi Khorasan province, Iran. Its capital is the city of Samiabad-e Arbab Din Mohammad.

== Demographics ==
=== Population ===
At the time of the 2006 National Census, the district's population was 16,555 in 3,483 households. The following census in 2011 counted 18,925 people in 4,453 households. The 2016 census measured the population of the district as 19,577 inhabitants in 5,227 households.

=== Administrative divisions ===
Pain Jam District Population
Administrative Divisions	2006	2011	2016
Gol Banu RD	7,998	9,088	9,338
Zam RD (Note: Formerly Pain Jam Rural District)	8,557	9,837	10,239
Samiabad-e Arbab Din Mohammad (city) (Note: Became a city after the 2016 census)			
Total	16,555	18,925	19,577
RD = Rural District
