= Yevlakh District =

District in central Azerbaijan

Coordinates: 40°40′N 47°00′E

- District
- Map of Azerbaijan showing Yevlakh District
- Country: Azerbaijan
- Region: Central Aran
- Established: 5 February 1935
- Capital: Yevlakh
- Settlements: 50

Government
  - Governor: Anar Taghiyev

Area
  - Total: 1,470 km^{2} (570 sq mi)

Population (2020)
  - Total: 129,700
  - Density: 88.2/km^{2} (229/sq mi)
- Time zone: UTC+4 (AZT)
- Postal code: 6600
- Website: yevlax-ih.gov.az

Yevlakh District (Azerbaijani: Yevlax rayonu) is one of the 66 districts of Azerbaijan. It is located in the centre of the country and belongs to the Central Aran Economic Region. The district borders the districts of Qakh, Shaki, Agdash, Barda, Tartar, Goranboy, and Samukh. Its capital and largest city is Yevlakh. As of 2020, the district had a population of 129,700. The southeast section of Mingachevir reservoir is in this district.

== History ==
Yevlakh was called as a Yevlakh village of Elisabethpol Governorate on official documents belonging to the beginning of the 19th century, was called as Dzhevanshirsky Uyezd during the years between 1920 and 1935. The Yevlakh region was created on February 20, 1935, by the decision of the Central Executive Committee of the Azerbaijan SSR. Yevlakh became a city on February 1, 1939, according to the decision of the Supreme Soviet of the Azerbaijan SSR.

Yevlakh-Khankendi, Yevlakh-Balakan railway, Yevlakh Airport, Khaldan village secondary school, Chess school, Children's youth sports school, 19 secondary schools with 10535 seats, 15 kindergartens with 840 seats, a hospital, educational establishments, multi-storey residential buildings were commissioned and put into operation.

On 26 December 1962, the Yevlakh area was cancelled and its domain was exchanged to Agdash, Barda and Gasim Ismayilov district by the choice of the 10th session of the Supreme Soviet of the Azerbaijan SSR and turned into the industrial city of Yevlakh republic. Yevlakh has been a free region since 1965.

On 6 January 1965, Yevlakh was included in the list of subordinated cities and the development of industrial undertakings has been started in Yevlakh by the decree of the Presidium of the Supreme Soviet of the Azerbaijani SSR.

== Economy ==
Yevlakh is one of the important agricultural districts of the country. The grain and cotton growing, as well as cattle breeding sectors have played an important role in the city economy. The farmers grow potato, vegetable, water-melon and fruits, as well.

Yevlakh city is also rich with natural resources like clay mixture sand deposits, as well as clay, sand and gravel deposits needed for brick making.

Baku-Gazakh highway, Yevlakh-Balakan, Baku-Tbilisi railway, Baku-Supsa gas and Baku-Tbilisi-Jeyhan oil pipeline extend through the territory of the district. Yevlakh city also has a domestic airport.

== Relief ==
Yevlakh is 293 km far from Baku on the right bank of the Kura waterway. (South-east of Ganja-Gazakh plain, the north-western portion of Shirvan and Garabagh fields). Yevlakh is on the old Silk Way. There are a mild-warm semi-desert and dry field climate within the winter. Kura waterway, Inchachay, Korchay and Alican passes through the domain. In the south eastern portion of Mingachevir water store, the Varvara water store is found in Yevlakh. Upper Garabagh and Upper Shirvan canals are within the district.

== Population ==
Table of population of the district.

Town and Region	01.01.2004			01.01.2005			01.01.2006			01.01.2007			01.01.2008			01.01.2009			01.01.2010			01.01.2011			01.01.2012		
Town and Region	Total	Men	Women	Total	Men	Women	Total	Men	Women	Total	Men	Women	Total	Men	Women	Total	Men	Women	Total	Men	Women	Total	Men	Women	Total	Men	Women
Yevlakh town	111,5	53,2	58,3	112,6	53,6	59,0	114,0	54,2	59,8	115,3	54,6	60,7	116,4	55,0	61,4	117,6	55,4	62,2	118,4	55,9	62,5	119,6	56,5	63,1	121,2	57,3	63,9
urban population	60,5	28,4	32,1	61,2	28,5	32,7	62,0	28,7	33,3	62,7	28,8	33,9	64,0	29,3	34,7	64,7	29,5	35,2	65,1	29,7	35,4	65,5	30,0	35,5	65,9	30,2	35,7
Yevlakh town	53,8	25,1	28,7	54,4	25,2	29,2	55,1	25,3	29,8	55,7	25,4	30,3	56,9	25,9	31,0	57,6	26,1	31,5	57,9	26,3	31,6	58,3	26,5	31,8	58,7	26,7	32,0
Duzdagh settlement	0,4	0,2	0,2	0,4	0,2	0,2	0,4	0,2	0,2	0,5	0,2	0,3	0,4	0,2	0,2	0,4	0,2	0,2	0,4	0,2	0,2	0,4	0,2	0,2	0,4	0,2	0,2
Meyvaly settlement	0,3	0,1	0,2	0,3	0,1	0,2	0,3	0,1	0,2	0,3	0,1	0,2	0,3	0,1	0,2	0,3	0,1	0,2	0,3	0,1	0,2	0,3	0,1	0,2	0,3	0,1	0,2
Aran settlement	6,0	3,0	3,0	6,1	3,0	3,1	6,2	3,1	3,1	6,2	3,1	3,1	6,4	3,1	3,3	6,4	3,1	3,3	6,5	3,1	3,4	6,5	3,2	3,3	6,5	3,2	3,3
rural population	51,0	24,8	26,2	51,4	25,1	26,3	52,0	25,5	26,5	52,6	25,8	26,8	52,4	25,7	26,7	52,9	25,9	27,0	53,3	26,2	27,1	54,1	26,5	27,6	55,3	27,1	28,2

== Education ==
There are 57 general education schools in the region. Ten of these schools are located in the city and 47 are in the settlements and villages of Yevlakh district. 26 kindergartens operate in Yevlakh district; 7 of them are located in the city and 19 in the villages. In addition, there are 5 educational institutions such as two Children's Youth Sports Schools, Chess School, Children's Creative Center and Technical Creative Center.
