= Chaharbagh County =

County in Alborz province, Iran

Chaharbagh County Persian: شهرستان چهارباغ
- County
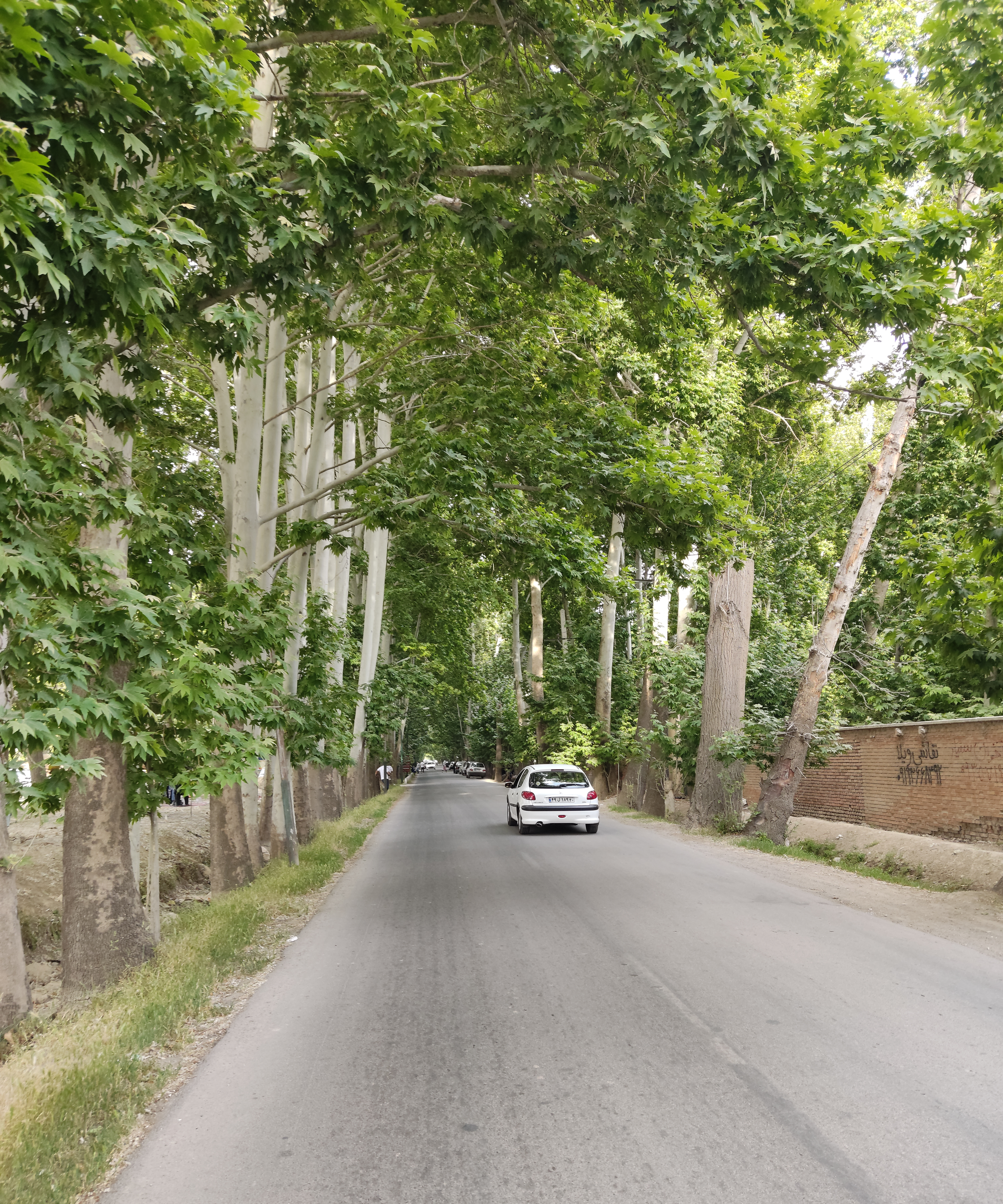

- Location of Chaharbagh County in Alborz province (center, purple)

- Location of Alborz province in Iran
- Coordinates: 35°50′N 50°45′E
- Country: Iran
- Province: Alborz
- Established: 2020
- Capital: Chaharbagh
- Districts: Central, Ramjin
- Time zone: UTC+3:30 (IRST)

Chaharbagh County (Persian: شهرستان چهارباغ) is in Alborz province, Iran. Its capital is the city of Chaharbagh, (Note: Formerly the village of Chahar Dangeh) whose population at the time of the 2016 National Census was 48,828 in 14,380 households.

== History ==
In 2010, Savojbolagh County was separated from Tehran province in the establishment of Alborz province.

In 2020, Chaharbagh District (Note: Renamed the Central District of Chaharbagh County) was separated from the county in establishing Chaharbagh County and renamed the Central District. The new county was divided into two districts of two rural districts each, with Chaharbagh as its capital and only city at the time.

== Demographics ==
=== Administrative divisions ===
Chaharbagh County's administrative structure is shown in the following table.

Chaharbagh County
Administrative Divisions
Central District (Note: Formerly Chaharbagh District of Savojbolagh County)
Arababad-e Afshar RD
Chahardangeh RD
Chaharbagh (city)
Ramjin District
Aghlan Tappeh RD
Ramjin RD
RD = Rural District
