= Central District (Chaharbagh County) =

District in Alborz province, Iran

Central District (Chaharbagh County) Persian: بخش مرکزی شهرستان چهارباغ
- District
- Location within Iran
- Coordinates: 35°49′N 50°49′E
- Country: Iran
- Province: Alborz
- County: Chaharbagh
- Capital: Chaharbagh

Population (2016)
  - Total: 77,409 (Note: As Chaharbagh District of Savojbolagh County)
- Time zone: UTC+3:30 (IRST)

The Central District of Chaharbagh County (Persian: بخش مرکزی شهرستان چهارباغ) (Note: Formerly Chaharbagh District (بخش چهارباغ) of Savojbolagh County) is in Alborz province, Iran. (Note: Formerly the village of Chahar Dangeh)

== History ==
In 2010, Savojbolagh County was separated from Tehran province in the establishment of Alborz province.

In 2020, Chaharbagh District (Note: Renamed the Central District of Chaharbagh County) was separated from the county in establishing Chaharbagh County and renamed the Central District. The new county was divided into two districts of two rural districts each, with Chaharbagh as its capital and only city at the time.

== Demographics ==
=== Population ===
At the time of the 2006 National Census, the district's population (as Chaharbagh District of Savojbolagh County in Tehran province) was 61,135 in 15,380 households. The 2016 census measured the population of the district as 77,409 in 23,430 households.

=== Administrative divisions ===
Central District (Chaharbagh County) (Note: As Chaharbagh District at the 2006 and 2016 censuses)
Administrative Divisions	2006	2016
Arababad-e Afshar RD (Note: Established after the 2016 census)		
Chahardangeh RD	38,598	5,233
Ramjin RD (Note: Transferred to Ramjin District)	16,960	23,348
Chaharbagh (city)	5,577	48,828
Total	61,135	77,409
RD = Rural District
