= Torbat-e Jam County =

County in Razavi Khorasan province, Iran

Torbat-e Jam County Persian: شهرستان تربت جام
- County
- Location of Torbat-e Jam County in Razavi Khorasan province (right, purple)

- Location of Razavi Khorasan province in Iran
- Coordinates: 35°20′N 60°37′E
- Country: Iran
- Province: Razavi Khorasan
- Capital: Torbat-e Jam
- Districts: Central, Buzhgan, Nasrabad, Pain Jam

Area
  - Total: 4,967 km^{2} (1,918 sq mi)

Population (2016)
  - Total: 267,671
  - Density: 53.89/km^{2} (139.6/sq mi)
- Time zone: UTC+3:30 (IRST)

Torbat-e Jam County (Persian: شهرستان تربت جام) is in Razavi Khorasan province, Iran. Its capital is the city of Torbat-e Jam.

== History ==
The village of Ahmadabad-e Sowlat was converted to a city in 2007, and likewise the village of Samiabad-e Arbab Din Mohammad in 2017. Salehabad District was separated from the county in the establishment of Salehabad County the following year.

== Demographics ==
=== Population ===
At the time of the 2006 National Census, the county's population was 239,395, in 53,510 households. The following census in 2011 counted 262,712 people in 65,817 households. The 2016 census measured the population of the county as 267,671 in 71,802 households.

=== Administrative divisions ===
Torbat-e Jam County's population history and administrative structure over three consecutive censuses are shown in the following table.

Torbat-e Jam County Population
Administrative Divisions	2006	2011	2016
Central District	123,799	138,638	143,252
Jamrud RD	9,651	10,743	10,724
Jolgeh-ye Musaabad RD	7,728	8,932	8,212
Miyan Jam RD	22,862	24,205	23,867
Torbat-e Jam (city)	83,558	94,758	100,449
Buzhgan District	18,400	19,209	20,976
Dasht-e Jam RD	7,296	422	4
Harirud RD	4,430	5,232	5,275
Ahmadabad-e Sowlat (city)		6,758	8,326
Nilshahr (city) (Note: Formerly the village of Nilabad)	6,674	6,797	7,371
Nasrabad District	37,429	40,245	40,440
Bala Jam RD	11,412	11,723	12,243
Karizan RD	19,182	20,765	20,737
Nasrabad (city)	6,835	7,757	7,460
Pain Jam District	16,555	18,925	19,577
Gol Banu RD	7,998	9,088	9,338
Zam RD (Note: Formerly Pain Jam Rural District)	8,557	9,837	10,239
Samiabad-e Arbab Din Mohammad (city) (Note: Became a city after the 2016 census)			
Salehabad District (Note: Transferred to Salehabad County)	43,212	45,695	43,426
Bagh-e Keshmir RD	10,011	10,379	10,607
Jannatabad RD	10,087	9,610	8,162
Qaleh Hamam RD	7,687	8,404	8,477
Salehabad RD	7,147	7,660	7,555
Salehabad (city)	8,280	9,642	8,625
Total	239,395	262,712	267,671
RD = Rural District

== See also ==
Media related to Torbat-e Jam County at Wikimedia Commons
