= List of tombs of Iranian people =

Person(s)	Significance	Location of Tomb	Article
Cyrus the Great	the founder of the Persian Empire under the Achaemenid dynasty	Pasargadae near the city of Shiraz, Iran	Pasargadae
Darius I, Xerxes I, Artaxerxes I, Darius II and Darius III	emperors of the Achaemenid dynasty	Naqsh-e Rustam near the city of Shiraz, Iran	Naqsh-e Rustam
Artaxerxes II and Artaxerxes III	emperors of the Achaemenid dynasty	Persepolis near the city of Shiraz, Iran	Persepolis
Mausolus	Persian satrap of Caria	Halicarnassus (present Bodrum, Turkey); the origin of the word "mausoleum"- the tomb is now destroyed	Mausoleum of Maussollos
Mithridatic dynasty	rulers of the Kingdom of Pontus (and later briefly the Bosporan Kingdom)	Amasya, Turkey	Tombs of the kings of Pontus
Abu Lu'lu'a Firuz (d. 644)	assassin of the second Islamic caliph Umar	Kashan, Iran	Shrine of Abu Lu'lu'a
Yaqub Leith Saffari (840-879)	ruler of the Saffarid dynasty	Shahabad (ancient Gondishapur) near Dezful, Iran	none
Amir Esmail Samani (d. 907)	ruler of the Samanid dynasty	Bukhara, Uzbekistan	Samanid Mausoleum
Qabus ebn Voshmgir (d. 1012)	ruler of the Ziyarid dynasty	Gonbad, Iran	none
Khwajeh Nezam ol-Molk (1018–1092)	vizier of Malekshah	Isfahan, Iran	none
Shah Shoja' (d. 1384)	ruler of the Mozaffarid dynasty and patron of Hafez	Shiraz, Iran	none
Gawhar Shad (d. 1457)	wife of Shah Rukh of the Timurid dynasty and founder of Gawhar Shad Mosque	Herat, Afghanistan	Gawhar Shad Mausoleum
Nader Shah (1688–1747)	Shah of Iran and the founder of the Afsharid dynasty	Mashhad, Iran	none
Karim Khan (1705–1779)	the ruler and de facto Shah of Iran of the Zand dynasty	Shiraz, Iran	Pars Museum of Shiraz
Naser ed-Din Shah (1831–1896) and Sattar Khan (1868–1914)	shah of Iran of the Qajar dynasty who was assassinated in the same shrine on May 1, 1896 and pivotal figure of the Constitutional Revolution, respectively	Rey, Iran	Shah-Abdol-Azim shrine
Reza Shah (1878–1944)	Shah of Iran of the Pahlavi dynasty	Rey, Iran demolished in 1979 after the Iranian Revolution	Reza Shah's mausoleum
Mohammad Reza Pahlavi (1919–1980)	The second Shah of Iran of the Pahlavi dynasty	Cairo, Egypt	Al-Rifa'i Mosque
Bayazid Bastami (804-874)	Persian mystic	Bastam, Iran	none
Sheikh Abulhassan Kharaqani (963-1033)	Persian mystic	Kharaqan near Bastam, Iran	none
Ali Hujwiri (990-1077)	Persian mystic	Lahore, Pakistan	Data Durbar Complex
Khwajeh Abdollah Ansari (1006–1088)	Persian mystic	Herat, Afghanistan	Khwaja 'Abd Allah Ansari shrine
Sheikh Ahmad Jami (1048–1141)	Persian mystic	Torbat-e Jam, Iran	Sheikh Ahmad-e Jami mausoleum complex
Abdol-Qader Gilani (1077–1166)	Persian mystic and founder of the Qaderi Sufi Order	Baghdad, Iraq	none
Qotbeddin Heydar (1137–1221)	Persian mystic	Torbat-e Heydarieh, Iran	none
Moinoddin Chishti (1141–1230)	Persian mystic and founder of Chishti Order	Ajmer, India	none
Sheikh Abdolsamad Esfahani (13th century)	Persian mystic	Natanz, Iran	none
Sheikh Mohammad Bakran (d. 1303)	Persian mystic	near Isfahan, Iran	Pir-i Bakran
Amu Abdollah (d. 1316)	Persian mystic	near Isfahan, Iran	Manar Jonban
Sheikh Zahed Gilani (1216–1301)	Persian mystic and Murshid of Sheikh Safieddin Ardabili	Lahijan, Iran	none
Sheikh Safieddin Ardabili (1252–1334)	Persian mystic and eponym of the Safavid dynasty	Ardabil, Iran - Ismail I the founder of the Safavid dynasty is also buried there	none
Khwajeh Zeinoddin Shirazi (1302–1370)	Persian mystic	Khuldabad, India	none
Baha ed-Din Naqshband Bukhari (1318–1389)	Persian mystic and founder of Naqshbandi Order	Bukhara, Uzbekistan	none
Shah Nimatullah Wali (1330–1431)	Persian mystic and founder of the Nematollahi Sufi Order	Mahan, Iran, Iran	Shah Nematollah Vali Shrine
Sibaveih (760-797)	Persian linguist	Shiraz, Iran	none
Imam Bukhari (810-870)	Persian Sunni scholar	near Samarkand, Uzbekistan	none
Ebn-e Babveih (d. 941)	Persian Shi'ite scholar	Rey, Iran	Ebn-e Babveih
Rabe'eh Balkhi (10th century)	Persian poet	Balkh, Afghanistan	none
Ferdowsi (940-1020)	Persian poet	Tus, Iran	Tomb of Ferdowsi
Avicenna (980-1037)	Persian philosopher and physician	Hamedan, Iran	Avicenna Mausoleum
Baba Taher (11th century)	Persian mystic and poet	Hamedan, Iran	none
Asadi Tusi (d. 1072), Anvari (1126–1189), Homam Tabrizi (1238–1315), Khaqani (1121–1190), Qatran Tabrizi (1009–1072) and Shahriar (1906–1988)	Persian poets	Tabriz, Iran	Maqbarat ol-Shoara
Abu Hamed Ghazali (1058–1111)	Persian theologian, philosopher and mystic	Tus, Iran	none
Ahmad Ghazali (1061–1126)	Persian writer and mystic and brother of Abu Hamed Ghazali	Qazvin, Iran	none
Omar Khayyám (1048–1131)	Persian poet	Nishapur, Iran	none
Sanai Ghaznavi (1080–1131)	Persian poet	Ghazni, Afghanistan	none
Sheikh Ruzbehan (1129–1209)	Persian mystic and poet	Shiraz, Iran	none
Nezami (1141–1209)	Persian poet	Ganja, Azerbaijan	Nezami Mausoleum
Attar (1145–1221)	Persian mystic and poet	Nishapur, Iran	none
Mowlavi (Rumi) (1207–1273) and Sultan Walad (d. 1312)	Persian mystics and poets	Konya, Turkey	Mevlana Museum
Saadi (1184–1291)	Persian poet	Shiraz, Iran	none
Hamdollah Mostowfi (1281–1349)	Persian historian and geographer	Qazvin, Iran	none
Khwaju Kermani (1280–1352)	Persian mystic and poet	Shiraz, Iran	none
Hafez (1315–1390)	Persian poet	Shiraz, Iran	Tomb of Hafez
Jami (1414–1492)	Persian mystic and poet	Herat, Afghanistan	none
Saib Tabrizi (1601–1677)	Persian poet	Isfahan, Iran	none
Mir Emad Qazvini (1553–1614)	Persian calligrapher	Isfahan, Iran	none
Sheikh Bahaii (1547–1621)	Persian architect and poet	Mashhad, Iran	none
Bidel Dehlavi (1640–1721)	Persian mystic and poet	Delhi, India	none
Kamal ol-Molk (1847–1940)	Iran painter	Nishapur, Iran	none
Iraj Mirza (1874–1926), Bahar (1884–1951), Forugh Farrokhzad (1935–1967), Rahi Moayyeri (1909–1968), Darvish Khan (1872–1926), Ruhollah Khaleqi (1906–1965), Abolhasan Saba (1902–1957) and Qamar ol-Moluk Vaziri (1905–1959)	Persian poets, musicians and singers	Tehran, Iran	Zahir-od-dowleh cemetery
Sadeq Hedayat (1903–1951) and Gholam-Hossein Saedi (1936–1985)	Persian writers	Paris, France	Père Lachaise Cemetery
Salman the Persian	Persian companion of Muhammad	Salman Pak (ancient Ctesiphon), Iraq	none
