= Gandah Khalu =

Gandah Khalu گنده خالو
- Village
- Location within Iran
- Coordinates: 35°19′56″N 60°24′01″E
- Country: Iran
- Province: Razavi Khorasan
- County: Torbat-e Jam
- Bakhsh: Central
- Rural District: Mian Jam

Population (2006)
  - Total: 82
- Time zone: UTC+3:30 (IRST)
  - Summer (DST): UTC+4:30 (IRDT)

Gandah Khalu (Persian: گنده خالو, also Romanized as Gandah Khālū; also known as Gandakhālū) is a village in Mian Jam Rural District, in the Central District of Torbat-e Jam County, Razavi Khorasan Province, Iran. At the 2006 census, its population was 82, in 17 families.
