= Kamarcheh-ye Sofla =

Kamarcheh-ye Sofla كمرچه سفلي
- Village
- Location within Iran
- Coordinates: 35°34′48″N 60°42′43″E
- Country: Iran
- Province: Razavi Khorasan
- County: Torbat-e Jam
- Bakhsh: Central
- Rural District: Jolgeh-ye Musaabad

Population (2006)
  - Total: 199
- Time zone: UTC+3:30 (IRST)
  - Summer (DST): UTC+4:30 (IRDT)

Kamarcheh-ye Sofla (Persian: كمرچه سفلي, also Romanized as Kamarcheh-ye Soflá; also known as Kamarcheh and Kamarchehhā) is a village in Jolgeh-ye Musaabad Rural District, in the Central District of Torbat-e Jam County, Razavi Khorasan Province, Iran. At the 2006 census, its population was 199, in 37 families.
