= Samar Ghaveh =

Samar Ghaveh سمرغاوه
- Village
- Location within Iran
- Coordinates: 35°19′07″N 60°22′10″E
- Country: Iran
- Province: Razavi Khorasan
- County: Torbat-e Jam
- Bakhsh: Central
- Rural District: Mian Jam

Population (2006)
  - Total: 146
- Time zone: UTC+3:30 (IRST)
  - Summer (DST): UTC+4:30 (IRDT)

Samar Ghaveh (Persian: سمرغاوه, also Romanized as Samar Ghāveh; also known as Samarqāveh, Sāmārgava, Samar Gāveh, and Sāmār Qāvā) is a village in Mian Jam Rural District, in the Central District of Torbat-e Jam County, Razavi Khorasan Province, Iran. At the 2006 census, its population was 146, in 40 families.
