= Jalilabad, Torbat-e Jam =

Jalilabad جليل اباد
- Village
- Location within Iran
- Coordinates: 35°25′02″N 60°27′29″E
- Country: Iran
- Province: Razavi Khorasan
- County: Torbat-e Jam
- Bakhsh: Central
- Rural District: Mian Jam

Population (2006)
  - Total: 610
- Time zone: UTC+3:30 (IRST)
  - Summer (DST): UTC+4:30 (IRDT)

Jalilabad (Persian: جليل اباد, also Romanized as Jalīlābād; also known as Khalīlābād and Qal‘eh-ye Tavakkolī) is a village in Mian Jam Rural District, in the Central District of Torbat-e Jam County, Razavi Khorasan Province, Iran. At the 2006 census, its population was 610, in 140 families.
