= Kalateh-ye Sefid =

Kalateh-ye Sefid كلاته سفيد
- Village
- Location within Iran
- Coordinates: 35°16′51″N 60°19′54″E
- Country: Iran
- Province: Razavi Khorasan
- County: Torbat-e Jam
- Bakhsh: Central
- Rural District: Mian Jam

Population (2006)
  - Total: 30
- Time zone: UTC+3:30 (IRST)
  - Summer (DST): UTC+4:30 (IRDT)

Kalateh-ye Sefid (Persian: كلاته سفيد, also Romanized as Kalāteh-ye Sefīd and Kalāteh Sefīd) is a village in Mian Jam Rural District, in the Central District of Torbat-e Jam County, Razavi Khorasan Province, Iran. At the 2006 census, its population was 30, in 8 families.
