= Teymanak =

Teymanak (Persian: تيمنك) may refer to:

- Teymanak-e Olya
- Teymanak-e Sofla
