= Jabbar Beyg =

Jabbar Beyg جبار بيگ
- Village
- Location within Iran
- Coordinates: 35°35′26″N 60°40′55″E
- Country: Iran
- Province: Razavi Khorasan
- County: Torbat-e Jam
- Bakhsh: Central
- Rural District: Jolgeh-ye Musaabad

Population (2006)
  - Total: 158
- Time zone: UTC+3:30 (IRST)
  - Summer (DST): UTC+4:30 (IRDT)

Jabbar Beyg (Persian: جبار بيگ, also Romanized as Jabbār Beyg and Jabbār Beyk; also known as Kalāteh-ye Qāz̤ī) is a village in Jolgeh-ye Musaabad Rural District, in the Central District of Torbat-e Jam County, Razavi Khorasan Province, Iran. At the 2006 census, its population was 158, in 28 families.
