= Qaleh Now-e Mirza Jafar =

Qaleh Now-e Mirza Jafar قلعه نوميرزاجعفر
- Village
- Location within Iran
- Coordinates: 35°21′40″N 60°29′05″E
- Country: Iran
- Province: Razavi Khorasan
- County: Torbat-e Jam
- Bakhsh: Central
- Rural District: Mian Jam

Population (2006)
  - Total: 614
- Time zone: UTC+3:30 (IRST)
  - Summer (DST): UTC+4:30 (IRDT)

Qaleh Now-e Mirza Jafar (Persian: قلعه نوميرزاجعفر, also Romanized as Qal‘eh Now-e Mīrzā Ja‘far and Qal‘eh Now Mīrzā Ja‘far) is a village in Mian Jam Rural District, in the Central District of Torbat-e Jam County, Razavi Khorasan Province, Iran. At the 2006 census, its population was 614, in 138 families.
