= Chah Mirza =

Chah Mirza may refer to:

- Chah Mirza Bala
- Chah Mirza Pain
