= Nik Pey, Razavi Khorasan =

Nik Pey نيك پي
- Village
- Location within Iran
- Coordinates: 35°16′04″N 60°23′40″E
- Country: Iran
- Province: Razavi Khorasan
- County: Torbat-e Jam
- Bakhsh: Central
- Rural District: Mian Jam

Population (2006)
  - Total: 232
- Time zone: UTC+3:30 (IRST)
  - Summer (DST): UTC+4:30 (IRDT)

Nik Pey (Persian: نيك پي, also Romanized as Nīk Pey) is a village in Mian Jam Rural District, in the Central District of Torbat-e Jam County, Razavi Khorasan Province, Iran. At the 2006 census, its population was 232, in 59 families.
