= Pol Varzeh =

Pol Varzeh پل ورزه
- Village
- Location within Iran
- Coordinates: 35°16′28″N 60°23′31″E
- Country: Iran
- Province: Razavi Khorasan
- County: Torbat-e Jam
- Bakhsh: Central
- Rural District: Mian Jam

Population (2006)
  - Total: 480
- Time zone: UTC+3:30 (IRST)
  - Summer (DST): UTC+4:30 (IRDT)

Pol Varzeh (Persian: پل ورزه, also Romanized as Pal Varzah) is a village in Mian Jam Rural District, in the Central District of Torbat-e Jam County, Razavi Khorasan Province, Iran. At the 2006 census, its population was 480, in 96 families.
