= Chah Mazar =

Chah Mazar (Persian: چاه مزار) may refer to:

- Chah Mazar-e Olya
- Chah Mazar-e Sofla
- Chah-e Mazar
