= Qaleh Sorkh =

Qaleh Sorkh or Qaleh-ye Sorkh or Qaleh-e Sorkh or Qaleh Surkh (Persian: قلعه سرخ) may refer to:

- Qaleh-ye Sorkh, Falavarjan, Isfahan Province
- Qaleh Sorkh, Fereydunshahr, Isfahan Province
- Qaleh Sorkh, Kermanshah
- Qaleh Sorkh, Bakharz, Razavi Khorasan Province
- Qaleh-ye Sorkh, Torbat-e Jam, Torbat-e Jam County, Razavi Khorasan Province
- Qaleh-ye Sorkh, Nasrabad, Torbat-e Jam County, Razavi Khorasan Province
- Qaleh Sorkh, South Khorasan
