= Toqoz =

Toqoz or Tuqoz (Persian: تق قز) may refer to:

- Toqoz-e Olya
- Toqoz-e Sofla
