= Langar, Torbat-e Jam =

Langar لنگر
- Village
- Location within Iran
- Coordinates: 35°23′03″N 60°26′09″E
- Country: Iran
- Province: Razavi Khorasan
- County: Torbat-e Jam
- Bakhsh: Central
- Rural District: Mian Jam

Population (2006)
  - Total: 769
- Time zone: UTC+3:30 (IRST)
  - Summer (DST): UTC+4:30 (IRDT)

Langar (Persian: لنگر, also Romanized as Lengar; also known as Kharjerd) is a village in Mian Jam Rural District, in the Central District of Torbat-e Jam County, Razavi Khorasan Province, Iran. At the 2006 census, its population was 769, in 167 families.
