= Bagh Sangan =

Bagh Sangan or Bagh-e Sangan (Persian: باغ سنگان) may refer to:

- Bagh Sangan-e Olya
- Bagh Sangan-e Sofla
