= Buteh Gaz =

Buteh Gaz (Persian: بوته گز) may refer to:

- Buteh Gaz, Mashhad
- Buteh Gaz, Torbat-e Jam
