= Talkhak =

Talkhak تلخك
- Village
- Location within Iran
- Coordinates: 35°32′48″N 60°41′16″E
- Country: Iran
- Province: Razavi Khorasan
- County: Torbat-e Jam
- Bakhsh: Central
- Rural District: Jolgeh-ye Musaabad

Population (2006)
  - Total: 255
- Time zone: UTC+3:30 (IRST)
  - Summer (DST): UTC+4:30 (IRDT)

Talkhak (Persian: تلخك) is a village in Jolgeh-ye Musaabad Rural District, in the Central District of Torbat-e Jam County, Razavi Khorasan Province, Iran. At the 2006 census, its population was 255, in 57 families.
