= Jangabad =

Jangabad may refer to:

- Jangabad, Isfahan
- Jangabad, Razavi Khorasan
