= Amghan =

Village in Razavi Khorasan province, Iran

Amghan Persian: امغان
- Village
- Location within Iran
- Coordinates: 35°22′29″N 60°30′19″E
- Country: Iran
- Province: Razavi Khorasan
- County: Torbat-e Jam
- District: Central
- Rural District: Miyan Jam

Population (2016)
  - Total: 1,284
- Time zone: UTC+3:30 (IRST)

Amghan (Persian: امغان) (Note: Also romanized as Amghān; also known as Amghām and Amghān-e Bālā) is a village in Miyan Jam Rural District of the Central District in Torbat-e Jam County, Razavi Khorasan province, Iran.

== Demographics ==
=== Population ===
At the time of the 2006 National Census, the village's population was 1,383 in 305 households. The following census in 2011 counted 1,325 people in 358 households. The 2016 census measured the population of the village as 1,284 people in 380 households.
