= Hasanabad-e Mulavi =

Village in Razavi Khorasan province, Iran

Hasanabad-e Mulavi Persian: حسن آباد مولوي
- Village
- Location within Iran
- Coordinates: 35°15′00″N 60°40′33″E
- Country: Iran
- Province: Razavi Khorasan
- County: Torbat-e Jam
- District: Central
- Rural District: Jamrud

Population (2016)
  - Total: 1,261
- Time zone: UTC+3:30 (IRST)

Hasanabad-e Mulavi (Persian: حسن آباد مولوي) (Note: Also romanized as Ḩasanābād-e Mūlavī; formerly known as Hasanabad (حسن اباد), also romanized as Ḩasanābād) is a village in Jamrud Rural District of the Central District in Torbat-e Jam County, Razavi Khorasan province, Iran.

== Demographics ==
=== Population ===
At the time of the 2006 National Census, the village's population, as Hasanabad, was 1,104 in 231 households. The following census in 2011 counted 1,273 people in 298 households. The 2016 census measured the population of the village as 1,261 people in 315 households, by which time it was listed as Hasanabad-e Mulavi.
