= Bagh Sangan-e Sofla =

Bagh Sangan-e Sofla باغ سنگان سفلي
- Village
- Location within Iran
- Coordinates: 35°13′26″N 60°36′12″E
- Country: Iran
- Province: Razavi Khorasan
- County: Torbat-e Jam
- Bakhsh: Central
- Rural District: Mian Jam

Population (2006)
  - Total: 136
- Time zone: UTC+3:30 (IRST)
  - Summer (DST): UTC+4:30 (IRDT)

Bagh Sangan-e Sofla (Persian: باغ سنگان سفلي, also Romanized as Bāgh Sangān-e Soflá; also known as Bāgh-e Sangān-e Pā’īn and Bāgh-e Sangān) is a village in Mian Jam Rural District, in the Central District of Torbat-e Jam County, Razavi Khorasan Province, Iran. At the 2006 census, its population was 136, in 36 families.

== See also ==
- List of cities, towns and villages in Razavi Khorasan Province
