= Mahmanshahr-e Torbat-e Jam =

Village in Razavi Khorasan province, Iran

Mahmanshahr-e Torbat-e Jam Persian: مهمانشهرتربت جام
- Village
- Location within Iran
- Coordinates: 35°18′07″N 60°31′59″E
- Country: Iran
- Province: Razavi Khorasan
- County: Torbat-e Jam
- District: Central
- Rural District: Miyan Jam

Population (2016)
  - Total: 2,308
- Time zone: UTC+3:30 (IRST)

Mahmanshahr-e Torbat-e Jam (Persian: مهمانشهرتربت جام) (Note: Also romanized as Mahmānshahr-e Torbat-e Jām) is a village in Miyan Jam Rural District of the Central District in Torbat-e Jam County, Razavi Khorasan province, Iran.

== Demographics ==
=== Population ===
At the time of the 2006 National Census, the village's population was 3,186 in 641 households. The following census in 2011 counted 2,992 people in 680 households. The 2016 census measured the population of the village as 2,308 people in 517 households.
