= Rovenj =

Village in Razavi Khorasan province, Iran

Rovenj Persian: رونج
- Village
- Location within Iran
- Coordinates: 35°18′22″N 60°19′41″E
- Country: Iran
- Province: Razavi Khorasan
- County: Torbat-e Jam
- District: Central
- Rural District: Miyan Jam

Population (2016)
  - Total: 1,424
- Time zone: UTC+3:30 (IRST)

Rovenj (Persian: رونج) (Note: Also romanized as Ravanj; also known as Ravinj, Roveyj, Rūbanj, and Rūnīj) is a village in Miyan Jam Rural District of the Central District in Torbat-e Jam County, Razavi Khorasan province, Iran.

== Demographics ==
=== Population ===
At the time of the 2006 National Census, the village's population was 1,835 in 418 households. The following census in 2011 counted 1,666 people in 472 households. The 2016 census measured the population of the village as 1,424 people in 405 households.
