= Almejuq-e Sofla =

Village in Razavi Khorasan province, Iran

Almejuq-e Sofla Persian: المجوق سفلي
- Village
- Location within Iran
- Coordinates: 35°30′42″N 60°33′44″E
- Country: Iran
- Province: Razavi Khorasan
- County: Torbat-e Jam
- District: Central
- Rural District: Jolgeh-ye Musaabad

Population (2016)
  - Total: 1,085
- Time zone: UTC+3:30 (IRST)

Almejuq-e Sofla (Persian: المجوق سفلي) (Note: Also romanized as Almejūq-e Soflá; also known as Almejoq-e Pā’īn and Almejūq-e Pā’īn) is a village in Jolgeh-ye Musaabad Rural District of the Central District in Torbat-e Jam County, Razavi Khorasan province, Iran.

== Demographics ==
=== Population ===
At the time of the 2006 National Census, the village's population was 895 in 184 households. The following census in 2011 counted 950 people in 245 households. The 2016 census measured the population of the village as 1,085 people in 281 households.
