= Mahmudabad-e Sofla, Razavi Khorasan =

Village in Razavi Khorasan province, Iran

Mahmudabad-e Sofla Persian: محمودابادسفلي
- Village
- Location within Iran
- Coordinates: 35°23′20″N 60°26′59″E
- Country: Iran
- Province: Razavi Khorasan
- County: Torbat-e Jam
- District: Central
- Rural District: Miyan Jam

Population (2016)
  - Total: 1,745
- Time zone: UTC+3:30 (IRST)

Mahmudabad-e Sofla (Persian: محمودابادسفلي) (Note: Also romanized as Maḩmūdābād-e Soflá; also known as Mahmūdābād, Maḩmūdābād Pā’īn, Maḩmūdābād-e Pā’īn, Moḩammadābād, and Muhammadābād) is a village in Miyan Jam Rural District of the Central District in Torbat-e Jam County, Razavi Khorasan province, Iran.

== Demographics ==
=== Population ===
At the time of the 2006 National Census, the village's population was 1,953 in 455 households. The following census in 2011 counted 2,023 people in 552 households. The 2016 census measured the population of the village as 1,745 people in 490 households.
