= Changabad-e Jadid =

Changabad-e Jadid چنگ ابادجديد
- Village
- Location within Iran
- Coordinates: 35°22′46″N 60°41′31″E
- Country: Iran
- Province: Razavi Khorasan
- County: Torbat-e Jam
- Bakhsh: Central
- Rural District: Jamrud

Population (2006)
  - Total: 59
- Time zone: UTC+3:30 (IRST)
  - Summer (DST): UTC+4:30 (IRDT)

Changabad-e Jadid (Persian: چنگ ابادجديد, also Romanized as Changābād-e Jadīd; also known as Changābād and Jangābād) is a village in Jamrud Rural District, in the Central District of Torbat-e Jam County, Razavi Khorasan Province, Iran. At the 2006 census, its population was 59, in 12 families.
