= Gur Band, Razavi Khorasan =

Village in Razavi Khorasan province, Iran

Gur Band Persian: گوربند
- Village
- Location within Iran
- Coordinates: 35°22′37″N 60°47′20″E
- Country: Iran
- Province: Razavi Khorasan
- County: Torbat-e Jam
- District: Central
- Rural District: Jamrud

Population (2016)
  - Total: 453
- Time zone: UTC+3:30 (IRST)

Gur Band (Persian: گوربند) (Note: Also romanized as Gūr Band; also known as Garband Ribāt and Gorband-e Robāţ) is a village in Jamrud Rural District of the Central District in Torbat-e Jam County, Razavi Khorasan province, Iran.

== Demographics ==
=== Population ===
At the time of the 2006 National Census, the village's population was 324 in 70 households. The following census in 2011 counted 356 people in 97 households. The 2016 census measured the population of the village as 453 people in 123 households.
