= Kalateh-ye Marvi =

Village in Razavi Khorasan province, Iran

Kalateh-ye Marvi Persian: كلاته مروي
- Village
- Location within Iran
- Coordinates: 35°24′34″N 60°27′46″E
- Country: Iran
- Province: Razavi Khorasan
- County: Torbat-e Jam
- District: Central
- Rural District: Miyan Jam

Population (2016)
  - Total: 1,184
- Time zone: UTC+3:30 (IRST)

Kalateh-ye Marvi (Persian: كلاته مروي) (Note: Also romanized as Kalāteh-ye Marvī; also known as Mowrī) is a village in Miyan Jam Rural District of the Central District in Torbat-e Jam County, Razavi Khorasan province, Iran.

== Demographics ==
=== Population ===
At the time of the 2006 National Census, the village's population was 967 in 200 households. The following census in 2011 counted 1,023 people in 247 households. The 2016 census measured the population of the village as 1,184 people in 303 households.
