= Qaleh-ye Sorkh, Torbat-e Jam =

Village in Razavi Khorasan, Iran

Qaleh-ye Sorkh قلعه سرخ
- Village
- Location within Iran
- Coordinates: 35°36′23″N 60°31′15″E
- Country: Iran
- Province: Razavi Khorasan
- County: Torbat-e Jam
- Bakhsh: Central
- Rural District: Jolgeh-ye Musaabad

Population (2006)
  - Total: 70
- Time zone: UTC+3:30 (IRST)
  - Summer (DST): UTC+4:30 (IRDT)

Qaleh-ye Sorkh (Persian: قلعه سرخ, also Romanized as Qal‘eh-ye Sorkh and Qal‘eh Sorkh; also known as Qal‘a Surkhi, Qal‘eh Shorkh, Qal‘eh Sorkhī, and Qal‘eh Surkhi) is a village in Jolgeh-ye Musaabad Rural District, in the Central District of Torbat-e Jam County, Razavi Khorasan Province, Iran. At the 2006 census, its population was 70, in 15 families.
