= Firuzkuh, Razavi Khorasan =

Village in Razavi Khorasan province, Iran

Firuzkuh Persian: فيروزكوه
- Village
- Location within Iran
- Coordinates: 35°26′13″N 60°48′26″E
- Country: Iran
- Province: Razavi Khorasan
- County: Torbat-e Jam
- District: Central
- Rural District: Jamrud

Population (2016)
  - Total: 858
- Time zone: UTC+3:30 (IRST)

Firuzkuh (Persian: فيروزكوه) (Note: Also romanized as Firuz Kuh, Fīrūz Kūh, and Fīrūzkūh) is a village in Jamrud Rural District of the Central District in Torbat-e Jam County, Razavi Khorasan province, Iran.

== Demographics ==
=== Population ===
At the time of the 2006 National Census, the village's population was 826 in 166 households. The following census in 2011 counted 990 people in 240 households. The 2016 census measured the population of the village as 858 people in 203 households.
