= Cheshmeh Gol, Torbat-e Jam =

Village in Razavi Khorasan province, Iran

Cheshmeh Gol Persian: چشمه گل
- Village
- Location within Iran
- Coordinates: 35°22′21″N 60°42′25″E
- Country: Iran
- Province: Razavi Khorasan
- County: Torbat-e Jam
- District: Central
- Rural District: Jamrud

Population (2016)
  - Total: 1,561
- Time zone: UTC+3:30 (IRST)

Cheshmeh Gol (Persian: چشمه گل) (Note: Also romanized as Chashmeh Gol; also known as Ma’dan-e-Cheshmeh Gol) is a village in, and the capital of, Jamrud Rural District in the Central District of Torbat-e Jam County, Razavi Khorasan province, Iran.

== Demographics ==
=== Population ===
At the time of the 2006 National Census, the village's population was 1,284 in 303 households. The following census in 2011 counted 1,476 people in 370 households. The 2016 census measured the population of the village as 1,561 people in 413 households.
