= Deh Kushkak =

Village in Razavi Khorasan province, Iran

Deh Kushkak Persian: ده كوشكك
- Village
- Location within Iran
- Coordinates: 35°22′02″N 60°47′37″E
- Country: Iran
- Province: Razavi Khorasan
- County: Torbat-e Jam
- District: Central
- Rural District: Jamrud

Population (2016)
  - Total: 457
- Time zone: UTC+3:30 (IRST)

Deh Kushkak (Persian: ده كوشكك) (Note: Also romanized as Deh Kūshḵaḵ) is a village in Jamrud Rural District of the Central District in Torbat-e Jam County, Razavi Khorasan province, Iran.

== Demographics ==
=== Population ===
At the time of the 2006 National Census, the village's population was 382 in 77 households. The following census in 2011 counted 467 people in 125 households. The 2016 census measured the population of the village as 457 people in 119 households.
