= Buteh Gaz, Torbat-e Jam =

Buteh Gaz بوته گز
- Village
- Location within Iran
- Coordinates: 35°27′28″N 60°46′55″E
- Country: Iran
- Province: Razavi Khorasan
- County: Torbat-e Jam
- Bakhsh: Central
- Rural District: Jamrud

Population (2006)
  - Total: 115
- Time zone: UTC+3:30 (IRST)
  - Summer (DST): UTC+4:30 (IRDT)

Buteh Gaz (Persian: بوته گز, also Romanized as Būteh Gaz) is a village in Jamrud Rural District, in the Central District of Torbat-e Jam County, Razavi Khorasan Province, Iran. At the 2006 census, its population was 115, in 28 families.
