= Musaabad, Torbat-e Jam =

Village in Razavi Khorasan province, Iran

Musaabad Persian: موسي اباد
- Village
- Location within Iran
- Coordinates: 35°35′08″N 60°36′31″E
- Country: Iran
- Province: Razavi Khorasan
- County: Torbat-e Jam
- District: Central
- Rural District: Jolgeh-ye Musaabad

Population (2016)
  - Total: 1,026
- Time zone: UTC+3:30 (IRST)

Musaabad (Persian: موسي اباد) (Note: Also romanized as Mūsáābād; also known as Mūsáābād-e Jām) is a village in, and the capital of, Jolgeh-ye Musaabad Rural District in the Central District of Torbat-e Jam County, Razavi Khorasan province, Iran.

== Demographics ==
=== Population ===
At the time of the 2006 National Census, the village's population was 968 in 230 households. The following census in 2011 counted 1,177 people in 281 households. The 2016 census measured the population of the village as 1,026 people in 285 households.
