= Yaqutin-e Jadid =

Village in Razavi Khorasan province, Iran

Yaqutin-e Jadid Persian: ياقوتين جديد
- Village
- Location within Iran
- Coordinates: 35°16′54″N 60°39′33″E
- Country: Iran
- Province: Razavi Khorasan
- County: Torbat-e Jam
- District: Central
- Rural District: Jamrud

Population (2016)
  - Total: 2,701
- Time zone: UTC+3:30 (IRST)

Yaqutin-e Jadid (Persian: ياقوتين جديد) (Note: Also romanized as Yāqūtīn-e Jadīd; also known as Yāqūtain, Yāqūtī, and Yāqūtīn) is a village in Jamrud Rural District of the Central District in Torbat-e Jam County, Razavi Khorasan province, Iran.

== Demographics ==
=== Population ===
At the time of the 2006 National Census, the village's population was 2,488 in 557 households. The following census in 2011 counted 2,876 people in 735 households. The 2016 census measured the population of the village as 2,701 people in 707 households, the most populous in its rural district.
