= Qaderabad, Torbat-e Jam =

Village in Razavi Khorasan province, Iran

Qaderabad Persian: قادراباد
- Village
- Location within Iran
- Coordinates: 35°16′04″N 60°37′36″E
- Country: Iran
- Province: Razavi Khorasan
- County: Torbat-e Jam
- District: Central
- Rural District: Jamrud

Population (2016)
  - Total: 974
- Time zone: UTC+3:30 (IRST)

Qaderabad (Persian: قادراباد) (Note: Also romanized as Qāderābād; also known as Qādīrābād) is a village in Jamrud Rural District of the Central District in Torbat-e Jam County, Razavi Khorasan province, Iran.

== Demographics ==
=== Population ===
At the time of the 2006 National Census, the village's population was 718 in 149 households. The following census in 2011 counted 875 people in 220 households. The 2016 census measured the population of the village as 974 people in 255 households.
