= Kalateh-ye Hajji Qazi =

Village in Razavi Khorasan province, Iran

Kalateh-ye Hajji Qazi Persian: كلاته حاجي قاضي
- Village
- Location within Iran
- Coordinates: 35°36′17″N 60°40′09″E
- Country: Iran
- Province: Razavi Khorasan
- County: Torbat-e Jam
- District: Central
- Rural District: Jolgeh-ye Musaabad

Population (2016)
  - Total: 361
- Time zone: UTC+3:30 (IRST)

Kalateh-ye Hajji Qazi (Persian: كلاته حاجي قاضي) (Note: Also romanized as Kalāteh-ye Ḩājjī Qāẕī; also known as Chāhābād (چاه اباد) and Kalāteh-ye Qāẕī) is a village in Jolgeh-ye Musaabad Rural District of the Central District in Torbat-e Jam County, Razavi Khorasan province, Iran.

== Demographics ==
=== Population ===
At the time of the 2006 National Census, the village's population was 335 in 76 households. The following census in 2011 counted 385 people in 97 households. The 2016 census measured the population of the village as 361 people in 96 households.
