= Do Sang, Razavi Khorasan =

Village in Razavi Khorasan province, Iran

Do Sang Persian: دوسنگ
- Village
- Location within Iran
- Coordinates: 35°33′34″N 60°33′50″E
- Country: Iran
- Province: Razavi Khorasan
- County: Torbat-e Jam
- District: Central
- Rural District: Jolgeh-ye Musaabad

Population (2016)
  - Total: 778
- Time zone: UTC+3:30 (IRST)

Do Sang (Persian: دوسنگ) is a village in Jolgeh-ye Musaabad Rural District of the Central District in Torbat-e Jam County, Razavi Khorasan province, Iran.

== Demographics ==
=== Population ===
At the time of the 2006 National Census, the village's population was 650 in 128 households. The following census in 2011 counted 756 people in 201 households. The 2016 census measured the population of the village as 778 people in 196 households.
