= Esmailabad-e Gorji =

Village in Razavi Khorasan province, Iran

Esmailabad-e Gorji Persian: اسماعيل ابادگرجي
- Village
- Location within Iran
- Coordinates: 35°20′12″N 60°30′33″E
- Country: Iran
- Province: Razavi Khorasan
- County: Torbat-e Jam
- District: Central
- Rural District: Miyan Jam

Population (2016)
  - Total: 1,649
- Time zone: UTC+3:30 (IRST)

Esmailabad-e Gorji (Persian: اسماعيل ابادگرجي) (Note: Also romanized as Esmā‘īlābād-e Gorjī; also known as Esmā‘īlābād and Esmā‘īlābād-e Kalālī) is a village in, and the capital of, Miyan Jam Rural District in the Central District of Torbat-e Jam County, Razavi Khorasan province, Iran.

== Demographics ==
=== Population ===
At the time of the 2006 National Census, the village's population was 776 in 188 households. The following census in 2011 counted 775 people in 209 households. The 2016 census measured the population of the village as 1,649 people in 231 households.
