= Torbat-e Jam =

City in Razavi Khorasan province, Iran

Torbat-e Jam Persian: تربت جام
- City
- Location within Iran
- Coordinates: 35°14′35″N 60°37′30″E
- Country: Iran
- Province: Razavi Khorasan
- County: Torbat-e Jam
- District: Central

Population (2016)
  - Total: 100,449
- Time zone: UTC+3:30 (IRST)

Torbat-e Jam (Persian: تربت جام) (Note: Also romanized as Torbat-e Jām; also known as Torbat-e Jawm, Torbat-e Sheykh Jām, and Turbat-i-Shaikh Jam) is a city in the Central District of Torbat-e Jam County, Razavi Khorasan province, Iran, serving as capital of both the county and the district. It is one of the ancient cities of Greater Khorasan.

Torbat-e Jam is an ancient city with a Sunni-majority population. It is about 160 kilometres (99 mi) southwest of Mashhad, about 60 kilometres (37 mi) north of Taybad, and about 40 kilometres (25 mi) west of the Afghanistan border. There are many ancient places there, like the mazar (tomb) of Sheikh Ahmad Jami and Prince Qasem-e Anvar. The county includes many villages, such as Bezd, Mahmoodabad, Nilshahr.

== Demographics ==
=== Population ===
At the time of the 2006 National Census, the city's population was 83,558 in 19,111 households. The following census in 2011 counted 94,758 people in 23,970 households. The 2016 census measured the population of the city as 100,449 people in 27,156 households.

== Climate ==
Torbat-e Jam has a cold semi-arid climate (BSk) in the Köppen climate classification.

Climate data for Torbat-e Jam(1993-2010 normals), elevation: 950.4 m (3,118 ft)
| Month | Jan | Feb | Mar | Apr | May | Jun | Jul | Aug | Sep | Oct | Nov | Dec | Year |
|---|---|---|---|---|---|---|---|---|---|---|---|---|---|
| Mean daily maximum °C (°F) | 8.2 (46.8) | 11.3 (52.3) | 16.8 (62.2) | 23.1 (73.6) | 28.8 (83.8) | 33.3 (91.9) | 34.5 (94.1) | 33.7 (92.7) | 29.7 (85.5) | 24.1 (75.4) | 16.7 (62.1) | 10.3 (50.5) | 22.5 (72.6) |
| Daily mean °C (°F) | 2.7 (36.9) | 5.6 (42.1) | 10.5 (50.9) | 16.2 (61.2) | 21.3 (70.3) | 25.9 (78.6) | 27.7 (81.9) | 26.3 (79.3) | 21.5 (70.7) | 16.0 (60.8) | 9.8 (49.6) | 4.8 (40.6) | 15.7 (60.2) |
| Mean daily minimum °C (°F) | −2.8 (27.0) | −0.1 (31.8) | 4.2 (39.6) | 9.3 (48.7) | 13.8 (56.8) | 18.5 (65.3) | 20.8 (69.4) | 18.8 (65.8) | 13.3 (55.9) | 8.0 (46.4) | 3.0 (37.4) | −0.7 (30.7) | 8.8 (47.9) |
| Average precipitation mm (inches) | 22.5 (0.89) | 31.6 (1.24) | 41.7 (1.64) | 32.3 (1.27) | 14.6 (0.57) | 1.7 (0.07) | 0.2 (0.01) | 0.2 (0.01) | 0.7 (0.03) | 2.7 (0.11) | 8.7 (0.34) | 15.9 (0.63) | 172.8 (6.81) |
| Average relative humidity (%) | 67 | 63 | 59 | 52 | 39 | 30 | 28 | 26 | 30 | 39 | 53 | 66 | 46 |
| Average dew point °C (°F) | −3.9 (25.0) | −2.3 (27.9) | 1.4 (34.5) | 4.6 (40.3) | 5.6 (42.1) | 6.4 (43.5) | 7.9 (46.2) | 5.1 (41.2) | 2.2 (36.0) | 0.6 (33.1) | −1.0 (30.2) | −2.3 (27.9) | 2.0 (35.7) |
Source: Iran Meteorological Organization (m1993-2005), (dew point), (humidity 1987-2005), (precipitation)

== Music ==
Torbat-e-Jam music has a long history in Iranian culture. The dotar is the most important and common instrument among the people of Torbat-e-Jam, which is played with great skill. The music of this land originates from the heart of rituals and customs that are thousands of years old. Poetry reading, salawat reading, travel music, mothers' lullabies, educational music, prayers are some of the branches of vocal music in Torbat-e Jam. Reading couplets is also very common in Torbat-e Jam music, which includes romantic, emotional, mystical and other couplets.

== Dance ==
There are many local dances in the culture of the Torbat-e Jām people, but four types are more common: Hetan or Hatem dance: means the edges of a mountain or lion grove and a kind of mystical hearing. In which people make a circle and knock their feet to the ground while circling. Gradually, they accelerate their dance, clapping their arms together and making the circle smaller.

Hapelbazi: This dance is performed in such a way that one person performs movements inside the circle and the others follow him.

Stick play: This dance may be an example of fencing in ancient Iran, in which two people spin in a circle and hold two sticks in their hands, and the first person throws his sticks to the sticks of the second person, and whoever breaks his stick, goes out of the circle.

== Historical places ==
Sheikh Ahmad-e Jami Mausoleum Complex, Khatoon Bridge, Noor Mosque, Bazd Mountain, Leopard Mountain, Abe Bazd, Jahangir Abad Hill, Sarab Hill, Shore Qaleh Hill, Sadrabad Hill, Golden Hill, Qoshe Toot Hill, Garmab Hill, Glarcheh Hill, Ganjabad Hill, Khajeh Hesam, Estai Castle, Zurabad Castle, Faizabad Castle, Gabri Castle, Gosh Laghar Castle, Qanqar, Kariz Divan, Glar Sarem and Khajeh Azizullah Mosque are the scenic and historical places of this region.

== Handicrafts ==
The handicrafts of Torbat-e-Jam city are: carpet weaving, canvas weaving, towel weaving, Weaving large black nomadic tents, handkerchief weaving and night tent Hapelbazi: This dance is performed in such a way that one person performs movements inside the circle and the others follow him.making, traditional clothe weaving and also making pottery, It is one of the handicrafts of Torbat-e-Jam . Carpet weaving industry has been popular in this city since ancient times and has an export aspect. Carpets are usually woven at home and there are many carpet weaving workshops in the city. The carpets are marketed with Mashhad carpet design in red beads and brown colors.

== Agriculture ==
Torbat-e Jam is the center of agricultural production in eastern Iran, so that it has the largest population of people working in this field among other cities in Khorasan Razavi province. This city ranks first in the production of products such as melons, barley saffron, wheat and many summer crops in Khorasan province. Today, saffron and pistachio cultivation is increasing in different areas of Torbat-e Jam, so that this area has become one of the poles. Mangosteen or hazelnut is another agricultural product that is native to this region and is world famous.

== Industry ==
In the past, there were only a few factories with limited production in the field of food next to the sugar and flour factory in Torbat-e Jam industry, but in recent years, with the expansion of industrial towns and the establishment of parent industries such as cement factory and silica processing, the industrial landscape in this city is clear. It seams. However, due to the establishment of these industries in tourist areas and proximity to residential areas, their presence has been associated with environmental hazards.

== Monuments ==
Historic monuments in Torbat-e Jam, Khorasan province, have been under serious threat of destruction. The Ahmad-i Jam shrine complex has now been renovated with private and public funds from Iran's Cultural Heritage Organization.

The head of Torbat-e Jam Cultural Heritage and Tourism Department put the credit allocated for restoration of historic sites in the city at 550 million rials in the current year (started 21 March). He noted that from the total amount, 500 million rials was spent on Robat-e Jam historic site and the rest on Sheikh Ahmad Jami mausoleum—a complex comprising 10 buildings, ISNA reported. Taj-Mohammadi complained that given the number of monuments and the huge workload, the earmarked budget is insufficient. The other major historic sites of this northeastern city which face destruction are Robat-e Sangan, Khajeh Azizollah Mosque, Shah Qassem Anvar Mausoleum, Noor Mosque and Abouzar Bozjani Mausoleum, he warned. Torbat-e Jam is the birth and burial place of the renowned 11th century mystic Sheikh Ahmad Jami. The city is in fact named after the great mystic. Located on the mountains 163 kilometers east of Mashhad, Torbat-e Jam has a desert climate with wild pistachio forests and vast pastures. Torbat-e Jam and its neighbouring areas have a rich and beautiful local and mystical music.

== Higher education ==
Currently, two government higher education centers are located in Torbat-e Jam, Torbat-e-Jam Medical School and Torbat-e-Jam Higher Education Complex. Also Islamic Azad Universities and Payame Noor and Applied Sciences, Vahdat Institute of Higher Education.

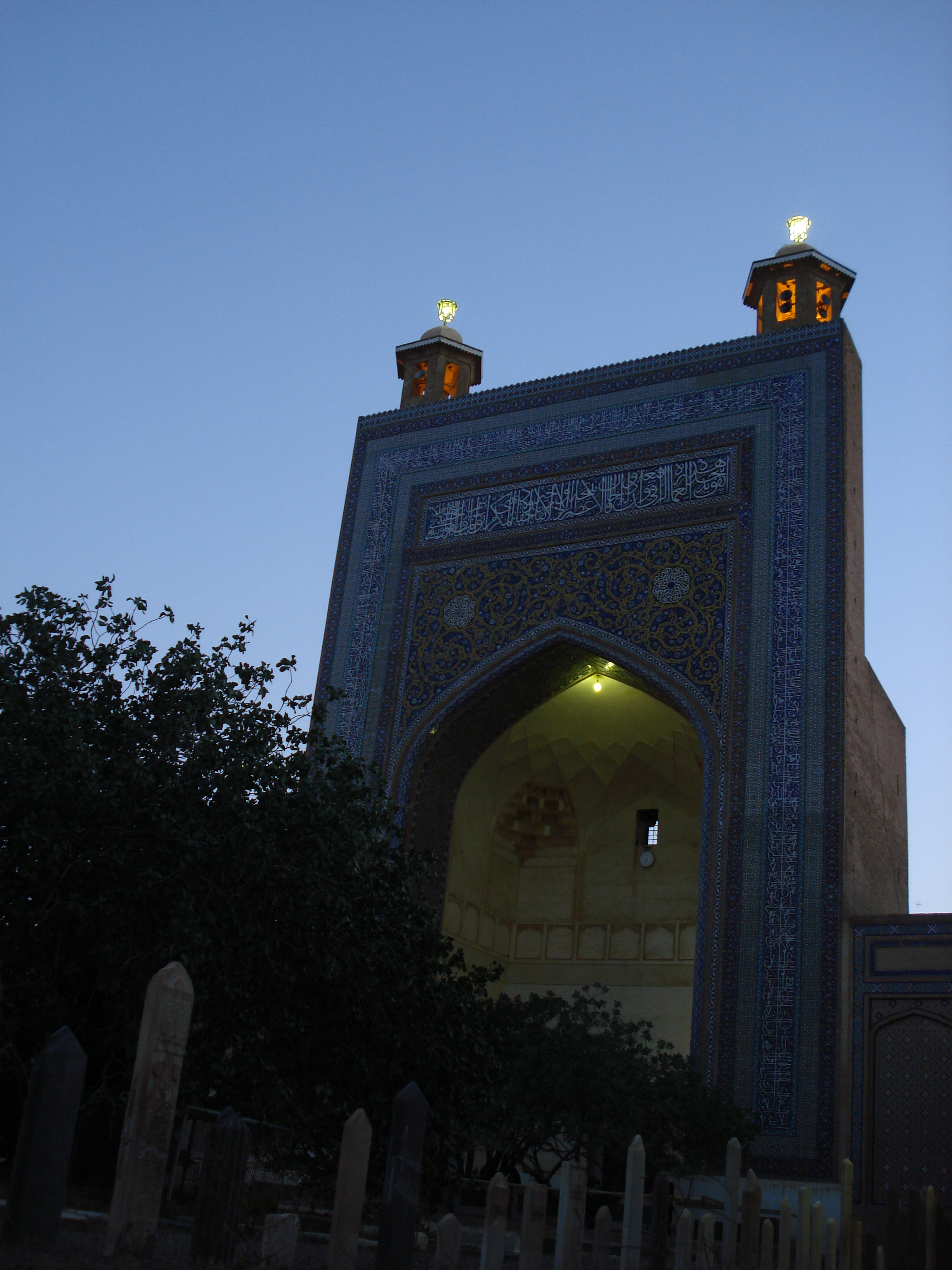
Sheikh Ahmad-e Jami mausoleum complex view at night

== Notable people ==
- Sheikh Ahmad Jami (1048–1142) – Sufi mystic
- Pur-Baha Jami – Iranian poet and satirist
- Ali Mohammad Moadab (born 1977) - poet
- Mohsen Namjoo (b. 1976) – alternative/indie singer-songwriter
- Abu al-Wafa' Buzjani (10 June 940 – 15 July 998) – a Persian mathematician and astronomer who worked in Baghdad
- Jami (7 November 1414 – 9 November 1492) – writer, mystic and one of the most prominent Sufi poets of the 15th century

== See also ==
Media related to Torbat-e Jam at Wikimedia Commons
