= Dars Akhund =

Village in Razavi Khorasan province, Iran

Dars Akhund Persian: درس اخوند
- Village
- Location within Iran
- Coordinates: 35°38′54″N 60°36′55″E
- Country: Iran
- Province: Razavi Khorasan
- County: Torbat-e Jam
- District: Central
- Rural District: Jolgeh-ye Musaabad

Population (2016)
  - Total: 554
- Time zone: UTC+3:30 (IRST)

Dars Akhund (Persian: درس اخوند) (Note: Also romanized as Dars Ākhūnd and Dars-e Ākhvond; also known as Dahāneh-ye Sākhū and Danān-i-Sākhu) is a village in Jolgeh-ye Musaabad Rural District of the Central District in Torbat-e Jam County, Razavi Khorasan province, Iran.

== Demographics ==
=== Population ===
At the time of the 2006 National Census, the village's population was 508 in 105 households. The following census in 2011 counted 543 people in 136 households. The 2016 census measured the population of the village as 554 people in 136 households.
