= Yekkeh Pesteh =

Village in Razavi Khorasan province, Iran

Yekkeh Pesteh Persian: يكه پسته
- Village
- Location within Iran
- Coordinates: 35°37′44″N 60°31′58″E
- Country: Iran
- Province: Razavi Khorasan
- County: Torbat-e Jam
- District: Central
- Rural District: Jolgeh-ye Musaabad

Population (2016)
  - Total: 548
- Time zone: UTC+3:30 (IRST)

Yekkeh Pesteh (Persian: يكه پسته) is a village in Jolgeh-ye Musaabad Rural District of the Central District in Torbat-e Jam County, Razavi Khorasan province, Iran.

== Demographics ==
=== Population ===
At the time of the 2006 National Census, the village's population was 655 in 139 households. The following census in 2011 counted 719 people in 182 households. The 2016 census measured the population of the village as 548 people in 168 households.
