= Moadab =

Moadab is a surname. Notable people with the surname include:

- Ali Mohammad Moadab (born 1977), Iranian poet
- Elias Moadab (1916–1952), Egyptian comedy actor
