= Nowdeh, Torbat-e Jam =

Village in Razavi Khorasan province, Iran

Nowdeh Persian: نوده
- Village
- Location within Iran
- Coordinates: 35°16′47″N 60°26′45″E
- Country: Iran
- Province: Razavi Khorasan
- County: Torbat-e Jam
- District: Central
- Rural District: Miyan Jam

Population (2016)
  - Total: 1,110
- Time zone: UTC+3:30 (IRST)

Nowdeh (Persian: نوده) is a village in Miyan Jam Rural District of the Central District in Torbat-e Jam County, Razavi Khorasan province, Iran.

== Demographics ==
=== Population ===
At the time of the 2006 National Census, the village's population was 971 in 226 households. The following census in 2011 counted 1,164 people in 281 households. The 2016 census measured the population of the village as 1,110 people in 270 households.
