= Chah Mazar-e Sofla =

Chah Mazar-e Sofla چاه مزارسفلي
- Village
- Location within Iran
- Coordinates: 35°40′26″N 60°35′22″E
- Country: Iran
- Province: Razavi Khorasan
- County: Torbat-e Jam
- Bakhsh: Central
- Rural District: Jolgeh-ye Musaabad

Population (2006)
  - Total: 300
- Time zone: UTC+3:30 (IRST)
  - Summer (DST): UTC+4:30 (IRDT)

Chah Mazar-e Sofla (Persian: چاه مزارسفلي, also Romanized as Chāh Mazār-e Soflá and Chāh-e Mazār Soflá; also known as Chāh Mazar, Chāh Mazār-e Pā’īn, and Chāh Mīrzā Pā’īn) is a village in Jolgeh-ye Musaabad Rural District, in the Central District of Torbat-e Jam County, Razavi Khorasan Province, Iran. At the 2006 census, its population was 300, in 72 families.
