= Abbas Foroughi Bastami =

Iranian poet (1798–1857)

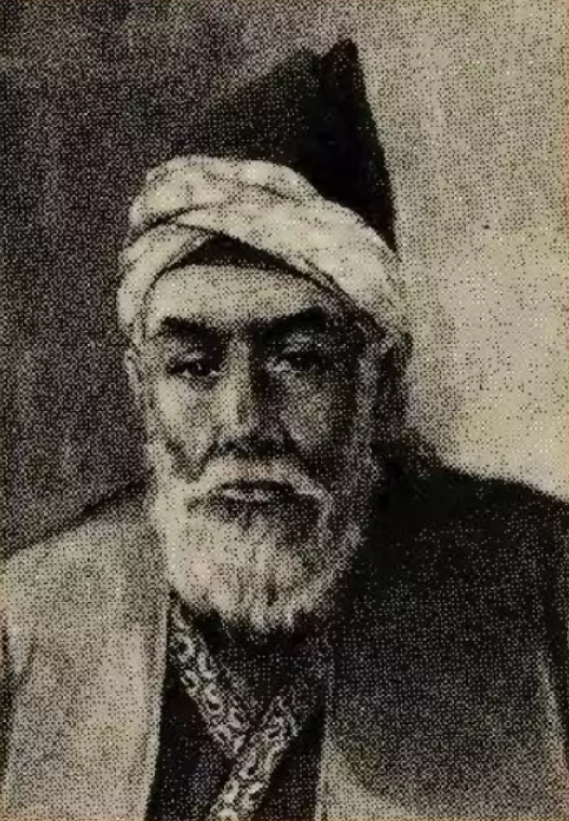
- Illustration of Abbas Foroughi Bastami
- Born: 1798; Karbala, Ottoman Iraq
- Died: 1857 (aged 58 or 59); Tehran, Qajar Iran
- Occupation: Poet
- Writing career
- Language: Persian

Abbas Foroughi Bastami (Persian: عباس فروغی بسطامی; 1798–1857) was an Iranian poet of the Qajar era.

== Early life ==
Foroughi was born in the city of Karbala. He was the son of Aqa Musa, who worked as an accountant at the court of Agha Mohammad Khan Qajar (r. 1789–1797), the Qajar shah (king) of Iran. Following Aqa Musa's decline in popularity and subsequent punishment by Agha Mohammad Khan, he relocated to Karbala, where he died in 1814. Soon afterwards, Foroughi moved to Sari in Mazandaran, where he for some years lived with uncle Dust-Ali Khan Moayyer ol-Mamalek, who served as the chief of the royal coin mints.

== Life as a poet ==
During his early twenties, Foroughi became acquainted with the court of Fath-Ali Shah Qajar (r. 1797–1834), most likely through the efforts of Dust-Ali Khan. Some years later, Fath-Ali Shah dispatched him to Mashhad to be part of the retinue of the Qajar prince Hasan Ali Mirza, who governed Khorasan. It was there that he started switched his pen name from "Meshkin" to "Foroughi" in appreciation for Hasan Ali Mirza's son Forough ol-Dowleh. Foroughi and the poet Qaani also formed a close friendship that lasted their lifetime.

== Death ==
In 1857, Foroughi died in Tehran.

== Sources ==
- Moayyad, Heshmat (2020). "Forūḡī Besṭāmī, ʿAbbās". Encyclopaedia Iranica Online. Brill. doi:10.1163/2330-4804_EIRO_COM_1690.
