= Teymanak-e Olya =

Village in Razavi Khorasan province, Iran

Teymanak-e Olya Persian: تيمنك عليا
- Village
- Location within Iran
- Coordinates: 35°30′13″N 60°35′37″E
- Country: Iran
- Province: Razavi Khorasan
- County: Torbat-e Jam
- District: Central
- Rural District: Jolgeh-ye Musaabad

Population (2016)
  - Total: 605
- Time zone: UTC+3:30 (IRST)

Teymanak-e Olya (Persian: تيمنك عليا) (Note: Also romanized as Teymanak ‘Olyā and Teymanak-e ‘Olyā; also known as Teymanak and Teymanak-e Bālā) is a village in Jolgeh-ye Musaabad Rural District of the Central District in Torbat-e Jam County, Razavi Khorasan province, Iran.

== Demographics ==
=== Population ===
At the time of the 2006 National Census, the village's population was 559 in 117 households. The following census in 2011 counted 627 people in 141 households. The 2016 census measured the population of the village as 605 people in 146 households.
