= Sheikh Ahmad-e Jami =

Iranian sufi and Persian poet

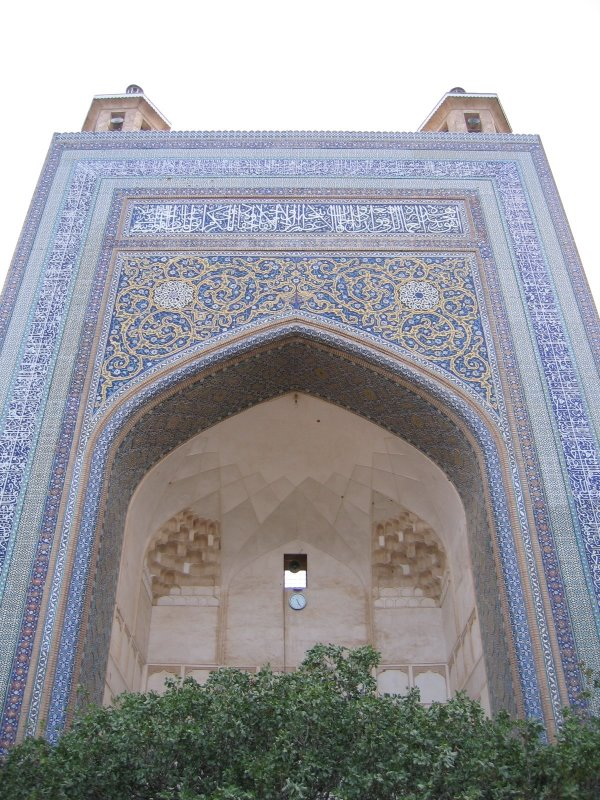
- Tomb of Sheikh Ahmad-e Jami in Torbat-e Jam, Iran
- Title: Sheikh al-Islam

Personal life
- Born: 1049 Namaq, Seljuk Empire
- Died: 1141 (aged 91–92) Torbat-e Jam, Seljuk Empire
- Resting place: Turbat-i Sheikh Jam
- Era: Islamic Golden Age

Religious life
- Religion: Islam
- Denomination: Sunni

Muslim leader
- Teacher: Abu Taher Kurd

Sehab al-Din Abu Nasr Ahmad ibn Abu'l Hasan ibn Ahmad ibn Muhammad Namaqi Jami (Persian: شهاب‌الدّین ابونصر احمد ابن ابوالحسن ابن احمد ابن محمد جامی نامقی; 1049 – 1141), better known as Sheikh Ahmad-e Jami (Persian: شیخ احمد جامی) or by his sobriquet Zinda-fil (Persian: ژنده‌پیل), was a Persian Sufi, writer, mystic and poet. A conservative Sufi, Ahmad preached and wrote extensively, with his work being notable for their focus on ordinary topics and use of conversational language. These formed an important contribution to Persian literature.

He grew increasingly revered after his death, with his tomb becoming a prominent religious shrine. His descendants, who were its custodians, became influential political figures over subsequent centuries.

== Life ==
Ahmad was born in Namaq, in the outskirts of Jam, in 1049. His family claimed descent from Jarir ibn Abd Allah al-Bajali, a companion of Muhammad, though Ahmad's appearance was distinctly non-Arab, and his Persian had a native sounding quality. His sobriquet Zinda-fil ("the colossal elephant" or "the terrible elephant") referred both to his appearance and his religio-social conduct.

Ahmad had some formal schooling in his youth. At age twenty-two, while "immersed in the pleasures of a loose life", he experienced a miracle, which led him to denounce worldy interests. He secluded himself in the mountains around Namaq, where he spent the next eighteen years devoted to study, meditation, and self-imposed hardships. At the age of forty, he left the solitary life and began a long career of preaching, teaching Sufi followers, and writing books. He travelled to many nearby villages and towns, including Herat and Nishapur, and at one point made Hajj.

Jam was his permanent residence, where he built a mosque and khanaqa. His contact was limited mostly to the local population and minor dignitaries, with the one notable exception of the Seljuk sultan Ahmad Sanjar, who had a particular liking to Ahmad and with whom he exchanged correspondence. Two such letters survive, one in which Ahmad defended Jam's population, and another where he answered a spiritual question from Sanjar.

Ahmad stands apart from any known Sufi order of his day. His pir was an otherwise unknown figure named Abu Taher Kurd. Subsequent hagiographers attempted to propagate a spiritual link between Ahmad and the celebrated Sufi, Abu Sa'id Abu'l-Khayr, though this has no basis in fact.

A stern conservative, Ahmad heavily cited hadith in his work Meftāh al Najāt to demonstrate the strictest orthodoxy. He is portrayed by his pupil and biographer, Sadid al-Din Gaznavi, as getting involved in people's affairs, destroying musical instruments and vats of wine, and punishing sinners and forcing them to repent. Historian Shivan Mahendrarajah describes Ahmad as "haughty, belligerent, vindictive, and miserly". Conversely, Heshmat Moayyad suggests that Gaznavi's descriptions are not borne out in the impression left by Ahmad's books, "where he appears gentle and ready to forgive a whole life of sin and corruption if only the last breath is taken in repentance".

Ahmad's writings rarely touched on sophisticated questions of philosophy or theology, instead focusing on ordinary subjects of Sufi practice and morality. He constantly warned against hypocrites and often repeated himself. He wrote in the style of sermons, and his language was clear and conversational, making liberal uses of parables and situational examples. Subsequent followers attributed him with wild miracles, though this is practically unsupported by Ahmad's own writings. He had also engaged in writing poetry, and a diwan (mostly ghazals) has been attributed to him under the pen name "Ahmad" or "Ahmadi". However, the authenticity of these is at least partially questionable.

Unlike other prominent mystics, Ahmad had minimal appeal with religious scholars and poets. Beatrice Forbes Manz notes that his works apparently had little impact. Moayyad considers that his writings were "more precious for their contribution to Persian literary history than for their teachings". However, in the years following Ahmad's death in 1141, he became an increasingly revered figure. (Note: A notable devotee was the 15th-century poet Jami, whose pen name was partially inspired by Ahmad.) His tomb, the Turbat-i Sheikh Jam, became a flourishing shrine, and a focus of royal and elite patronage in subsequent centuries.

== Descendants ==
Ahmad married eight wives and had fourteen sons that survived him, some of whom became notable religious figures in their own right. He married his offspring into notable families of the western Khorasan and Quhistan regions, settling them in the respective towns; this was a policy continued by his family throughout the subsequent Mongol period.

His descendants proliferated greatly over the following generations; by 1436, around one thousand were residing in Jam, Nishapur, Herat, and nearby areas. The family wielded enormous influence over both Tajiks and Mongols, stemming from their management of Ahmad's prestigious shrine, as well as through the possession of an ample agricultural base. Sheikh Qutb al-Din of Jam played a part in the election of the Ilkhan claimant Togha Temür in 1337. Mu'in al-Din Muhammad Jami served as vizier to the Kartid ruler Mu'izz al-Din, in addition to being the latter's nephew and son-in-law. Mu'in al-Din's uncle, the Mutawālī of the Jami shrine Radi al-Din, incited the Mongol noble Amir Qazaghan to invade Kartid territory. A generation later, the Jami sheikhs encouraged the campaigns of Timur in the same region.

Their influence in Iran waned with the advent of the Safavids, but found new opportunities in South Asia. Maham Begum and Hamida Banu Begum, the mothers of the Mughal emperors Humayun and Akbar respectively, were both of the Jami family. Many Jami sheikhs populated Akbar's court, though appear to have played a more literary role than wielding actual power.

In Iran, though the shrine of Ahmad received support under the Safavids, sectarian strife and the Persian–Uzbek wars caused leading Jamis to depart, joining kinsmen in Mughal India. Over the subsequent Afsharid, Qajar, Zand, and Pahlawi eras, the shrine fell into disrepair and its cult withered. However, upon the establishment of the Islamic Republic of Iran in 1979, in the interest of strengthening nationalist bonds with Sunni communities and institutions, the shrine and cult received significant financial and technical backing from the central government. As a result, these experienced a rejuvenation. In Jam, a number of mayors have since been appointed from among the Jamis, and both there and in Herat, the family remain influential and respected into the present-day.

== Works ==
Although the titles of his books were in Arabic, all of them are written in Persian. They were regarding shariah and theology, with some of his most important books being:

- Meftāh al Najāt (Arabic: مفتاح النجاة) – "The key of Redemption"
- Konuz al Hekma (Arabic: کنوز الحکمة) – "The Treasure of Wisdom"
- Seraj al Sāerin (Arabic: سراج السائرین) – "The Lamp of Pilgrims"

== See also ==
- Torbat-e Jam
- Sufism

== Sources ==
- Baldick, Julian (2016). George Morrison (ed.). "Medieval Sufi Literature in Persian Prose". Iranian Studies: Volume 2: History of Persian Literature from the Beginning of the Islamic Period to the Present Day. BRILL. ISBN 978-90-04-30500-7.
- Jackson, Peter (2023). From Genghis Khan to Tamerlane: The Reawakening of Mongol Asia. Yale University Press. ISBN 978-0-300-27504-9.
- Mahendrarajah, Shivan (2021). The Saint of Jam: History, Religion, and Politics of a Sunni Shrine in Shi'i Iran. Cambridge University Press. ISBN 978-1-108-83969-3.
- Manz, Beatrice Forbes (2007). Power, Politics and Religion in Timurid Iran. Cambridge University Press. ISBN 978-1-139-46284-6.
- Moayyad, Heshmat (1984). "AḤMAD-E JĀM". Encyclopaedia Iranica. Encyclopaedia Iranica Foundation.
- Solati, Bahman (2015). Persian Words of Wisdom: Sayings and Proverbs by Masters of Persian Poetry. Universal-Publishers. ISBN 978-1-62734-054-0.
