= Mahmudabad-e Olya, Razavi Khorasan =

Village in Razavi Khorasan province, Iran

Mahmudabad-e Olya Persian: محمودابادعليا
- Village
- Location within Iran
- Coordinates: 35°24′32″N 60°28′04″E
- Country: Iran
- Province: Razavi Khorasan
- County: Torbat-e Jam
- District: Central
- Rural District: Miyan Jam

Population (2016)
  - Total: 1,354
- Time zone: UTC+3:30 (IRST)

Mahmudabad-e Olya (Persian: محمودابادعليا) (Note: Also romanized as Maḩmūdābād-e ‘Olyā; also known as Maḩmūdābād, Maḩmūdābād Bālā, Maḩmūdābād-e Bālā, and Mohammad Ābād) is a village in Miyan Jam Rural District of the Central District in Torbat-e Jam County, Razavi Khorasan province, Iran.

== Demographics ==
=== Population ===
At the time of the 2006 National Census, the village's population was 1,102 in 246 households. The following census in 2011 counted 1,215 people in 305 households. The 2016 census measured the population of the village as 1,354 people in 367 households.
