= Chah Mazar-e Olya =

Chah Mazar-e Olya چاه مزارعليا
- Village
- Location within Iran
- Coordinates: 35°40′52″N 60°36′31″E
- Country: Iran
- Province: Razavi Khorasan
- County: Torbat-e Jam
- Bakhsh: Central
- Rural District: Jolgeh-ye Musaabad

Population (2006)
  - Total: 368
- Time zone: UTC+3:30 (IRST)
  - Summer (DST): UTC+4:30 (IRDT)

Chah Mazar-e Olya (Persian: چاه مزارعليا, also Romanized as Chāh Mazār-e ‘Olyā; also known as Chāh Mazār-e Bālā, Chāh Mīrzā, and Chāh Mīrzā Bālā) is a village in Jolgeh-ye Musaabad Rural District, in the Central District of Torbat-e Jam County, Razavi Khorasan Province, Iran. At the 2006 census, its population was 368, in 82 families.
