= Kashaneh Tower =

Tower in Iran

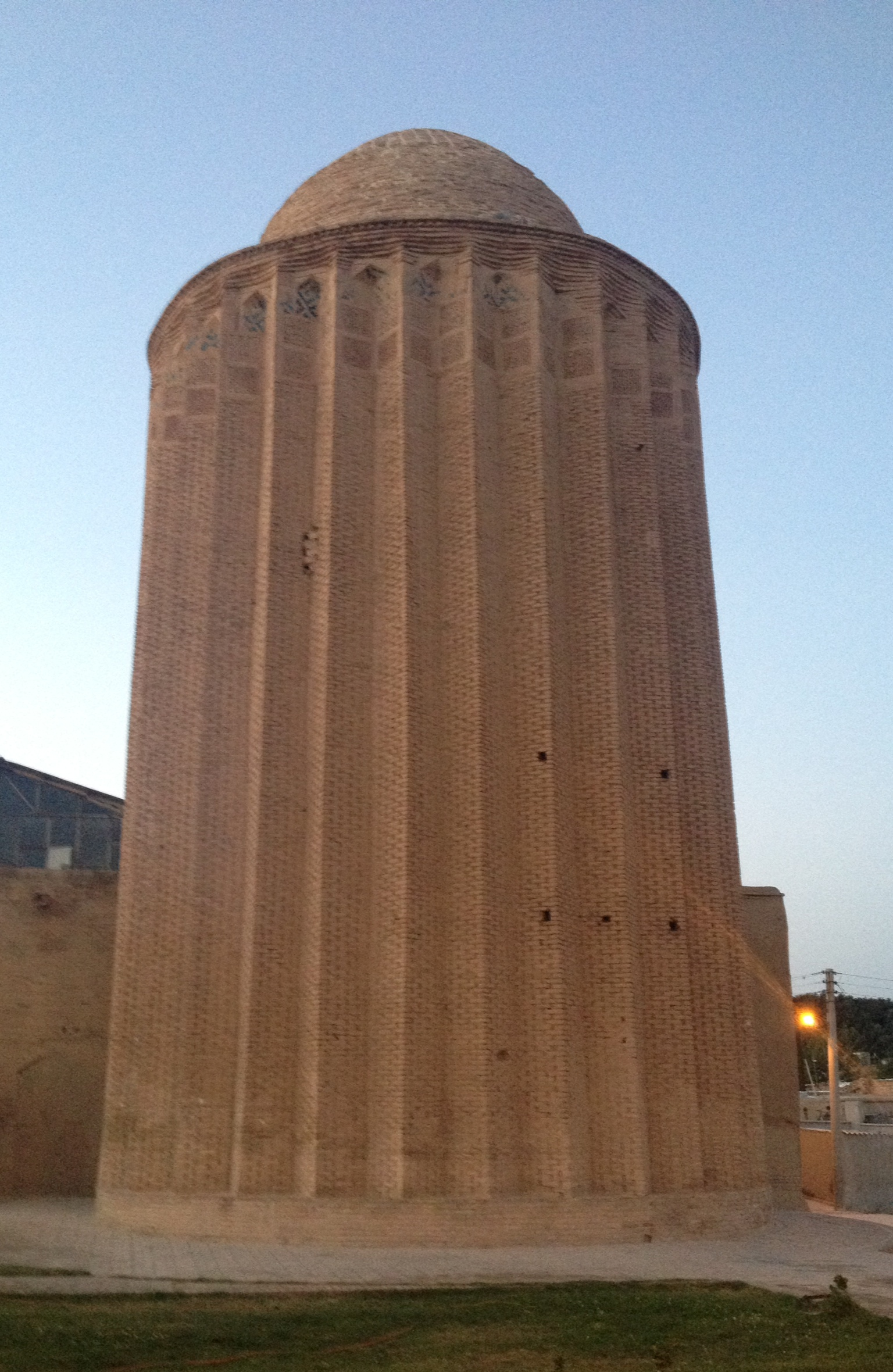

- Location within Iran
- 36°28′59″N 55°00′00″E

Iran National Heritage List
- Official name: Kashaneh Tower
- Type: Funerary Tower
- Designated: 1932
- Reference no.: 69
- Conservation organization: Cultural Heritage, Handicrafts and Tourism Organization of Iran

The Kashaneh Tower (Persian: برج کاشانه) is a 14th-century structure in Bastam, Iran. It is located to the south east of the Jama mosque of Bastam.

== History ==
The inscription on top of the entrance of the tower attributes the building to the year 700 of the lunar Hijri calendar. The local people however believe that the tower has been a Zoroastrian fire temple during Sassanian times. André Godard however, attributes the building to Ghazan khan, which is in agreement with the inscription on the building indicating its date of construction. Furthermore, André Godard claims that the structure was originally named Ghazaneh which was later corrupted into Kashaneh. The inscription on top of the building however, attributes it to Öljaitü.

At times, it was used as a watchtower. However, the tower's shape suggests that it might have had uses in astronomy, as it resembles an observatory in many ways.

The tower's roof had at one point collapsed but was later repaired.

It was enlisted among the national heritage sites of Iran with the registration number 69 on 6 January 1932.

== Architecture ==
The tower is 24 meters tall from the inside, and 20 meters tall from outside. It's external shape is a Triacontagon. On top of the tower there are two outlines made of large bricks that have inscriptions on them.

== Gallery ==
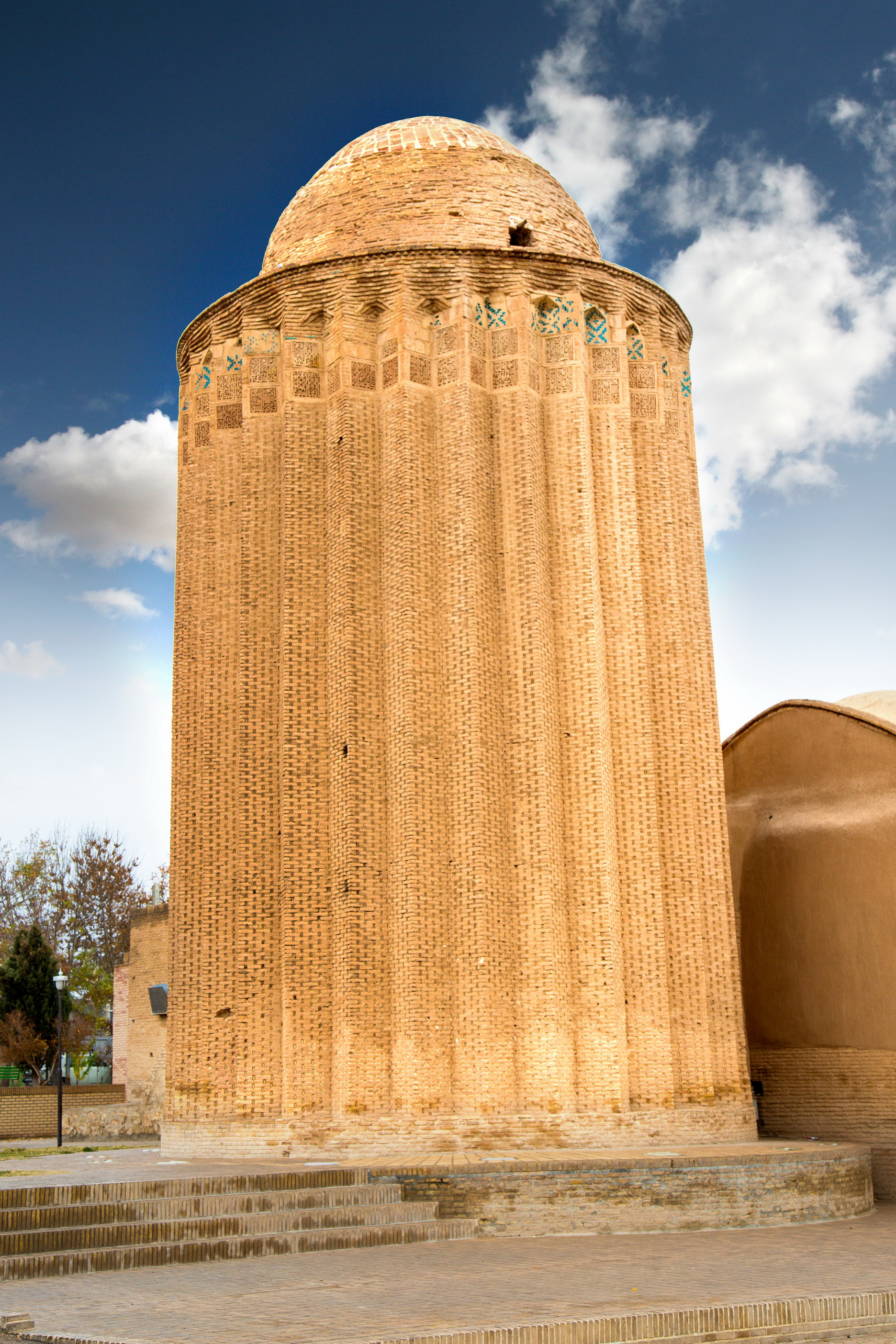

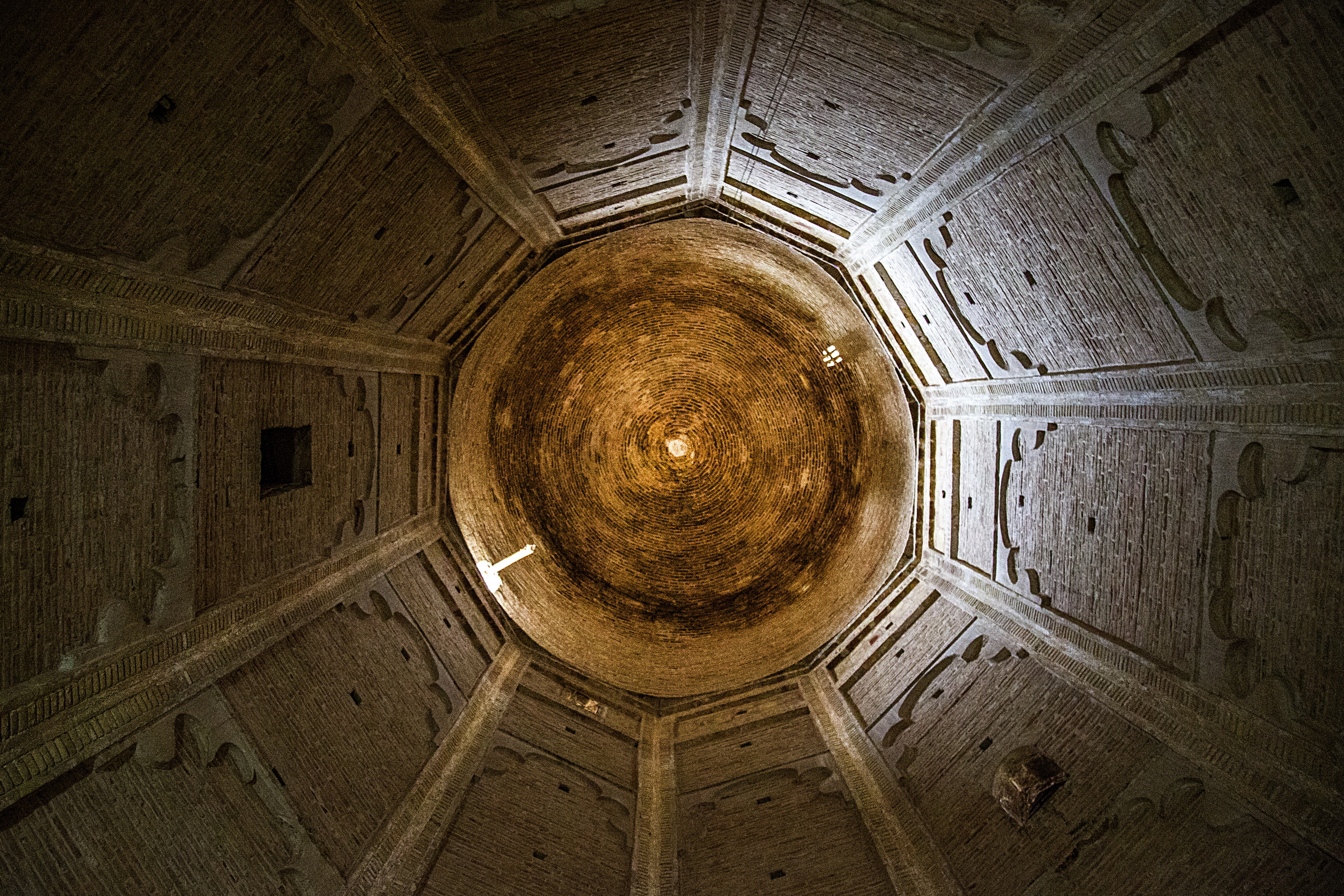

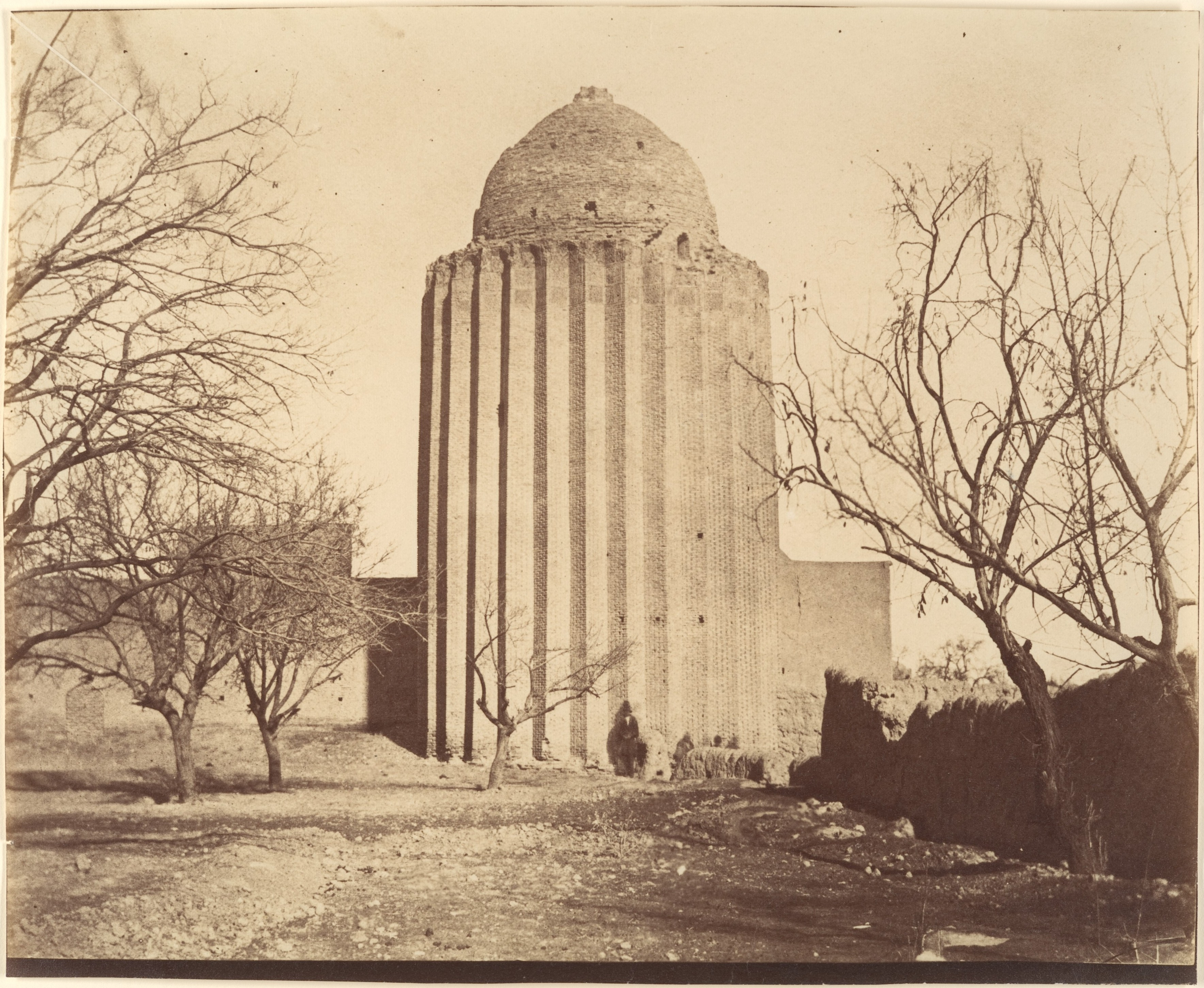

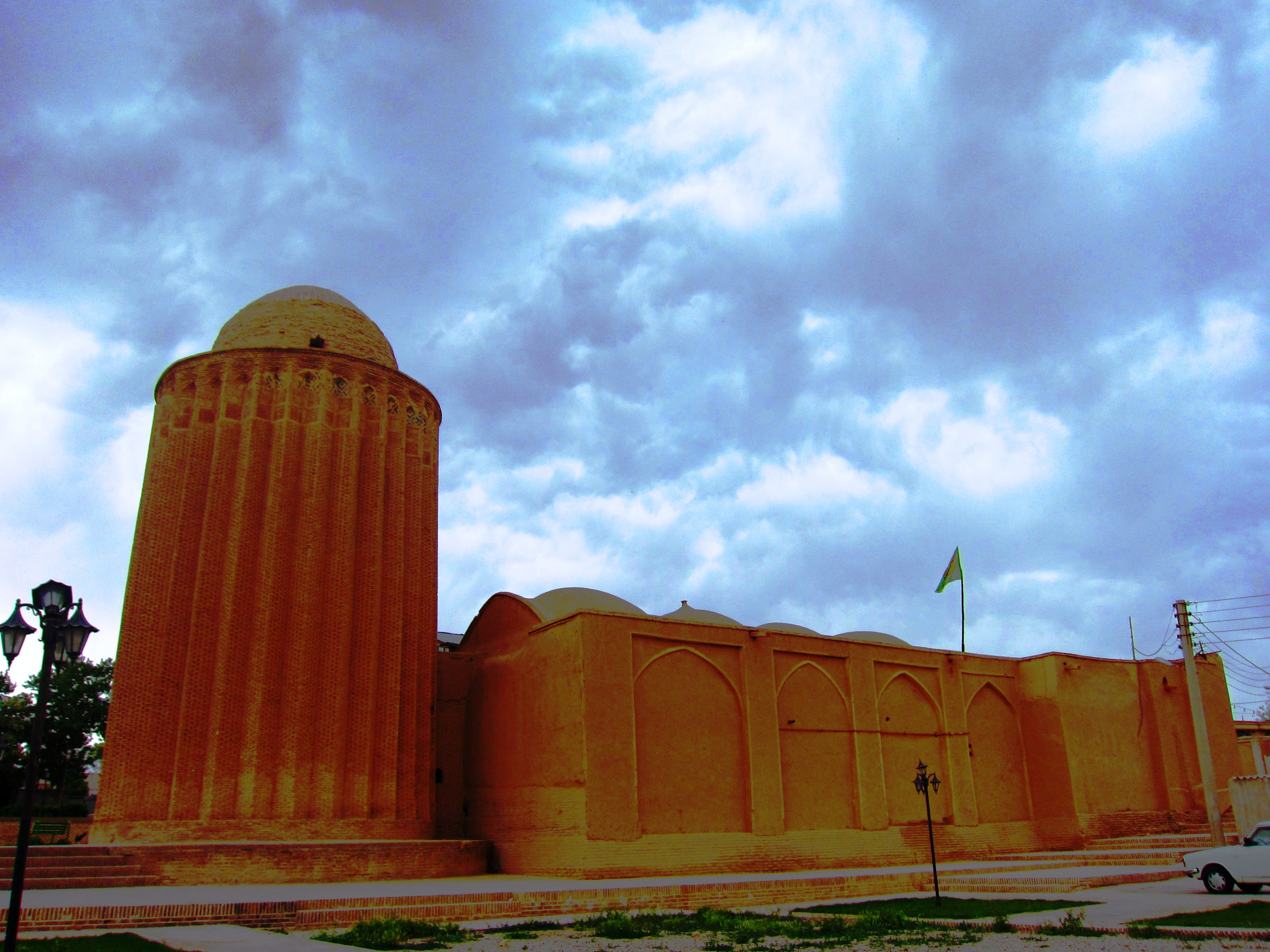
