= Bagh Sangan-e Olya =

Village in Razavi Khorasan province, Iran

Bagh Sangan-e Olya Persian: باغ سنگان عليا
- Village
- Location within Iran
- Coordinates: 35°18′32″N 60°33′16″E
- Country: Iran
- Province: Razavi Khorasan
- County: Torbat-e Jam
- District: Central
- Rural District: Miyan Jam

Population (2016)
  - Total: 1,099
- Time zone: UTC+3:30 (IRST)

Bagh Sangan-e Olya (Persian: باغ سنگان عليا) (Note: Also romanized as Bāgh Sangān-e ‘Olyā; also known as Bāgh Sangān, Bāgh-e Sangān, Bāgh-e Sangān-e Bālā, Bāgh-i-Sangūn, and Dāq Sangān) is a village in Miyan Jam Rural District of the Central District in Torbat-e Jam County, Razavi Khorasan province, Iran.

== Demographics ==
=== Population ===
At the time of the 2006 National Census, the village's population was 753 in 175 households. The following census in 2011 counted 907 people in 228 households. The 2016 census measured the population of the village as 1,099 people in 300 households.
