= Toq Qoz-e Sofla =

Village in Razavi Khorasan province, Iran

Toq Qoz-e Sofla Persian: تق قزسفلي
- Village
- Location within Iran
- Coordinates: 35°20′27″N 60°49′24″E
- Country: Iran
- Province: Razavi Khorasan
- County: Torbat-e Jam
- District: Central
- Rural District: Jamrud

Population (2016)
  - Total: 443
- Time zone: UTC+3:30 (IRST)

Toq Qoz-e Sofla (Persian: تق قزسفلي) (Note: Also romanized as Toq Qoz-e Soflá; also known as Toqoz-e Sofla, Toqoz-e Soflá, and Tūqoz-e Pā’īn) is a village in Jamrud Rural District of the Central District in Torbat-e Jam County, Razavi Khorasan province, Iran.

== Demographics ==
=== Population ===
At the time of the 2006 National Census, the village's population was 336 in 65 households. The following census in 2011 counted 362 people in 82 households. The 2016 census measured the population of the village as 443 people in 107 households.
