= Bastam =

City in Semnan province, Iran

Bastam Persian: بسطام
- City
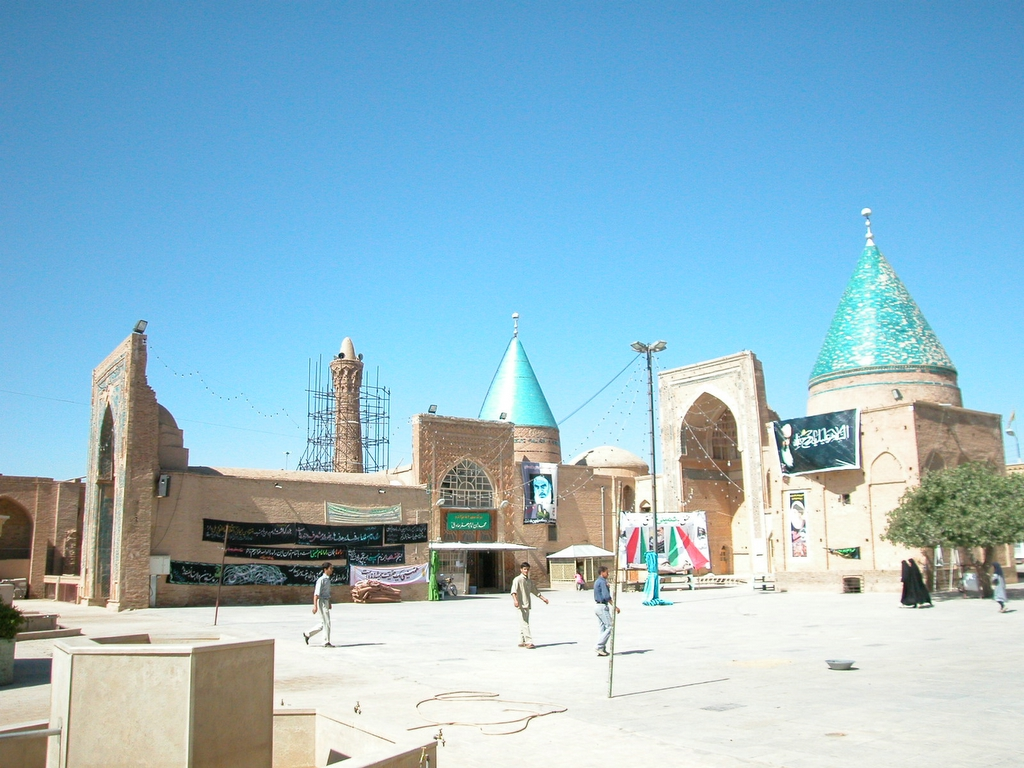
- Bayazid Shrine Complex

- Location within Iran
- Coordinates: 36°29′05″N 55°00′00″E
- Country: Iran
- Province: Semnan
- County: Shahrud
- District: Bastam District
- Elevation: 1,450 m (4,760 ft)

Population (2016)
  - Total: 8,609
- Time zone: UTC+3:30 (IRST)
- Area code: 0233252
- Website: www.bastam.ir

Bastam (Persian: بسطام) (Note: Also romanized as Basṭām; also known as Bisṭām and Busṭām) is a city in, and the capital of, Bastam District in Shahrud County, Semnan province, Iran.

== History ==
Bastam was founded in the 6th century in the Greater Khorasan. It is 6 kilometres (3.7 mi) north of Shahrud. The town is known for its Islamic monuments from the Ilkhanid period and its association with the mystic Bayazid Bastami. The Alborz are to the north of the town.

The 19th-century poet, Abbas Foroughi Bastami, lived in Bastam for a time and thence acquired its name as his own. The early Bábí leader and martyr Mullá ʻAlíy-i-Bastámí was also raised in Bastam, and was a significant figure in the Shaykhi movement and later became the first person known to have died for their allegiance to Bábism.

A tradition says that the town was founded by Vistahm, uncle of the Sasanian king Khosrau II.

The historical town of Bastam embraces the holy shrine of Mohammad Ibn Jafar Sadegh (AS), Bayazid Bastami tomb, Bayazid Monastery, Bayazid Mosque, Eljaito Iwan, Ghazan Dome, Jame Mosque, Kashaneh Tower, and Shahrokhieh School, which were built in different eras from Seljuk era (1037–1194) to Qajar period (1789–1925).

== Demographics ==
=== Population ===
At the time of the 2006 National Census, the city's population was 7,382 in 1,997 households. The following census in 2011 counted 8,609 people in 2,713 households. The 2016 census measured the population of the city as 8,609 people in 2,713 households.

== See also ==
- Great Khorasan Road
