= Bezd =

Village in Razavi Khorasan province, Iran

Bezd Persian: بزد
- Village
- Location within Iran
- Coordinates: 35°12′38″N 60°26′32″E
- Country: Iran
- Province: Razavi Khorasan
- County: Torbat-e Jam
- District: Central
- Rural District: Miyan Jam

Population (2016)
  - Total: 2,716
- Time zone: UTC+3:30 (IRST)

Bezd (Persian: بزد) (Note: Also known as Bezg and Bīzak) is a village in Miyan Jam Rural District of the Central District in Torbat-e Jam County, Razavi Khorasan province, Iran.

== Demographics ==
=== Population ===
At the time of the 2006 National Census, the village's population was 2,821 in 663 households. The following census in 2011 counted 2,959 people in 759 households. The 2016 census measured the population of the village as 2,716 people in 753 households, the most populous in its rural district.
