= Toq Qoz-e Olya =

Village in Razavi Khorasan province, Iran

Toq Qoz-e Olya Persian: تق قزعليا
- Village
- Location within Iran
- Coordinates: 35°21′06″N 60°49′57″E
- Country: Iran
- Province: Razavi Khorasan
- County: Torbat-e Jam
- District: Central
- Rural District: Jamrud

Population (2016)
  - Total: 492
- Time zone: UTC+3:30 (IRST)

Toq Qoz-e Olya (Persian: تق قزعليا) (Note: Also romanized as Toq Qoz-e ‘Olyā; also known as Toqoz-e Olya, Toqoz-e ‘Olyā, and Tūqoz-e Bālā) is a village in Jamrud Rural District of the Central District in Torbat-e Jam County, Razavi Khorasan province, Iran.

== Demographics ==
=== Population ===
At the time of the 2006 National Census, the village's population was 398 in 87 households. The following census in 2011 counted 376 people in 98 households. The 2016 census measured the population of the village as 492 people in 126 households.
