= Teymanak-e Sofla =

Village in Razavi Khorasan province, Iran

Teymanak-e Sofla Persian: تيمنك سفلي
- Village
- Location within Iran
- Coordinates: 35°29′02″N 60°36′02″E
- Country: Iran
- Province: Razavi Khorasan
- County: Torbat-e Jam
- District: Central
- Rural District: Jolgeh-ye Musaabad

Population (2016)
  - Total: 1,451
- Time zone: UTC+3:30 (IRST)

Teymanak-e Sofla (Persian: تيمنك سفلي) (Note: Also romanized as Teymanak-e Soflá; also known as Teymanak-e Pā’īn) is a village in Jolgeh-ye Musaabad Rural District of the Central District in Torbat-e Jam County, Razavi Khorasan province, Iran.

== Demographics ==
=== Population ===
At the time of the 2006 National Census, the village's population was 1,074 in 241 households. The following census in 2011 counted 1,360 people in 385 households. The 2016 census measured the population of the village as 1,451 people in 381 households, the most populous in its rural district.
