= Buteh Gaz, Mashhad =

Buteh Gaz بوته گز
- Village
- Location within Iran
- Coordinates: 35°52′26″N 60°19′44″E
- Country: Iran
- Province: Razavi Khorasan
- County: Mashhad
- Bakhsh: Razaviyeh
- Rural District: Pain Velayat

Population (2006)
  - Total: 78
- Time zone: UTC+3:30 (IRST)
  - Summer (DST): UTC+4:30 (IRDT)

Buteh Gaz (Persian: بوته گز, also Romanized as Būteh Gaz; also known as Botteh Gaz, Būta Gaz, and Būteh Kār) is a village in Pain Velayat Rural District, Razaviyeh District, Mashhad County, Razavi Khorasan Province, Iran. At the 2006 census, its population was 78, in 22 families.
