= Qaleh Sorkh, Kermanshah =

Qaleh Sorkh قلعه سرخ
- Village
- Location within Iran
- Coordinates: 33°53′54″N 47°02′40″E
- Country: Iran
- Province: Kermanshah
- County: Kermanshah
- Bakhsh: Firuzabad
- Rural District: Jalalvand

Population (2006)
  - Total: 62
- Time zone: UTC+3:30 (IRST)
  - Summer (DST): UTC+4:30 (IRDT)

Qaleh Sorkh (Persian: قلعه سرخ, also Romanized as Qal‘eh Sorkh) is a village in Jalalvand Rural District, Firuzabad District, Kermanshah County, Kermanshah Province, Iran. At the 2006 census, its population was 62, in 12 families.
