= Ali Mohammad Moadab =

Iranian poet (born 1977)

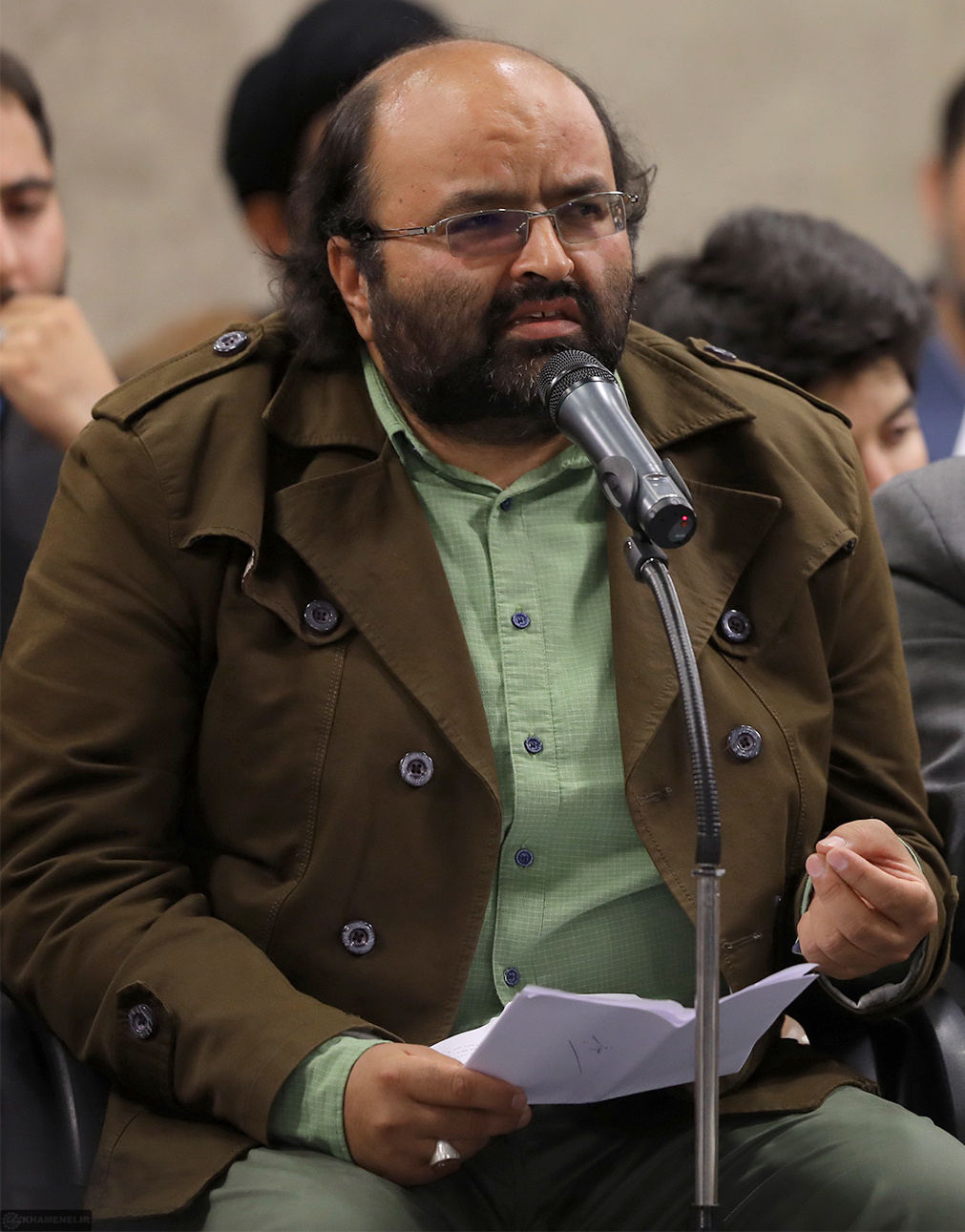
- Ali Mohammad Moaddab in a Meeting attended by Poets and people of culture and literature with Ali Khamenei-June 2017
- Born: March 10, 1977; Torbat Jam, Iran
- Occupations: Poet, and writer
- Writing career
- Period: 2000–
- Notable works: Love poetries on Noah's son Mourning at Protestants' Tekieh
- Literary movement: Modern literature
- Website: moaddab.com

Ali Mohammad Moadab (Persian: علی‌محمد مؤدب) (born March 10, 1977, in Torbat Jam) is an Iranian poet. Nominated and winner of some Persian poetry awards, he has been considered one of the distinguished poets of post-Revolution Iranian poetry.

== Biography ==
Ali Mohammad Moadab was born in Taghi Abad in Torbat Jam, a city in Khorasan Province, Iran. He graduated in Theology from Imam Sadiq University.

Moaddab's debut work Love poetry by Noah's son, was a collection of Persian poetry. In 2013, he published Galaxy of Faces which has been shortlisted for annual Iran's Book of the Year Awards.

== Awards and nominations ==
- 2013 – Iran's Book of the Year Awards (Nominated)

== Bibliography ==
Year	English title	Persian	Pages	Notes
2003	Love poetry by Noah's son	Ašeghāne-hāy-e Pesar-e Nūh		
2004	That's What I Knew of the War	Hamīn Ghadr Mīfahmīdam az Jang	–	
2005	Professional deads	Morde-hāy-e Herfe'ī		-
2007	Wrong Alephs	Alef-hāy-e Ghalat	–	
2008	No Perfume of any Flower	Atr-e Hich Golī Nīst		
2009	Mourning at Protestants' Tekieh	Roaze Dar Tekyey-e Protestān-hā	–	
2009	Lies of	Dorūgh-hāy-e	–	
2012	Galaxy of Faces	Kahkešān-e Chehrehā –		
2014	Book of Bombing	Sefr-e Bombārān	–	–

== See also ==
- Qeysar Aminpour
- Hossein Monzavi
