= Sheikh Ahmad-e Jami Mausoleum =

Heritage site in Khorasan, Iran

- مجموعهٔ آرامگاهی شیخ احمد جامی
- The iwan of the mausoleum

- Location of the mausoleum in Iran

Religion
- Affiliation: Sunni Islam
- Rite: Sufism
- Ecclesiastical or organisational status: Mausoleum and shrine
- Status: Active

Location
- Location: Torbat-e Jam, Razavi Khorasan province
- Country: Iran
- Coordinates: 35°14′50″N 60°37′46″E

Architecture
- Type: Islamic architecture
- Style: Seljuk
- Completed: 1236 CE (dome)

Specifications
- Dome: One (maybe more)
- Shrine: One: Sheikh Ahmad-e Jami
- Materials: Bricks; mortar

Iran National Heritage List
- Official name: Mausoleum of Sheikh Ahmad Jami
- Type: Mausoleum
- Designated: 1932
- Reference no.: 174
- Conservation organization: Cultural Heritage, Handicrafts and Tourism Organization of Iran

The Sheikh Ahmad-e Jami Mausoleum (Persian: مجموعهٔ آرامگاهی شیخ احمد جامی; Arabic: ضريح الشيخ أحمد جامي), also known as the Tomb of Ahmad-e Jam and as the Turbat-i Shaykh Jam, is a Sunni mausoleum and shrine complex located in Torbat-e Jam, in the province of Razavi Khorasan, Iran. The complex includes a collection of religious buildings, mosques, houses and tombstones all around the central tomb of Sheikh Ahmad-e Jami, an Iranian sufi who lived between 1048 and 1141.

The mausoleum was added to the Iran National Heritage List on 6 January 1932 and is administered by the Cultural Heritage, Handicrafts and Tourism Organization of Iran.

== History ==
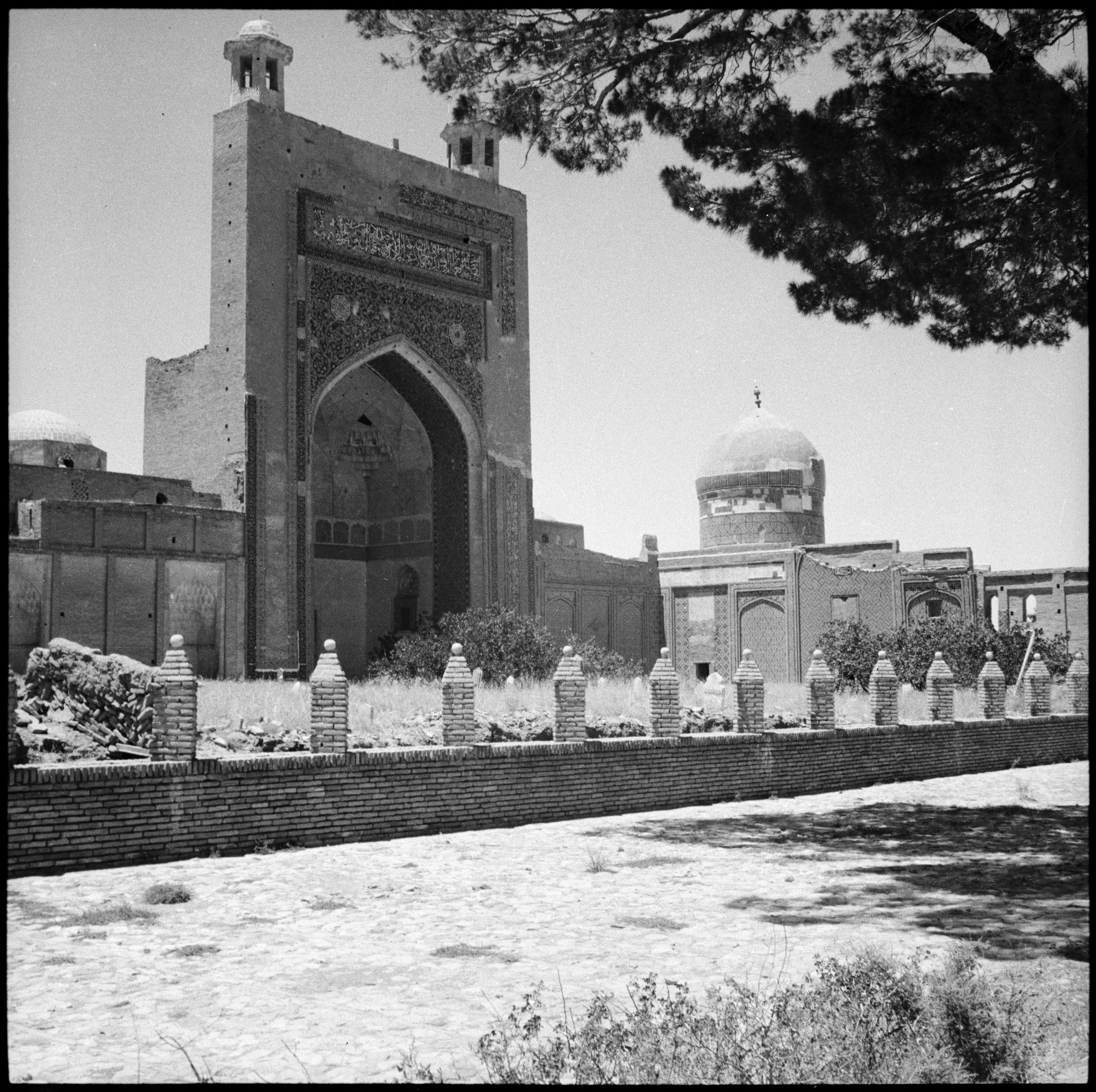
Photograph of the mausoleum by Annemarie Schwarzenbach, 1939/40

The shrine complex of Turbat-i Shaykh Ahmad-i Jam is located in the Khorasan province on the eastern Iranian plateau. It commemorates Sheikh Ahmad-i Jami (Ahmad ibn Abu'l Hasan), a Sufi theologian and poet who spent most of his life in the small town of Buzajan (or Puchkan), which was renamed Turbat-i Jam (Tomb of Jam) after his death in 536 AH (1141/1142 CE).

The shrine that gradually developed around the Sheikh's grave was the main pilgrimage destination in the eastern Iran until the sixteenth century when Shi'ism prevailed under the Safavid dynasty. Lisa Golombek, an art historian, has identified ten structures on the site that were built in eight different phases beginning in the early thirteenth century.

The shrine complex was renovated with private and public funds from Iran's Cultural Heritage Organization. As a shrine for a Sunni Sufi cult, the shrine-complex started sliding into decline when Iran's Shahs took the Shiʿi path in 1501, but has subsequently been renovated. Two madrasas, that teach Sunni curricula to males and females, were added to the complex.

== Architecture ==
The shrine complex is oriented with qibla along the northeast–southwest axis. A single gateway facing northeast gives access to the sahn, which is enveloped by halls of different sizes to the northwest and southwest. The core of the complex is the grand gunbad located to the southwest of the Sheikh's uncovered grave. It was built in 1236 CE by a descendant of Seljuk Sultan Sanjar identified by Golombek as Kartid forebearer Rukn al-Din Abu Bakr.

In the early 14th century, a descendant of the Sheikh, named Shihab al-Din Ismail, built the Saracha Khanqah to the northwest of the Dome Chamber, while his son, Mutahhir b. Ismail, began the construction of a grand iwan for the chamber. Vizier Khwaja Muhammad Fariwandi contributed by building a madrasa near the khanqah. A son of Mutahhir b. Ismail named Khwaja Razi al-din Ahmad built a large arcaded mosque (Old Mosque) to the southeast of the Dome Chamber between 1320 and 1333. His other son, Ghiyath al-din Muhammad completed work on the grand iwan in 1362-1363 and added two small mosques to its southeast (Masjid-i Kermani) and northwest (Masjid-i Riwaq or Gunbad-i Safid). The northwest wing of the shrine, which contained a madrasa and its mosque (Gunbad-i Sabz), was built in 1440–1441 by Timurid Amir Jalal al-din Firuzshah. Firuzshah also erected the large courtyard mosque (New Mosque) that abuts the qibla wall of the Dome Chamber. Timurid Amir Shah Malik enclosed the shrine courtyard with a madrasa built across from the Firuzshah Madrasa two years later. Only Gunbad-i Sabz and a vestibule of the Firuzshah Madrasa remain of the Timurid construction today. Only the Dome Chamber, the grand iwan, the Kirmani and Riwaq Mosques and a section of the Old Mosque remain from the earlier compound.

Entrance to the mausoleum is through a wooden door decorated in Kufic script. The mausoleum complex is over 800 years old.

=== Dome Chamber ===
The Dome Chamber (or gunbad) is dated from 1236 CE and lies in the heart of the complex. It measures 10 metres (33 ft) per side and is crowned with a star-ribbed dome carried on muqarnas squinches. The interior walls are animated with shallow arched niches and covered entirely with painted geometric and floral motifs from the early 14th century. The painted foundation inscription envelops the walls below the squinches and contains the date of construction. Doorways centered on the northeast, southeast and northwest walls lead into the grand iwan, Old Mosque and Saracha Khanqah, respectively. The doorway on the qibla wall, which leads into the New Mosque, bears traces of plaster molding suggesting that it was a mihrab. Three of the doors feature carved woodwork from the fourteenth century.

=== The Grand Iwan ===
The construction of the grand iwan, which rises 33 metres (108 ft) high, next to the Sheikh's uncovered tomb, was initiated by Mutahhir b. Ismail in the early 14th century. It was completed in 1362–1363 by his son Ghiyath al-Din Muhammad under Kart Malik Abu'l Husain Muhammad. (1332–1370). A tile inscription commemorates the patronage of Safavid Shah Abbas I (1587–1629), who ordered the redecoration of the pishtaq with tiles in 1613–1614. The portal screen and the soffit of the iwan arch are covered entirely with the recently restored Safavid tiles. A wide band of Arabic inscription, composed in white script on a dark blue background, frames the pishtaq. Its white-plastered interior is unadorned except for the muqarnas squinches supporting its ribbed semi-vault. Doorways on the side walls of the iwan lead into the Kermani and Riwaq Mosques. The pishtaq is crowned with two miniature turrets whose stairs are no longer accessible.

=== Saracha Khanqah and Fariwandi Madrasa ===
Saracha Khanqah and Fariwandi Madrasa were built in the early 14th century to the northwest of the Dome Chamber. The patron of the khanqah was Shihab al-din Ismail (d. 1337–1338), a third generation descendent of the Sheikh. The madrasa was built by vizier Khwaja 'Ala al-Din Muhammad Fariwandi (d. 1337–1338). It is not certain whether the courtyard building that stands in their place today incorporates any segments of the earlier structures.

=== The Old Mosque ===
The Old Mosque (Masjid-i Atiq or Atigh) was built between 1320 and 1333 to the southeast of the Dome Chamber, was largely destroyed by the early twentieth century. Its plan, as reconstructed by Golombek, was a rectangle measuring 19 by 25.5 metres (62 by 84 ft), five aisles wide and two and a half rows deep. The transverse tunnel vaults of the nave (central aisle) and groin vaults of the transept (central row) defined a tall, cross-shaped volume flanked by double-story open arcades. A tall dome on squinches marked the intersection of the nave and transept. Photographs published by Ernst Diez in 1918 show carved stucco inscriptions framing the nave arcades and floral stucco carvings and painted arabesques in the arch soffits. Traces of tile mosaics were found in the mihrab area.

=== Kirmani Mosque and Gunbad-i Safid ===
Kirmani Mosque is named after Khwaja Masoud Kirmani, the artisan of its stucco mihrab who was later buried inside the mosque. The smaller Gunbad-i Safid was named after its white dome and is known today as the Riwaq, or Arcade Mosque. They were built in 1362–1363 by Ghiyath al-din Muhammad and are entered primarily through the grand iwan. Kirmani Mosque is a single domed chamber with a cross-shaped plan elongated on the northwest–southeast axis. Its seventeen-meter length is spanned with five transverse archways supporting four vaults and a tall central dome. Muqarnas semi-vaults crown the four deep niches. The plastered interior of the mosque is decorated simply with shallow niches, and is enveloped by a Quranic inscription below the springing of the arches. Its mihrab niche, by contrast, is set in a stucco frame with intricate multi-level carvings of floral motifs and inscriptions. A doorway to the right of the mihrab leads from the Kirmani Mosque into the Old Mosque. The smaller cross-shaped chamber of the Gunbad-i Safid is covered with a single dome that rests on the four archways of its niches. The niche semi-vaults are covered with plaster muqarnas similar those at the Kirmani Mosque. Gunbad-i Safid is linked to the courtyard of the Saracha Khanqah with a door on its qibla wall.

=== Firuzshah Madrasa and Gunbad-i Sabz ===
Firuzshah Madrasa and its mosque known today as Gunbad-i Sabz (Green Dome) were built in 1440–1441 by Timurid Amir Jalal al-din Firuzshah (d.1444-5). The construction may have been unfinished; only the mosque and a vestibule remain of the madrasa today. Golombek suggests that ensemble measured 15 by 19 metres (49 by 62 ft) with a central courtyard and was entered from the vestibule to the northeast of the mosque. The mosque and vestibule flank the northwest side of the shrine courtyard, which integrates the portal and façade of the former madrasa featuring tiled brickwork. The portal leads into the vestibule, a rectangular room with a simple mihrab. Entered separately from the shrine courtyard, the mosque is a cross-shaped chamber with four deep niches. It is covered by an elaborate squinch-net vault centered on a sixteen-ribbed dome about 6 metres (20 ft) in diameter. The outer dome, which is covered with turquoise tiles, is raised on a circular drum with a tile inscriptive band.

=== New Mosque ===
Timurid Amir Jalal al-din Firuzshah built the New Mosque in 1442-43 abutting the qibla walls of the Saracha Khanqah, Dome Chamber and Old Mosque. Its rectangular courtyard was originally flanked by arcades on all sides; the double-bay side arcades have not survived and are replaced by brick walls today. The single-bay northeast arcade has survived; it contains a door into the Dome Chamber and leads into the qibla row of the Old Mosque at one end. The prayer hall is located to the southeast of the courtyard. It is ten bays deep and four bays wide, with a cross-shaped sanctuary at its center. A tall portal centered on the courtyard facade opens into the sanctuary, which is crowned with a squinch-net vault identical to that of Gunbad-i Sabz. Its plastered interior and mihrab niche are decorated simply with black lines and yellow bands. The sanctuary has eight doors leading into the flanking halls.

=== Madrasa of Amir Shah Malik ===
"Magamat-i Ahmad-i Jam," mentions the construction of a madrasa by Timurid Amir Shah Malik to the southeast of the shrine courtyard. There are no traces of this madrasa, whose site is occupied by a modern structure housing the shrine's offices.

== Gallery ==
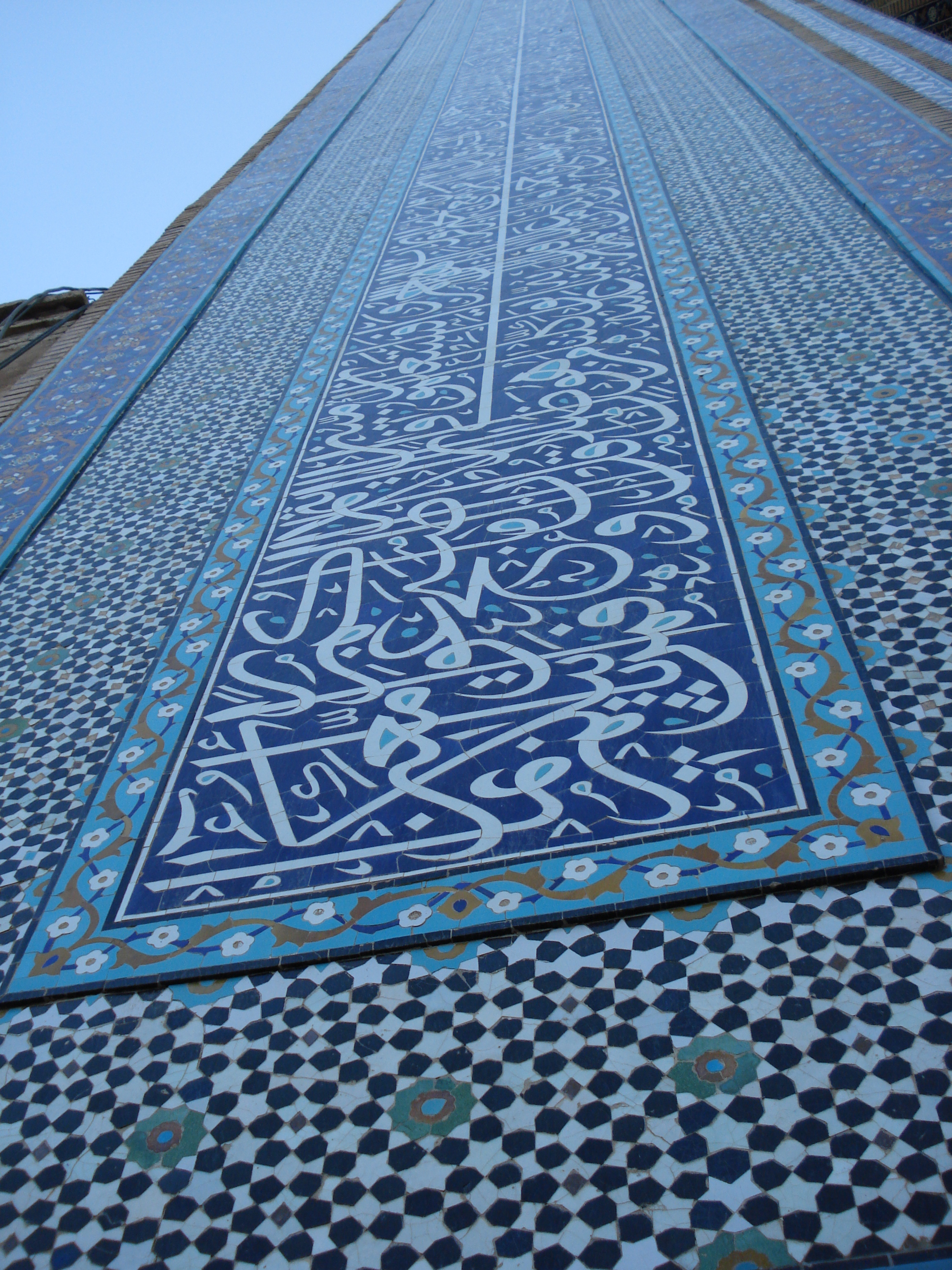
Detail of the left wall of the iwan with Islamic calligraphy of Al-Mulk, 67th chapter (sura) of the Quran

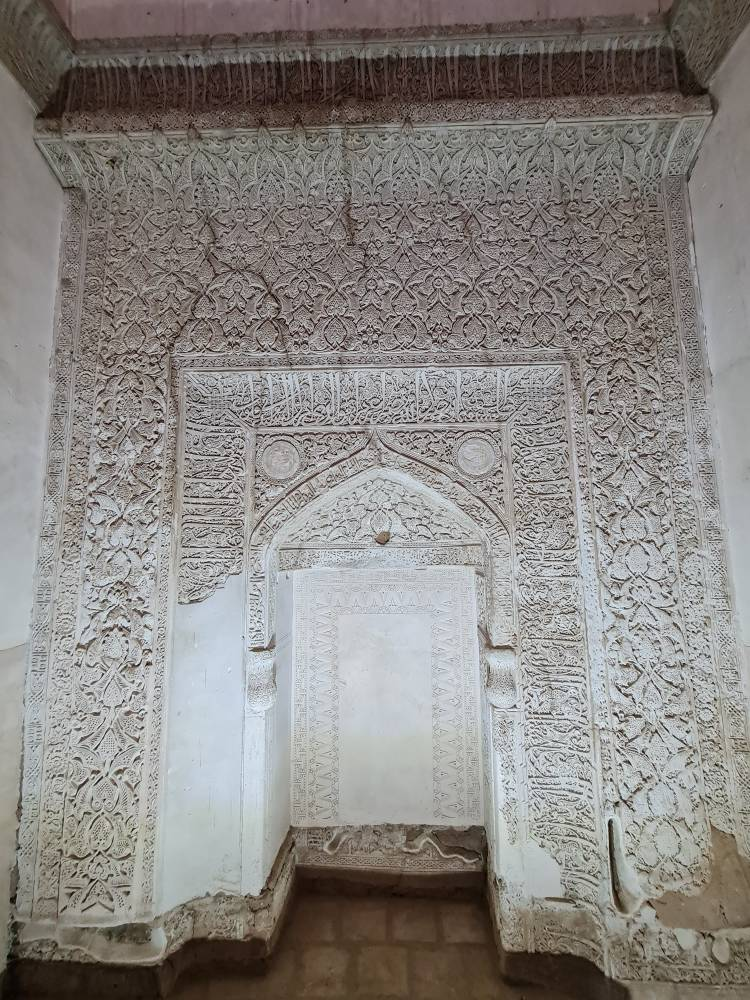
Interior of the iwan

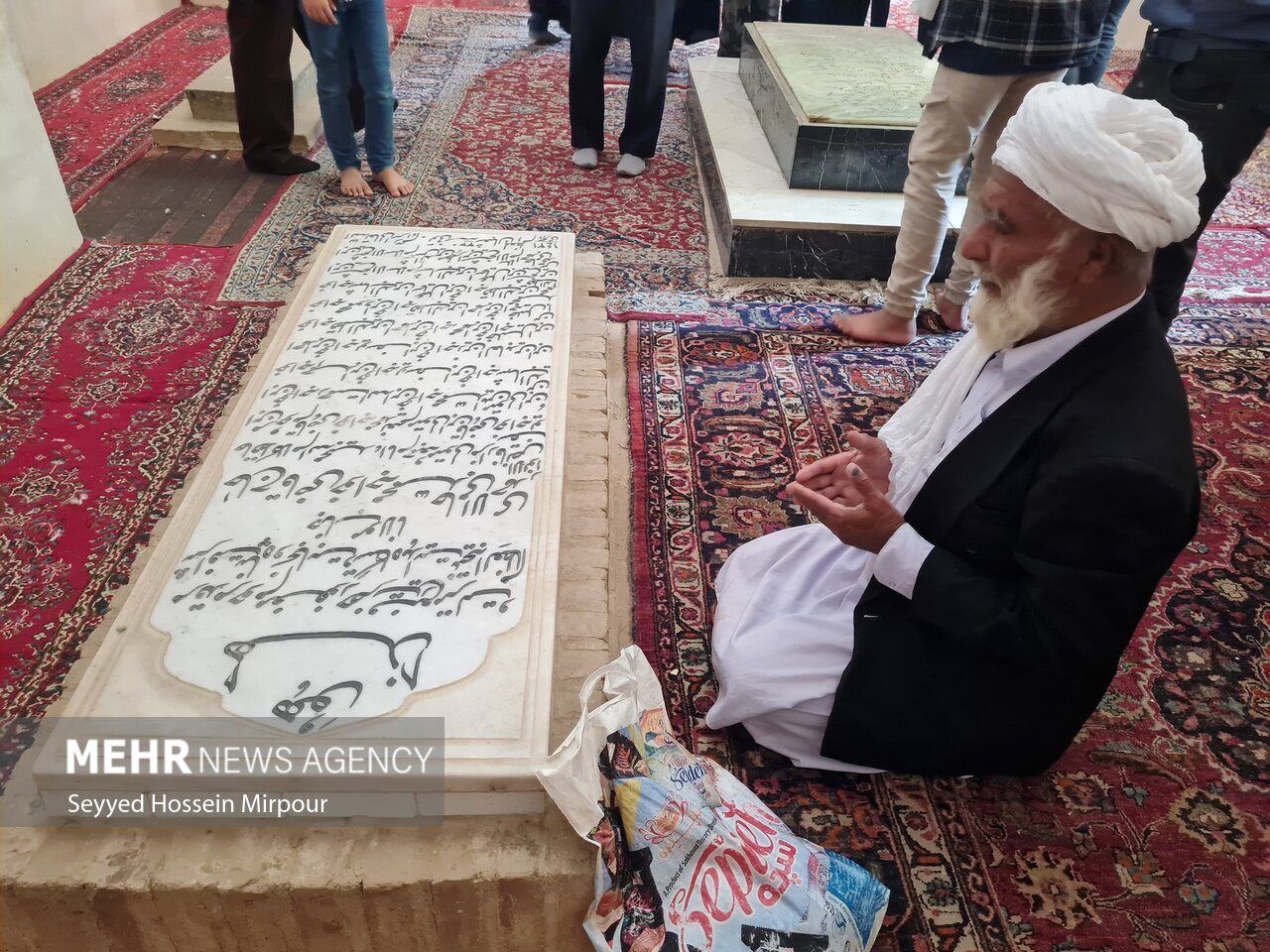
Worshiper at the tomb in 2022

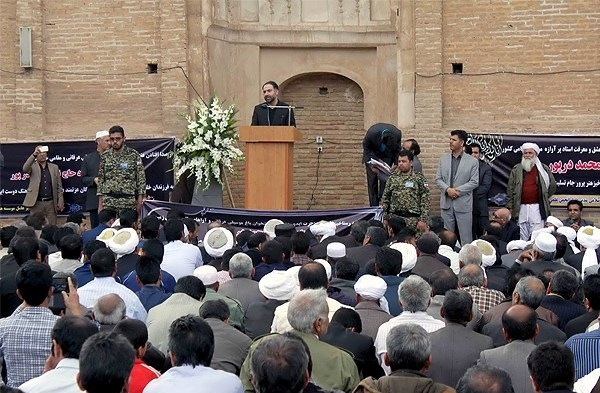
A funeral in 2015

== See also ==
- Islam in Iran
- List of mausoleums in Iran
