= Jamrud Rural District =

Rural district in Razavi Khorasan province, Iran

Jamrud Rural District Persian: دهستان جامرود
- Rural District
- Location within Iran
- Coordinates: 35°22′N 60°46′E
- Country: Iran
- Province: Razavi Khorasan
- County: Torbat-e Jam
- District: Central
- Established: 1987
- Capital: Cheshmeh Gol

Population (2016)
  - Total: 10,724
- Time zone: UTC+3:30 (IRST)

Jamrud Rural District (Persian: دهستان جامرود) is in the Central District of Torbat-e Jam County, Razavi Khorasan province, Iran. Its capital is the village of Cheshmeh Gol.

== Demographics ==
=== Population ===
At the time of the 2006 National Census, the rural district's population was 9,651 in 2,133 households. There were 10,743 inhabitants in 2,697 households at the following census of 2011. The 2016 census measured the population of the rural district as 10,724 in 2,783 households. The most populous of its 23 villages was Yaqutin-e Jadid, with 2,701 people.

=== Other villages in the rural district ===
- Deh Kushkak
- Firuzkuh
- Gur Band
- Hasanabad-e Mulavi
- Qaderabad
- Toq Qoz-e Olya
- Toq Qoz-e Sofla
