= Heshmat Moayyad =

Persian writer and scholar (d. 2018)

Heshmat Moayyad (Persian: حشمت موید) (November 28, 1927 – June 25, 2018) was a Persian writer, translator and the founder of the University of Chicago's Persian program.

Moayyad was a University of Chicago professor for more than 40 years. He translated modern Persian literature into English and German. Moayyad organized major conferences at the university on the Indo-Persian poet Amir Khosrow (died 1325) and on the poet Parvin Etesâmi (died 1941), as well as the first academic conference about “The Baha'i [sic] Faith and Islam” in 1984 at McGill University in Montreal.

== Early life ==
Heshmat Moayyad was born in 1927 in Hamadan, Iran to a Baháʼí family who had Iranian Jewish origins.

== Education ==
After completing his undergraduate studies in Persian and Arabic Literature at the University of Tehran, he went to Tübingen in 1951 to learn German, and by the end of 1952 was studying Orientalistics and German Literature for his PhD with Hellmut Ritter at the Johann Wolfgang Goethe-Universität Frankfurt am Main. He completed his PhD with distinction in 1958.

== Academic career ==
In Frankfurt Moayyad worked as lecturer. In 196o he took a position as professore incaricato at the Istituto Universitario Orientale in Naples. In 1962, he began a year as visiting lecturer at Harvard University. In 1966, as assistant professor at the University of Chicago, he pioneered a "rigorous Persian literature program". In 1974 he became a full professor. He taught there for over 40 years, retired in 2010. He continued to teach at travelling professor at the University of California at Los Angeles and the University of Damascus.

== Personal life ==
In 1948, he interrupted his education with a year of service—travel throughout Iran to work with small Baha'i communities, which resulted in a travelogue published in 2015. It was during this journey that he met Abu'l-Qásim Faizi in Bahrain, who became his spiritual guide.

Moayyad died in Chicago in 2018.

== Legacy ==
The Heshmat Moayyad Lecture Series in Persian Literature and Culture—to honor his work—was inaugurated by the University of Chicago's Department of Near Eastern Languages and Civilizations (NELC) in 2018. to Moayyad who introduced Persian literature to generations of students from 1966 to 2010.

== Books ==
(As Editor)

- Maqāmāt-i Žanda Pīl (Aḥmad-i Ǧām) by Sadīd ad-Dīn Muḥammad Ibn Mūsā Ġaznawī. Bungāh-i Tarjumah va Nashr-i Kitāb, Tehran, 1961.
- Rawz̤at al-rayāḥīn by Darvish Ali Buzjani. Bungāh-i Tarjumah va Nashr-i Kitāb, Tehran, 1966.

(As Author)

- Once a dewdrop : essays on the poetry of Parvin Eʻtesami. Costa Mesa, Calif. : Mazda Publishers, 1994.
- Stories from Iran : a Chicago anthology, 1921-1991. Washington, D.C. : Mage Publishers, 2002.
- The Colossal Elephant and his spiritual feats : Shaykh Ahmad-e Jâm : the life and legend of a popular Sufi saint of 12th century Iran. Costa Mesa, Calif : Mazda Publishers, 2004
- Necklace of the Pleiades: 24 Essays on Persian Literature, Culture and Religion. Leiden University Press, 2010.
