= Jolgeh-ye Musaabad Rural District =

Rural district in Razavi Khorasan province, Iran

Jolgeh-ye Musaabad Rural District Persian: دهستان جلگه موسي آباد
- Rural District
- Location within Iran
- Coordinates: 35°36′N 60°36′E
- Country: Iran
- Province: Razavi Khorasan
- County: Torbat-e Jam
- District: Central
- Established: 1987
- Capital: Musaabad

Population (2016)
  - Total: 8,212
- Time zone: UTC+3:30 (IRST)

Jolgeh-ye Musaabad Rural District (Persian: دهستان جلگه موسي آباد) is in the Central District of Torbat-e Jam County, Razavi Khorasan province, Iran. Its capital is the village of Musaabad.

== Demographics ==
=== Population ===
At the time of the 2006 National Census, the rural district's population was 7,728 in 1,661 households. There were 8,932 inhabitants in 2,313 households at the following census of 2011. The 2016 census measured the population of the rural district as 8,212 in 2,209 households. The most populous of its 17 villages was Teymanak-e Sofla, with 1,451 people.

=== Other villages in the rural district ===
- Almejuq-e Sofla
- Dars Akhund
- Do Sang
- Kalateh-ye Hajji Qazi
- Teymanak-e Olya
- Yekkeh Pesteh
