= Miyan Jam Rural District =

Rural district in Razavi Khorasan province, Iran

Miyan Jam Rural District Persian: دهستان ميان جام
- Rural District
- Location within Iran
- Coordinates: 35°18′N 60°30′E
- Country: Iran
- Province: Razavi Khorasan
- County: Torbat-e Jam
- District: Central
- Established: 1987
- Capital: Esmailabad-e Gorji

Population (2016)
  - Total: 23,867
- Time zone: UTC+3:30 (IRST)

Miyan Jam Rural District (Persian: دهستان ميان جام) is in the Central District of Torbat-e Jam County, Razavi Khorasan province, Iran. Its capital is the village of Esmailabad-e Gorji.

== Demographics ==
=== Population ===
At the time of the 2006 National Census, the rural district's population was 22,862 in 5,076 households. There were 24,205 inhabitants in 6,114 households at the following census of 2011. The 2016 census measured the population of the rural district as 23,867 in 6,123 households. The most populous of its 46 villages was Bezd, with 2,716 people.

=== Other villages in the rural district ===
- Amghan
- Bagh Sangan-e Olya
- Kalateh-ye Marvi
- Mahmanshahr-e Torbat-e Jam
- Mahmudabad-e Olya
- Mahmudabad-e Sofla
- Nowdeh
- Rovenj
