= Central District (Torbat-e Jam County) =

District in Razavi Khorasan province, Iran

Central District (Torbat-e Jam County) Persian: بخش مرکزی شهرستان تربت جام
- District
- Location within Iran
- Coordinates: 35°23′N 60°38′E
- Country: Iran
- Province: Razavi Khorasan
- County: Torbat-e Jam
- Capital: Torbat-e Jam

Population (2016)
  - Total: 143,252
- Time zone: UTC+3:30 (IRST)

The Central District of Torbat-e Jam County (Persian: بخش مرکزی شهرستان تربت جام) is in Razavi Khorasan province, Iran. Its capital is the city of Torbat-e Jam.

== Demographics ==
=== Population ===
At the time of the 2006 National Census, the district's population was 123,799 in 27,981 households. The following census in 2011 counted 138,638 people in 35,094 households. The 2016 census measured the population of the district as 143,252 inhabitants in 38,271 households.

=== Administrative divisions ===
Central District (Torbat-e Jam County) Population
Administrative Divisions	2006	2011	2016
Jamrud RD	9,651	10,743	10,724
Jolgeh-ye Musaabad RD	7,728	8,932	8,212
Miyan Jam RD	22,862	24,205	23,867
Torbat-e Jam (city)	83,558	94,758	100,449
Total	123,799	138,638	143,252
RD = Rural District
