= Shurestan =

Shurestan (Persian: شورستان) may refer to:

- Shurestan, Ardabil
- Shurestan, Razavi Khorasan
- Shurestan, South Khorasan
- Shurestan-e Olya, Qazvin
- Shurestan-e Olya, Razavi Khorasan
- Shurestan-e Sofla, Qazvin
- Shurestan-e Sofla, Razavi Khorasan
