= Kondeh Sukhteh =

Village in Razavi Khorasan province, Iran

Kondeh Sukhteh Persian: كنده سوخته
- Village
- Location within Iran
- Coordinates: 35°23′57″N 61°09′21″E
- Country: Iran
- Province: Razavi Khorasan
- County: Salehabad
- District: Jannatabad
- Rural District: Ostay

Population (2016)
  - Total: 79
- Time zone: UTC+3:30 (IRST)

Kondeh Sukhteh (Persian: كنده سوخته) (Note: Also romanized as Kondeh Sūkhteh) is a village in Ostay Rural District of Jannatabad District in Salehabad County, Razavi Khorasan province, Iran.

== Demographics ==
=== Population ===
At the time of the 2006 National Census, the village's population was 93 in 22 households, when it was in Jannatabad Rural District of the former Salehabad District in Torbat-e Jam County. The following census in 2011 counted 120 people in 26 households. The 2016 census measured the population of the village as 79 people in 19 households.

In 2018, the district was separated from the county in the establishment of Salehabad County. The rural district was transferred to the new Jannatabad District, and Kondeh Sukhteh was transferred to Ostay Rural District created in the same district.
