= Padeh-ye Musa Khan =

Village in Razavi Khorasan province, Iran

Padeh-ye Musa Khan Persian: پده موسي خان
- Village
- Location within Iran
- Coordinates: 35°29′01″N 61°08′34″E
- Country: Iran
- Province: Razavi Khorasan
- County: Salehabad
- District: Jannatabad
- Rural District: Ostay

Population (2016)
  - Total: 272
- Time zone: UTC+3:30 (IRST)

Padeh-ye Musa Khan (Persian: پده موسي خان) (Note: Also romanized as Padeh-ye Mūsá Khān; also known as Kārīzcheh (كاريزچه) and Padeh-ye Ḩoseyn Kūr (پده حسين كور)) is a village in Ostay Rural District of Jannatabad District in Salehabad County, Razavi Khorasan province, Iran.

== Demographics ==
=== Population ===
At the time of the 2006 National Census, the village's population was 359 in 76 households, when it was in Jannatabad Rural District of the former Salehabad District in Torbat-e Jam County. The following census in 2011 counted 347 people in 84 households. The 2016 census measured the population of the village as 272 people in 66 households.

In 2018, the district was separated from the county in the establishment of Salehabad County. The rural district was transferred to the new Jannatabad District, and Padeh-ye Musa Khan was transferred to Ostay Rural District created in the same district.
