= Tut-e Lashkaran =

Village in Razavi Khorasan province, Iran

Tut-e Lashkaran Persian: توت لشكران
- Village
- Location within Iran
- Coordinates: 35°30′04″N 61°06′03″E
- Country: Iran
- Province: Razavi Khorasan
- County: Salehabad
- District: Jannatabad
- Rural District: Ostay

Population (2016)
  - Total: 261
- Time zone: UTC+3:30 (IRST)

Tut-e Lashkaran (Persian: توت لشكران) (Note: Also romanized as Tūt-e Lashkarān) is a village in Ostay Rural District of Jannatabad District in Salehabad County, Razavi Khorasan province, Iran.

== Demographics ==
=== Population ===
At the time of the 2006 National Census, the village's population was 254 in 58 households, when it was in Jannatabad Rural District of the former Salehabad District in Torbat-e Jam County. The following census in 2011 counted 224 people in 55 households. The 2016 census measured the population of the village as 261 people in 62 households.

In 2018, the district was separated from the county in the establishment of Salehabad County. The rural district was transferred to the new Jannatabad District, and Tut-e Lashkaran was transferred to Ostay Rural District created in the same district.
