= Ostay-ye Sofla =

Village in Razavi Khorasan province, Iran

Ostay-ye Sofla Persian: استاي سفلي
- Village
- Location within Iran
- Coordinates: 35°26′56″N 61°08′37″E
- Country: Iran
- Province: Razavi Khorasan
- County: Salehabad
- District: Jannatabad
- Rural District: Ostay

Population (2016)
  - Total: 310
- Time zone: UTC+3:30 (IRST)

Ostay-ye Sofla (Persian: استاي سفلي) (Note: Also romanized as Ostāy-ye Soflá; also known as Ostā-ye Pā’īn and Ostāy-ye Pā’īn) is a village in Ostay Rural District of Jannatabad District in Salehabad County, Razavi Khorasan province, Iran.

== Demographics ==
=== Population ===
At the time of the 2006 National Census, the village's population was 413 in 81 households, when it was in Jannatabad Rural District of the former Salehabad District in Torbat-e Jam County. The following census in 2011 counted 379 people in 88 households. The 2016 census measured the population of the village as 310 people in 72 households.

In 2018, the district was separated from the county in the establishment of Salehabad County. The rural district was transferred to the new Jannatabad District, and Ostay-ye Sofla was transferred to Ostay Rural District created in the same district.
