= Cheshmeh Anjir, Razavi Khorasan =

Village in Razavi Khorasan province, Iran

Cheshmeh Anjir Persian: چشمه انجير
- Village
- Location within Iran
- Coordinates: 35°29′30″N 61°07′58″E
- Country: Iran
- Province: Razavi Khorasan
- County: Salehabad
- District: Jannatabad
- Rural District: Ostay

Population (2016)
  - Total: 239
- Time zone: UTC+3:30 (IRST)

Cheshmeh Anjir (Persian: چشمه انجير) (Note: Also romanized as Cheshmeh Anjīr; also known as Anjīr) is a village in Ostay Rural District of Jannatabad District in Salehabad County, Razavi Khorasan province, Iran.

== Demographics ==
=== Population ===
At the time of the 2006 National Census, the village's population was 341 in 61 households, when it was in Jannatabad Rural District of the former Salehabad District in Torbat-e Jam County. The following census in 2011 counted 291 people in 60 households. The 2016 census measured the population of the village as 239 people in 59 households.

In 2018, the district was separated from the county in the establishment of Salehabad County. The rural district was transferred to the new Jannatabad District, and Cheshmeh Anjir was transferred to Ostay Rural District created in the same district.
