= Kariz-e Now, Salehabad =

Village in Razavi Khorasan province, Iran

Kariz-e Now Persian: كاريزنو
- Village
- Location within Iran
- Country: Iran
- Province: Razavi Khorasan
- County: Salehabad
- District: Jannatabad
- Rural District: Ostay

Population (2016)
  - Total: 61
- Time zone: UTC+3:30 (IRST)

Kariz-e Now (Persian: كاريزنو) (Note: Also romanized as Kariz Now, Kārīz Now, and Kārīz-e Now) is a village in Ostay Rural District of Jannatabad District in Salehabad County, Razavi Khorasan province, Iran.

== Demographics ==
=== Population ===
At the time of the 2006 National Census, the village's population was 103 in 21 households, when it was in Jannatabad Rural District of the former Salehabad District in Torbat-e Jam County. The following census in 2011 counted 79 people in 18 households. The 2016 census measured the population of the village as 61 people in 19 households.

In 2018, the district was separated from the county in the establishment of Salehabad County. The rural district was transferred to the new Jannatabad District, and Kariz-e Now was transferred to Ostay Rural District created in the same district.
