= Har Kareh =

Village in Razavi Khorasan province, Iran

Har Kareh Persian: هركاره
- Village
- Location within Iran
- Coordinates: 35°31′24″N 61°07′57″E
- Country: Iran
- Province: Razavi Khorasan
- County: Salehabad
- District: Jannatabad
- Rural District: Ostay

Population (2016)
  - Total: 86
- Time zone: UTC+3:30 (IRST)

Har Kareh (Persian: هركاره) (Note: Also romanized as Har Kāreh; also known as Āḵāreh (اكاره) and Ar Kāreh) is a village in Ostay Rural District of Jannatabad District in Salehabad County, Razavi Khorasan province, Iran.

== Demographics ==
=== Population ===
At the time of the 2006 National Census, the village's population was 122 in 29 households, when it was in Jannatabad Rural District of the former Salehabad District in Torbat-e Jam County. The following census in 2011 counted 101 people in 25 households. The 2016 census measured the population of the village as 86 people in 23 households.

In 2018, the district was separated from the county in the establishment of Salehabad County. The rural district was transferred to the new Jannatabad District, and Har Kareh was transferred to Ostay Rural District created in the same district.
