= Karizak-e Hajji Pasand =

Village in Razavi Khorasan province, Iran

Karizak-e Hajji Pasand Persian: كاريزك حاجي پسند
- Village
- Location within Iran
- Coordinates: 35°32′05″N 61°09′48″E
- Country: Iran
- Province: Razavi Khorasan
- County: Salehabad
- District: Jannatabad
- Rural District: Ostay

Population (2016)
  - Total: 222
- Time zone: UTC+3:30 (IRST)

Karizak-e Hajji Pasand (Persian: كاريزك حاجي پسند) (Note: Also romanized as Kārīzak-e Ḩājjī Pasand; also known as Kārīzak (كاريزك) and Kārīzak-e Ḩājj Pasand) is a village in Ostay Rural District of Jannatabad District in Salehabad County, Razavi Khorasan province, Iran.

== Demographics ==
=== Population ===
At the time of the 2006 National Census, the village's population was 334 in 74 households, when it was in Jannatabad Rural District of the former Salehabad District in Torbat-e Jam County. The following census in 2011 counted 342 people in 77 households. The 2016 census measured the population of the village as 222 people in 53 households.

In 2018, the district was separated from the county in the establishment of Salehabad County. The rural district was transferred to the new Jannatabad District, and Karizak-e Hajji Pasand was transferred to Ostay Rural District created in the same district.
