= Ostay-ye Olya =

Village in Razavi Khorasan province, Iran

Ostay-ye Olya Persian: استاي عليا
- Village
- Location within Iran
- Coordinates: 35°26′30″N 61°05′15″E
- Country: Iran
- Province: Razavi Khorasan
- County: Salehabad
- District: Jannatabad
- Rural District: Ostay

Population (2016)
  - Total: 197
- Time zone: UTC+3:30 (IRST)

Ostay-ye Olya (Persian: استاي عليا) (Note: Also romanized as Ostāy-ye ‘Olyā; also known as 'Ostā-ye Bālā, Ostāy, Qal‘eh Istui, Qal‘eh-ye Isūn, and Qal‘eh-ye Ostā’ī) is a village in Ostay Rural District of Jannatabad District in Salehabad County, Razavi Khorasan province, Iran.

== Demographics ==
=== Population ===
At the time of the 2006 National Census, the village's population was 196 in 38 households, when it was in Jannatabad Rural District of the former Salehabad District in Torbat-e Jam County. The following census in 2011 counted 179 people in 40 households. The 2016 census measured the population of the village as 197 people in 42 households.

In 2018, the district was separated from the county in the establishment of Salehabad County. The rural district was transferred to the new Jannatabad District, and Ostay-ye Olya was transferred to Ostay Rural District created in the same district.
