= Tut-e Seyyed Mohammad =

Village in Razavi Khorasan province, Iran

Tut-e Seyyed Mohammad Persian: توت سيدمحمد
- Village
- Location within Iran
- Coordinates: 35°33′23″N 61°00′57″E
- Country: Iran
- Province: Razavi Khorasan
- County: Salehabad
- District: Jannatabad
- Rural District: Ostay

Population (2016)
  - Total: 270
- Time zone: UTC+3:30 (IRST)

Tut-e Seyyed Mohammad (Persian: توت سيدمحمد) (Note: Also romanized as Tūt-e Seyyed Moḩammad) is a village in Ostay Rural District of Jannatabad District in Salehabad County, Razavi Khorasan province, Iran.

== Demographics ==
=== Population ===
At the time of the 2006 National Census, the village's population was 280 in 55 households, when it was in Jannatabad Rural District of the former Salehabad District in Torbat-e Jam County. The following census in 2011 counted 278 people in 64 households. The 2016 census measured the population of the village as 270 people in 66 households.

In 2018, the district was separated from the county in the establishment of Salehabad County. The rural district was transferred to the new Jannatabad District, and Tut-e Seyyed Mohammad was transferred to Ostay Rural District created in the same district.
