= Gush Laghar =

Village in Razavi Khorasan province, Iran

Gush Laghar Persian: گوش لاغر
- Village
- Location within Iran
- Coordinates: 35°42′52″N 60°56′50″E
- Country: Iran
- Province: Razavi Khorasan
- County: Salehabad
- District: Central
- Rural District: Salehabad

Population (2016)
  - Total: 1,574
- Time zone: UTC+3:30 (IRST)

Gush Laghar (Persian: گوش لاغر) (Note: Also romanized as Gūsh Lāghar; also known as Qūsh (قوش)) is a village in Salehabad Rural District of the Central District in Salehabad County, Razavi Khorasan province, Iran.

== Demographics ==
=== Population ===
At the time of the 2006 National Census, the village's population was 1,376 in 313 households, when it was in the former Salehabad District of Torbat-e Jam County. The following census in 2011 counted 1,595 people in 381 households. The 2016 census measured the population of the village as 1,574 people in 422 households, the most populous in its rural district.

In 2018, the district was separated from the county in the establishment of Salehabad County, and the rural district was transferred to the new Central District.
