= Pir Vahsh =

Village in Razavi Khorasan province, Iran

Pir Vahsh Persian: پيروحش
- Village
- Location within Iran
- Coordinates: 35°53′22″N 61°03′20″E
- Country: Iran
- Province: Razavi Khorasan
- County: Salehabad
- District: Central
- Rural District: Bagh-e Keshmir

Population (2016)
  - Total: 287
- Time zone: UTC+3:30 (IRST)

Pir Vahsh (Persian: پيروحش) (Note: Also romanized as Pīr Vaḩsh; also known as Pīr Vash) is a village in Bagh-e Keshmir Rural District of the Central District in Salehabad County, Razavi Khorasan province, Iran.

== Demographics ==
=== Population ===
At the time of the 2006 National Census, the village's population was 393 in 73 households, when it was in the former Salehabad District of Torbat-e Jam County. The following census in 2011 counted 291 people in 67 households. The 2016 census measured the population of the village as 287 people in 80 households.

In 2018, the district was separated from the county in the establishment of Salehabad County, and the rural district was transferred to the new Central District.
