= Borjak-e Sheykhi =

Village in Razavi Khorasan province, Iran

Borjak-e Sheykhi Persian: برجك شيخي
- Village
- Location within Iran
- Coordinates: 35°33′36″N 61°08′25″E
- Country: Iran
- Province: Razavi Khorasan
- County: Salehabad
- District: Jannatabad
- Rural District: Jannatabad

Population (2016)
  - Total: 314
- Time zone: UTC+3:30 (IRST)

Borjak-e Sheykhi (Persian: برجك شيخي) (Note: Also romanized as Borjak-e Sheykhī) is a village in Jannatabad Rural District of Jannatabad District in Salehabad County, Razavi Khorasan province, Iran.

== Demographics ==
=== Population ===
At the time of the 2006 National Census, the village's population was 346 in 65 households, when it was in the former Salehabad District of Torbat-e Jam County. The following census in 2011 counted 332 people in 81 households. The 2016 census measured the population of the village as 314 people in 78 households.

In 2018, the district was separated from the county in the establishment of Salehabad County, and the rural district was transferred to the new Jannatabad District.
