= Kal-e Karab =

Village in Razavi Khorasan province, Iran

Kal-e Karab Persian: كال كراب
- Village
- Location within Iran
- Coordinates: 35°49′47″N 60°53′48″E
- Country: Iran
- Province: Razavi Khorasan
- County: Salehabad
- District: Central
- Rural District: Bagh-e Keshmir

Population (2016)
  - Total: 437
- Time zone: UTC+3:30 (IRST)

Kal-e Karab (Persian: كال كراب) (Note: Also romanized as Kāl-e Karāb; also known as Kāl-e Karū (كال كرو)) is a village in Bagh-e Keshmir Rural District of the Central District in Salehabad County, Razavi Khorasan province, Iran.

== Demographics ==
=== Population ===
At the time of the 2006 National Census, the village's population was 430 in 100 households, when it was in the former Salehabad District of Torbat-e Jam County. The following census in 2011 counted 436 people in 99 households. The 2016 census measured the population of the village as 437 people in 115 households.

In 2018, the district was separated from the county in the establishment of Salehabad County, and the rural district was transferred to the new Central District.
