= Kal Aqayeh-ye Olya =

Village in Razavi Khorasan province, Iran

Kal Aqayeh-ye Olya Persian: كال اقايه عليا
- Village
- Location within Iran
- Coordinates: 35°44′11″N 61°07′15″E
- Country: Iran
- Province: Razavi Khorasan
- County: Salehabad
- District: Central
- Rural District: Salehabad

Population (2016)
  - Total: 311
- Time zone: UTC+3:30 (IRST)

Kal Aqayeh-ye Olya (Persian: كال اقايه عليا) (Note: Also romanized as Kāl Āqāyeh-ye ‘Olyā; also known as Kāl Āqāyeh) is a village in Salehabad Rural District of the Central District in Salehabad County, Razavi Khorasan province, Iran.

== Demographics ==
=== Population ===
At the time of the 2006 National Census, the village's population was 307 in 70 households, when it was in the former Salehabad District of Torbat-e Jam County. The following census in 2011 counted 334 people in 79 households. The 2016 census measured the population of the village as 311 people in 85 households.

In 2018, the district was separated from the county in the establishment of Salehabad County, and the rural district was transferred to the new Central District.
