= Abbasabad-e Kheyrabad =

Village in Razavi Khorasan province, Iran

Abbasabad-e Kheyrabad Persian: عباس ابادخيراباد
- Village
- Location within Iran
- Coordinates: 35°54′50″N 61°04′22″E
- Country: Iran
- Province: Razavi Khorasan
- County: Salehabad
- District: Central
- Rural District: Salehabad

Population (2016)
  - Total: 83
- Time zone: UTC+3:30 (IRST)

Abbasabad-e Kheyrabad (Persian: عباس ابادخيراباد) (Note: Also romanized as ʿAbbāsābād-e Kheyrābād) is a village in Salehabad Rural District of the Central District in Salehabad County, Razavi Khorasan province, Iran.

== Demographics ==
=== Population ===
At the time of the 2006 National Census, the village's population was 105 in 20 households, when it was in the former Salehabad District of Torbat-e Jam County. The following census in 2011 counted 98 people in 21 households. The 2016 census measured the population of the village as 83 people in 21 households.

In 2018, the district was separated from the county in the establishment of Salehabad County, and the rural district was transferred to the new Central District.
