= Jahanabad, Salehabad =

Village in Razavi Khorasan province, Iran

Jahanabad Persian: جهان اباد
- Village
- Location within Iran
- Coordinates: 35°44′22″N 61°04′40″E
- Country: Iran
- Province: Razavi Khorasan
- County: Salehabad
- District: Central
- Rural District: Salehabad

Population (2016)
  - Total: 80
- Time zone: UTC+3:30 (IRST)

Jahanabad (Persian: جهان اباد) (Note: Also romanized as Jahānābād; also known as Jahānābād-e ‘Alī Ashraf (جهان ابادعلي اشرف)) is a village in Salehabad Rural District of the Central District in Salehabad County, Razavi Khorasan province, Iran.

== Demographics ==
=== Population ===
At the time of the 2006 National Census, the village's population was 51 in 15 households, when it was in the former Salehabad District of Torbat-e Jam County. The following census in 2011 counted 64 people in 16 households. The 2016 census measured the population of the village as 80 people in 20 households.

In 2018, the district was separated from the county in the establishment of Salehabad County, and the rural district was transferred to the new Central District.
