= Abu Torab, Iran =

Village in Razavi Khorasan province, Iran

Abu Torab Persian: ابوتراب
- Village
- Location within Iran
- Coordinates: 35°37′06″N 61°03′42″E
- Country: Iran
- Province: Razavi Khorasan
- County: Salehabad
- District: Jannatabad
- Rural District: Jannatabad

Population (2016)
  - Total: 41
- Time zone: UTC+3:30 (IRST)

Abu Torab (Persian: ابوتراب) (Note: Also romanized as Abū Torāb) is a village in Jannatabad Rural District of Jannatabad District in Salehabad County, Razavi Khorasan province, Iran.

== Demographics ==
=== Population ===
At the time of the 2006 National Census, the village's population was 56 in 13 households, when it was in the former Salehabad District of Torbat-e Jam County. The following census in 2011 counted 64 people in 18 households. The 2016 census measured the population of the village as 41 people in 15 households.

In 2018, the district was separated from the county in the establishment of Salehabad County, and the rural district was transferred to the new Jannatabad District.
