= Kalateh-ye Hajji Rahmat =

Village in Razavi Khorasan province, Iran

Kalateh-ye Hajji Rahmat Persian: كلاته حاجي رحمت
- Village
- Location within Iran
- Coordinates: 35°54′53″N 61°10′20″E
- Country: Iran
- Province: Razavi Khorasan
- County: Salehabad
- District: Central
- Rural District: Salehabad

Population (2016)
  - Total: 17
- Time zone: UTC+3:30 (IRST)

Kalateh-ye Hajji Rahmat (Persian: كلاته حاجي رحمت) (Note: Also romanized as Kalāteh-ye Ḩājjī Raḩmat; also known as Kalāteh-ye Ḩājjī ‘Abd ol Raḩmān) is a village in Salehabad Rural District of the Central District in Salehabad County, Razavi Khorasan province, Iran.

== Demographics ==
=== Population ===
At the time of the 2006 National Census, the village's population was 53 in 11 households, when it was in the former Salehabad District of Torbat-e Jam County. The following census in 2011 counted 43 people in 10 households. The 2016 census measured the population of the village as 17 people in four households.

In 2018, the district was separated from the county in the establishment of Salehabad County, and the rural district was transferred to the new Central District.
