= Khvajeh Taun =

Village in Razavi Khorasan province, Iran

Khvajeh Taun Persian: خواجه طاعون
- Village
- Location within Iran
- Coordinates: 35°32′41″N 60°54′24″E
- Country: Iran
- Province: Razavi Khorasan
- County: Salehabad
- District: Central
- Rural District: Qaleh Hamam

Population (2016)
  - Total: 394
- Time zone: UTC+3:30 (IRST)

Khvajeh Taun (Persian: خواجه طاعون) (Note: Also romanized as Khvājeh Ţā‘ūn; also known as Khvājeh Ţāghūn) is a village in Qaleh Hamam Rural District of the Central District in Salehabad County, Razavi Khorasan province, Iran.

== Demographics ==
=== Population ===
At the time of the 2006 National Census, the village's population was 426 in 94 households, when it was in the former Salehabad District of Torbat-e Jam County. The following census in 2011 counted 410 people in 100 households. The 2016 census measured the population of the village as 394 people in 114 households.

In 2018, the district was separated from the county in the establishment of Salehabad County, and the rural district was transferred to the new Central District.
