= Jahanabad-e Maleki =

Village in Razavi Khorasan province, Iran

Jahanabad-e Maleki Persian: جهان ابادملكي
- Village
- Location within Iran
- Coordinates: 35°39′21″N 61°02′34″E
- Country: Iran
- Province: Razavi Khorasan
- County: Salehabad
- District: Central
- Rural District: Qaleh Hamam

Population (2016)
  - Total: 380
- Time zone: UTC+3:30 (IRST)

Jahanabad-e Maleki (Persian: جهان ابادملكي) (Note: Also romanized as Jahānābād-e Malekī; also known as Jahānābād) is a village in Qaleh Hamam Rural District of the Central District in Salehabad County, Razavi Khorasan province, Iran.

== Demographics ==
=== Population ===
At the time of the 2006 National Census, the village's population was 507 in 105 households, when it was in the former Salehabad District of Torbat-e Jam County. The following census in 2011 counted 472 people in 122 households. The 2016 census measured the population of the village as 380 people in 107 households.

In 2018, the district was separated from the county in the establishment of Salehabad County, and the rural district was transferred to the new Central District.
