= Nasrabad, Salehabad =

Village in Razavi Khorasan province, Iran

Nasrabad Persian: نصراباد
- Village
- Location within Iran
- Coordinates: 35°37′38″N 61°09′43″E
- Country: Iran
- Province: Razavi Khorasan
- County: Salehabad
- District: Jannatabad
- Rural District: Jannatabad

Population (2016)
  - Total: 132
- Time zone: UTC+3:30 (IRST)

Nasrabad (Persian: نصراباد) (Note: Also romanized as Naşrābād) is a village in Jannatabad Rural District of Jannatabad District in Salehabad County, Razavi Khorasan province, Iran.

== Demographics ==
=== Population ===
At the time of the 2006 National Census, the village's population was 91 in 20 households, when it was in the former Salehabad District of Torbat-e Jam County. The following census in 2011 counted 97 people in 28 households. The 2016 census measured the population of the village as 132 people in 37 households.

In 2018, the district was separated from the county in the establishment of Salehabad County, and the rural district was transferred to the new Jannatabad District.
