= Kalateh-ye Deh Now =

Village in Razavi Khorasan province, Iran

Kalateh-ye Deh Now Persian: كلاته دهنو
- Village
- Location within Iran
- Coordinates: 35°36′47″N 61°13′34″E
- Country: Iran
- Province: Razavi Khorasan
- County: Salehabad
- District: Jannatabad
- Rural District: Jannatabad

Population (2016)
  - Total: 85
- Time zone: UTC+3:30 (IRST)

Kalateh-ye Deh Now (Persian: كلاته دهنو) (Note: Also romanized as Kalateh Deh Now, Kalāteh Deh Now, and Kalāteh-ye Deh Now; also known as Deh Now) is a village in Jannatabad Rural District of Jannatabad District in Salehabad County, Razavi Khorasan province, Iran.

== Demographics ==
=== Population ===
At the time of the 2006 National Census, the village's population was 151 in 38 households, when it was in the former Salehabad District of Torbat-e Jam County. The following census in 2011 counted 157 people in 40 households. The 2016 census measured the population of the village as 85 people in 27 households.

In 2018, the district was separated from the county in the establishment of Salehabad County, and the rural district was transferred to the new Jannatabad District.
