= Khorramabad-e Olya, Razavi Khorasan =

Village in Razavi Khorasan province, Iran

Khorramabad-e Olya Persian: خرم اباد عليا
- Village
- Location within Iran
- Coordinates: 35°31′29″N 61°02′29″E
- Country: Iran
- Province: Razavi Khorasan
- County: Salehabad
- District: Jannatabad
- Rural District: Ostay

Population (2016)
  - Total: 888
- Time zone: UTC+3:30 (IRST)

Khorramabad-e Olya (Persian: خرم اباد عليا) (Note: Also romanized as Khorramābād-e ‘Olyā; also known as Shahveh-ye ‘Olyā (شهوه عليا)) is a village in Ostay Rural District of Jannatabad District in Salehabad County, Razavi Khorasan province, Iran.

== Demographics ==
=== Population ===
At the time of the 2006 National Census, the village's population was 1,098 in 222 households, when it was in Jannatabad Rural District of the former Salehabad District in Torbat-e Jam County. The following census in 2011 counted 975 people in 210 households. The 2016 census measured the population of the village as 888 people in 208 households.

In 2018, the district was separated from the county in the establishment of Salehabad County. The rural district was transferred to the new Jannatabad District, and Khorramabad-e Olya was transferred to Ostay Rural District created in the same district.
