= Naqdali =

Naqdali (Persian: نقدعلي) may refer to:

- Naqdali-ye Olya
- Naqdali-ye Sofla
- Naqd Ali
