= Pariabad =

Pariabad (Persian: پري اباد) may refer to:

- Pariabad, Mashhad, Razavi Khorasan Province
- Pariabad, Quchan, Razavi Khorasan Province
- Pariabad, Torbat-e Jam, Razavi Khorasan Province
- Pariabad, South Khorasan
