= Bani Tak =

Village in Razavi Khorasan province, Iran

Bani Tak Persian: بني تاك
- Village
- Location within Iran
- Coordinates: 35°36′43″N 60°48′35″E
- Country: Iran
- Province: Razavi Khorasan
- County: Salehabad
- District: Central
- Rural District: Qaleh Hamam

Population (2016)
  - Total: 1,740
- Time zone: UTC+3:30 (IRST)

Bani Tak (Persian: بني تاك) (Note: Also romanized as Banī Tāk and Bonī Tāk; also known as Binitak, Mentūq, Mintug, and Mintugi) is a village in Qaleh Hamam Rural District of the Central District in Salehabad County, Razavi Khorasan province, Iran.

== Demographics ==
=== Population ===
At the time of the 2006 National Census, the village's population was 1,336 in 273 households, when it was in the former Salehabad District of Torbat-e Jam County. The following census in 2011 counted 1,679 people in 402 households. The 2016 census measured the population of the village as 1,740 people in 440 households. It was the most populous village in its rural district.

In 2018, the district was separated from the county in the establishment of Salehabad County, and the rural district was transferred to the new Central District.
