= Kariz Khaneh =

Village in Razavi Khorasan province, Iran

Kariz Khaneh Persian: كاريزخانه
- Village
- Location within Iran
- Coordinates: 35°43′18″N 61°05′06″E
- Country: Iran
- Province: Razavi Khorasan
- County: Salehabad
- District: Central
- Rural District: Salehabad

Population (2016)
  - Total: 180
- Time zone: UTC+3:30 (IRST)

Kariz Khaneh (Persian: كاريزخانه) (Note: Also romanized as Kārīz Khāneh; formerly known as Kārīz Khān (كاريزخان); also known as Qal‘eh Kārīz and Shāzdeh (شازده)) is a village in Salehabad Rural District of the Central District in Salehabad County, Razavi Khorasan province, Iran.

== Demographics ==
=== Population ===
At the time of the 2006 National Census, the village's population was 125 in 32 households, when it was in the former Salehabad District of Torbat-e Jam County. The following census in 2011 counted 141 people in 38 households. The 2016 census measured the population of the village as 180 people in 44 households.

In 2018, the district was separated from the county in the establishment of Salehabad County, and the rural district was transferred to the new Central District.
