= Yekkeh Tut, Razavi Khorasan =

Village in Razavi Khorasan province, Iran

Yekkeh Tut Persian: يكه توت
- Village
- Location within Iran
- Coordinates: 35°37′55″N 61°01′02″E
- Country: Iran
- Province: Razavi Khorasan
- County: Salehabad
- District: Central
- Rural District: Qaleh Hamam

Population (2016)
  - Total: 1,019
- Time zone: UTC+3:30 (IRST)

Yekkeh Tut (Persian: يكه توت) (Note: Also romanized as Yekkeh Tūt) is a village in Qaleh Hamam Rural District of the Central District in Salehabad County, Razavi Khorasan province, Iran.

== Demographics ==
=== Population ===
At the time of the 2006 National Census, the village's population was 925 in 205 households, when it was in the former Salehabad District of Torbat-e Jam County. The following census in 2011 counted 1,071 people in 272 households. The 2016 census measured the population of the village as 1,019 people in 269 households.

In 2018, the district was separated from the county in the establishment of Salehabad County, and the rural district was transferred to the new Central District.
