= Gormasi =

Village in Razavi Khorasan province, Iran

Gormasi Persian: گرماسي
- Village
- Location within Iran
- Coordinates: 35°37′45″N 61°08′16″E
- Country: Iran
- Province: Razavi Khorasan
- County: Salehabad
- District: Jannatabad
- Rural District: Jannatabad

Population (2016)
  - Total: 104
- Time zone: UTC+3:30 (IRST)

Gormasi (Persian: گرماسي) (Note: Also romanized as Gormāsī) is a village in Jannatabad Rural District of Jannatabad District in Salehabad County, Razavi Khorasan province, Iran.

== Demographics ==
=== Population ===
At the time of the 2006 National Census, the village's population was 117 in 24 households, when it was in the former Salehabad District of Torbat-e Jam County. The following census in 2011 counted 88 people in 25 households. The 2016 census measured the population of the village as 104 people in 36 households.

In 2018, the district was separated from the county in the establishment of Salehabad County, and the rural district was transferred to the new Jannatabad District.
