= Siah Khowleh =

Village in Razavi Khorasan province, Iran

Siah Khowleh Persian: سياه خوله
- Village
- Location within Iran
- Coordinates: 35°36′35″N 61°11′05″E
- Country: Iran
- Province: Razavi Khorasan
- County: Salehabad
- District: Jannatabad
- Rural District: Jannatabad

Population (2016)
  - Total: 188
- Time zone: UTC+3:30 (IRST)

Siah Khowleh (Persian: سياه خوله) (Note: Also romanized as Sīāh Khowleh; also known as Kalāteh-ye Sīāh Kholeh) is a village in Jannatabad Rural District of Jannatabad District in Salehabad County, Razavi Khorasan province, Iran.

== Demographics ==
=== Population ===
At the time of the 2006 National Census, the village's population was 390 in 80 households, when it was in the former Salehabad District of Torbat-e Jam County. The following census in 2011 counted 284 people in 73 households. The 2016 census measured the population of the village as 188 people in 58 households.

In 2018, the district was separated from the county in the establishment of Salehabad County, and the rural district was transferred to the new Jannatabad District.
