= Qaleh Hammam =

Village in Razavi Khorasan province, Iran

Qaleh Hammam Persian: قلعه حمام
- Village
- Location within Iran
- Coordinates: 35°38′19″N 60°45′31″E
- Country: Iran
- Province: Razavi Khorasan
- County: Salehabad
- District: Central
- Rural District: Qaleh Hamam

Population (2016)
  - Total: 136
- Time zone: UTC+3:30 (IRST)

Qaleh Hammam (Persian: قلعه حمام) (Note: Also romanized as Qal‘eh Ḩammām) is a village in Qaleh Hamam Rural District of the Central District in Salehabad County, Razavi Khorasan province, Iran.

== Demographics ==
=== Population ===
At the time of the 2006 National Census, the village's population was 86 in 19 households, when it was in the former Salehabad District of Torbat-e Jam County. The following census in 2011 counted 92 people in 22 households. The 2016 census measured the population of the village as 136 people in 42 households.

In 2018, the district was separated from the county in the establishment of Salehabad County, and the rural district was transferred to the new Central District.
