= Khorramabad-e Sofla, Razavi Khorasan =

Village in Razavi Khorasan province, Iran

Khorramabad-e Sofla Persian: خرم اباد سفلي
- Village
- Location within Iran
- Coordinates: 35°33′06″N 61°02′42″E
- Country: Iran
- Province: Razavi Khorasan
- County: Salehabad
- District: Jannatabad
- Rural District: Ostay

Population (2016)
  - Total: 48
- Time zone: UTC+3:30 (IRST)

Khorramabad-e Sofla (Persian: خرم اباد سفلي) (Note: Also romanized as Khorramābād-e Soflá; also known as Shahveh-ye Soflá (شهوه سفلي)) is a village in Ostay Rural District of Jannatabad District in Salehabad County, Razavi Khorasan province, Iran.

== Demographics ==
=== Population ===
At the time of the 2006 National Census, the village's population was 81 in 17 households, when it was in Jannatabad Rural District of the former Salehabad District in Torbat-e Jam County. The following census in 2011 counted 71 people in 16 households. The 2016 census measured the population of the village as 48 people in 14 households.

In 2018, the district was separated from the county in the establishment of Salehabad County. The rural district was transferred to the new Jannatabad District, and Khorramabad-e Sofla was transferred to Ostay Rural District created in the same district.
