= Shahrak-e Mohammad Hajji =

Village in Razavi Khorasan province, Iran

Shahrak-e Mohammad Hajji Persian: شهرك محمدحاجي
- Village
- Country: Iran
- Province: Razavi Khorasan
- County: Salehabad
- District: Central
- Rural District: Salehabad

Population (2016)
  - Total: 47
- Time zone: UTC+3:30 (IRST)

Shahrak-e Mohammad Hajji (Persian: شهرك محمدحاجي) (Note: Also romanized as Shahraḵ-e Moḩammad Ḩājjī) is a village in Salehabad Rural District of the Central District in Salehabad County, Razavi Khorasan province, Iran.

== Demographics ==
=== Population ===
At the time of the 2006 National Census, the village's population was 95 in 23 households, when it was in the former Salehabad District of Torbat-e Jam County. The following census in 2011 counted 85 people in 23 households. The 2016 census measured the population of the village as 47 people in 16 households.

In 2018, the district was separated from the county in the establishment of Salehabad County, and the rural district was transferred to the new Central District.
