= Mehdiabad, Salehabad =

Village in Razavi Khorasan province, Iran

Mehdiabad Persian: مهدي اباد
- Village
- Location within Iran
- Coordinates: 35°40′36″N 61°04′11″E
- Country: Iran
- Province: Razavi Khorasan
- County: Salehabad
- District: Central
- Rural District: Salehabad

Population (2016)
  - Total: 209
- Time zone: UTC+3:30 (IRST)

Mehdiabad (Persian: مهدي اباد) (Note: Also romanized as Mehdīābād; formerly known as Kārīz Dīvāneh (كاريزديوانه)) is a village in Salehabad Rural District of the Central District in Salehabad County, Razavi Khorasan province, Iran.

== Demographics ==
=== Population ===
At the time of the 2006 National Census, the village's population was 317 in 85 households, when it was in the former Salehabad District of Torbat-e Jam County. The following census in 2011 counted 289 people in 81 households. The 2016 census measured the population of the village as 209 people in 58 households.

In 2018, the district was separated from the county in the establishment of Salehabad County, and the rural district was transferred to the new Central District.
