= Saqar Cheshmeh-ye Sofla =

Village in Razavi Khorasan province, Iran

Saqar Cheshmeh-ye Sofla Persian: سقرچشمه سفلي
- Village
- Location within Iran
- Coordinates: 35°40′52″N 61°07′43″E
- Country: Iran
- Province: Razavi Khorasan
- County: Salehabad
- District: Central
- Rural District: Salehabad

Population (2016)
  - Total: 112
- Time zone: UTC+3:30 (IRST)

Saqar Cheshmeh-ye Sofla (Persian: سقرچشمه سفلي) (Note: Also romanized as Şaqar Cheshmeh-ye Soflá; also known as Şaghar Cheshmeh-ye Soflá and Saqar Cheshmeh-ye Pā’īn) is a village in Salehabad Rural District of the Central District in Salehabad County, Razavi Khorasan province, Iran.

== Demographics ==
=== Population ===
At the time of the 2006 National Census, the village's population was 93 in 17 households, when it was in the former Salehabad District of Torbat-e Jam County. The following census in 2011 counted 95 people in 20 households. The 2016 census measured the population of the village as 112 people in 28 households.

In 2018, the district was separated from the county in the establishment of Salehabad County, and the rural district was transferred to the new Central District.
