= Shurab, Salehabad =

Village in Razavi Khorasan province, Iran

Shurab Persian: شوراب
- Village
- Location within Iran
- Coordinates: 35°55′19″N 60°35′59″E
- Country: Iran
- Province: Razavi Khorasan
- County: Salehabad
- District: Central
- Rural District: Bagh-e Keshmir

Population (2016)
  - Total: 90
- Time zone: UTC+3:30 (IRST)

Shurab (Persian: شوراب) (Note: Also romanized as Shūr Āb and Shūrāb) is a village in Bagh-e Keshmir Rural District of the Central District in Salehabad County, Razavi Khorasan province, Iran.

== Demographics ==
=== Population ===
At the time of the 2006 National Census, the village's population was 70 in 15 households, when it was in the former Salehabad District of Torbat-e Jam County. The following census in 2011 counted 67 people in 17 households. The 2016 census measured the population of the village as 90 people in 24 households.

In 2018, the district was separated from the county in the establishment of Salehabad County, and the rural district was transferred to the new Central District.
