= Mamiz Ab =

Village in Razavi Khorasan province, Iran

Mamiz Ab Persian: مميزاب
- Village
- Location within Iran
- Coordinates: 35°51′57″N 60°48′10″E
- Country: Iran
- Province: Razavi Khorasan
- County: Salehabad
- District: Central
- Rural District: Bagh-e Keshmir

Population (2016)
  - Total: 1,048
- Time zone: UTC+3:30 (IRST)

Mamiz Ab (Persian: مميزاب) (Note: Also romanized as Mamīz Āb; also known as Mahīz Āb, Mamīzā, Mazmāgerd, and Mazmāgird) is a village in Bagh-e Keshmir Rural District of the Central District in Salehabad County, Razavi Khorasan province, Iran.

== Demographics ==
=== Population ===
At the time of the 2006 National Census, the village's population was 982 in 216 households, when it was in the former Salehabad District of Torbat-e Jam County. The following census in 2011 counted 1,057 people in 262 households. The 2016 census measured the population of the village as 1,048 people in 305 households.

In 2018, the district was separated from the county in the establishment of Salehabad County, and the rural district was transferred to the new Central District.
