= Ebrahim Bay =

Village in Razavi Khorasan province, Iran

Ebrahim Bay Persian: ابراهيم باي
- Village
- Location within Iran
- Coordinates: 35°35′46″N 61°12′32″E
- Country: Iran
- Province: Razavi Khorasan
- County: Salehabad
- District: Jannatabad
- Rural District: Jannatabad

Population (2016)
  - Total: 89
- Time zone: UTC+3:30 (IRST)

Ebrahim Bay (Persian: ابراهيم باي) (Note: Also romanized as Ebrāhīm Bāy) is a village in Jannatabad Rural District of Jannatabad District in Salehabad County, Razavi Khorasan province, Iran.

== Demographics ==
=== Population ===
At the time of the 2006 National Census, the village's population was 81 in 21 households, when it was in the former Salehabad District of Torbat-e Jam County. The following census in 2011 counted 132 people in 35 households. The 2016 census measured the population of the village as 89 people in 26 households.

In 2018, the district was separated from the county in the establishment of Salehabad County, and the rural district was transferred to the new Jannatabad District.
