= Sangab, Razavi Khorasan =

Village in Razavi Khorasan province, Iran

Sangab Persian: سنگ اب
- Village
- Location within Iran
- Coordinates: 35°43′49″N 61°08′08″E
- Country: Iran
- Province: Razavi Khorasan
- County: Salehabad
- District: Central
- Rural District: Salehabad

Population (2016)
  - Total: 154
- Time zone: UTC+3:30 (IRST)

Sangab (Persian: سنگ اب) (Note: Also romanized as Sangāb) is a village in Salehabad Rural District of the Central District in Salehabad County, Razavi Khorasan province, Iran.

== Demographics ==
=== Population ===
At the time of the 2006 National Census, the village's population was 176 in 36 households, when it was in the former Salehabad District of Torbat-e Jam County. The following census in 2011 counted 189 people in 46 households. The 2016 census measured the population of the village as 154 people in 40 households.

In 2018, the district was separated from the county in the establishment of Salehabad County, and the rural district was transferred to the new Central District.
