= Yekkeh Bagh, Salehabad =

Village in Razavi Khorasan province, Iran

Yekkeh Bagh Persian: يكه باغ
- Village
- Location within Iran
- Coordinates: 35°51′10″N 60°42′30″E
- Country: Iran
- Province: Razavi Khorasan
- County: Salehabad
- District: Central
- Rural District: Bagh-e Keshmir

Population (2016)
  - Total: 136
- Time zone: UTC+3:30 (IRST)

Yekkeh Bagh (Persian: يكه باغ) (Note: Also romanized as Yakkeh Bāgh and Yekkeh Bāgh; also known as Yaka Bāgh and Yekā Bak) is a village in Bagh-e Keshmir Rural District of the Central District in Salehabad County, Razavi Khorasan province, Iran.

== Demographics ==
=== Population ===
At the time of the 2006 National Census, the village's population was 163 in 39 households, when it was in the former Salehabad District of Torbat-e Jam County. The following census in 2011 counted 124 people in 36 households. The 2016 census measured the population of the village as 136 people in 40 households.

In 2018, the district was separated from the county in the establishment of Salehabad County, and the rural district was transferred to the new Central District.
