= Kalateh-ye Ghows ol Din =

Village in Razavi Khorasan province, Iran

Kalateh-ye Ghows ol Din Persian: كلاته غوث الدين
- Village
- Location within Iran
- Country: Iran
- Province: Razavi Khorasan
- County: Salehabad
- District: Central
- Rural District: Salehabad

Population (2016)
  - Total: 0
- Time zone: UTC+3:30 (IRST)

Kalateh-ye Ghows ol Din (Persian: كلاته غوث الدين) (Note: Also romanized as Kalāteh-ye Ghows ol Dīn; also known as Kalāteh-ye ʿAbd ol Raḥman (كلاته عبدالرحمن), Kalateh-ye Gows ol Din, Kalāteh-ye Gows ol Dīn, and Kalāteh-ye Qows od Dīn) is a village in Salehabad Rural District of the Central District in Salehabad County, Razavi Khorasan province, Iran.

== Demographics ==
=== Population ===
At the time of the 2006 National Census, the village's population was 76 in 16 households, when it was in the former Salehabad District of Torbat-e Jam County. The village did not appear in the following census of 2011. The 2016 census measured the population of the village as zero.

In 2018, the district was separated from the county in the establishment of Salehabad County, and the rural district was transferred to the new Central District.
