= Bagh-e Keshmir-e Olya =

Village in Razavi Khorasan province, Iran

Bagh-e Keshmir-e Olya Persian: باغ كشميرعليا
- Village
- Location within Iran
- Coordinates: 35°45′55″N 60°38′57″E
- Country: Iran
- Province: Razavi Khorasan
- County: Salehabad
- District: Central
- Rural District: Bagh-e Keshmir

Population (2016)
  - Total: 1,181
- Time zone: UTC+3:30 (IRST)

Bagh-e Keshmir-e Olya (Persian: باغ كشميرعليا) (Note: Also romanized as Bāgh-e Keshmīr-e ‘Olyā; also known as Bāgh Keshmīr, Bāgh-e Keshmīr, and Bāgh-e Keshmīr-e Bālā) is a village in Bagh-e Keshmir Rural District of the Central District in Salehabad County, Razavi Khorasan province, Iran.

== Demographics ==
=== Population ===
At the time of the 2006 National Census, the village's population was 1,041 in 241 households, when it was in the former Salehabad District of Torbat-e Jam County. The following census in 2011 counted 1,157 people in 309 households. The 2016 census measured the population of the village as 1,181 people in 329 households.

In 2018, the district was separated from the county in the establishment of Salehabad County, and the rural district was transferred to the new Central District.
