= Jafariyeh, Razavi Khorasan =

Village in Razavi Khorasan province, Iran

Jafariyeh Persian: جعفريه
- Village
- Location within Iran
- Coordinates: 35°39′45″N 60°58′08″E
- Country: Iran
- Province: Razavi Khorasan
- County: Salehabad
- District: Central
- Rural District: Qaleh Hamam

Population (2016)
  - Total: 474
- Time zone: UTC+3:30 (IRST)

Jafariyeh (Persian: جعفريه) (Note: Also romanized as Jaʿfarīyeh; formerly known as Kārīz-e ‘Omar (كاريزعمر); also known as Kahrīz-e ‘Omar and Karez-i-Umar) is a village in, and the capital of, Qaleh Hamam Rural District in the Central District of Salehabad County, Razavi Khorasan province, Iran.

== Demographics ==
=== Population ===
At the time of the 2006 National Census, the village's population was 545 in 142 households, when it was in the former Salehabad District of Torbat-e Jam County. The following census in 2011 counted 533 people in 150 households. The 2016 census measured the population of the village as 474 people in 145 households.

In 2018, the district was separated from the county in the establishment of Salehabad County, and the rural district was transferred to the new Central District.
