= Cheshmeh Zard, Razavi Khorasan =

Village in Razavi Khorasan province, Iran

Cheshmeh Zard Persian: چشمه زرد
- Village
- Location within Iran
- Coordinates: 35°53′13″N 60°55′22″E
- Country: Iran
- Province: Razavi Khorasan
- County: Salehabad
- District: Central
- Rural District: Bagh-e Keshmir

Population (2016)
  - Total: 386
- Time zone: UTC+3:30 (IRST)

Cheshmeh Zard (Persian: چشمه زرد) is a village in Bagh-e Keshmir Rural District of the Central District in Salehabad County, Razavi Khorasan province, Iran.

== Demographics ==
=== Population ===
At the time of the 2006 National Census, the village's population was 330 in 65 households, when it was in the former Salehabad District of Torbat-e Jam County. The following census in 2011 counted 331 people in 73 households. The 2016 census measured the population of the village as 386 people in 96 households.

In 2018, the district was separated from the county in the establishment of Salehabad County, and the rural district was transferred to the new Central District.
