= Kariz Kohandel =

Village in Razavi Khorasan province, Iran

Kariz Kohandel Persian: كاريز كهندل
- Village
- Location within Iran
- Coordinates: 35°32′17″N 61°07′42″E
- Country: Iran
- Province: Razavi Khorasan
- County: Salehabad
- District: Jannatabad
- Rural District: Ostay

Population (2016)
  - Total: 1,598
- Time zone: UTC+3:30 (IRST)

Kariz Kohandel (Persian: كاريز كهندل) (Note: Also romanized as Kārīz Kohandel; also known as Kārīz Kondel (كاريز كندل)) is a village in, and the capital of, Ostay Rural District in Jannatabad District of Salehabad County, Razavi Khorasan province, Iran.

== Demographics ==
=== Population ===
At the time of the 2006 National Census, the village's population was 1,593 in 338 households, when it was in Jannatabad Rural District of the former Salehabad District in Torbat-e Jam County. The following census in 2011 counted 1,568 people in 372 households. The 2016 census measured the population of the village as 1,598 people in 395 households, the most populous in its rural district.

In 2018, the district was separated from the county in the establishment of Salehabad County. The rural district was transferred to the new Jannatabad District, and Kariz Kohandel was transferred to Ostay Rural District created in the same district.
