= Kalateh-ye Abu ol Qasem =

Village in Razavi Khorasan province, Iran

Kalateh-ye Abu ol Qasem Persian: كلاته ابوالقاسم
- Village
- Location within Iran
- Country: Iran
- Province: Razavi Khorasan
- County: Salehabad
- District: Central
- Rural District: Salehabad

Population (2016)
  - Total: 517
- Time zone: UTC+3:30 (IRST)

Kalateh-ye Abu ol Qasem (Persian: كلاته ابوالقاسم) (Note: Also romanized as Kalāteh-ye Abū ol Qāsem; also known as Kalāteh-ye Ab ol Qāsem) is a village in Salehabad Rural District of the Central District in Salehabad County, Razavi Khorasan province, Iran.

== Demographics ==
=== Population ===
At the time of the 2006 National Census, the village's population was 413 in 92 households, when it was in the former Salehabad District of Torbat-e Jam County. The following census in 2011 counted 457 people in 117 households. The 2016 census measured the population of the village as 517 people in 137 households.

In 2018, the district was separated from the county in the establishment of Salehabad County, and the rural district was transferred to the new Central District.
