= Tut-e Safar =

Village in Razavi Khorasan province, Iran

Tut-e Safar Persian: توت صفر
- Village
- Location within Iran
- Coordinates: 35°30′10″N 61°05′36″E
- Country: Iran
- Province: Razavi Khorasan
- County: Salehabad
- District: Jannatabad
- Rural District: Ostay

Population (2016)
  - Total: 118
- Time zone: UTC+3:30 (IRST)

Tut-e Safar (Persian: توت صفر) (Note: Also romanized as Tūt-e Şafar) is a village in Ostay Rural District of Jannatabad District in Salehabad County, Razavi Khorasan province, Iran.

== Demographics ==
=== Population ===
At the time of the 2006 National Census, the village's population was 168 in 36 households, when it was in Jannatabad Rural District of the former Salehabad District in Torbat-e Jam County. The following census in 2011 counted 157 people in 36 households. The 2016 census measured the population of the village as 118 people in 27 households.

In 2018, the district was separated from the county in the establishment of Salehabad County. The rural district was transferred to the new Jannatabad District, and Tut-e Safar was transferred to Ostay Rural District created in the same district.
