= Falizak =

Village in Razavi Khorasan province, Iran

Falizak Persian: فاليزك
- Village
- Location within Iran
- Coordinates: 35°47′04″N 60°46′51″E
- Country: Iran
- Province: Razavi Khorasan
- County: Salehabad
- District: Central
- Rural District: Bagh-e Keshmir

Population (2016)
  - Total: 416
- Time zone: UTC+3:30 (IRST)

Falizak (Persian: فاليزك) (Note: Also romanized as Fālīzak; also known as Pālīzak (پاليزك)) is a village in Bagh-e Keshmir Rural District of the Central District in Salehabad County, Razavi Khorasan province, Iran.

== Demographics ==
=== Population ===
At the time of the 2006 National Census, the village's population was 430 in 106 households, when it was in the former Salehabad District of Torbat-e Jam County. The following census in 2011 counted 408 people in 97 households. The 2016 census measured the population of the village as 416 people in 112 households.

In 2018, the district was separated from the county in the establishment of Salehabad County, and the rural district was transferred to the new Central District.
