= Esmailabad, Salehabad =

Village in Razavi Khorasan province, Iran

Esmailabad Persian: اسماعيل اباد
- Village
- Location within Iran
- Coordinates: 35°43′26″N 61°03′58″E
- Country: Iran
- Province: Razavi Khorasan
- County: Salehabad
- District: Central
- Rural District: Salehabad

Population (2016)
  - Total: 455
- Time zone: UTC+3:30 (IRST)

Esmailabad (Persian: اسماعيل اباد) (Note: Also romanized as Esmā‘īlābād) is a village in, and the capital of, Salehabad Rural District in the Central District of Salehabad County, Razavi Khorasan province, Iran.

== Demographics ==
=== Population ===
At the time of the 2006 National Census, the village's population was 450 in 89 households, when it was in the former Salehabad District of Torbat-e Jam County. The following census in 2011 counted 430 people in 104 households. The 2016 census measured the population of the village as 455 people in 112 households.

In 2018, the district was separated from the county in the establishment of Salehabad County, and the rural district was transferred to the new Central District.
