= Gur-e Khar =

Gur-e Khar or Gur Khar or Gur-i-Khar (Persian: گورخر) may refer to:

- Gur-e Khar, Fars
- Gur Khar, Khuzestan
- Gurkhar
