= Padeh-ye Jan Morad =

Village in Razavi Khorasan province, Iran

Padeh-ye Jan Morad Persian: پده جان مراد
- Village
- Location within Iran
- Coordinates: 35°35′25″N 60°51′28″E
- Country: Iran
- Province: Razavi Khorasan
- County: Salehabad
- District: Central
- Rural District: Qaleh Hamam

Population (2016)
  - Total: 484
- Time zone: UTC+3:30 (IRST)

Padeh-ye Jan Morad (Persian: پده جان مراد) (Note: Also romanized as Padeh-ye Jān Morād) is a village in Qaleh Hamam Rural District of the Central District in Salehabad County, Razavi Khorasan province, Iran.

== Demographics ==
=== Population ===
At the time of the 2006 National Census, the village's population was 426 in 86 households, when it was in the former Salehabad District of Torbat-e Jam County. The following census in 2011 counted 534 people in 123 households. The 2016 census measured the population of the village as 484 people in 122 households.

In 2018, the district was separated from the county in the establishment of Salehabad County, and the rural district was transferred to the new Central District.
