= Sar Ab, Salehabad =

Village in Razavi Khorasan province, Iran

Sar Ab Persian: سراب
- Village
- Location within Iran
- Coordinates: 35°40′52″N 60°51′36″E
- Country: Iran
- Province: Razavi Khorasan
- County: Salehabad
- District: Central
- Rural District: Qaleh Hamam

Population (2016)
  - Total: 114
- Time zone: UTC+3:30 (IRST)

Sar Ab (Persian: سراب) (Note: Also romanized as Sar Āb) is a village in Qaleh Hamam Rural District of the Central District in Salehabad County, Razavi Khorasan province, Iran.

== Demographics ==
=== Population ===
At the time of the 2006 National Census, the village's population was 122 in 30 households, when it was in the former Salehabad District of Torbat-e Jam County. The following census in 2011 counted 106 people in 39 households. The 2016 census measured the population of the village as 114 people in 38 households.

In 2018, the district was separated from the county in the establishment of Salehabad County, and the rural district was transferred to the new Central District.
