= Hoseynabad, Salehabad =

Village in Razavi Khorasan province, Iran

Hoseynabad Persian: حسين اباد
- Village
- Location within Iran
- Country: Iran
- Province: Razavi Khorasan
- County: Salehabad
- District: Central
- Rural District: Salehabad

Population (2016)
  - Total: 350
- Time zone: UTC+3:30 (IRST)

Hoseynabad (Persian: حسين اباد) (Note: Also romanized as Ḩoseynābād) is a village in Salehabad Rural District of the Central District in Salehabad County, Razavi Khorasan province, Iran.

== Demographics ==
=== Population ===
At the time of the 2006 National Census, the village's population was 382 in 95 households, when it was in the former Salehabad District of Torbat-e Jam County. The following census in 2011 counted 354 people in 79 households. The 2016 census measured the population of the village as 350 people in 93 households.

In 2018, the district was separated from the county in the establishment of Salehabad County, and the rural district was transferred to the new Central District.
