= Derakht-e Bid, Salehabad =

Village in Razavi Khorasan province, Iran

Derakht-e Bid Persian: درخت بيد
- Village
- Location within Iran
- Coordinates: 35°53′10″N 60°36′14″E
- Country: Iran
- Province: Razavi Khorasan
- County: Salehabad
- District: Central
- Rural District: Bagh-e Keshmir

Population (2016)
  - Total: 452
- Time zone: UTC+3:30 (IRST)

Derakht-e Bid (Persian: درخت بيد) (Note: Also romanized as Derakht-e Bīd) is a village in Bagh-e Keshmir Rural District of the Central District in Salehabad County, Razavi Khorasan province, Iran.

== Demographics ==
=== Population ===
At the time of the 2006 National Census, the village's population was 400 in 82 households, when it was in the former Salehabad District of Torbat-e Jam County. The following census in 2011 counted 373 people in 100 households. The 2016 census measured the population of the village as 452 people in 125 households.

In 2018, the district was separated from the county in the establishment of Salehabad County, and the rural district was transferred to the new Central District.
