= Qosheh Tut =

Village in Razavi Khorasan province, Iran

Qosheh Tut Persian: قشه توت
- Village
- Location within Iran
- Coordinates: 35°39′17″N 61°00′22″E
- Country: Iran
- Province: Razavi Khorasan
- County: Salehabad
- District: Central
- Rural District: Qaleh Hamam

Population (2016)
  - Total: 578
- Time zone: UTC+3:30 (IRST)

Qosheh Tut (Persian: قشه توت) (Note: Also romanized as Qosheh Tūt) is a village in Qaleh Hamam Rural District of the Central District in Salehabad County, Razavi Khorasan province, Iran.

== Demographics ==
=== Population ===
At the time of the 2006 National Census, the village's population was 662 in 161 households, when it was in the former Salehabad District of Torbat-e Jam County. The following census in 2011 counted 683 people in 185 households. The 2016 census measured the population of the village as 578 people in 154 households.

In 2018, the district was separated from the county in the establishment of Salehabad County, and the rural district was transferred to the new Central District.
