= Mikhak, Salehabad =

Village in Razavi Khorasan province, Iran

Mikhak Persian: ميخك
- Village
- Location within Iran
- Coordinates: 35°43′33″N 60°42′58″E
- Country: Iran
- Province: Razavi Khorasan
- County: Salehabad
- District: Central
- Rural District: Qaleh Hamam

Population (2016)
  - Total: 440
- Time zone: UTC+3:30 (IRST)

Mikhak (Persian: ميخك) (Note: Also romanized as Mīkhak; also known as Mīkh-e Khar (ميخ خر)) is a village in Qaleh Hamam Rural District of the Central District in Salehabad County, Razavi Khorasan province, Iran.

== Demographics ==
=== Population ===
At the time of the 2006 National Census, the village's population was 385 in 70 households, when it was in the former Salehabad District of Torbat-e Jam County. The following census in 2011 counted 407 people in 90 households. The 2016 census measured the population of the village as 440 people in 113 households.

In 2018, the district was separated from the county in the establishment of Salehabad County, and the rural district was transferred to the new Central District.
