= Kalateh-ye Samad =

Village in Razavi Khorasan province, Iran

Kalateh-ye Samad Persian: كلاته صمد
- Village
- Location within Iran
- Coordinates: 35°37′38″N 61°12′48″E
- Country: Iran
- Province: Razavi Khorasan
- County: Salehabad
- District: Jannatabad
- Rural District: Jannatabad

Population (2016)
  - Total: 242
- Time zone: UTC+3:30 (IRST)

Kalateh-ye Samad (Persian: كلاته صمد) (Note: Also romanized as Kalāteh Şamad and Kalāteh-ye Şamad; formerly known as Kalateh-ye Samad Khan (كلاته صمدخان), also romanized as Kalāteh Şamad Khān and Kalāteh-ye Şamad Khān) is a village in Jannatabad Rural District of Jannatabad District in Salehabad County, Razavi Khorasan province, Iran.

== Demographics ==
=== Population ===
At the time of the 2006 National Census, the village's population was 302 in 56 households, when it was in the former Salehabad District of Torbat-e Jam County. The following census in 2011 counted 272 people in 65 households. The 2016 census measured the population of the village as 242 people in 53 households.

In 2018, the district was separated from the county in the establishment of Salehabad County, and the rural district was transferred to the new Jannatabad District.
