= Derakht-e Tut, Razavi Khorasan =

Village in Razavi Khorasan province, Iran

Derakht-e Tut Persian: درخت توت
- Village
- Location within Iran
- Coordinates: 35°45′06″N 61°06′33″E
- Country: Iran
- Province: Razavi Khorasan
- County: Salehabad
- District: Central
- Rural District: Salehabad

Population (2016)
  - Total: 496
- Time zone: UTC+3:30 (IRST)

Derakht-e Tut (Persian: درخت توت) (Note: Also romanized as Derakht Tūt and Derakht-e Tūt) is a village in Salehabad Rural District of the Central District in Salehabad County, Razavi Khorasan province, Iran.

== Demographics ==
=== Population ===
At the time of the 2006 National Census, the village's population was 453 in 94 households, when it was in the former Salehabad District of Torbat-e Jam County. The following census in 2011 counted 452 people in 114 households. The 2016 census measured the population of the village as 496 people in 142 households.

In 2018, the district was separated from the county in the establishment of Salehabad County, and the rural district was transferred to the new Central District.
