= Pir Anjiri =

Village in Razavi Khorasan province, Iran

Pir Anjiri Persian: پيرانجيري
- Village
- Location within Iran
- Coordinates: 35°55′10″N 61°09′32″E
- Country: Iran
- Province: Razavi Khorasan
- County: Salehabad
- District: Central
- Rural District: Salehabad

Population (2016)
  - Total: 35
- Time zone: UTC+3:30 (IRST)

Pir Anjiri (Persian: پيرانجيري) (Note: Also romanized as Pīr Anjīrī; also known as Pīr Anjīr) is a village in Salehabad Rural District of the Central District in Salehabad County, Razavi Khorasan province, Iran.

== Demographics ==
=== Population ===
At the time of the 2006 National Census, the village's population was 56 in 12 households, when it was in the former Salehabad District of Torbat-e Jam County. The following census in 2011 counted 38 people in 10 households. The 2016 census measured the population of the village as 35 people in eight households.

In 2018, the district was separated from the county in the establishment of Salehabad County, and the rural district was transferred to the new Central District.
