= Karizak-e Yaqubi =

Village in Razavi Khorasan province, Iran

Karizak-e Yaqubi Persian: كاريزك يعقوبي
- Village
- Location within Iran
- Coordinates: 35°49′29″N 61°01′20″E
- Country: Iran
- Province: Razavi Khorasan
- County: Salehabad
- District: Central
- Rural District: Bagh-e Keshmir

Population (2016)
  - Total: 206
- Time zone: UTC+3:30 (IRST)

Karizak-e Yaqubi (Persian: كاريزك يعقوبني) (Note: Also romanized as Kārīzak-e Yaʿqūbī; formerly known as Karizak-e Yaqubkhani (كاريزك يعقوبخاني), also romanized as Kārīzak-e Yaʿqūbkhānī; also known as Kārīzak) is a village in Bagh-e Keshmir Rural District of the Central District in Salehabad County, Razavi Khorasan province, Iran.

== Demographics ==
=== Population ===
At the time of the 2006 National Census, the village's population was 288 in 63 households, when it was in the former Salehabad District of Torbat-e Jam County. The following census in 2011 counted 233 people in 58 households. The 2016 census measured the population of the village as 206 people in 51 households.

In 2018, the district was separated from the county in the establishment of Salehabad County, and the rural district was transferred to the new Central District.
