= Cheshmeh Teymuri =

Village in Razavi Khorasan province, Iran

Cheshmeh Teymuri Persian: چشمه تيموري
- Village
- Location within Iran
- Coordinates: 35°47′02″N 60°56′32″E
- Country: Iran
- Province: Razavi Khorasan
- County: Salehabad
- District: Central
- Rural District: Salehabad

Population (2016)
  - Total: 214
- Time zone: UTC+3:30 (IRST)

Cheshmeh Teymuri (Persian: چشمه تيموري) (Note: Also romanized as Chashmeh-i-Timūri, Cheshmeh Teimoori, Cheshmeh Teymūrī, and Cheshmeh-ye Teymūrī) is a village in Salehabad Rural District of the Central District in Salehabad County, Razavi Khorasan province, Iran.

== Demographics ==
=== Population ===
At the time of the 2006 National Census, the village's population was 238 in 56 households, when it was in the former Salehabad District of Torbat-e Jam County. The following census in 2011 counted 244 people in 62 households. The 2016 census measured the population of the village as 214 people in 55 households.

In 2018, the district was separated from the county in the establishment of Salehabad County, and the rural district was transferred to the new Central District.
