= Tut, Iran =

Tut (Persian: توت), in Iran, may refer to the following villages:

- Tut, Lorestan
- Tut, Markazi
- Tut, Razavi Khorasan
- Tut, Mehrestan, Sistan and Baluchestan Province
- Tut, South Khorasan
- Tut, Yazd

== See also ==
- Tut-e Olya, Khuzestan Province
- Tut-e Sofla, Khuzestan Province
- Tut-e Safar, Razavi Khorasan Province
- Tut-e Seyyed Mohammad, Razavi Khorasan Province
