= Kalateh-ye Baqi =

Village in Razavi Khorasan province, Iran

Kalateh-ye Baqi Persian: كلاته باقي
- Village
- Location within Iran
- Coordinates: 35°37′17″N 61°10′45″E
- Country: Iran
- Province: Razavi Khorasan
- County: Salehabad
- District: Jannatabad
- Rural District: Jannatabad

Population (2016)
  - Total: 217
- Time zone: UTC+3:30 (IRST)

Kalateh-ye Baqi (Persian: كلاته باقي) (Note: Also romanized as Kalāteh-ye Bāqī; formerly known as Kalateh-ye Baqi Khan (كلاته باقي خان), also romanized as Kalāteh-ye Bāqī Khān; also known as Kalāteh-ye Bāghī Khān (کلاته باغی خان) and Bāqī Khān) is a village in Jannatabad Rural District of Jannatabad District in Salehabad County, Razavi Khorasan province, Iran.

== Demographics ==
=== Population ===
At the time of the 2006 National Census, the village's population was 269 in 63 households, when it was in the former Salehabad District of Torbat-e Jam County. The following census in 2011 counted 244 people in 71 households. The 2016 census measured the population of the village as 217 people in 61 households.

In 2018, the district was separated from the county in the establishment of Salehabad County, and the rural district was transferred to the new Jannatabad District.
