= Cheshmeh-ye Abdal Karim =

Village in Razavi Khorasan province, Iran

Cheshmeh-ye Abdal Karim Persian: چشمه عبدالكريم
- Village
- Location within Iran
- Coordinates: 35°55′16″N 60°41′12″E
- Country: Iran
- Province: Razavi Khorasan
- County: Salehabad
- District: Central
- Rural District: Bagh-e Keshmir

Population (2016)
  - Total: 123
- Time zone: UTC+3:30 (IRST)

Cheshmeh-ye Abdal Karim (Persian: چشمه عبدالكريم) (Note: Also romanized as Cheshmeh-ye ʿAbdāl Karīm) is a village in Bagh-e Keshmir Rural District of the Central District in Salehabad County, Razavi Khorasan province, Iran.

== Demographics ==
=== Population ===
At the time of the 2006 National Census, the village's population was 156 in 35 households, when it was in the former Salehabad District of Torbat-e Jam County. The following census in 2011 counted 164 people in 41 households. The 2016 census measured the population of the village as 123 people in 39 households.

In 2018, the district was separated from the county in the establishment of Salehabad County, and the rural district was transferred to the new Central District.
