= Qaleh Hammam-e Hajji Rasul =

Village in Razavi Khorasan province, Iran

Qaleh Hammam-e Hajji Rasul Persian: قلعه حمام حاجي رسول
- Village
- Location within Iran
- Coordinates: 35°48′06″N 60°45′19″E
- Country: Iran
- Province: Razavi Khorasan
- County: Salehabad
- District: Central
- Rural District: Bagh-e Keshmir

Population (2016)
  - Total: 290
- Time zone: UTC+3:30 (IRST)

Qaleh Hammam-e Hajji Rasul (Persian: قلعه حمام حاجي رسول) (Note: Also romanized as Qal‘eh Ḩammām-e Ḩājjī Rasūl; also known as Hamāmi, Qal‘eh Ḩammām, Qal‘eh Ḩammām-e Ḩājj Rasūl (قلعه حمام حاج رسول), Qal‘eh-ye Ḩammām, and Qal‘eh-ye Ḩammām Rasūl) is a village in Bagh-e Keshmir Rural District of the Central District in Salehabad County, Razavi Khorasan province, Iran.

== Demographics ==
=== Population ===
At the time of the 2006 National Census, the village's population was 330 in 66 households, when it was in the former Salehabad District of Torbat-e Jam County. The following census in 2011 counted 299 people in 76 households. The 2016 census measured the population of the village as 290 people in 74 households.

In 2018, the district was separated from the county in the establishment of Salehabad County, and the rural district was transferred to the new Central District.
