= Kheyrabad, Salehabad =

Village in Razavi Khorasan province, Iran

Kheyrabad Persian: خير آباد
- Village
- Location within Iran
- Coordinates: 35°55′12″N 61°04′11″E
- Country: Iran
- Province: Razavi Khorasan
- County: Salehabad
- District: Central
- Rural District: Salehabad

Population (2016)
  - Total: 113
- Time zone: UTC+3:30 (IRST)

Kheyrabad (Persian: خير آباد) (Note: Also romanized as Kheyrābād) is a village in Salehabad Rural District of the Central District in Salehabad County, Razavi Khorasan province, Iran.

== Demographics ==
=== Population ===
At the time of the 2006 National Census, the village's population was 163 in 28 households, when it was in the former Salehabad District of Torbat-e Jam County. The following census in 2011 counted 144 people in 30 households. The 2016 census measured the population of the village as 113 people in 24 households.

In 2018, the district was separated from the county in the establishment of Salehabad County, and the rural district was transferred to the new Central District.
