= Cheshmeh-ye Gol, Salehabad =

Village in Razavi Khorasan province, Iran

Cheshmeh-ye Gol Persian: چشمه گل
- Village
- Location within Iran
- Coordinates: 35°56′21″N 60°39′29″E
- Country: Iran
- Province: Razavi Khorasan
- County: Salehabad
- District: Central
- Rural District: Bagh-e Keshmir

Population (2016)
  - Total: 73
- Time zone: UTC+3:30 (IRST)

Cheshmeh-ye Gol (Persian: چشمه گل) is a village in Bagh-e Keshmir Rural District of the Central District in Salehabad County, Razavi Khorasan province, Iran.

== Demographics ==
=== Population ===
At the time of the 2006 National Census, the village's population was 113 in 24 households, when it was in the former Salehabad District of Torbat-e Jam County. The following census in 2011 counted 96 people in 29 households. The 2016 census measured the population of the village as 73 people in 25 households.

In 2018, the district was separated from the county in the establishment of Salehabad County, and the rural district was transferred to the new Central District.
