= Cheshmeh-ye Azad =

Village in Razavi Khorasan province, Iran

Cheshmeh-ye Azad Persian: چشمه ازاد
- Village
- Location within Iran
- Coordinates: 35°53′16″N 60°57′00″E
- Country: Iran
- Province: Razavi Khorasan
- County: Salehabad
- District: Central
- Rural District: Bagh-e Keshmir

Population (2016)
  - Total: 320
- Time zone: UTC+3:30 (IRST)

Cheshmeh-ye Azad (Persian: چشمه ازاد) (Note: Also romanized as Cheshmeh-ye Āzād) is a village in Bagh-e Keshmir Rural District of the Central District in Salehabad County, Razavi Khorasan province, Iran.

== Demographics ==
=== Population ===
At the time of the 2006 National Census, the village's population was 240 in 58 households, when it was in the former Salehabad District of Torbat-e Jam County. The following census in 2011 counted 285 people in 72 households. The 2016 census measured the population of the village as 320 people in 87 households.

In 2018, the district was separated from the county in the establishment of Salehabad County, and the rural district was transferred to the new Central District.
