= Kalateh-ye Hamid =

Village in Razavi Khorasan province, Iran

Kalateh-ye Hamid Persian: كلاته حميد
- Village
- Location within Iran
- Coordinates: 35°35′09″N 61°13′51″E
- Country: Iran
- Province: Razavi Khorasan
- County: Salehabad
- District: Jannatabad
- Rural District: Jannatabad

Population (2016)
  - Total: 126
- Time zone: UTC+3:30 (IRST)

Kalateh-ye Hamid (Persian: كلاته حميد) (Note: Also romanized as Kalāteh-ye Ḩamīd; also known as Kalāteh Khān (كلاته خان) and Kalāteh-ye Khān) is a village in Jannatabad Rural District of Jannatabad District in Salehabad County, Razavi Khorasan province, Iran.

== Demographics ==
=== Population ===
At the time of the 2006 National Census, the village's population was 224 in 40 households, when it was in the former Salehabad District of Torbat-e Jam County. The following census in 2011 counted 251 people in 53 households. The 2016 census measured the population of the village as 126 people in 32 households.

In 2018, the district was separated from the county in the establishment of Salehabad County, and the rural district was transferred to the new Jannatabad District.
