= Emam Qaleh =

Emam Qaleh (Persian: امام قلعه) may refer to:

- Emam Qaleh, Mashhad
- Emam Qaleh, Torbat-e Jam
