= Naqdali-ye Olya =

Village in Razavi Khorasan province, Iran

Naqdali-ye Olya Persian: نقدعلي عليا
- Village
- Location within Iran
- Coordinates: 35°37′41″N 60°46′32″E
- Country: Iran
- Province: Razavi Khorasan
- County: Salehabad
- District: Central
- Rural District: Qaleh Hamam

Population (2016)
  - Total: 368
- Time zone: UTC+3:30 (IRST)

Naqdali-ye Olya (Persian: نقدعلي عليا) (Note: Also romanized as Naqd‘alī-ye ‘Olyā; also known as Naqd‘alī-ye Bālā) is a village in Qaleh Hamam Rural District of the Central District in Salehabad County, Razavi Khorasan province, Iran.

== Demographics ==
=== Population ===
At the time of the 2006 National Census, the village's population was 328 in 65 households, when it was in the former Salehabad District of Torbat-e Jam County. The following census in 2011 counted 347 people in 80 households. The 2016 census measured the population of the village as 368 people in 95 households.

In 2018, the district was separated from the county in the establishment of Salehabad County, and the rural district was transferred to the new Central District.
