= Azad Deh, Razavi Khorasan =

Village in Razavi Khorasan province, Iran

Azad Deh Persian: ازادده
- Village
- Location within Iran
- Coordinates: 35°46′16″N 60°50′10″E
- Country: Iran
- Province: Razavi Khorasan
- County: Salehabad
- District: Central
- Rural District: Bagh-e Keshmir

Population (2016)
  - Total: 1,811
- Time zone: UTC+3:30 (IRST)

Azad Deh (Persian: ازادده) (Note: Also romanized as Āzād Deh; also known as Mīshqāl and Mūshqāl) is a village in Bagh-e Keshmir Rural District of the Central District in Salehabad County, Razavi Khorasan province, Iran.

== Demographics ==
=== Population ===
At the time of the 2006 National Census, the village's population was 1,577 in 343 households, when it was in the former Salehabad District of Torbat-e Jam County. The following census in 2011 counted 1,813 people in 433 households. The 2016 census measured the population of the village as 1,811 people in 489 households, the most populous in its rural district.

In 2018, the district was separated from the county in the establishment of Salehabad County, and the rural district was transferred to the new Central District.
