= Golarcheh-ye Olya =

Village in Razavi Khorasan province, Iran

Golarcheh-ye Olya Persian: گلدرچه عليا
- Village
- Location within Iran
- Coordinates: 35°35′59″N 61°02′52″E
- Country: Iran
- Province: Razavi Khorasan
- County: Salehabad
- District: Jannatabad
- Rural District: Jannatabad

Population (2016)
  - Total: 50
- Time zone: UTC+3:30 (IRST)

Golarcheh-ye Olya (Persian: گلارچه عليا) (Note: Also romanized as Golārcheh-ye ‘Olyā; also known as Golārcheh-ye Bālā) is a village in Jannatabad Rural District of Jannatabad District in Salehabad County, Razavi Khorasan province, Iran.

== Demographics ==
=== Population ===
At the time of the 2006 National Census, the village's population was 118 in 25 households, when it was in the former Salehabad District of Torbat-e Jam County. The following census in 2011 counted 115 people in 28 households. The 2016 census measured the population of the village as 50 people in 12 households.

In 2018, the district was separated from the county in the establishment of Salehabad County, and the rural district was transferred to the new Jannatabad District.
