= Kal-e Malekabad =

Village in Razavi Khorasan province, Iran

Kal-e Malekabad Persian: كل ملك اباد
- Village
- Location within Iran
- Coordinates: 35°54′39″N 60°40′37″E
- Country: Iran
- Province: Razavi Khorasan
- County: Salehabad
- District: Central
- Rural District: Bagh-e Keshmir

Population (2016)
  - Total: 179
- Time zone: UTC+3:30 (IRST)

Kal-e Malekabad (Persian: كل ملك اباد) (Note: Also romanized as Kāl-e Malekābād and Kāl-i-Malikābād; also known as Kol-e Malekābād-e Bālā, Kol-e Malekābād-e ‘Olyā, and Qal‘eh-ye Malekābād) is a village in Bagh-e Keshmir Rural District of the Central District in Salehabad County, Razavi Khorasan province, Iran.

== Demographics ==
=== Population ===
At the time of the 2006 National Census, the village's population was 208 in 47 households, when it was in the former Salehabad District of Torbat-e Jam County. The following census in 2011 counted 224 people in 61 households. The 2016 census measured the population of the village as 179 people in 56 households.

In 2018, the district was separated from the county in the establishment of Salehabad County, and the rural district was transferred to the new Central District.
