= Shurestan, Qazvin =

Shurestan (Persian: شورستان) in Qazvin Province may refer to:

- Shurestan-e Olya, Qazvin
- Shurestan-e Sofla, Qazvin
