= Shurestan-e Olya =

Shurestan-e Olya (Persian: شورستان عليا) may refer to:

- Shurestan-e Olya, Qazvin
- Shurestan-e Olya, Razavi Khorasan
