= Golarcheh =

Golarcheh (Persian: گلارچه or گلرچه) may refer to:

- Golarcheh-ye Olya
- Golarcheh-ye Sofla
