= Golarcheh-ye Sofla =

Village in Razavi Khorasan province, Iran

Golarcheh-ye Sofla Persian: گلدرچه سفلي
- Village
- Location within Iran
- Coordinates: 35°34′37″N 61°02′19″E
- Country: Iran
- Province: Razavi Khorasan
- County: Salehabad
- District: Jannatabad
- Rural District: Jannatabad

Population (2016)
  - Total: 132
- Time zone: UTC+3:30 (IRST)

Golarcheh-ye Sofla (Persian: گلرچه سفلي) (Note: Also romanized as Golārcheh-ye Soflá; also known as Golārcheh-ye Pā’īn) is a village in Jannatabad Rural District of Jannatabad District in Salehabad County, Razavi Khorasan province, Iran.

== Demographics ==
=== Population ===
At the time of the 2006 National Census, the village's population was 207 in 44 households, when it was in the former Salehabad District of Torbat-e Jam County. The following census in 2011 counted 166 people in 49 households. The 2016 census measured the population of the village as 132 people in 41 households.

In 2018, the district was separated from the county in the establishment of Salehabad County, and the rural district was transferred to the new Jannatabad District.
