= Tut =

Tut may refer to:

== People ==
- Tutankhamun, an Egyptian pharaoh often referred to as "King Tut"
- Bernard Bartzen (1927–2019), American tennis player nicknamed "Tut"
- Tut Imlay (1902–1976), National Football League player (1926–1927)
- Rupy C. Tut (born c. 1985), Indian-born American painter
- Tut Taylor (1923–2015), American bluegrass musician
- Tin Tut (1895–1948), first foreign minister of the Union of Burma

== Places ==
- Tut, Iran (disambiguation), various villages
- Tut, Turkey, a district
- Tut (river), Mizoram, India

== Languages ==
- ISO 639 code for the proposed language family of Altaic languages
- Tutnese, an African-American language game also known as Tutahash, Tut and King Tut

== Other uses ==
- TUT (disambiguation)
- Dental click, a sound used to express disapproval in English, often spelled as "tut" or "tsk"
- Tut (miniseries), a Spike miniseries about Tutankhamun
- Tut or Thout, the first month of the ancient Egyptian and Coptic calendars
- Truncated tetrahedron, a polyhedron

== See also ==
- King Tut (disambiguation)
- Tuts Washington (1907–1984), American Louisiana blues pianist
