= Pariabad, Salehabad =

Village in Razavi Khorasan province, Iran

Pariabad Persian: پري اباد
- Village
- Location within Iran
- Coordinates: 35°44′07″N 61°06′49″E
- Country: Iran
- Province: Razavi Khorasan
- County: Salehabad
- District: Central
- Rural District: Salehabad

Population (2016)
  - Total: 82
- Time zone: UTC+3:30 (IRST)

Pariabad (Persian: پري اباد) (Note: Also romanized as Parīābād; also known as Marīābād) is a village in Salehabad Rural District of the Central District in Salehabad County, Razavi Khorasan province, Iran.

== Demographics ==
=== Population ===
At the time of the 2006 National Census, the village's population was 78 in 21 households, when it was in the former Salehabad District of Torbat-e Jam County. The following census in 2011 counted 69 people in 19 households. The 2016 census measured the population of the village as 82 people in 21 households.

In 2018, the district was separated from the county in the establishment of Salehabad County, and the rural district was transferred to the new Central District.
