= Shah Tut, Razavi Khorasan =

Village in Razavi Khorasan province, Iran

Shah Tut Persian: شاه توت
- Village
- Location within Iran
- Coordinates: 35°53′16″N 60°49′50″E
- Country: Iran
- Province: Razavi Khorasan
- County: Salehabad
- District: Central
- Rural District: Bagh-e Keshmir

Population (2016)
  - Total: 611
- Time zone: UTC+3:30 (IRST)

Shah Tut (Persian: شاه توت) (Note: Also romanized as Shāh Tūt) is a village in Bagh-e Keshmir Rural District of the Central District in Salehabad County, Razavi Khorasan province, Iran.

== Demographics ==
=== Population ===
At the time of the 2006 National Census, the village's population was 532 in 112 households, when it was in the former Salehabad District of Torbat-e Jam County. The following census in 2011 counted 571 people in 136 households. The 2016 census measured the population of the village as 611 people in 188 households.

In 2018, the district was separated from the county in the establishment of Salehabad County, and the rural district was transferred to the new Central District.
