= Deraz Ab =

Deraz Ab (Persian: درازاب) may refer to:

- Deraz Ab, Razavi Khorasan
- Deraz Ab, Semnan
- Deraz Ab-e Olya, Razavi Khorasan Province
- Deraz Ab-e Sofla, Razavi Khorasan Province
