= Shahveh =

Shahveh (Persian: شهوه) may refer to:

- Shahveh, Markazi
- Shahveh-ye Olya, Razavi Khorasan Province
- Shahveh-ye Sofla, Razavi Khorasan Province
