= Kal-e Sorkh, Razavi Khorasan =

Village in Razavi Khorasan province, Iran

Kal-e Sorkh Persian: كال سرخ
- Village
- Location within Iran
- Coordinates: 35°40′11″N 60°44′36″E
- Country: Iran
- Province: Razavi Khorasan
- County: Salehabad
- District: Central
- Rural District: Qaleh Hamam

Population (2016)
  - Total: 336
- Time zone: UTC+3:30 (IRST)

Kal-e Sorkh (Persian: كال سرخ) (Note: Also romanized as Kāl-e Sorkh) is a village in Qaleh Hamam Rural District of the Central District in Salehabad County, Razavi Khorasan province, Iran.

== Demographics ==
=== Population ===
At the time of the 2006 National Census, the village's population was 273 in 56 households, when it was in the former Salehabad District of Torbat-e Jam County. The following census in 2011 counted 291 people in 69 households. The 2016 census measured the population of the village as 336 people in 84 households.

In 2018, the district was separated from the county in the establishment of Salehabad County, and the rural district was transferred to the new Central District.
