= Borjak-e Naqdali =

Village in Razavi Khorasan province, Iran

Borjak-e Naqdali Persian: برجك نقدعلي
- Village
- Location within Iran
- Coordinates: 35°36′29″N 60°47′30″E
- Country: Iran
- Province: Razavi Khorasan
- County: Salehabad
- District: Central
- Rural District: Qaleh Hamam

Population (2016)
  - Total: 403
- Time zone: UTC+3:30 (IRST)

Borjak-e Naqdali (Persian: برجك نقدعلي) (Note: Also romanized as Borjak-e Naqd‘alī; also known as Naqd ‘Alī, Naqd ‘Alī Pā’īn, and Qal‘eh-ye Naqd ‘Alī) is a village in Qaleh Hamam Rural District of the Central District in Salehabad County, Razavi Khorasan province, Iran.

== Demographics ==
=== Population ===
At the time of the 2006 National Census, the village's population was 298 in 53 households, when it was in the former Salehabad District of Torbat-e Jam County. The following census in 2011 counted 318 people in 68 households. The 2016 census measured the population of the village as 403 people in 94 households.

In 2018, the district was separated from the county in the establishment of Salehabad County, and the rural district was transferred to the new Central District.
