= Shurestan-e Sofla =

Shurestan-e Sofla (Persian: شورستان سفلي) may refer to:

- Shurestan-e Sofla, Qazvin
- Shurestan-e Sofla, Razavi Khorasan
