= Emam Qaleh-ye Olya =

Village in Razavi Khorasan province, Iran

Emam Qaleh-ye Olya Persian: امام قلعه عليا
- Village
- Location within Iran
- Coordinates: 35°33′50″N 60°53′23″E
- Country: Iran
- Province: Razavi Khorasan
- County: Salehabad
- District: Central
- Rural District: Qaleh Hamam

Population (2016)
  - Total: 285
- Time zone: UTC+3:30 (IRST)

Emam Qaleh-ye Olya (Persian: امام قلعه عليا) (Note: Also romanized as Emām Qal‘eh-ye ‘Olyā; formerly known as Shāhneshīn-e ‘Olyā (شاه نشين عليا); also known as Shāhneshīn-e Bālā) is a village in Qaleh Hamam Rural District of the Central District in Salehabad County, Razavi Khorasan province, Iran.

== Demographics ==
=== Population ===
At the time of the 2006 National Census, the village's population was 284 in 65 households, when it was in the former Salehabad District of Torbat-e Jam County. The following census in 2011 counted 287 people in 70 households. The 2016 census measured the population of the village as 285 people in 70 households.

In 2018, the district was separated from the county in the establishment of Salehabad County, and the rural district was transferred to the new Central District.
