= Deraz Ab-e Olya =

Village in Razavi Khorasan province, Iran

Deraz Ab-e Olya Persian: درازاب عليا
- Village
- Location within Iran
- Coordinates: 35°51′26″N 60°57′32″E
- Country: Iran
- Province: Razavi Khorasan
- County: Salehabad
- District: Central
- Rural District: Bagh-e Keshmir

Population (2016)
  - Total: 570
- Time zone: UTC+3:30 (IRST)

Deraz Ab-e Olya (Persian: درازاب عليا) (Note: Also romanized as Derāz Āb-e ‘Olyā; also known as Derāz Āb-e Bālā) is a village in Bagh-e Keshmir Rural District of the Central District in Salehabad County, Razavi Khorasan province, Iran.

== Demographics ==
=== Population ===
At the time of the 2006 National Census, the village's population was 539 in 112 households, when it was in the former Salehabad District of Torbat-e Jam County. The following census in 2011 counted 612 people in 169 households. The 2016 census measured the population of the village as 570 people in 164 households.

In 2018, the district was separated from the county in the establishment of Salehabad County, and the rural district was transferred to the new Central District.
