= Deraz Ab-e Sofla =

Village in Razavi Khorasan province, Iran

Deraz Ab-e Sofla Persian: درازاب سفلي
- Village
- Location within Iran
- Coordinates: 35°51′07″N 60°57′57″E
- Country: Iran
- Province: Razavi Khorasan
- County: Salehabad
- District: Central
- Rural District: Bagh-e Keshmir

Population (2016)
  - Total: 1,079
- Time zone: UTC+3:30 (IRST)

Deraz Ab-e Sofla (Persian: درازاب سفلي) (Note: Also romanized as Derāz Āb-e Soflá; also known as Derāz Āb-e Pā’īn) is a village in Bagh-e Keshmir Rural District of the Central District in Salehabad County, Razavi Khorasan province, Iran.

== Demographics ==
=== Population ===
At the time of the 2006 National Census, the village's population was 948 in 213 households, when it was in the former Salehabad District of Torbat-e Jam County. The following census in 2011 counted 987 people in 248 households. The 2016 census measured the population of the village as 1,079 people in 293 households.

In 2018, the district was separated from the county in the establishment of Salehabad County, and the rural district was transferred to the new Central District.
