= Gurkhar =

Village in Razavi Khorasan province, Iran

Gurkhar Persian: گورخار
- Village
- Location within Iran
- Coordinates: 35°49′27″N 60°44′22″E
- Country: Iran
- Province: Razavi Khorasan
- County: Salehabad
- District: Central
- Rural District: Bagh-e Keshmir

Population (2016)
  - Total: 545
- Time zone: UTC+3:30 (IRST)

Gurkhar (Persian: گورخار) (Note: Also romanized as Gūr-e Khār and Gūrkhar; also known as Gowhar, Gūr Khvār, Gūreh Khār, and Kūreh Khvār) is a village in Bagh-e Keshmir Rural District of the Central District in Salehabad County, Razavi Khorasan province, Iran.

== Demographics ==
=== Population ===
At the time of the 2006 National Census, the village's population was 476 in 105 households, when it was in the former Salehabad District of Torbat-e Jam County. The following census in 2011 counted 497 people in 124 households. The 2016 census measured the population of the village as 545 people in 142 households.

In 2018, the district was separated from the county in the establishment of Salehabad County, and the rural district was transferred to the new Central District.
