= Natu, Iran =

Village in Razavi Khorasan province, Iran

Natu Persian: نعتو
- Village
- Location within Iran
- Coordinates: 35°52′30″N 60°41′12″E
- Country: Iran
- Province: Razavi Khorasan
- County: Salehabad
- District: Central
- Rural District: Bagh-e Keshmir

Population (2016)
  - Total: 355
- Time zone: UTC+3:30 (IRST)

Natu (Persian: نعتو) (Note: Also romanized as Na‘tū) is a village in, and the capital of, Bagh-e Keshmir Rural District in the Central District of Salehabad County, Razavi Khorasan province, Iran.

== Demographics ==
=== Population ===
At the time of the 2006 National Census, the village's population was 365 in 93 households, when it was in the former Salehabad District of Torbat-e Jam County. The following census in 2011 counted 340 people in 100 households. The 2016 census measured the population of the village as 355 people in 102 households.

In 2018, the district was separated from the county in the establishment of Salehabad County, and the rural district was transferred to the new Central District.
