= Kal-e Sorkh =

Kal-e Sorkh (Persian: كال سرخ) may refer to:

- Kal-e Sorkh, Razavi Khorasan
- Kal-e Sorkh, South Khorasan
