= Shurestan-e Olya, Razavi Khorasan =

Village in Razavi Khorasan province, Iran

Shurestan-e Olya Persian: شورستان عليا
- Village
- Location within Iran
- Coordinates: 35°43′39″N 61°01′39″E
- Country: Iran
- Province: Razavi Khorasan
- County: Salehabad
- District: Central
- Rural District: Salehabad

Population (2016)
  - Total: 1,207
- Time zone: UTC+3:30 (IRST)

Shurestan-e Olya (Persian: شورستان عليا) (Note: Also romanized as Shūrestān-e ‘Olyā; also known as Shūrestān, Shūrestān Bālā, Shūrestān-e Bālā, and Shūristān Bālā) is a village in Salehabad Rural District of the Central District in Salehabad County, Razavi Khorasan province, Iran.

== Demographics ==
=== Population ===
At the time of the 2006 National Census, the village's population was 927 in 206 households, when it was in the former Salehabad District of Torbat-e Jam County. The following census in 2011 counted 1,119 people in 264 households. The 2016 census measured the population of the village as 1,207 people in 301 households.

In 2018, the district was separated from the county in the establishment of Salehabad County, and the rural district was transferred to the new Central District.
