= King Tut (disambiguation) =

King Tut is a colloquial name for Tutankhamun, an Egyptian pharaoh.

King Tut may also refer to:

- King Tut (comics), a character from the Batman TV series
- "King Tut" (song), a novelty song by Steve Martin
- Tutnese, an African-American language game also known as Tutahash, Tut and King Tut
- King Tut, also known as Tut's tomb, a variant of the solitaire card game Pyramid
- King Tut, dog owned by President Herbert Hoover
- King Tut Drive-In
- King Tut Strut (disambiguation)
- King Tut's Wah Wah Hut (New York City) 1980s–1990s club and theater space
  - King Tut's Wah Wah Hut live music venue in Glasgow, Scotland

== See also ==
- Tutankhamun (disambiguation)
