= Shah Tut =

Shah Tut (Persian: شاه توت) may refer to:

- Shah Tut, Razavi Khorasan
- Shah Tut, South Khorasan
