= Shurestan-e Sofla, Razavi Khorasan =

Village in Razavi Khorasan province, Iran

Shurestan-e Sofla Persian: شورستان سفلي
- Village
- Location within Iran
- Coordinates: 35°44′05″N 61°03′14″E
- Country: Iran
- Province: Razavi Khorasan
- County: Salehabad
- District: Central
- Rural District: Salehabad

Population (2016)
  - Total: 499
- Time zone: UTC+3:30 (IRST)

Shurestan-e Sofla (Persian: شورستان سفلي) (Note: Also romanized as Shūrestān-e Soflá; also known as Shūrestān Pā’āin, Shūrestān-e Pā’īn, and Shūristān Pāīn) is a village in Salehabad Rural District of the Central District in Salehabad County, Razavi Khorasan province, Iran.

== Demographics ==
=== Population ===
At the time of the 2006 National Census, the village's population was 539 in 116 households, when it was in the former Salehabad District of Torbat-e Jam County. The following census in 2011 counted 564 people in 130 households. The 2016 census measured the population of the village as 499 people in 123 households.

In 2018, the district was separated from the county in the establishment of Salehabad County, and the rural district was transferred to the new Central District.
