= Jannatabad, Salehabad =

City in Razavi Khorasan province, Iran

Jannatabad Persian: جنت‌آباد
- City
- Location within Iran
- Coordinates: 35°35′53″N 61°08′29″E
- Country: Iran
- Province: Razavi Khorasan
- County: Salehabad
- District: Jannatabad
- Established as a city: 2021

Population (2016)
  - Total: 1,261
- Time zone: UTC+3:30 (IRST)

Jannatabad (Persian: جنت‌آباد) (Note: Also romanized as Jannatābād) is a city in, and the capital of, Jannatabad District in Salehabad County, Razavi Khorasan province, Iran. It also serves as the administrative center for Jannatabad Rural District.

== Demographics ==
=== Population ===
At the time of the 2006 National Census, Jannatabad's population was 1,651 in 377 households, when it was a village in Jannatabad Rural District of the former Salehabad District in Torbat-e Jam County. The following census in 2011 counted 1,647 people in 360 households. The 2016 census measured the population of the village as 1,261 people in 363 households.

In 2018, the district was separated from the county in the establishment of Salehabad County, and the rural district was transferred to the new Jannatabad District. The village of Jannatabad was converted to a city in 2021.
