= Azaddeh =

Azaddeh or Azad Deh (Persian: ازادده) may refer to:

- Azaddeh, Qazvin
- Azad Deh, Razavi Khorasan
