= Natu =

Natu may refer to:

== People ==
=== Given name ===
- Natu Gopal Narhar (1911–1991), Marathi poet
- Natu Tuatagaloa (born 1966), former professional football player in the American NFL
- Natu (singer), pseudonym of Polish singer Natalia Przybysz

=== Surname ===
- Natu (surname)
  - Balaji Pant Natu, person in Indian history

== Places ==
- Natu, Iran, a village in Razavi Khorasan Province, Iran
- Natu La, a mountain pass in the Himalayas

== Other uses ==
- Natú language, an extinct language of eastern Brazil
- Natu (Pokémon), one of the fictional Pokémon species
- Soranik Natu, a fictional character in DC comics
