= Qaleh-ye Malekabad =

Qaleh-ye Malekabad or Qaleh-i-Malakabad (Persian: قلعه ملكاباد) may refer to:

- Qaleh-ye Malekabad, Fars
- Qaleh-ye Malekabad, Razavi Khorasan
