= Ostay Rural District =

Rural district in Razavi Khorasan province, Iran

Ostay Rural District Persian: دهستان استای
- Rural District
- Location within Iran
- Coordinates: 35°28′N 61°05′E
- Country: Iran
- Province: Razavi Khorasan
- County: Salehabad
- District: Jannatabad
- Established: 2018
- Capital: Kariz Kohandel
- Time zone: UTC+3:30 (IRST)

Ostay Rural District (Persian: دهستان استای) is in Jannatabad District of Salehabad County, Razavi Khorasan province, Iran. Its capital is the village of Kariz Kohandel, whose population at the time of the 2016 National Census was 1,598 in 395 households.

== History ==
In 2018, Salehabad District was separated from Torbat-e Jam County in the establishment of Salehabad County, and Ostay Rural District was created in the new Jannatabad District.

== Other villages in the rural district ==
- Cheshmeh Anjir
- Har Kareh
- Kamarcheh
- Karizak-e Hajji Pasand
- Kariz-e Now
- Khorramabad-e Olya
- Khorramabad-e Sofla
- Kondeh Sukhteh
- Ostay-ye Olya
- Ostay-ye Sofla
- Padeh-ye Musa Khan
- Tut-e Safar
- Tut-e Lashkaran
- Tut-e Seyyed Mohammad
