= Salehabad Rural District (Salehabad County) =

Rural district in Razavi Khorasan province, Iran

Salehabad Rural District Persian: دهستان صالح آباد
- Rural District
- Location within Iran
- Coordinates: 35°47′N 61°03′E
- Country: Iran
- Province: Razavi Khorasan
- County: Salehabad
- District: Central
- Established: 1987
- Capital: Esmailabad

Population (2016)
  - Total: 7,555
- Time zone: UTC+3:30 (IRST)

Salehabad Rural District (Persian: دهستان صالح آباد) is in the Central District of Salehabad County, Razavi Khorasan province, Iran. Its capital is the village of Esmailabad.

== Demographics ==
=== Population ===
At the time of the 2006 National Census, the rural district's population (as a part of the former Salehabad District in Torbat-e Jam County) was 7,147 in 1,614 households. There were 7,660 inhabitants in 1,867 households at the following census of 2011. The 2016 census measured the population of the rural district as 7,555 in 1,986 households. The most populous of its 28 villages was Gush Laghar, with 1,574 people.

In 2018, the district was separated from the county in the establishment of Salehabad County, and the rural district was transferred to the new Central District of Salehabad County.

=== Other villages in the rural district ===
- Abbasabad-e Kheyrabad
- Cheshmeh Teymuri
- Derakht-e Tut
- Feyzabad
- Hemmatabad
- Hoseynabad
- Jahanabad
- Kal Aqayeh-ye Olya
- Kalateh-ye Abu ol Qasem
- Kalateh-ye Ghows ol Din
- Kalateh-ye Hajji Rahmat
- Kariz Khaneh
- Kheyrabad
- Mehdiabad
- Pariabad
- Pir Anjiri
- Sangab
- Saqar Cheshmeh-ye Sofla
- Shahrak-e Mohammad Hajji
- Shurestan-e Olya
- Shurestan-e Sofla
