= Bagh-e Keshmir Rural District =

Rural district in Razavi Khorasan province, Iran

Bagh-e Keshmir Rural District Persian: دهستان باغ كشمير
- Rural District
- Location within Iran
- Coordinates: 35°51′N 60°48′E
- Country: Iran
- Province: Razavi Khorasan
- County: Salehabad
- District: Central
- Established: 1987
- Capital: Natu

Population (2016)
  - Total: 10,607
- Time zone: UTC+3:30 (IRST)

Bagh-e Keshmir Rural District (Persian: دهستان باغ كشمير) is in the Central District of Salehabad County, Razavi Khorasan province, Iran. Its capital is the village of Natu.

== Demographics ==
=== Population ===
At the time of the 2006 National Census, the rural district's population (as a part of the former Salehabad District in Torbat-e Jam County) was 10,011 in 2,208 households. There were 10,399 inhabitants in 2,614 households at the following census of 2011. The 2016 census measured the population of the rural district as 10,607 in 2,940 households. The most populous of its 25 villages was Azad Deh, with 1,811 people.

In 2018, the district was separated from the county in the establishment of Salehabad County, and the rural district was transferred to the new Central District.

=== Other villages in the rural district ===
- Bagh-e Keshmir-e Olya
- Cheshmeh-ye Abdal Karim
- Cheshmeh-ye Azad
- Cheshmeh-ye Gol
- Cheshmeh Zard
- Derakht-e Bid
- Deraz Ab-e Olya
- Deraz Ab-e Sofla
- Falizak
- Gurkhar
- Kal-e Karab
- Kal-e Malekabad
- Karizak-e Yaqubi
- Mamiz Ab
- Pir Vahsh
- Qaleh Hammam-e Hajji Rasul
- Shah Tut
- Shurab
- Yekkeh Bagh
