= Tutankhamun (disambiguation) =

Tutankhamun was an Egyptian pharaoh of the 18th dynasty.

Tutankhamun or Tutankhamen may also refer to:

- Tutankhamun (album), a 1969 album by the Art Ensemble of Chicago
- Tutankhamun (TV series), a 2016 adventure-drama serial
- Tutankhamen (9th Wonder album), 2012
- "Tutankhamen" (song), 1997, from Angels Fall First by Nightwish

== See also ==
- King Tut (disambiguation)
- Exhibitions of artifacts from the tomb of Tutankhamun
- Tutankhamun and the Daughter of Ra, a 1989 novel by Moyra Caldecott
- Tutankham, a video game named after the Pharaoh
- or
