= Qaleh Hamam Rural District =

Rural district in Razavi Khorasan province, Iran

Qaleh Hamam Rural District Persian: دهستان قلعه حمام
- Rural District
- Location within Iran
- Coordinates: 35°36′N 60°51′E
- Country: Iran
- Province: Razavi Khorasan
- County: Salehabad
- District: Central
- Established: 1987
- Capital: Jafariyeh

Population (2016)
  - Total: 8,477
- Time zone: UTC+3:30 (IRST)

Qaleh Hamam Rural District (Persian: دهستان قلعه حمام) is in the Central District of Salehabad County, Razavi Khorasan province, Iran. Its capital is the village of Jafariyeh.

== Demographics ==
=== Population ===
At the time of the 2006 National Census, the rural district's population (as a part of the former Salehabad District in Torbat-e Jam County) was 7,687 in 1,668 households. There were 8,404 inhabitants in 2,110 households at the following census of 2011. The 2016 census measured the population of the rural district as 8,477 in 2,253 households. The most populous of its 18 villages was Bani Tak, with 1,740 people.

In 2018, the district was separated from the county in the establishment of Salehabad County, and the rural district was transferred to the new Central District.

=== Other villages in the rural district ===
- Borjak-e Naqdali
- Emam Qaleh-ye Olya
- Hajjiabad
- Jahanabad-e Maleki
- Kal-e Sorkh
- Khvajeh Taun
- Mikhak
- Naqdali-ye Olya
- Naqdali-ye Sofla
- Padeh-ye Jan Morad
- Qaleh Hammam
- Qosheh Tut
- Rahimabd
- Sar Ab
- Yekkeh Tut
