= TUT =

TUT may refer to:

== Arts and media ==
- Tramways & Urban Transit, a British magazine
- The Unquestionable Truth, a 2005 Limp Bizkit album
- The Unbelievable Truth (radio show), UK
- Tulip Television, Japan

== Education ==
=== Japan ===
- Tokyo University of Technology
- Toyohashi University of Technology
- Tsukuba University of Technology

=== Elsewhere ===
- Tainan University of Technology, Taiwan
- Taiyuan University of Technology, China
- Tallinn University of Technology, Estonia
- Tampere University of Technology, Finland
- Tshwane University of Technology, South Africa

== Other uses ==
- Time under tension, in muscle training
- Altaic languages, a constested Asian family (ISO 639-3:tut)

== See also ==
- Tut (disambiguation)
