= Pariabad, South Khorasan =

Pariabad پري اباد
- Village
- Location within Iran
- Coordinates: 31°50′50″N 59°54′32″E
- Country: Iran
- Province: South Khorasan
- County: Nehbandan
- Bakhsh: Shusef
- Rural District: Shusef

Population (2006)
  - Total: 16
- Time zone: UTC+3:30 (IRST)
  - Summer (DST): UTC+4:30 (IRDT)

Pariabad (Persian: پري اباد, also Romanized as Parīābād) is a village in Shusef Rural District, Shusef District, Nehbandan County, South Khorasan Province, Iran. At the 2006 census, its population was 16, in 6 families.
