= Shurestan, Razavi Khorasan =

Shurestan شورستان
- Village
- Location within Iran
- Coordinates: 36°41′31″N 60°01′25″E
- Country: Iran
- Province: Razavi Khorasan
- County: Kalat
- Bakhsh: Zavin
- Rural District: Zavin

Population (2006)
  - Total: 484
- Time zone: UTC+3:30 (IRST)
  - Summer (DST): UTC+4:30 (IRDT)

Shurestan (Persian: شورستان, also Romanized as Shūrestān) is a village in Zavin Rural District, Zavin District, Kalat County, Razavi Khorasan Province, Iran. At the 2006 census, its population was 484, in 105 families.
