= Pariabad, Mashhad =

Pariabad پري اباد
- Village
- Location within Iran
- Coordinates: 36°35′41″N 59°21′47″E
- Country: Iran
- Province: Razavi Khorasan
- County: Mashhad
- Bakhsh: Central
- Rural District: Miyan Velayat

Population (2006)
  - Total: 226
- Time zone: UTC+3:30 (IRST)
  - Summer (DST): UTC+4:30 (IRDT)

Pariabad (Persian: پري اباد, also romanized as Parīābād; also known as Paridābād) is a village in Miyan Velayat Rural District, in the Central District of Mashhad County, Razavi Khorasan Province, Iran. At the 2006 census, its population was 226, in 56 families.
