= King Tut Strut =

King Tut's Strut, or the King Tut Strut is the title of more than one song:

- A jazz tune composed by Nick LaRocca, and not recorded by his Original Dixieland Jazz Band, but recorded decades later by a different band of the same name under the direction of LaRocca's son.
- Dr Frank Minyard & the Mummies recorded a song called "King Tut Strut" in the 1970s
- A song called "King Tut's Strut" composed by Hotep Idris Galeta has been recorded by numerous artists, including:
  - Hotep Idris Galeta
  - The Jackie McLean (1931–2006), Quintet on their 1988 album Dynasty
  - Marc Cary (born 1967), on his 1999 album Trillium
  - Stefon Harris & Blackout, on their 2004 album Evolution

== See also ==
- ""King Tut" (song), 1978
- "Walk Like an Egyptian"
- Egypt in the European imagination
- Egypt Strut
