= Gur Khar, Khuzestan =

Gur Khar گورخر
- Village
- Location within Iran
- Coordinates: 31°41′32″N 49°44′01″E
- Country: Iran
- Province: Khuzestan
- County: Izeh
- Bakhsh: Central
- Rural District: Holayjan

Population (2006)
  - Total: 48
- Time zone: UTC+3:30 (IRST)
  - Summer (DST): UTC+4:30 (IRDT)

Gur Khar (Persian: گورخر, also Romanized as Gūr-e Khār, Gur-i-Khar, and Gūr Khar; also known as Ghūr Khar) is a village in Holayjan Rural District, in the Central District of Izeh County, Khuzestan Province, Iran. At the 2006 census, its population was 48, in 10 families.
