= Shahin Qaleh =

Village in Razavi Khorasan, Iran

Shahin Qaleh شاهین‌قلعه
- Village
- Location within Iran
- Coordinates: 36°30′29″N 59°22′17″E
- Country: Iran
- Province: Razavi Khorasan
- County: Mashhad
- Bakhsh: Central
- Rural District: Miyan Velayat

Population (2006)
  - Total: 239
- Time zone: UTC+3:30 (IRST)
  - Summer (DST): UTC+4:30 (IRDT)

Shahin Qaleh (Persian: شاهین‌قلعه, also Romanized as Shāhīn Qal‘eh; also known as Emām Qal‘eh (امام‌قلعه)) is a village in Miyan Velayat Rural District, in the Central District of Mashhad County, Razavi Khorasan Province, Iran. At the 2006 census, its population was 239, in 61 families.
