= Gur-e Khar, Fars =

Gur-e Khar گورخر
- Village
- Location within Iran
- Coordinates: 28°32′01″N 55°15′55″E
- Country: Iran
- Province: Fars
- County: Darab
- Bakhsh: Rostaq
- Rural District: Kuhestan

Population (2006)
  - Total: 112
- Time zone: UTC+3:30 (IRST)
  - Summer (DST): UTC+4:30 (IRDT)

Gur-e Khar (Persian: گورخر, also Romanized as Gūr-e Khar) is a village in Kuhestan Rural District, Rostaq District, Darab County, Fars province, Iran. At the 2006 census, its population was 112, in 20 families.
