= Tut-e Sofla =

Tut-e Sofla توت سفلي
- Village
- Location within Iran
- Coordinates: 32°29′16″N 48°48′17″E
- Country: Iran
- Province: Khuzestan
- County: Dezful
- Bakhsh: Sardasht
- Rural District: Sardasht

Population (2006)
  - Total: 166
- Time zone: UTC+3:30 (IRST)
  - Summer (DST): UTC+4:30 (IRDT)

Tut-e Sofla (Persian: توت سفلي, also Romanized as Tūt-e Soflá; also known as Māl-e Tīt and Māltīt) is a village in Sardasht Rural District, Sardasht District, Dezful County, Khuzestan Province, Iran. At the 2006 census, its population was 166, in 27 families.
