= Tut-e Olya =

Tut-e Olya توت عليا
- Village
- Location within Iran
- Coordinates: 32°29′44″N 48°48′08″E
- Country: Iran
- Province: Khuzestan
- County: Dezful
- Bakhsh: Sardasht
- Rural District: Sardasht

Population (2006)
  - Total: 801
- Time zone: UTC+3:30 (IRST)
  - Summer (DST): UTC+4:30 (IRDT)

Tut-e Olya (Persian: توت عليا, also Romanized as Tūt-e ‘Olyā) is a village in Sardasht Rural District, Sardasht District, Dezful County, Khuzestan Province, Iran. At the 2006 census, its population was 801, in 143 families.
