= King Tut Drive-In =

Drive-in barbecue restaurant

Coordinates: 37°47′10″N 81°10′18″W

- Signage
- Interactive map of King Tut Drive-In

Restaurant information
- Established: 1945; 81 years ago
- Closed: August 29, 2023
- Owner: Dave McKay
- Previous owner: Tutweiller family (1945-1955)
- Food type: American; Barbecue
- Location: 301 N Eisenhower Drive, Beckley, Raleigh, West Virginia, 25801, United States
- Website: kingtutdrivein.com

King Tut Drive-In was a drive-in American and barbecue restaurant located on North Eisenhower Drive in Beckley, West Virginia.

== History ==
King Tut's Drive-In was located on 301 North Eisenhower Drive. It was established in 1945 by the Tutweiler family, who transferred ownership of the restaurant to John McKay in 1955. Son Dave McKay, who used to work at the restaurant making pizza for 25 cents an hour, operated the restaurant with his brother Jeff for a while until the latter moved to Maryland. The restaurant includes an awning over the parking area, a building that houses the kitchen and a large marquee at the front of the parking lot that serves as the menu. Typical of drive-in restaurants, the servers (called "curb girls" by McKay) fill orders and bring food out to the customer's cars.

On September 25, 2020, the restaurant announced that it would be closing temporarily due to the COVID-19 pandemic. It re-opened almost 2 weeks later on October 8.

On July 31, 2023, the owners of the restaurant announced that they are making plans to sell the restaurant and retire from service.

King Tut Drive-In closed permanently on August 29, 2023.

== Description ==
The drive-in has a large neon sign of its logo, a yellow and red crown. The restaurant was open daily from 10 am to 11 pm, except for Wednesdays. According to Dave McKay, the restaurant's choice of day off was part of an agreement John McKay had with the other drive-in restaurant owners in the area.

== Menu ==
The restaurant's menu is "large" and serves breakfast, lunch and dinner including hoagies, sandwiches, pot roast, chicken livers and swiss steak with their most popular items being the barbecue, hot dogs, specialty salads and pizza. Dessert items include a root-beer float, milkshakes and three kinds of pie (apple, coconut and either chocolate or cherry cream). Many of the drive-in's recipes were created by McKay's grandmother, Kenneth McKay.
