= Salehabad, Razavi Khorasan =

City in Razavi Khorasan province, Iran

Salehabad Persian: صالح آباد
- City
- Location within Iran
- Coordinates: 35°41′17″N 61°05′44″E
- Country: Iran
- Province: Razavi Khorasan
- County: Salehabad
- District: Central

Population (2016)
  - Total: 8,625
- Time zone: UTC+3:30 (IRST)

Salehabad (Persian: صالح آباد) (Note: Also romanized as Şāleḩābād) is a city in the Central District of Salehabad County, Razavi Khorasan province, Iran, serving as capital of both the county and the district.

== Demographics ==
=== Population ===
At the time of the 2006 National Census, the city's population was 8,280 in 1,877 households, when it was capital of the former Salehabad District in Torbat-e Jam County. The following census in 2011 counted 9,642 people in 2,240 households. The 2016 census measured the population of the city as 8,625 people in 2,198 households.

In 2018, the district was separated from the county in the establishment of Salehabad County, and Salehabad was transferred to the new Central District as the county's capital.
