= Shurestan, South Khorasan =

Shurestan شورستان
- Village
- Location within Iran
- Coordinates: 32°32′15″N 59°39′03″E
- Country: Iran
- Province: South Khorasan
- County: Sarbisheh
- Bakhsh: Central
- Rural District: Momenabad

Population (2006)
  - Total: 145
- Time zone: UTC+3:30 (IRST)
  - Summer (DST): UTC+4:30 (IRDT)

Shurestan (Persian: شورستان, also Romanized as Shūrestān and Shoorestan; also known as Sarāi Nau and Sarāy-e Now) is a village in Momenabad Rural District, in the Central District of Sarbisheh County, South Khorasan Province, Iran. At the 2006 census, its population was 145, in 57 families.
