= Shurestan-e Olya, Qazvin =

Shurestan-e Olya شورستان عليا
- Village
- Location within Iran
- Coordinates: 36°22′59″N 50°30′22″E
- Country: Iran
- Province: Qazvin
- County: Qazvin
- Bakhsh: Rudbar-e Alamut
- Rural District: Alamut-e Bala

Population (2006)
  - Total: 216
- Time zone: UTC+3:30 (IRST)
  - Summer (DST): UTC+4:30 (IRDT)

Shurestan-e Olya (Persian: شورستان عليا, also Romanized as Shūrestān-e ‘Olyā) is a village in Alamut-e Bala Rural District, Rudbar-e Alamut District, Qazvin County, Qazvin Province, Iran. At the 2006 census, its population was 216, in 66 families.
