= Jannatabad Rural District =

Rural district in Razavi Khorasan province, Iran

Jannatabad Rural District Persian: دهستان جنت‌آباد
- Rural District
- Location within Iran
- Coordinates: 35°36′N 61°08′E
- Country: Iran
- Province: Razavi Khorasan
- County: Salehabad
- District: Jannatabad
- Established: 1987
- Capital: Jannatabad

Population (2016)
  - Total: 8,162
- Time zone: UTC+3:30 (IRST)

Jannatabad Rural District (Persian: دهستان جنت‌آباد) is in Jannatabad District of Salehabad County, Razavi Khorasan province, Iran. It is administered from the city of Jannatabad.

== Demographics ==
=== Population ===
At the time of the 2006 National Census, the rural district's population (as a part of the former Salehabad District in Torbat-e Jam County) was 10,087 in 2,129 households. There were 9,610 inhabitants in 2,264 households at the following census of 2011. The 2016 census measured the population of the rural district as 8,162 in 2,108 households. The most populous of its 36 villages was Kariz Kohandel (now in Ostay Rural District), with 1,598 people.

In 2018, the district was separated from the county in the establishment of Salehabad County, and the rural district was transferred to the new Jannatabad District.

=== Other villages in the rural district ===
- Abu Torab
- Borjak-e Sheykhi
- Ebrahim Bay
- Golarcheh-ye Olya
- Golarcheh-ye Sofla
- Gormasi
- Hasanabad
- Kalateh-ye Baqi
- Kalateh-ye Deh Now
- Kalateh-ye Hamid
- Kalateh-ye Samad
- Nasrabad
- Siah Khowleh
