= Jannatabad District =

District in Razavi Khorasan province, Iran

Jannatabad District Persian: بخش جنت‌آباد
- District
- Location within Iran
- Coordinates: 35°31′N 61°05′E
- Country: Iran
- Province: Razavi Khorasan
- County: Salehabad
- Established: 2018
- Capital: Jannatabad
- Time zone: UTC+3:30 (IRST)

Jannatabad District (Persian: بخش جنت‌آباد) is in Salehabad County, Razavi Khorasan province, Iran. Its capital is the city of Jannatabad, whose population at the time of the 2016 National Census was 1,261 in 363 households.

== History ==
In 2018, Salehabad District was separated from Torbat-e Jam County in the establishment of Salehabad County, which was divided into two districts and five rural districts, with Salehabad as its capital and only city at the time. The village of Jannatabad was converted to a city in 2021.

== Demographics ==
=== Administrative divisions ===
Jannatabad District
Administrative Divisions
Jannatabad RD
Ostay RD
Jannatabad (city) (Note: Became a city after the 2016 census)
RD = Rural District
