= Central District (Salehabad County) =

District in Razavi Khorasan province, Iran

Central District (Salehabad County) Persian: بخش مرکزی شهرستان صالح‌آباد
- District
- Location within Iran
- Coordinates: 35°43′N 60°54′E
- Country: Iran
- Province: Razavi Khorasan
- County: Salehabad
- Established: 2018
- Capital: Salehabad
- Time zone: UTC+3:30 (IRST)

The Central District of Salehabad County (Persian: بخش مرکزی شهرستان صالح‌آباد) is in Razavi Khorasan province, Iran. Its capital is the city of Salehabad, whose population at the time of the 2016 National Census was 8,625 in 2,198 households.

== History ==
In 2018, Salehabad District was separated from Torbat-e Jam County in the establishment of Salehabad County, which was divided into two districts and five rural districts, with Salehabad as its capital and only city at the time.

== Demographics ==
=== Administrative divisions ===
Central District (Salehabad County)
Administrative Divisions
Bagh-e Keshmir RD
Qaleh Hamam RD
Salehabad RD
Salehabad (city)
RD = Rural District
