= Salehabad County =

County in Razavi Khorasan province, Iran

Salehabad County Persian: شهرستان صالح‌آباد
- County
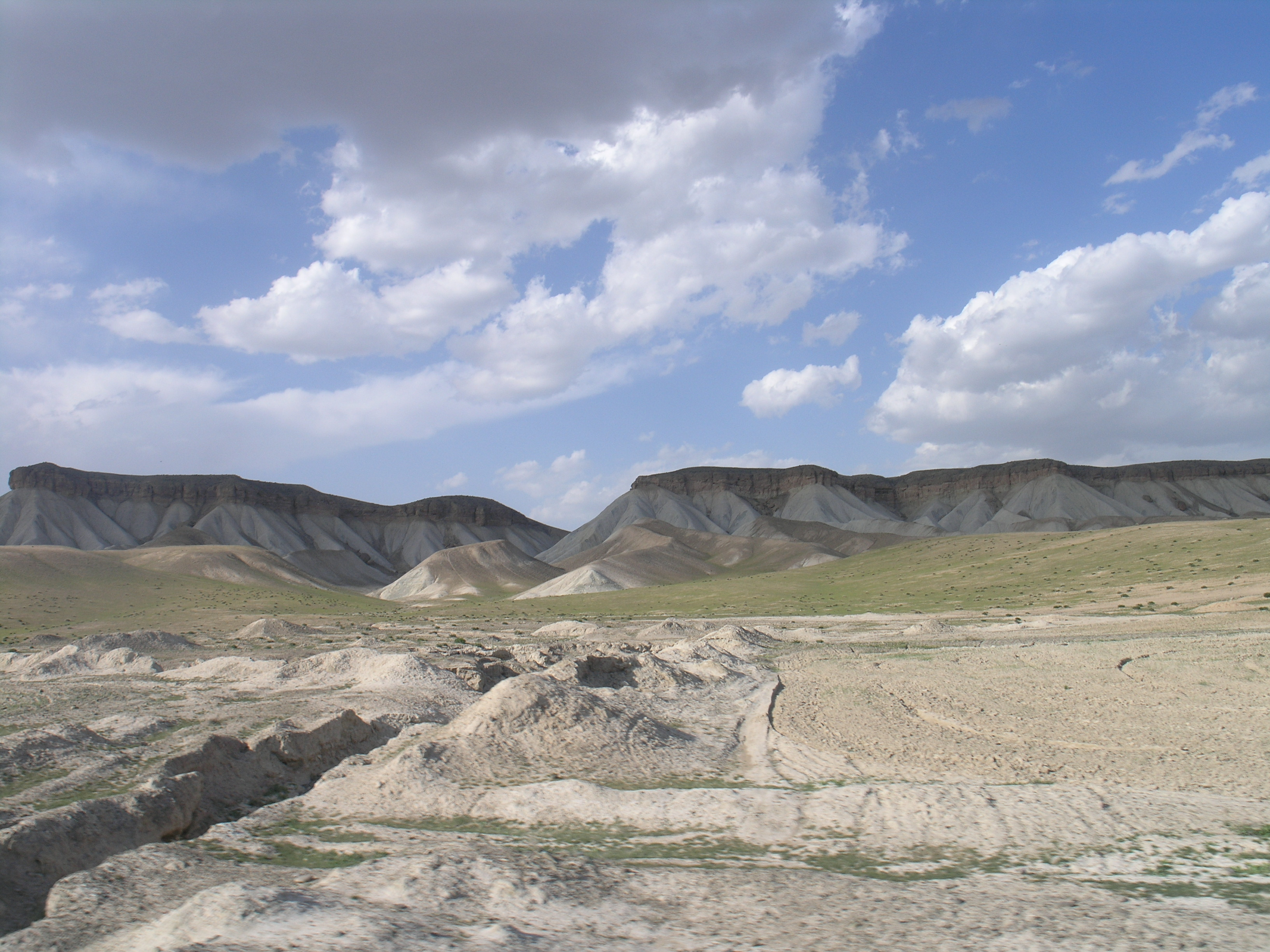
- Mountain range in Salehabad County

- Location of Salehabad County in Razavi Khorasan province (right, pink)

- Location of Razavi Khorasan province in Iran
- Coordinates: 35°40′N 60°55′E
- Country: Iran
- Province: Razavi Khorasan
- Established: 2018
- Capital: Salehabad
- Districts: Central, Jannatabad
- Time zone: UTC+3:30 (IRST)

Salehabad County (Persian: شهرستان صالح‌آباد) is in Razavi Khorasan province, Iran. Its capital is the city of Salehabad, whose population at the time of the 2016 National Census was 8,625 in 2,198 households.

== History ==
In 2018, Salehabad District was separated from Torbat-e Jam County in the establishment of Salehabad County, which was divided into two districts and five rural districts, with Salehabad as its capital and only city at the time. The village of Jannatabad was converted to a city in 2021.

== Demographics ==
=== Administrative divisions ===
Salehabad County's administrative structure is shown in the following table.

Salehabad County
Administrative Divisions
Central District
Bagh-e Keshmir RD
Qaleh Hamam RD
Salehabad RD
Salehabad (city)
Jannatabad District
Jannatabad RD
Ostay RD
Jannatabad (city) (Note: Became a city after the 2016 census)
RD = Rural District

== See also ==
Media related to Salehabad County at Wikimedia Commons
