= Salehabad District (Torbat-e Jam County) =

Former district in Razavi Khorasan province, Iran

Salehabad District Persian: بخش صالح‌آباد
- Former District
- Location within Iran
- Coordinates: 35°40′N 60°55′E
- Country: Iran
- Province: Razavi Khorasan
- County: Torbat-e Jam
- Capital: Salehabad

Population (2016)
  - Total: 43,426
- Time zone: UTC+3:30 (IRST)

Salehabad District (Persian: بخش صالح‌آباد) is a former administrative division of Torbat-e Jam County, Razavi Khorasan province, Iran. Its capital was the city of Salehabad.

== History ==
In 2018, the district was separated from the county in the establishment of Salehabad County.

== Demographics ==
=== Population ===
At the time of the 2006 National Census, the district's population was 43,212 in 9,496 households. The following census in 2011 counted 45,695 people in 11,095 households. The 2016 census measured the population of the district as 43,426 inhabitants in 11,485 households.

=== Administrative divisions ===
Salehabad District Population
Administrative Divisions	2006	2011	2016
Bagh-e Keshmir RD	10,011	10,379	10,607
Jannatabad RD	10,087	9,610	8,162
Qaleh Hamam RD	7,687	8,404	8,477
Salehabad RD	7,147	7,660	7,555
Salehabad (city)	8,280	9,642	8,625
Total	43,212	45,695	43,426
RD = Rural District
