= Iraj Mirza =

Iranian poet (1874 - 1926)

Iraj Mirza ایرج میرزا
- Jalāl ol-Mamālek
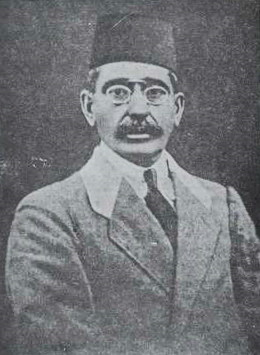
- Born: October 1874; Tabriz, Iran
- Died: 14 March 1926 (aged 51); Tehran, Iran
- Burial: Zahir-od-dowleh cemetery
- Issue: 3, Ja'afar Gholi Mirza, Khosrow Mirza, Robabeh
- Dynasty: Qajar
- Father: Gholam-Hossein Mirza
- Writing career
- Education: Tabriz Dar ul-Funun
- Occupations: Writer, poet
- Notable work: See details

Prince Iraj Mirza (Persian: ایرج میرزا, literally Prince Iraj; October 1874 – 14 March 1926), titled Jalāl-ol-Mamālek (Persian: جلال‌الممالک), was a prominent Iranian poet. He was the son of Prince Gholam-Hossein Mirza. Iraj Mirza was known for his modern poetry, which often critiqued traditional customs. In addition to his original works, he translated literary pieces from French into Persian.

== Early life ==
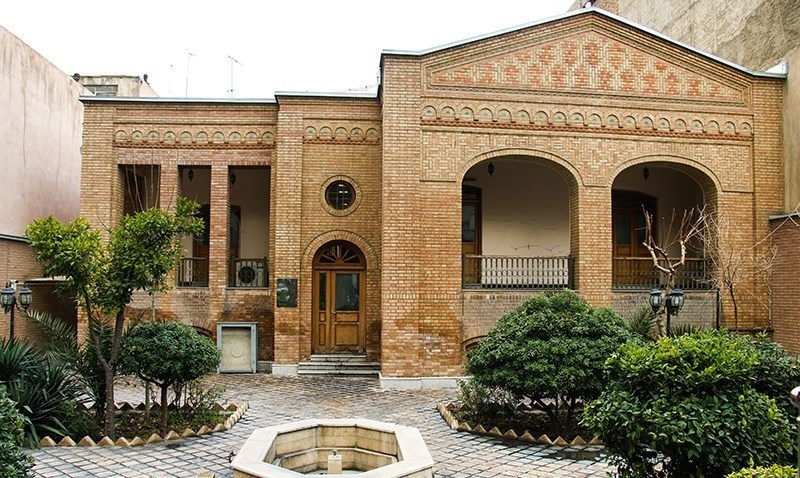
Iraj Mirza’s paternal house at 30 Tir Street, Tehran

Iraj Mirza was born in October 1874 in Tabriz, northwestern Iran. He was a great-grandson of Fath Ali Shah Qajar, the second shah of the Qajar dynasty (r. 1797–1834). His father, Prince Gholam-Hossein Mirza, was the son of Prince Malek Iraj Mirza, who was himself a son of Fath Ali Shah.

Gholam-Hossein Mirza served as the poet laureate, or official court poet, for Mozaffar al-Din Mirza in Tabriz, since traditionally, all Crown Princes during the Qajar era resided in Tabriz. Mozaffar al-Din Mirza, later known as Mozaffar al-Din Shah, the Crown Prince of Iran at the time, was the son of Naser al-Din Shah Qajar, the fourth shah of the Qajar dynasty (r. 1848–1896).

Although some sources suggest that Iraj was privately educated, reliable evidence indicates that he attended a branch of the Dār ol-fonoon (House of Sciences and Techniques) in Tabriz. By the age of 15, Iraj was fluent in Persian, French, Arabic, and Azerbaijani. He was also skilled in the art of calligraphy, with his handwriting being regarded as highly artistic. Iraj Mirza remains recognized as one of Iran's renowned calligraphers.

== Marriage and offices ==
In 1890, at the age of 16, Iraj Mirza married. By the age of 19, both his father and wife had died. Following his father's death, Iraj assumed the position of court poet for Mozaffar al-Din Mirza. In 1896, Mozaffar al-Din Mirza ascended to the throne as Mozaffar al-Din Shah and the 22 year old Iraj was given the title Head of Poets (Sadr o-Shoʻarā) (Persian: سردار الشعراء) and later received the title Jalāl ol-Mamālek.

A few years later, Iraj left the royal court and joined the Tabriz office of Ali Khan Amin al-Dowleh, the governor of Iranian Azarbaijan. During this period, he learned French and became familiar with Russian. In 1905, when Amin al-Dowleh was sent to Tehran, Iraj accompanied him and became involved in the Persian Constitutional Revolution. In 1907, Ahmad Ghavam (Qavam os-Saltaneh), a governmental authority, was assigned to Europe, and Iraj joined him. Two years later, Iraj returned to Tehran and began working as a staff member in the Office of Official Compositions (Dār ol-ʻenshā, Persian: دار الانشاء).

In 1915, Iraj's first son, Ja'afar Gholi Mirza, committed suicide due to psychological problems. In 1917, Iraj joined the newly established Ministry of Culture, and three years later, he transferred to the Ministry of Finance and Revenue. From 1920 to 1925, he served as a Revenue Officer in Mashhad, the capital city of Khorasan Province (now Razavi Khorasan), in northeastern Iran.

At the age of 51, Iraj returned to Tehran, where he died of a heart attack on March 14, 1926.

== Poems ==
Iraj is considered one of the famous contemporary poets of Iran and also as the first Iranian master of colloquial poetry. In his verses, he uses words from everyday speech. The origin of this tendency has come to be identified with his name. Through Iraj, poetic language was enriched with many colloquial words and expressions. His simple poetic language is also famous for its witticism and satire.

During Qajar era, Iraj was influenced by the Persian Constitutional Revolution (1906–1911) and by the changing circumstances in the country. This fact is manifested in the particular style of poetry that he created. Modern and imported concepts, combined with what were obtained from his own thoughts, form the framework of his style. He criticizes the social conditions of the country, and the striking originality in his use of metaphor when addressing diverse social problems has been admirable by his critics.

His style is rich in the art of simile. His striking sarcasm, pungent and fanged words are pointed at the dishonest clergy, businessmen, merchants and statesmen. In addition to those colloquial poems, Iraj also composed elegies to praise Mozaffar al-Din Shah, Hassan Ali Khan Garroosy (also known as Amir Nezam Garroosy, the governor of Iranian Azarbaijan (now East Azarbaijan and West Azarbaijan) and Kermanshah during the Qajar era), and many other Qajar personalities. His praise never shaded into flattery. Iraj also composed very nice massnawi and qat'aa on the raising and education of children, maternal affection, love and romance.

He was an enlightened and innovative poet, and tended towards European thought.

Despite his famous technical skills, he sometimes used similar cases of rhyme, which is considered by some poetry researchers to be an intentional rejection of strict traditional poetical rules. Although Iraj was one of the pioneers of the innovative movement in Persian poetry, he never thought of abandoning the rules of classical poetry. Some scholars believe that because of the time in which he lived, his depth of literary knowledge and his familiarity with French and other foreign languages, he could also have been one of the masters of free verse if he had wanted to.

He is particularly famous for his pederastic and satirical poetry.

Among many poems that Iraj composed, his well-known poems include Satan (Persian: Eblis; ابلیس), Mother (Persian: Mādar; مادر), A Letter to the Iranian poet, Aref Ghazvini (Persian: Ārefnāme; عارفنامه), Woman's Picture (Persian: Tasvir-e Zan; تصویر زن), Story of the Veil or Hijab (Persian: Hejāb; حجاب) and the Story of Zohreh and Manouchehr (Persian: Dāstan-e Zohre o Manučehr; داستان زهره و منوچهر), which is based on William Shakespeare's Venus and Adonis.

In Mother, the poet describes a child's affection for his/her mother and how the mother nurtures the child from birth onwards. The words Iraj uses are exquisitely descriptive and lovely not only in its original Persian but even in translated versions.

The Story of Zohreh and Manouchehr is one of his famous poetic works. Here Iraj tells the story based on the Greek myth of Venus and Adonis. In this poem, Zohreh leaves the gods and comes to Earth, where she is overcome by the pleasing charm of Manouchehr in his armor. He rejects her advances, while Zohreh attempts her first seduction. She goes to great pains to explain the beauty of sex, and she finally goes her own way as she returns to the gods.

On December 8, 2004, the last Iranian movies launched in France was The Story of Zohreh and Manouchehr directed by Mitra Farahani. The film had already participated in the Berlin film festival and several other international events and attracted many viewers.

Iraj believed that the status of Iranian women at his time was reminiscent of the Dark Ages. He was affected by what he saw as the difficult and restrictive lifestyles of women and raised attention to them through scenes of their daily lives in his poems.

== Tomb ==
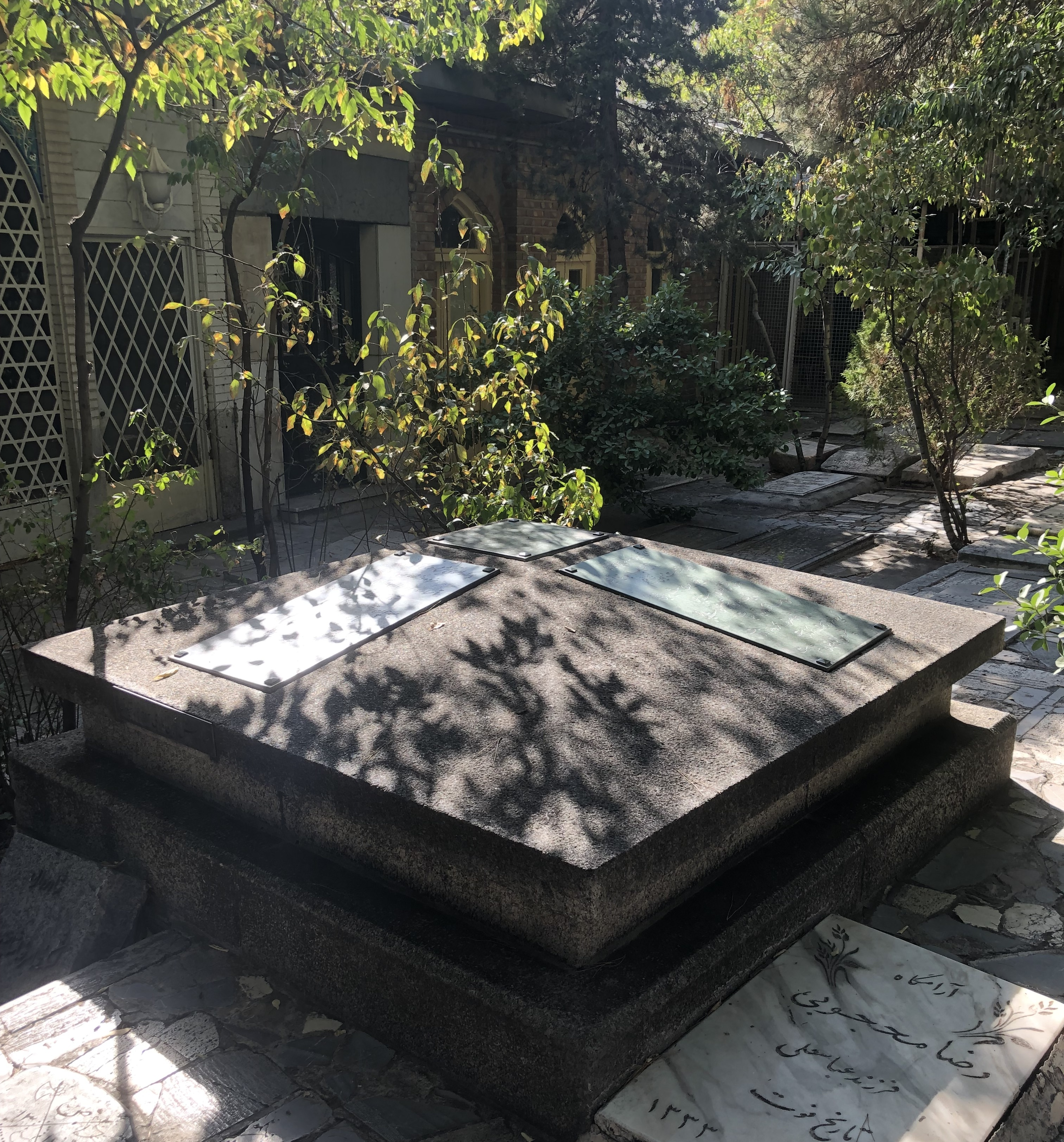
Iraj Mirza's tomb

His tomb is in Zahir-od-dowleh cemetery between Darband and Tajrish located in Shemiran, north of Tehran.

== Works ==
- Diwan (collection of poems)
- Masnavi of Zohreh-o Manuchehr (not completed)
- Masnavi of Aref-nameh
- Iraj Literary Works
- Romeo and Juliet (Translation from French)

== Legacy ==
In recent years, two of Iraj Mirza's poems have been adapted into music:

1. The first poem, a short piece about the similarity between a lover and a Haji (a person who has completed the annual Muslim pilgrimage), has been performed by two different generations of Iranian musicians. The artists are Habib, with the song "Gheble Nama," and Sobhan Ganji, with the 2023 song "To Sanam."

2. The second poem, known for its creative use of proverbs in each line, was performed by Sobhan Ganji as the track "Che Ajab Shod" in his album "Dore Doori."
