= Tadj al-Saltaneh =

Qajar princess (1884–1936)

Taj al-Saltaneh
- Photograph by Mehdi Rusi Khan Ivanov
- Born: 1884; Tehran, Sublime State of Persia
- Died: 25 January 1936 (aged 51–52); Tehran, Imperial State of Iran
- Burial: Zahir-od-dowleh cemetery
- Spouse: Hassan Khan al-Saltaneh (c. 1894– c. 1900); Qollar-Aqasi Bashi (c. 1909–?); Isa Khan Majd al-Saltaneh Amirsoleimani
Names
- Tāj al-Salṭanah تاج‌السلطنه
- Dynasty: Qajar
- Father: Naser al-Din Shah Qajar
- Mother: Tooran al-Saltaneh

Zahra Khanoum, known by her title Taj al-Saltaneh (Persian: زهرا خانم تاج السلطنه; 1884 – 25 January 1936) was the famous daughter of Iran's monarch Naser al-Din Shah. She was an Iranian princess and member of the Qajar dynasty of Iran. She was a renowned feminist, women's rights activist, and the first woman in Iran to write a memoir. Her father was one of Iran's longest reigning monarchs, Naser al-Din Shah, the Shah ruled over Iran from 1848 to May 1896. Taj Saltaneh was the love interest of poet Yousef Abdu Aref Qazvini who wrote his poem Fe eh ya Qajar for her. Her mother was also a Qajar princess and the fourth legal wife of Nasser al-Din Shah.

== Life ==
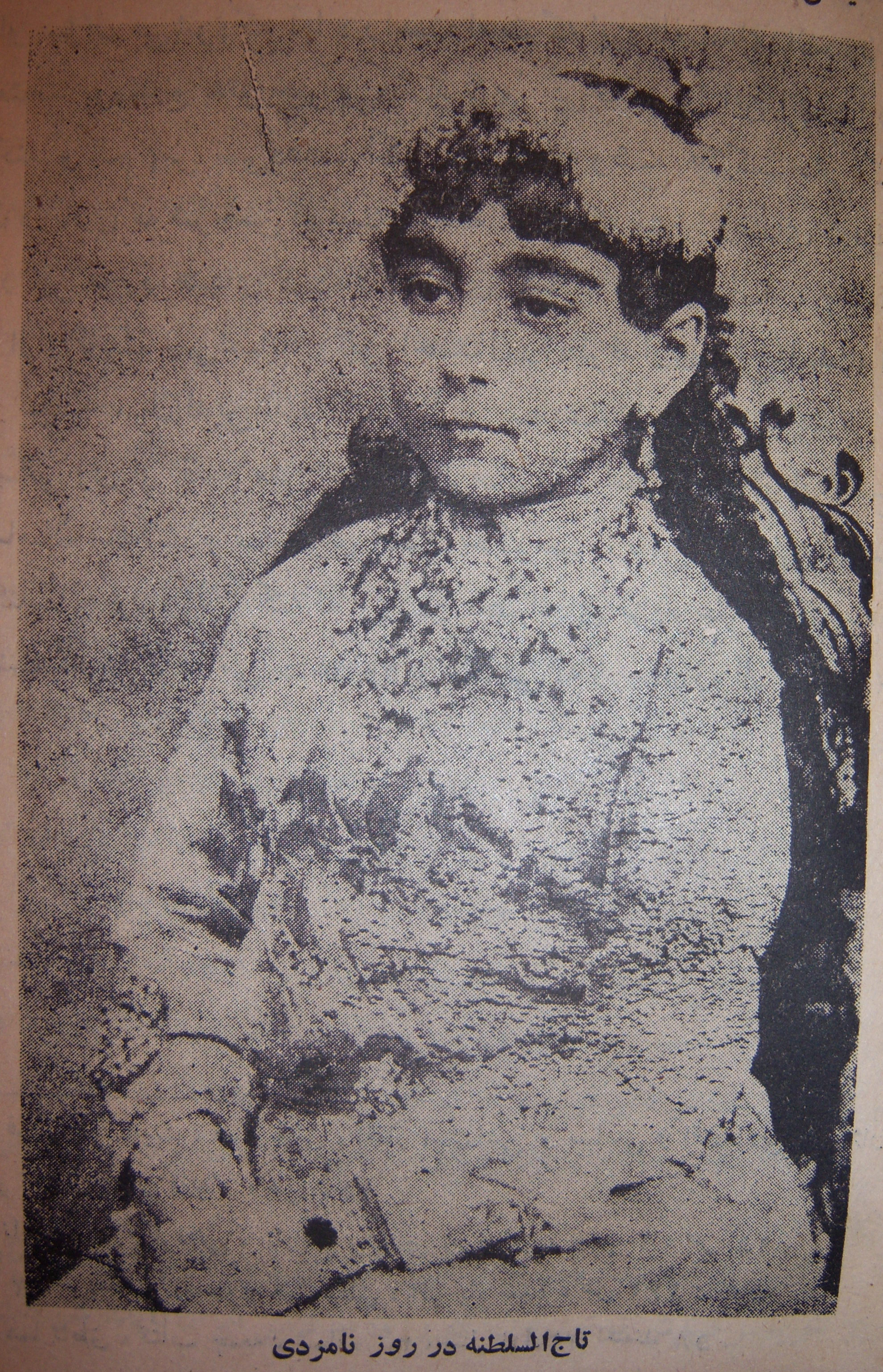
Taj al-Saltaneh on her engagement day, aged 10; c. 1894

In her memoir, published in Persian and English, titled "Crowning Anguish" she describes her upbringing in the royal harem, using details of court rules, the relations between royal court and the public and more. Her views described in her book were progressive and ahead of her time. She writes that a society can not progress if half of its population- women- are not educated and not in the work force. She heavily criticized Qajar society and the limitations Iranian women faced. She describes her understanding of the successful plot and assassination of her father in 1896.

She was married at age 13 to Sardar Hassan Shojah al-Saltaneh, an aristocrat and the son of the defense minister Shojah al-Saltaneh. They had four children. Taj divorced her husband, breaking a taboo and becoming one of the first women in the royal family to get a divorce.

The account also includes the pain from her husband's extramarital affairs.

In her later years, she dedicated her life to writing, reading and raising her beloved granddaughter Taj-Iran, with whom she had a special bond and heavily influenced her upbringing. She lived with her daughter Tooran al-Dowleh until she died.

=== Pioneer ===
She was a writer, a painter, an intellectual, and an activist who hosted literary salons at her house once a week. She was fluent in Arabic and French and played the violin. She was the first woman in court to wear western clothes. She was also the first to write a memoir and a vocal critic of the monarchy under her father Naser al-Din Shah and brother Mozaffar ad-Din Shah's rule. She blamed many of Iran's problems then, including poverty, lack of education for masses and women's rights, on incompetent monarchs. Her voice was a lone female voice advocating for change and democracy.

=== Feminism ===
Taj al-Saltaneh was a trailblazer for women's rights in Iran and a feminist. She was a founding member of Iran's underground women's rights group Women's Freedom Association, working for equal rights for women circa 1910. She secretly organized and attended underground women's rights meetings telling her children and grandchildren that she was attending religious sessions. She once led a women's rights march to parliament and was an avid supporter of Iran's constitutional revolution.

=== Anti-slavery opinion ===
Taj al-Saltaneh was raised by a staff of African slaves, as was the custom who were referred to as "bond servants", and expressed sympathy for them and dislike of the system of slavery in her memoirs:

The nanny specifically had to be a slave since honor and grandeur at that time were measured by ownership of creatures whom God has made no differently from others, except for the color of their skin a distinction that in all honesty does not exist at the divine threshold. These poor people were kept in captivity and abject submission, made the instruments of their owners’ greatness, and called “bond servants”. They were bought and sold like so much cattle.

== Memoirs ==
Her memoirs were published under the title of Crowning Anguish: Memoirs of a Persian Princess from the Harem to Modernity 1884 – 1914 (1996), edited with a preface by Abbas Amanat and translated by Anna Vanzan and Amin Neshati. They were well received, the Times Literary Supplement describing them thus: "In somewhat unusual and cumbersome style, Taj's memoirs, written in 1914, cover a thirty-year span of a rapidly changing era [...] A curious blend of the reconstructive and reflective, Taj al Saltaneh's memoirs bring home the intense conflicts of a life straddling the harem and modernism." (March 4, 1994) Nesta Ramazaini's review in The Middle East Journal praised the book's open description of the daily life and political infighting in the Qajar harem.

Her hand-written memoir remained unpublished until 60 years after her death, and is currently in the archives of Iran's National Library.

== Legacy ==
She is buried in the Zahir-od-dowleh Cemetery in Tajrish a cemetery dedicated to notable intellectuals, writers and artists of Iran. Her life and her writing and her role as a feminist is a subject of Middle Eastern studies in universities from Tehran University to Harvard. In 2015, Harvard acquired from her descendants and granddaughter TajIran their family photos, writings, anecdotes and stories about Taj al-Saltaneh's life for its archives. Her descendants from her four children are scattered all over the world and include great-great granddaughters journalist Farnaz Fassihi, and German senior official Honey Deihimi, international lawyer Sebastian Lehmann, among others.

== See also ==
- Farnaz Fassihi
