= Zahir-od-dowleh cemetery =

Cemetery in Darband, Tehran, Iran

Coordinates: 35°48′43″N 51°26′01″E

- گورستان ظهیرالدوله (Persian)
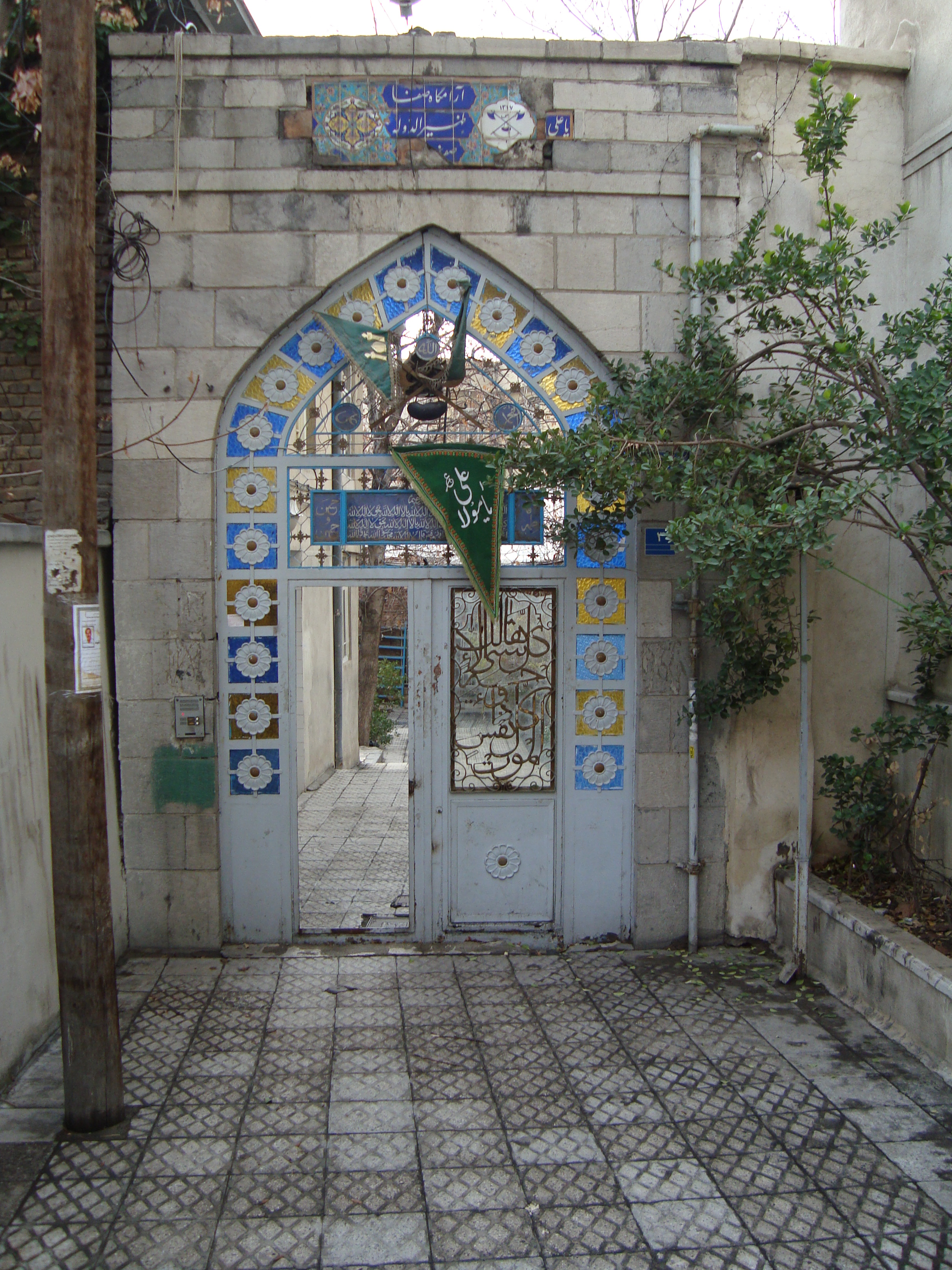
- Zahir-od-dowleh cemetery
- Interactive map of Zahir-od-dowleh cemetery
- Type: Cemetery
- Location: Shemiranat, Tehran, Iran

Zahir-od-dowleh Cemetery (Persian: ظهيرالدوله) is located in Darband, close to Tajrish, Shemiran (now a neighbourhood inside Tehran's city limits). It serves as the final resting place for numerous Iranian artists, poets, and musicians.

== History ==
Ali Khan Zahir od-Dowleh, head of the Society of Brotherhood (Anjoman-e Okhovat) died from a heart attack on Friday 27 June 1924, in his garden in Jafarabad, Shemiran. He was interred in a public cemetery near his garden, located between Tajrish and Imamzadeh Qasim in Shemiran. This site was previously home to an old cemetery, and later the Zahir-od-Dowleh Khanqah (Safa' alishah) was relocated to this place. Following Zahir-od-Dowleh's burial, his disciples named the old cemetery and khanqah "Zahir-od-Dowleh Safa Ali Cemetery."

The burial site of Zahir-od-Dowleh was situated beneath a tree known as "Daghdaghan," where he often sat during his lifetime. Before his burial, he was ritually washed by Mowlavi Rashti, who was also later buried at the same site. The Society of Brotherhood (Anjoman-e Okhovat) enclosed this public cemetery, officially naming it "Zahir-od-Dowleh Safa Ali Cemetery."

Owing to Zahir-od-Dowleh Safa Ali's popularity among various social classes, numerous artists, politicians, and scholars requested to be buried in this cemetery. As a result, the khanqah custodians and Zahir-od-Dowleh's disciples garnered considerable revenue from selling burial plots.

From the 1960s onward, burials in this complex were prohibited, with exceptions granted through special permits and in limited numbers during the 1960s and 1970s. The last burial at Zahir-od-Dowleh Safa Ali Cemetery occurred in 1979, with the interment of General Ali Neshat.

== Notable burials ==
- Ali Khan Zahir od-Dowleh (1864–1924) – Sufi leader
- Gholamhossein Darvish (1872–1926) – musician
- Prince Iraj Mirza (1874–1926) – Qajar prince and poet
- Seifeddin Kermanshahi (fa) (1876–1932) – playwright
- Princess Zahra Khanom Taj os-Saltaneh (1883–1936) – Qajar princess
- Habib Samaei (1905–1941) – musician
- Sharafeddin Qahramani (fa) (1900–1942) – author
- Musa Hakimi Nazm os-Saltaneh (fa) (1864–1944) – constitutionalist
- Hassan-Ali Mostashar Mostashar ol-Molk (fa) (1879–1945) – politician
- Mohammad Masoud (ru) (1901–1947) – journalist
- Prince Mohammad-Sadegh Morza Moezz od-Dowleh (fa) (1866–1948) – Qajar prince
- Mohammd-Hossein Loghman Adham (fa) (1879–1950) – physician
- Mohammad Taqi Bahar (1884–1951) – poet and scholar
- Gholamreza Rashid Yasemi (1895–1951) – poet
- Hossein Hangafarin (fa) (1875–1952) – musician
- Reza Mahjubi (1898–1954) – musician
- Hossein Taherzadeh (fa) (1882–1955) – singer
- Hassan Loghman Adham (fa) (1884–1957) – politician
- Abolhasan Saba (1902–1957) – musician
- Qamar-ol-Moluk Vaziri (1905–1959) – singer
- Dariush Rafiei (fa) (1927–1959) – singer
- Esmail Marzban (fa) (1867–1960) – politician
- Mohammad-Mehdi Obehi (fa) (1873–1960) – politician
- Hossein Saba (fa) (1924–1960) – musician
- Fazlollah Mohtadi Sobhi (fa) (1897–1962) – writer
- Nosratollah Montaser (fa) (1899–1965) – mayor of Teheran
- Morteza Mahjoubi (1899–1965) – musician
- Ruhollah Khaleqi (1906–1965) – musician
- Ahmad Nakhjavan (1893–1966) – IIAF general and chief of staff (1925–36)
- Forough Farrokhzad (1934–1966) – poet
- Hossein Masrour (fa) (1890–1968) – writer
- Hossein Yahaghi (fa) (1903–1968) – musician
- Mohammad-Hassan Rahi Moayyeri (1909–1968) – poet
- Hassan Taqizadeh (1876–1969) – politician and veteran constitutionalist
- Masoud Moazed (fa) (d. 1969) – politician
- Ebrahim Mansouri (fa) (1899–1969) – musician
- Moshir Homayoun Shahrdar (fa) (1885–1970) – musician
- Jahanbakht Tofigh (1931–1970) – wrestler
- Fazl'ollah Mohtadi Sobhi (1897–1962) – Author
- Ali Eghbal (fa) (1899–1972) – politician
- Mohammad Ameri (fa) (1889–1973) – politician
- Hossein Tehrani (1912–1974) – musician
- Ahmad Vosough (fa) (1899–1975) – IIA general
- Farid Khaz'al (fa) (1927–1975) – IIN general
- Nasrollah Saba (fa) (1886–1977) – politician
- Giti Amir-Khosravi (fa) (1895–1977) – musician
- Nur-Ali Borumand (de) (1905–1977) – musician
- Fazael Tadayon (1908–1977) – IIAF general and chief of staff (1975–77)
- Ali Neshat (1923–1979) – Imperial Guard general

== Gallery ==
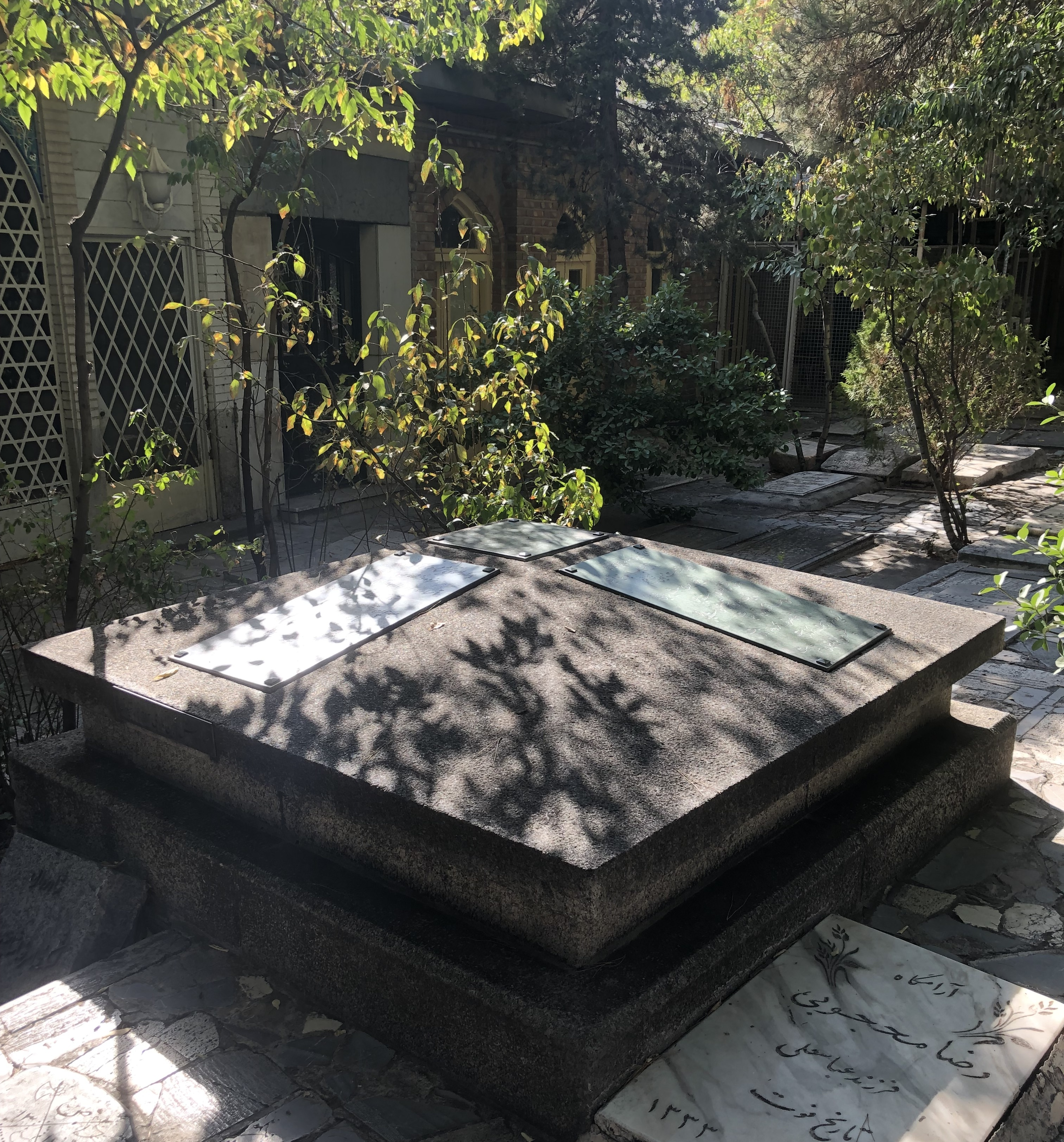
Iraj Mirza

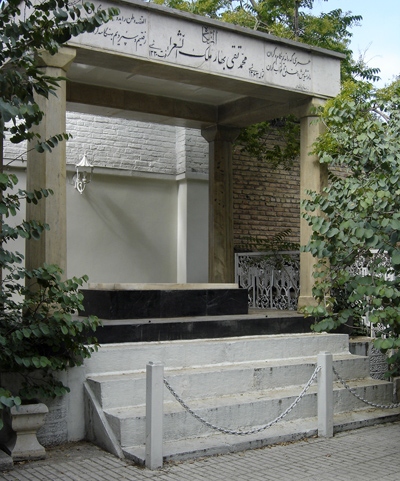
Mohammad-Taqi Bahar (Malak o-Sh'sho'arā)

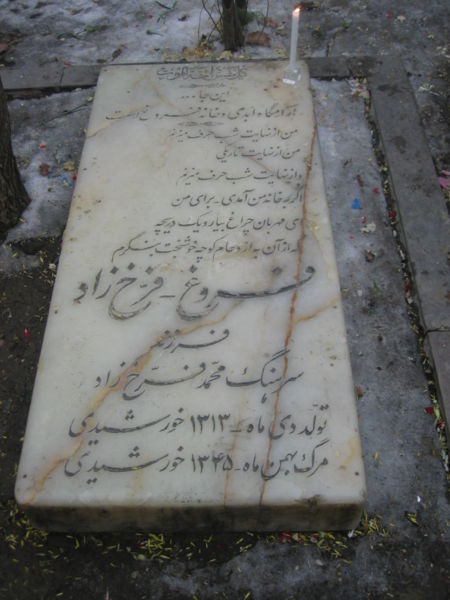
Forough Farrokhzad

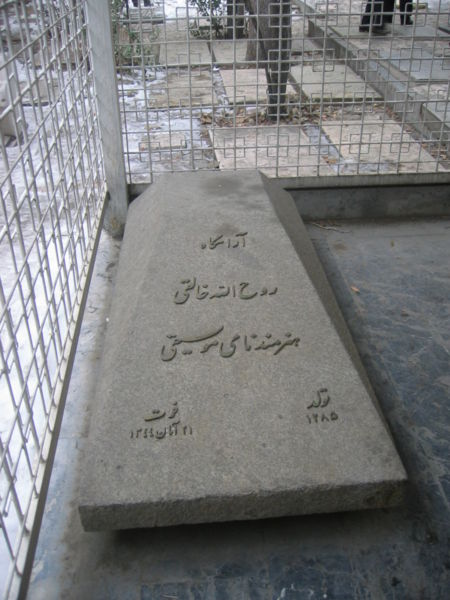
Ruhollah Khaleqi

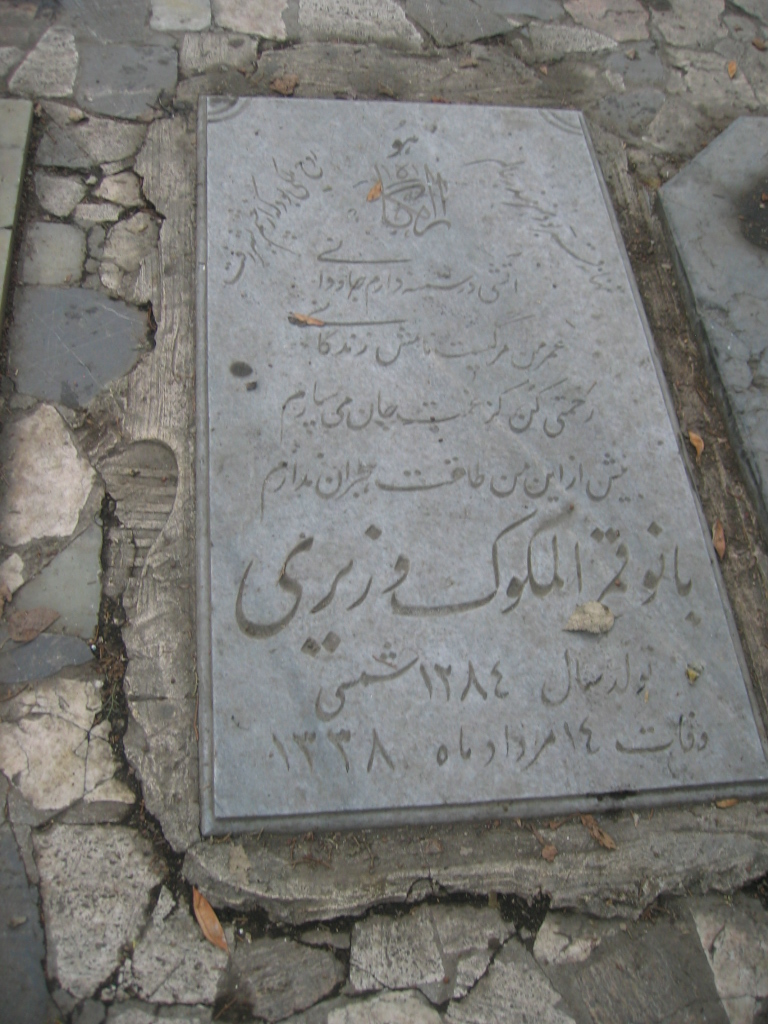
Qamar ol-Molouk Vaziri
