= Rahi Mo'ayyeri =

Iranian poet and musician (1909–1968)

- رهی معیری
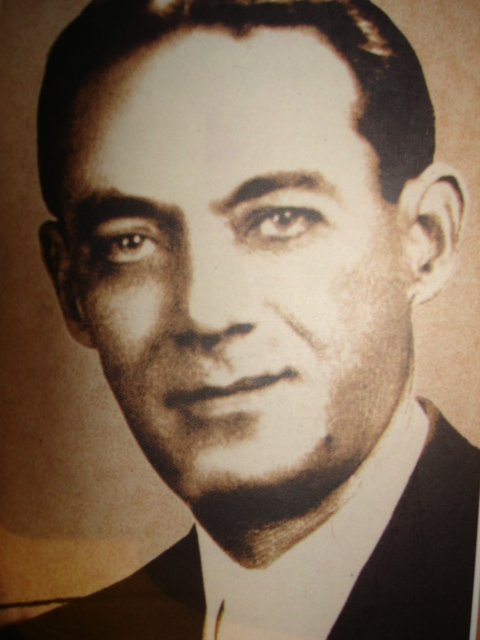
- Born: Mohammad Hasan Mo'ayyeri; 30 April 1909; Tehran, Sublime State of Iran
- Died: 15 November 1968 (aged 59); Tehran, Imperial State of Iran
- Resting place: Zahir-od-dowleh cemetery
- Citizenship: Iranian
- Known for: Poet

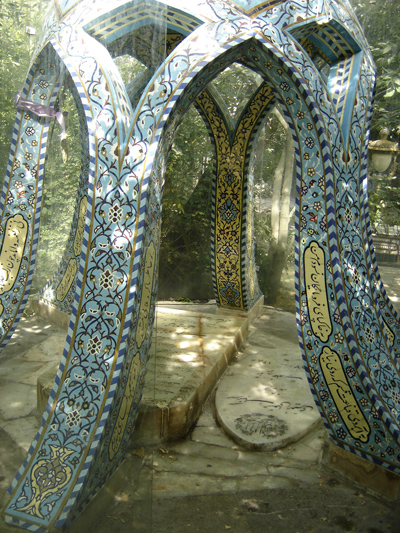
Rahi Mo'ayeri's tomb is enclosed by a glass case at Darband Shemiran, Tehran.

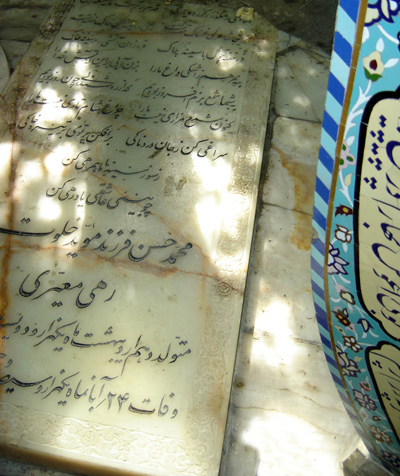
Rahi Mo'ayeri's tomb is adorned with his poetry.

Rahi Mo'ayeri (Persian: رهی معیری; 30 April 1909 – 15 November 1968), né: Mohammad Hasan Mo'ayyeri (Persian: محمد حسن معیری), was an Iranian poet and musician.

Rahi Mo'ayyeri, born on 30 April 1909, in Tehran, emerged from a family deeply rooted in the arts and music. His uncle, the renowned Qajar era poet Foroughi Bastami, was a notable influence. Rahi began his poetic journey at the age of seventeen, adopting "Rahi" as his pen name. He extensively studied Persian literature's great masters, with a particular admiration for Saadi, whose impact is evident in his works.

In addition to his poetry, Rahi was also a talented composer. His collaboration with prominent musicians began in 1941 when he met Ruhollah Khaleqi. From this partnership, Rahi became the lyricist for many of Khaleqi's compositions as well as those of Morteza Mahjoubi, Ali Tajvidi, Hossein Yahaqqi, Moussa Maroufi, and Javad Maroufi. Khaleqi praised Rahi's exceptional skill in aligning words with music.

Rahi's literary contributions include several published collections: Saye-ye Omr (1964; Persian: سایه عمر), Azadeh (1974; Persian: آزاده), and Javdaneh Rahi (1984; Persian: جاودانه رهی). His deep friendship with Davood Pirnia, the founder of the Golha Program, led to significant collaborations with Morteza Mahjoubi on this influential music platform. Many consider the late 1950s and 1960s the golden age of Persian music, a period during which Rahi played a pivotal role.

Following Pirnia's resignation, Rahi took over the management of the Golha Program, continuing until his health declined. Despite the romantic nature of his poetry, Rahi never married. In a 1960 interview with Taghi Rouhani, he famously remarked, "when marriage comes from a door, love will leave from another door".

One of Rahi's final notable works was Golhayeh Rangarang #470, performed by Hayedeh with music composed by maestro Tajvidi. This song is credited with catapulting Hayedeh to fame.

His collection Sayeh Omr (Persian: سایه عمر, lit. 'The Shadow of Life') of poems was printed in 1964.

He died on 15 November 1968, in Tehran. He is buried in Zahir-od-dowleh cemetery, northern Tehran.

== Notes ==
دیدی که رسوا شد دلم، غرق تمنا شد دلم

دیدی که من با این دل بی آرزو عاشق شدم

با آن همه آزادگی، بر زلف او عاشق شدم

ای وای اگر صیاد من، غافل شود از یاد من، قدرم نداند

فریاد اگر از کوی خود، وز رشته‌ی گیسوی خود، بازم رهاند

در پیش بی دردان چرا، فریاد بی‌حاصل کنم

گر شکوه‌ای دارم ز دل، با یار صاحبدل کنم

وای ز دردی که درمان ندارد

فتادم به راهی که پایان ندارد

شنیدم بوی او، مستانه رفتم سوی او

تا چون غبار کوی او، در کوی جان منزل کند

وای ز دردی که درمان ندارد

فتادم به راهی که پایان ندارد

دیدی که رسوا شد دلم، غرق تمنا شد دلم

دیدی که در گرداب غم، از فتنه‌ی گردون رهی

افتادم و سرگشته چون، امواج دریا شد دلم

دیدی که رسوا شد دلم، غرق تمنا شد دلم

== See also ==
- Persian literature
