= Farnaz Fassihi =

Iranian-American journalist

- Born: Farnaz Fassihi Shirazi; 1971 (age 54–55); United States
- Citizenship: American, Iranian
- Education: Columbia University
- Occupation: Journalist

Farnaz Fassihi (Persian: فرناز فصیحی; born 1971) is an Iranian-American journalist who has worked for The New York Times since 2019. She is the United Nations bureau chief and also writes about Iranian news. Previously she was a senior writer for The Wall Street Journal for 17 years and a conflict reporter based in the Middle East.

Fassihi's memoir, Waiting for An Ordinary Day, is based on her four years covering the Iraq War and witnessing the unraveling of social life for Iraqi citizens.

== Early life and education ==
Farnaz Fassihi was born in 1971 in the United States to Iranian parents. She attended a British elementary school in Tehran, Iran before the Iranian Revolution and attended middle school and Lake Oswego High School in Portland, Oregon in the US.

She attended college in Iran because her family decided to return to Iran. She majored in English. While in college she became friends with Nazila Fathi.

She earned a Master of Journalism from the Graduate School of Journalism at Columbia University in New York City.

From 2014 to 2015, as a Nieman Fellow at Harvard University Fassihi studied the use of technology by the Islamic Revolutionary Guard Corps.

== Family ==
Fassihi is the great great granddaughter of Tadj al-Saltaneh.

== Careers ==
=== Early career ===
Fassihi worked as an investigative reporter and roving foreign correspondent for The Star-Ledger of Newark, New Jersey. She covered the September 11 attacks on the World Trade Center, the war in Afghanistan, Second Palestinian Intifada and Iraq under Saddam Hussein for The Star-Ledger. She was also a reporter for The Providence Journal in Rhode Island covering local news.

She worked as a stringer for Western media organizations in Iran, including The New York Times at the age of 19, when she was studying in Iran.

=== The Wall Street Journal ===
Fassahi spent 17 years covering wars and uprisings across the Middle East as a senior writer and war correspondent for The Wall Street Journal, based Baghdad, Iraq, and then in Beirut, Lebanon, from 2003 to 2006, as deputy bureau chief for Middle East and Africa. She was sent to Afghanistan to cover the US-led invasion there, and covered topics such as elections in Zimbabwe, war in Gaza and the Arab Spring protests. She was one of the lead reporters for The Journal's 2011 award-winning investigative project titled "Censorship Inc.," a series of enterprise stories examining how western technology enabled censorship in authoritarian countries.

In 2004 she became more widely known, after a private email she had written to family and friends about the deteriorating situation in Iraq went viral on the Internet. It included criticism of U.S. activities in Iraq, saying "The genie of terrorism, chaos, and mayhem has been unleashed... as a result of American mistakes". It was published in newspapers, websites and blogs around the world and became the subject of a Doonesbury cartoon. The email later became the kernel of her book about life in Iraq for ordinary Iraqis, Waiting for an Ordinary Day (2008), and was published in full in the book.

Moving back to the United States, she worked in WSJ's Washington, D.C. office from 2015 to 2019, covering US foreign policy and diplomacy at the United Nations.

=== The New York Times ===
Fassihi joined The New York Times as a reporter in July 2019, based in New York City.

In November 2019, Fassihi was one of the reporters on a joint investigative project, "The Iran Cables", between the NY Times and The Intercept about the discovery of intelligence cables which revealed how Iran wields influence in Iraq.

In December 2019 Fassihi reported on an uprising in Iran and broke the story of the massacre of people in Mahshahr. One month later she reconstructed in detail how the Islamic Revolutionary Guards Corps shot down Ukraine International Airlines Flight 752, a passenger plane, with missiles on a night that the U.S. and Iran went to the brink of war, and lied about it for three days. That reporting faced criticism from the victims' families and Iranian dissidents. Critics argued her initial reports, which suggested that President Hassan Rouhani was unaware of it, mirrored the official narrative of the Islamic Republic.

In October 2020, Fassihi's investigation into Iran's MeToo movement revealed allegations of sexual misconduct against prominent artist Aydin Aghdashloo.

In August 2021, it was reported that Fassihi had been the target of a series of cyber attacks and violent threats by certain Iranian opposition groups and internet trolls over several months. She was doxxed and threatened with death and rape. On August 7, The New York Times released a statement on Twitter condemning the attacks. The Overseas Press Club, where Fassihi was a board member, put out a supportive statement on August 9. On the same day, The Coalition For Women In Journalism condemned the attacks, which they called "deeply gendered and misogynistic".

In September 2021, the National Union for Democracy in Iran published a complaint to the New York Times about Fassihi's reporting. The complaint condemned online threats, but also accused Fassihi of "unprofessional conduct and inaccurate reporting".

In October 2021, an open letter by academics, journalists and activists addressed Fassihi and the New York Times for fake news reports, DARVO, and "normalizing the Islamic Republic’s brutality". The New York Times Editorial board, public relations and Fassihi rebutted it in an official public statement.

In April 2022, The New York Times announced that Fassihi would be covering the United Nations in addition to continuing to cover Iran.

An article published on July 6, 2025 by Fassihi and two co-authors claimed that "100 transgender inmates [were] missing" after an Israeli airstrike on an Iranian prison. An investigation done by Die Tageszeitung questioned the claim. The investigation stated that the original source of the claim denied ever saying it. Both the New York Times and Fassihi declined to comment on or correct the original article.

After Iran's President Masoud Pezeshkian spoke at the U.N. General Assembly in New York City on September 24, 2025, The New York Times issued a statement: "Journalist Farnaz Fassihi has been the subject of a serious disinformation campaign, which falsely claims she attended a private meeting with the President of Iran to discuss geopolitical strategy during his visit [...] / We condemn malicious attempts to smear Ms. Fassihi's reputation and damage her credibility."

Fassihi has repeatedly reported on her direct access to senior members of the Islamic Republic of Iran. In a 2026 article Fassihi reported that she conducted interviews with five senior Iranian officials, two clerics, two members of the Supreme Leader's office, and three members of the IRGC.

== Recognition and awards ==
- 2000: For EgyptAir Flight 990 crash
  - The New England News Executive Award-First place for General News category
  - Livingston Award for young journalists—Finalist
- 2006: For Iraq coverage
  - Henry Pringle Lecture Award—Columbia University's Graduate School of Journalism for reporting with the most impact in shaping policy in Washington. Fassihi is the youngest person honored with the award.
- 2011: For "Censorship Inc." (Team award)
  - Malcolm Forbes Award—The Overseas Press Club's Best International Business Reporting
  - Investigate Award—from Society of American Business Editors and Writers
- 2010: For "Hearts, Minds and Blood: the battle for Iran"
  - Robert F. Kennedy Award for best international reporting in print
  - Overseas Press Club's Hal Boyle Award—for Best newspaper or news service reporting from abroad
  - Payne Award for Ethics in Journalism from University of Oregon
  - Taylor Family Award for Fairness and Accuracy in print Journalism from Harvard University
  - Sigma Delta Chi Award for Best International Reporting from The Society of Professional Journalists
  - National Journalism Award for Best Reporting in Print from the Asian American Journalists Association
- 2015: Career Award for coverage of Middle East
  - The Marie Colvin Front Page Award for Foreign Correspondence
- 2015: Nieman fellow at Harvard University
- 2018: recipient of an Ellis Island Medal of Honor for distinguished contribution to American society

== Other roles ==
Fassihi's essays have been published by Harvard University's Nieman Reports magazine and Columbia Journalism Review. She has been a guest speaker on panels and journalism classes and a commentator for television and radio news shows on CNN, MSNBC, BBC, WNYC, PBS, Charlie Rose and National Public Radio in the United States.

Fassihi has served as a judge for the annual Overseas Press Club's awarda, and as of September 2021 was serving on the OPC board.

She was a member of the Dag Hammarskjöld Fund For Journalists board for four years, and of the United Nations Correspondents Association from 2017 to 2019. She is also a member of the New York Chapter of the Iranian American Women Foundation.

She was selected by Microsoft Teams in 2019 as a leader to be featured in a documentary called Art of the Team, which featured a group of a dozen leaders from different fields, including scientists, Olympic athletes, CEOs and designers. Microsoft Teams uses Fassihi's interview in training sessions for corporations for team building and conflict resolution.

== Books ==
=== Monograph ===
- Waiting for An Ordinary Day: the Unraveling of Life in Iraq (2008)—Fassihi's memoir of four years spent covering the Iraq war, and its impact on ordinary Iraqis

=== Contributing author ===
- Women's Letters, America from the Revolutionary War to the Present—Fassihi's famous email from Iraq is included in this anthology of historical letters written by American women.
- What Orwell Didn’t Know, Propaganda and the New Face of American Politics—Fassihi contributed an essay about the Iraq War and US administration's propaganda.
- Eating Mud Crabs in Kandahar: Stories of Food during Wartime by the World's Leading Correspondents—Fassihi contributed a chapter on sharing meals in Iran with student activists.

== See also ==
- Negar Mortazavi
