= Darband, Tehran =

Tourist area in the Alborz mountain range

Coordinates: 35°49′23.92″N 51°25′30.1″E

Darband(Persian: دربند, [dæɾˈbænd]), formerly a village close to Tajrish, Shemiran, is a neighborhood inside Tehran's metropolitan limits. It is the beginning of a hiking trail into Mount Tochal, which towers over Tehran. The Persian term darband translates to "door of the mountain" (band, a variation of vand and fand, meaning "mountain").

The start of the trail at Darband is about 250 metres long and is dotted with a number of small cafes and restaurants.These are quite popular and are busy in the evenings, as locals and tourists alike visit the many hooka lounges along the trail. The Zahir-od-dowleh cemetery is also located in Darband.

== Gallery ==
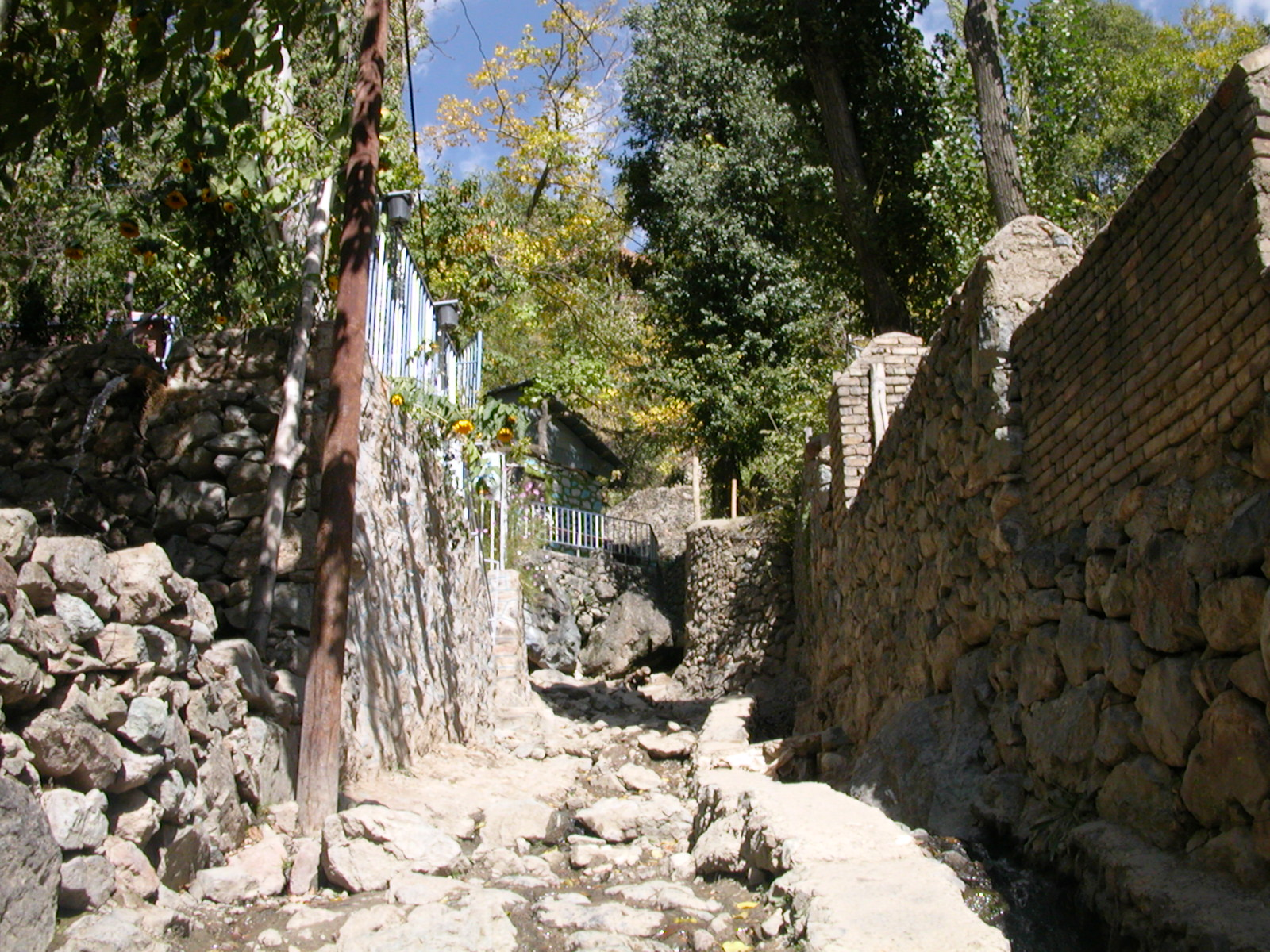
A steep path in Darband

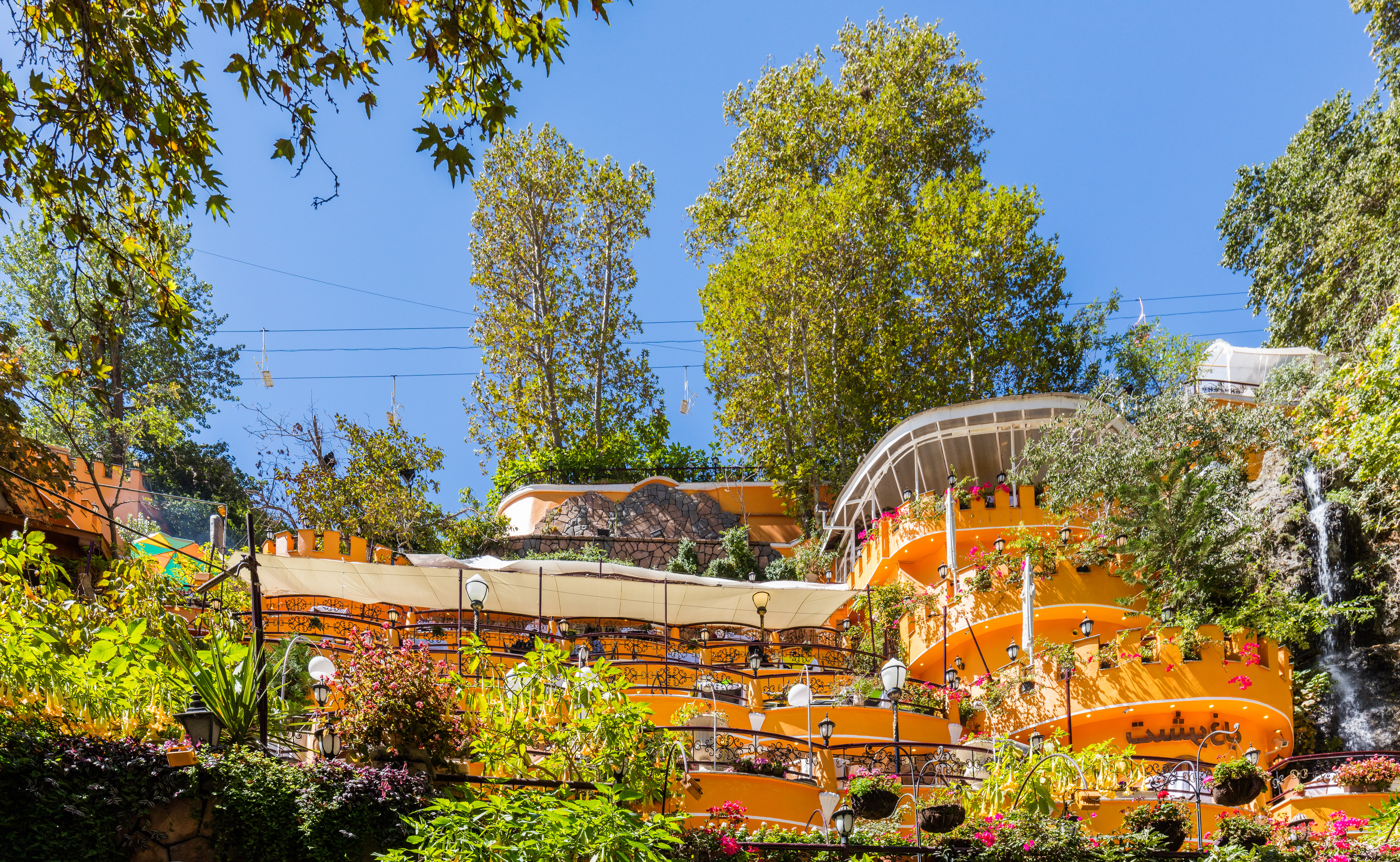
A cafe in Darband

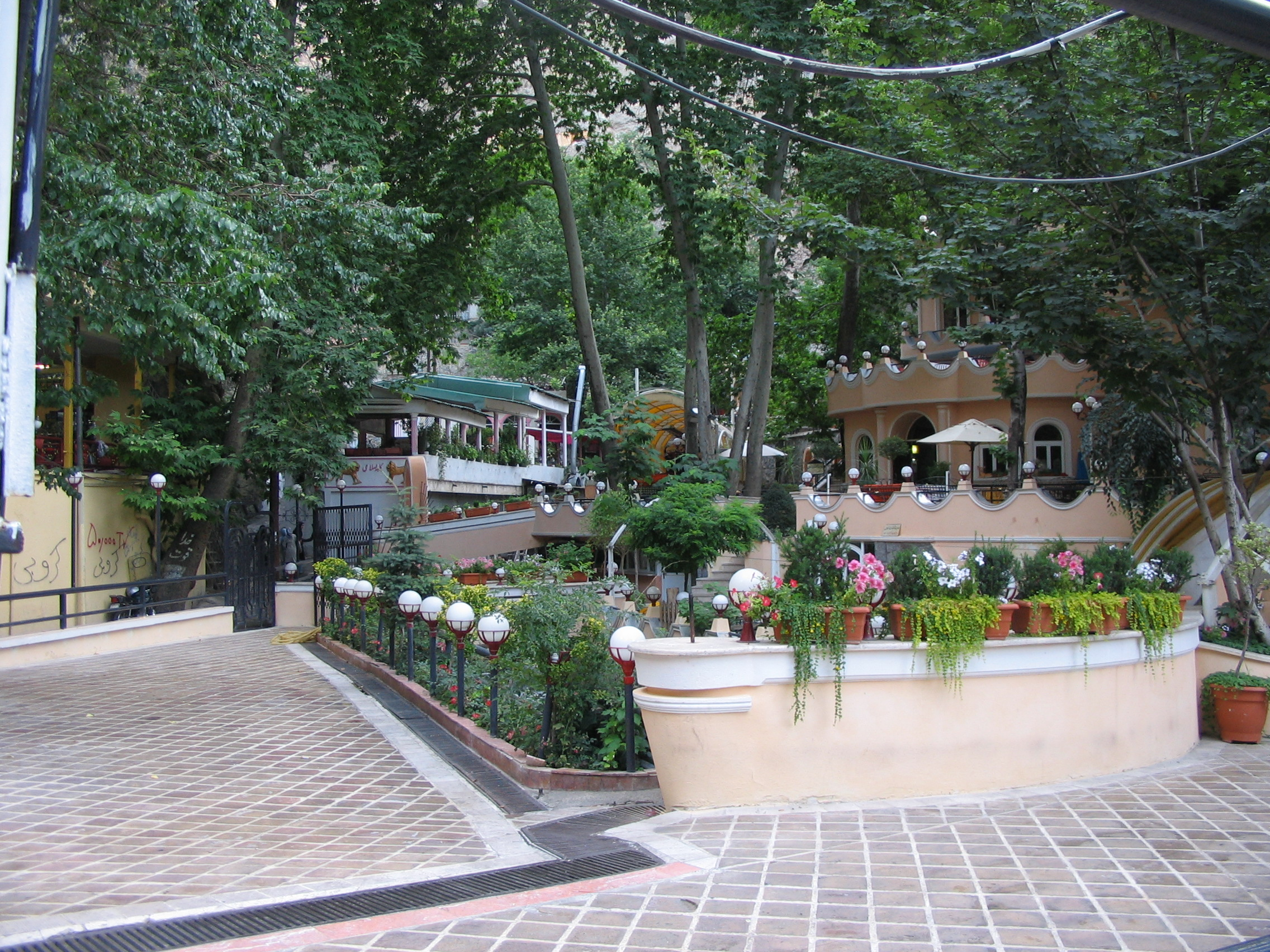
A restaurant in Darband
