= Tajrish =

Neighborhood and city in Tehran province, Iran

Tajrish Persian: تجريش
- City
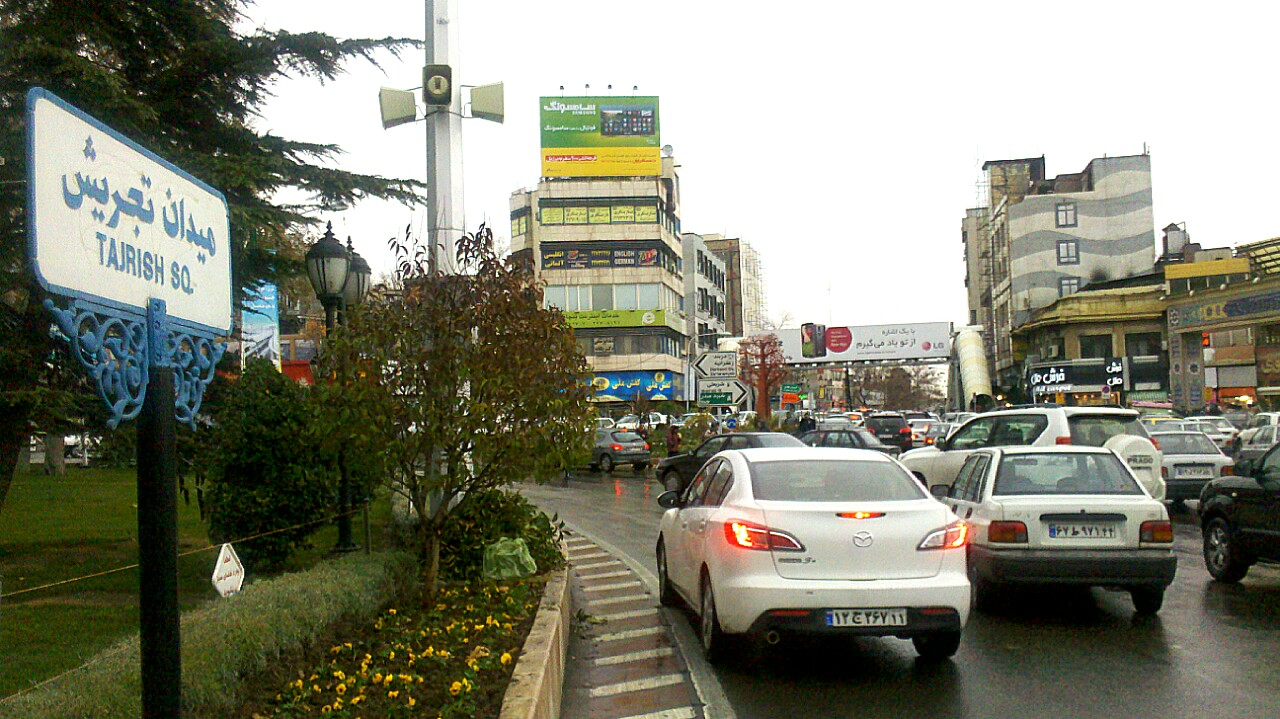
- Tajrish Square

- Location within Iran
- Coordinates: 35°48′20″N 51°26′17″E
- Country: Iran
- Province: Tehran
- County: Shemiranat
- District: Lavasanat

Population (2006)
  - Total: 86,000
- Time zone: UTC+3:30 (IRST)

Tajrish (Persian: تجريش, pronounced [tædʒˈɾiːʃ]) (Note: Also Romanized as Tajrīš) refers both to a neighbourhood of Tehran, capital of Iran, and to a broader administrative city historically known as Shemiran. The city of Tajrish is synonymous with District 1 of Tehran along with adjacent parts of District 2 (such as Evin and Darakeh), and serves as the capital of Shemiranat County, Tehran province. At one time a village, it was later absorbed into the city of Tehran.

The Tajrish neighbourhood is located along the northern edge of Tehran. During the last few decades, it has become popular with the wealthy by virtue of its low levels of pollution. As of 2006, the neighborhood had 86,000 inhabitants. W Tajrish Square itself is known as Sar-e Pol-e Tajrish (سر پل تجریش), "at the Tajrish Bridge". This square is actually a vast bridge on top of a qanat river. In older times the locals used to call this bridge Gowgal, meaning "(The Bridge) of the Cowherd".

== History ==
The location of the neighbourhood was once an ancient village, and in 1788, the Qajar dynasty chose this as their capital. It is known for its mountainous landscape. The area was often used as a summer retreat by city residents.

Until the 1920s, Tajrish and neighbouring Shemiranat were a collection of small villages along Tehran's city border. The area was relatively disconnected from Tehran's urban area with the exception of Old Shemiran Road, currently known as Shariati Avenue. During the Pahlavi era, with the construction of Pahlavi Street (now named Valiasr Street) in the 1930s and Modarres Highway, then known as Shahanshahi Boulevard, the Northern suburbs became accessible from downtown and extension became possible.

== Demographics ==
=== Population ===
The population of the city of Tajrish in 1335 was 26,525 and in the census of 1365 was about 40,000. In the 1996 census, due to Tajrish being connected to the city of Tehran and being located in the Greater Tehran area, its population was mentioned along with the population of Tehran.

=== Dialect ===
Tajrishi is also a dialect of Persian, which is nowadays almost extinct and has been replaced by standard Persian. The etymology of the word Tajrish itself is unknown.

Iranian linguist Habib Borjian, after examining all the available material concerning this dialect opines that it is a dialect of the Persian and writes: "Tajrishi shows no divergence from the Persid group, despite minor variation with respect to modern standard Persian. It is in verb morphology that we do find in Tajrishi a massive Caspian overlay, imposed on the dialect by means of age-old socio-economic ties with the districts to its north in the Alborz chain. We may thus characterize Tajrishi and other Shemirāni dialects as Persian with a significant Caspian imprint. Surprisingly enough, we find no trace of a Northwestern Iranian substratum in the dialect of Tajrish, nor do we find it in the scanty material available to us about the other extinct vernaculars of Shemirān ... This situation can only attest to an early Persianization of Rey and its adjoining settlements."

== Geography ==
Tajrish is located at the foot of the Alborz mountain range and Tajrish Square is located at an altitude of 1600 meters above sea level. Tajrish's climate is temperate and cold. The maximum temperature in summer is 36 degrees and the minimum in winter is -20 degrees. There have been aqueducts in Tajrish and some of them still flow. Among them are Imamzadeh Saleh aqueduct, Mohammadieh aqueduct, Maghsoudbak aqueduct along Darband river, Sarpol Tajrish aqueduct and Kahrizak aqueduct which was manifested in the lower support of Tajrish.

== Overview ==
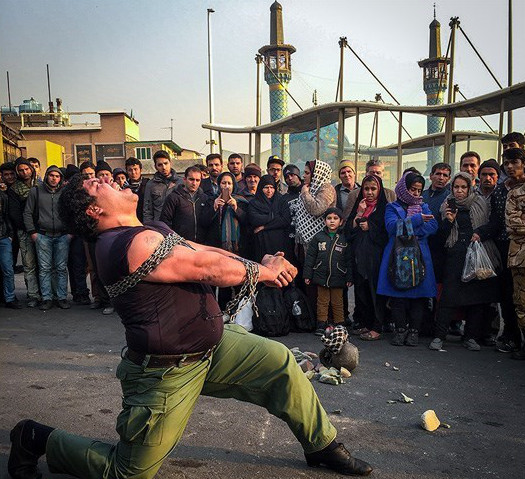
Ma'rekeh-giri performer in Tajrish Square (2014)

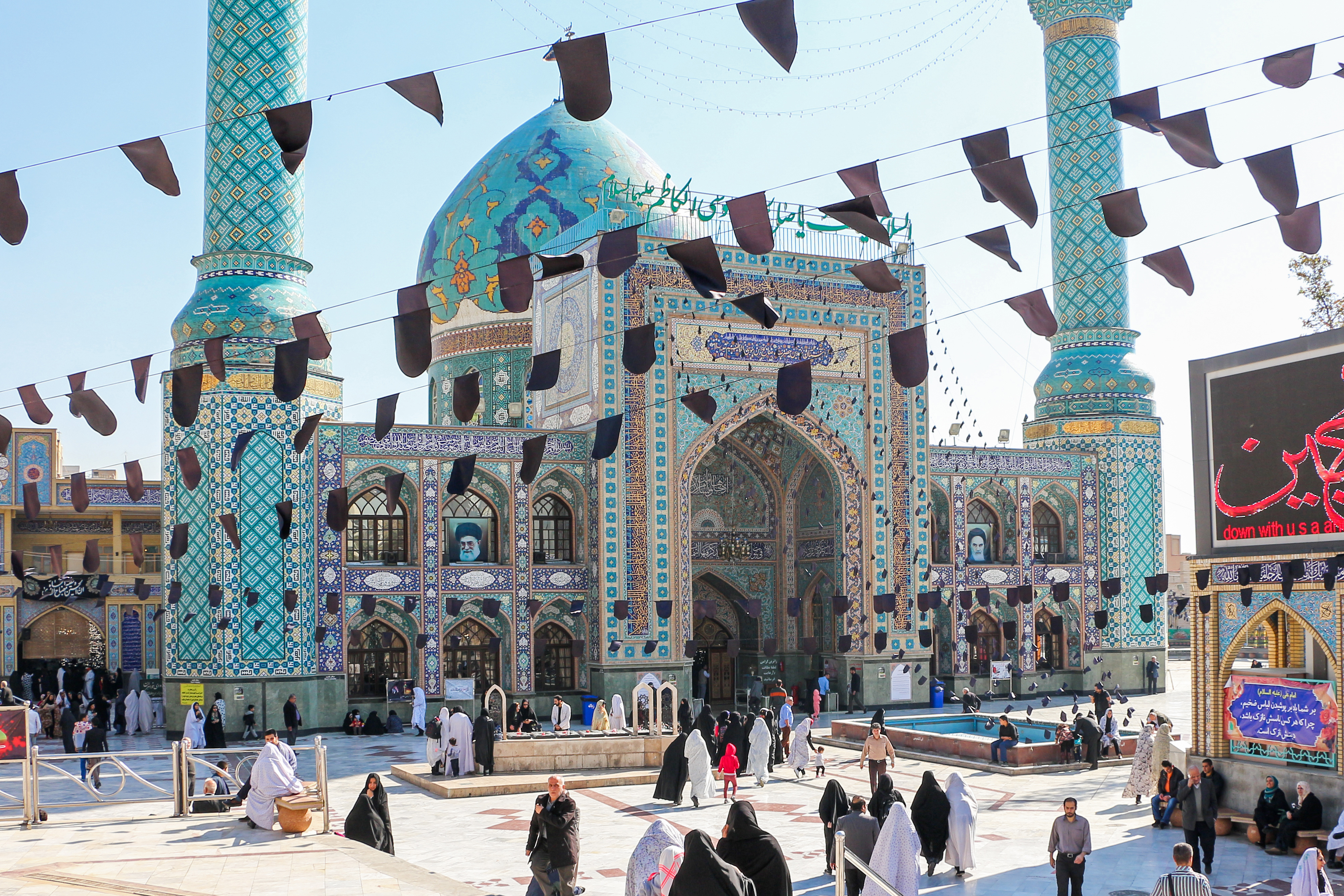
Imamzadeh Saleh (2016)

Tajrish Square is one of the busiest parts of Tehran, with bus terminals, cab terminals. It is the location of shopping malls and of street performers, and where people gather to celebrate holidays.

Tourist spots in Tajrish are the bazaar and a mausoleum called Imamzadeh Saleh. A number of Shia Islam religious sites are located here, including the mausoleum, a shrine called Imamzadeh Qassem, and a few Takyehs or religious buildings (such as Takyeh Borzog, Takyeh Pa'in, Tajrish Tekyeh).

The square is where Valiasr Street terminates. Valiasr is the longest street in Tehran. It is also one of the busiest transportation hubs in Tehran. Many suburbs are accessible from this square. Tajrish is at the junction of streets that lead to Sa'dabad Palace, Velenjak, Asad Abad, Zafaraniyeh, Elahieh, and Niavaran as well as many of the other places in northern Tehran. A metro station, the northern terminus of line one (the red line) is located here.

=== Tajrish Bazaar ===
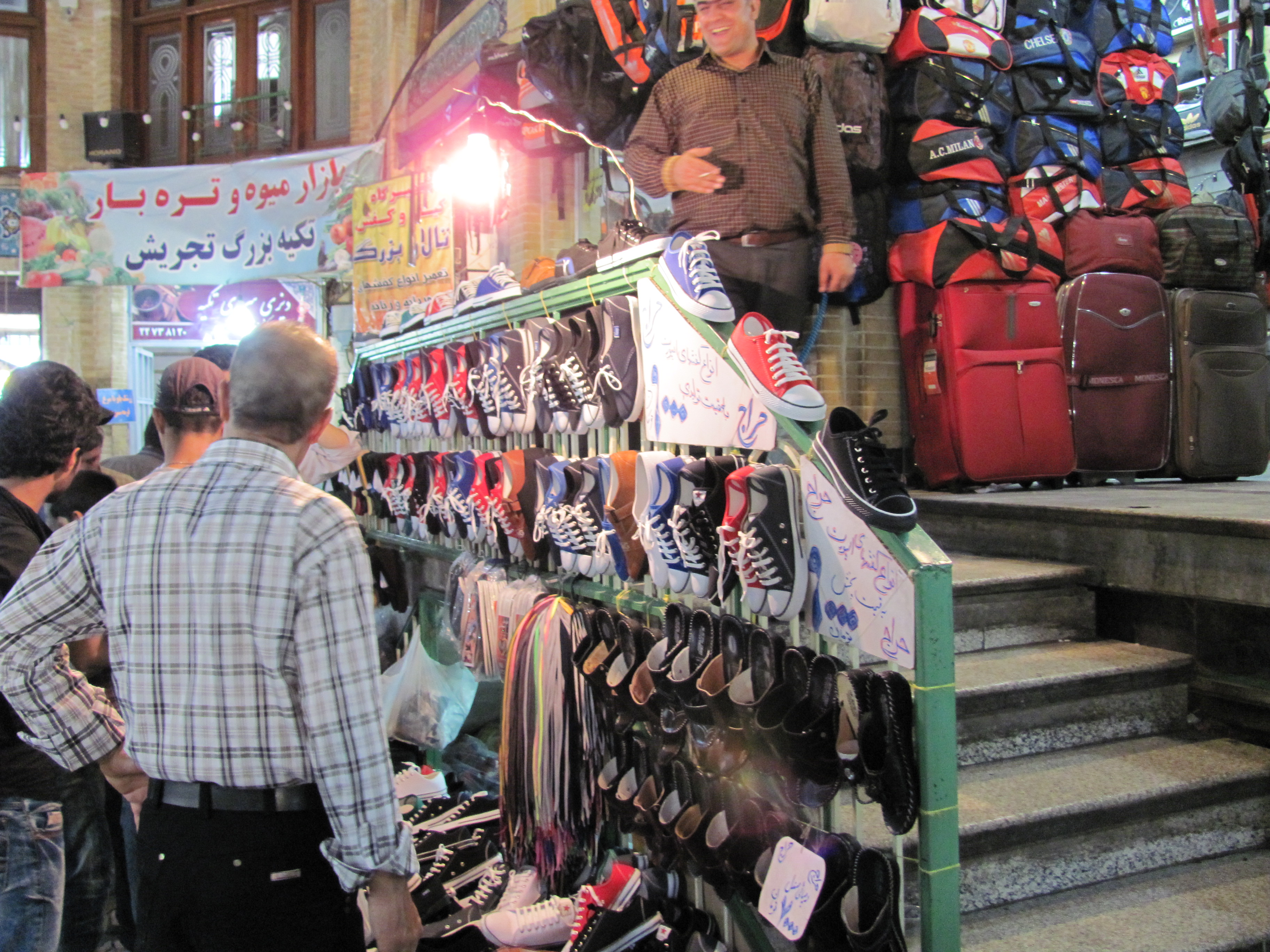
Tajrish Bazaar (2018)

Tehran has two bazaars, the Tajrish Bazaar is located in the north and the Grand Bazaar is located in the south of the city. The bazaar was developed in the 18th-century (although some sources state early 19th-century), and was associated with the village of Shemiranat and the Qajar dynasty. The location of the Tajrish Bazaar is bound by Panzandeh-e Kordad Street, Molavi Street, Mostafa Khomeini Street, and Khayyam Street.

Tajrish Bazaar has been built according to architectural style which resembles the Grand Bazaar in downtown Tehran. Some of its arches have been destroyed due to construction of multi-story buildings and its traditional identity has been threatened by irregularity of window shops and external view of new stores. Tajrish Bazaar includes a roofed passageway through which people pass en route to either paying pilgrimage the Emamzadeh Saleh or to the bazaar for purchasing goods.

== Gallery ==
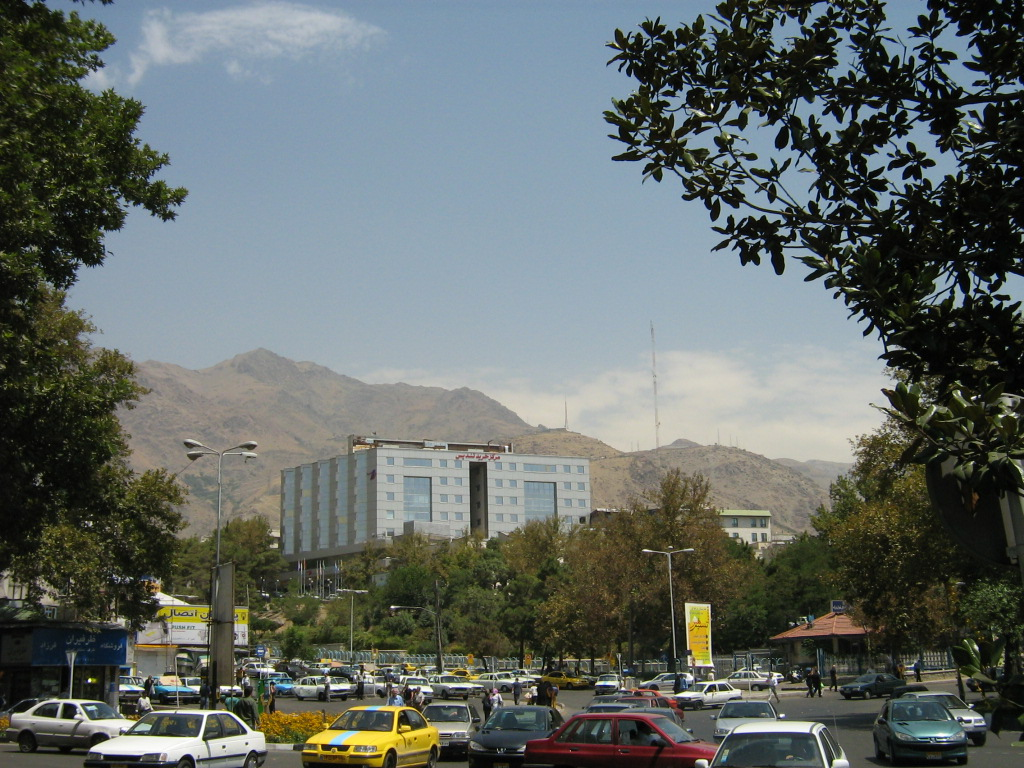
Tandiss Mall and Shopping Center

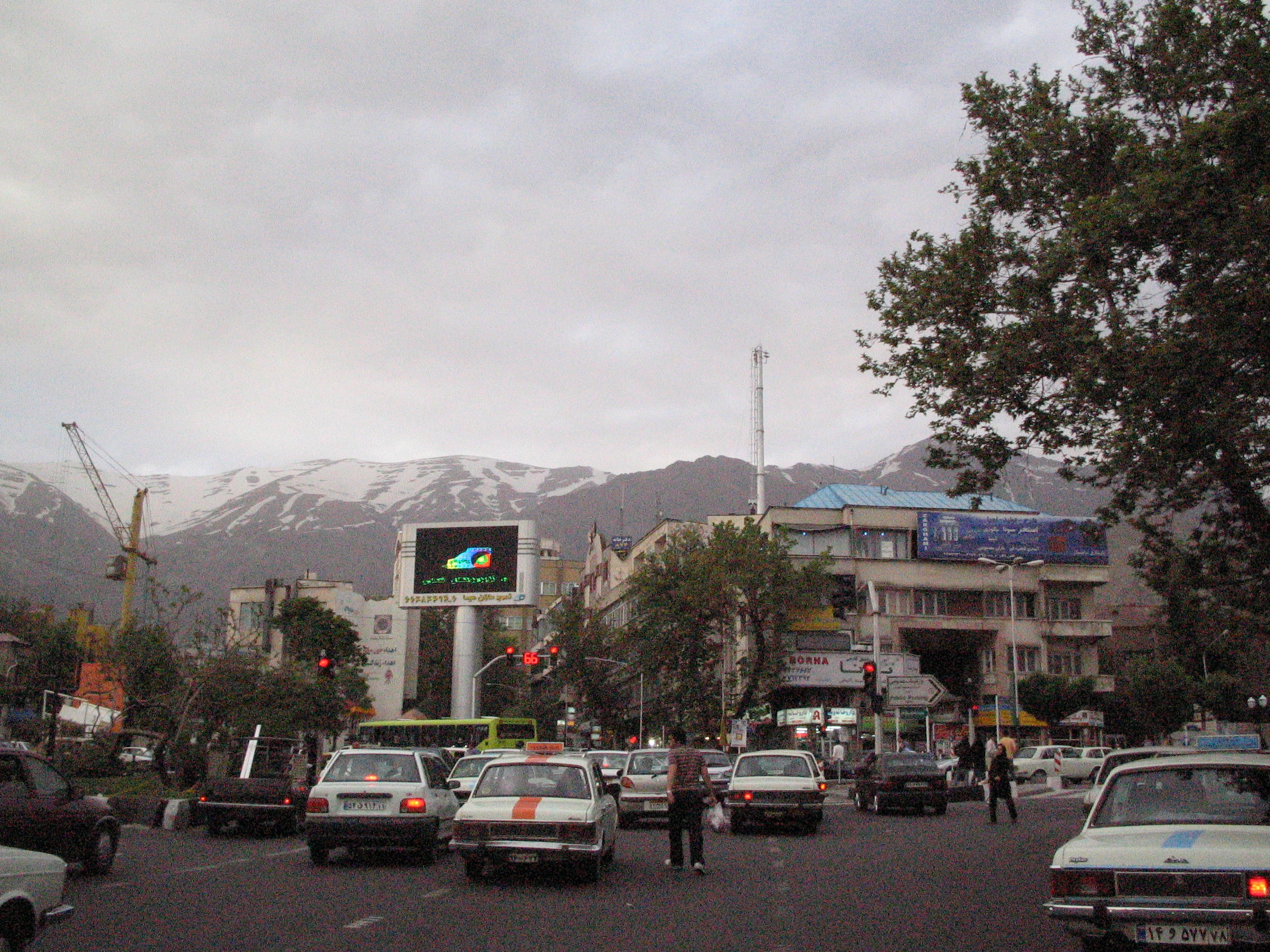
A view of Tajrish Square looking northwards

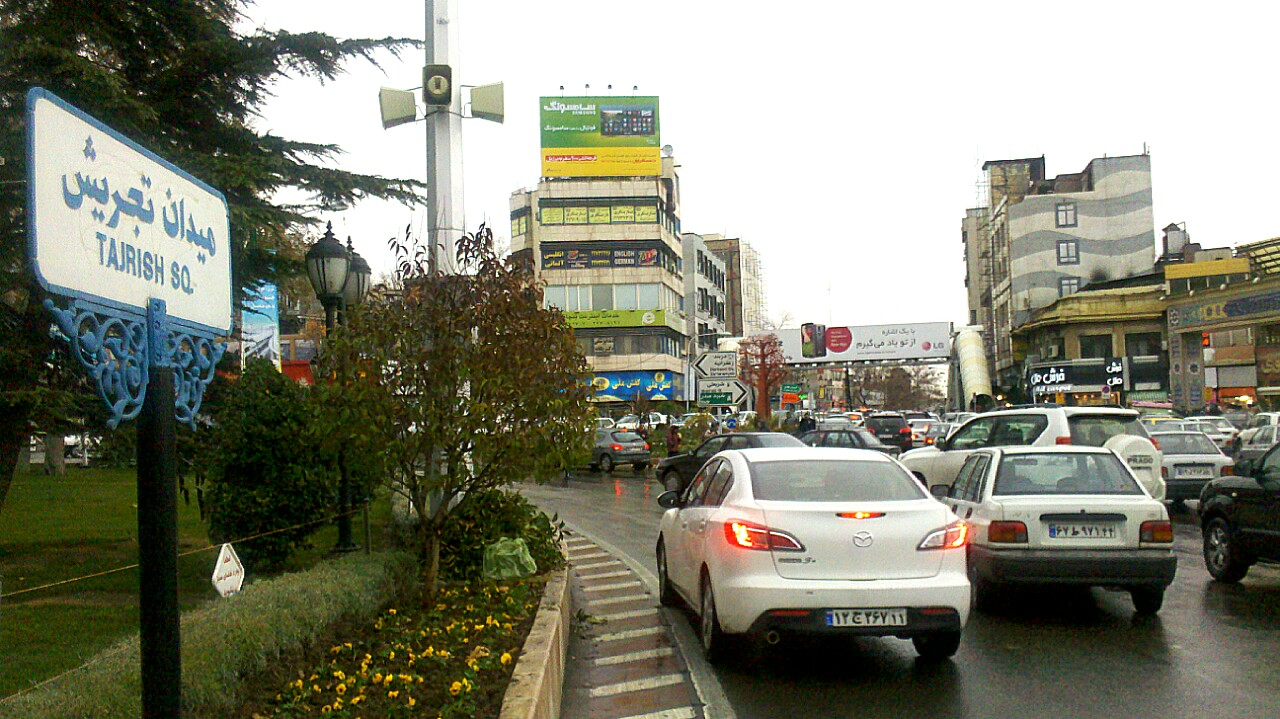
Tajrish Square in spring

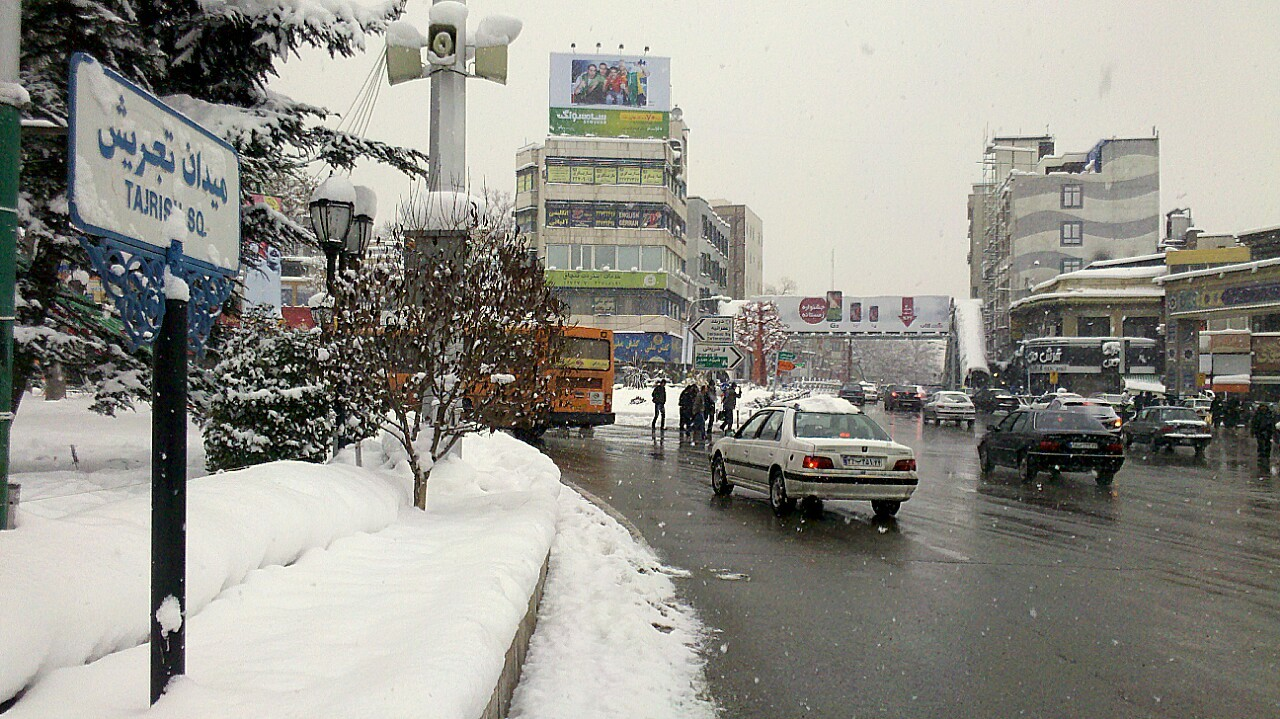
Tajrish Square in winter

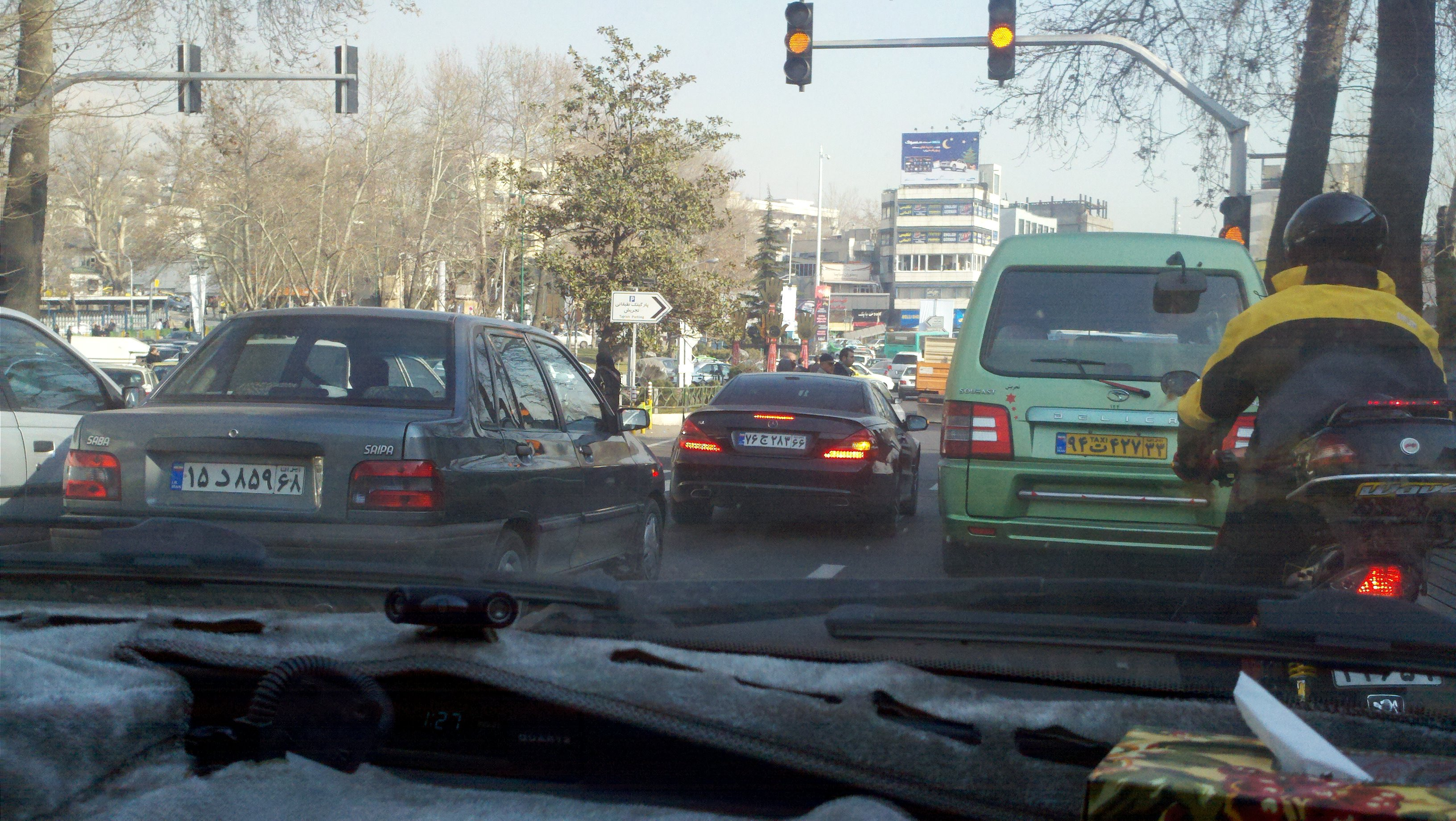
Valiasr Street before Tajrish Square

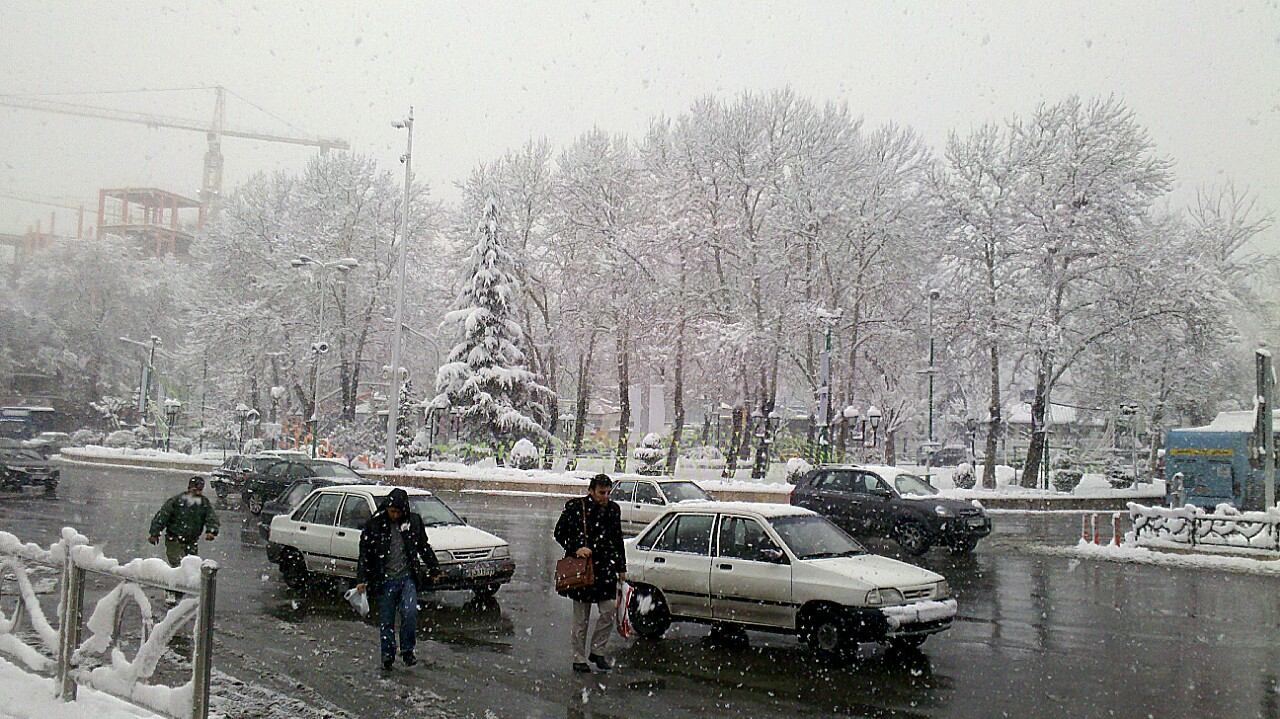
Tajrish Square in winter

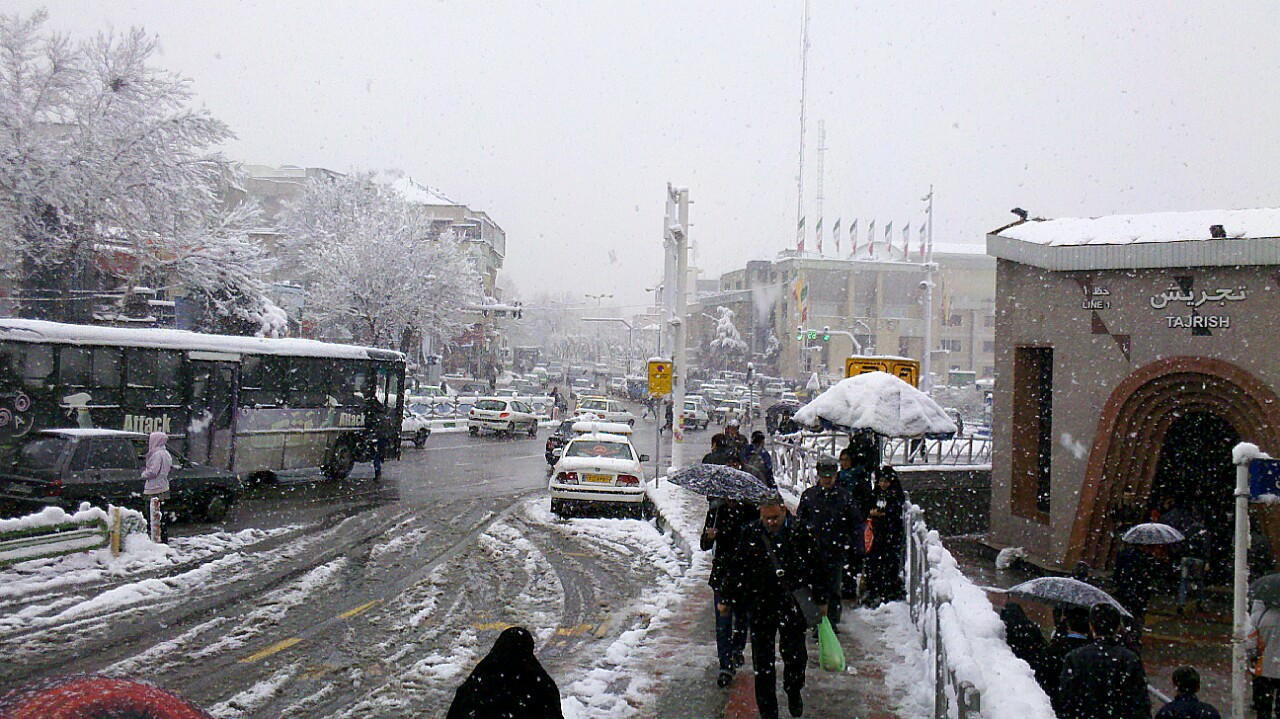
Tajrish neighbourhood in winter

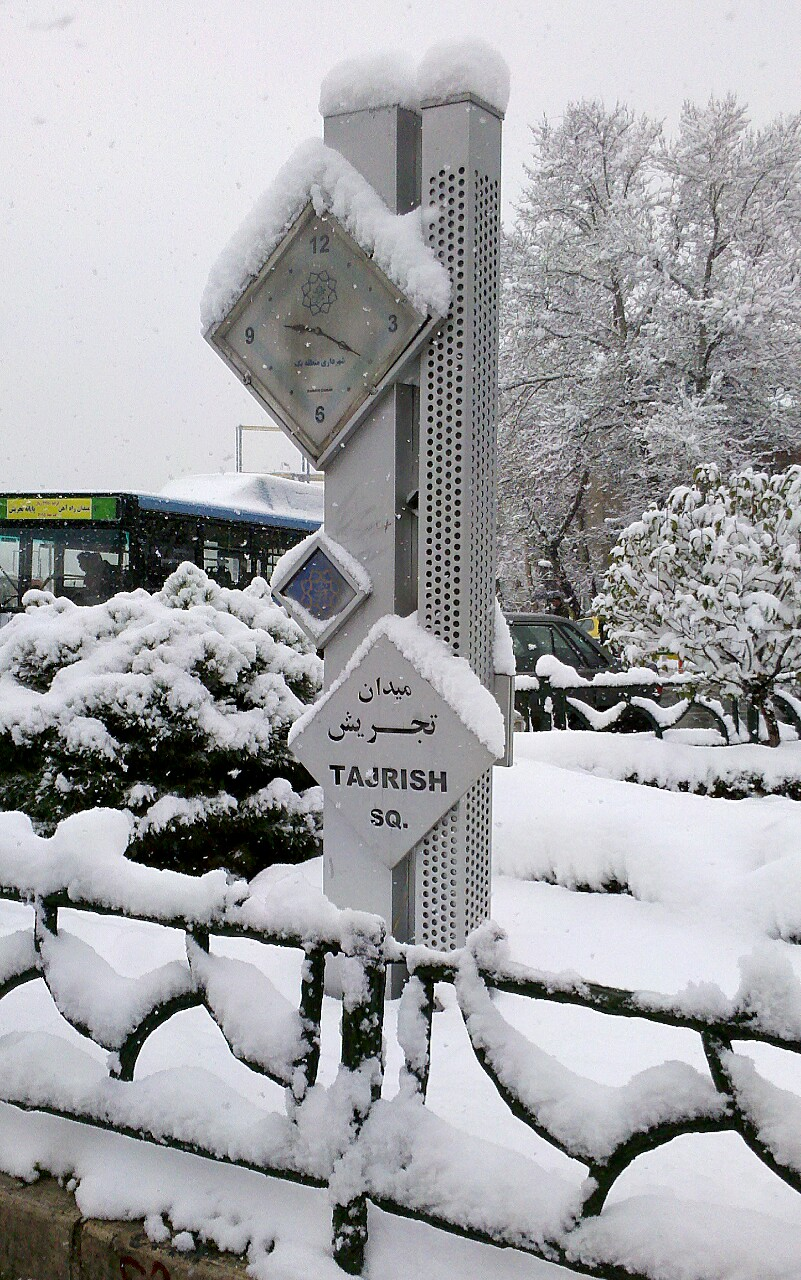
Tajrish Square in winter

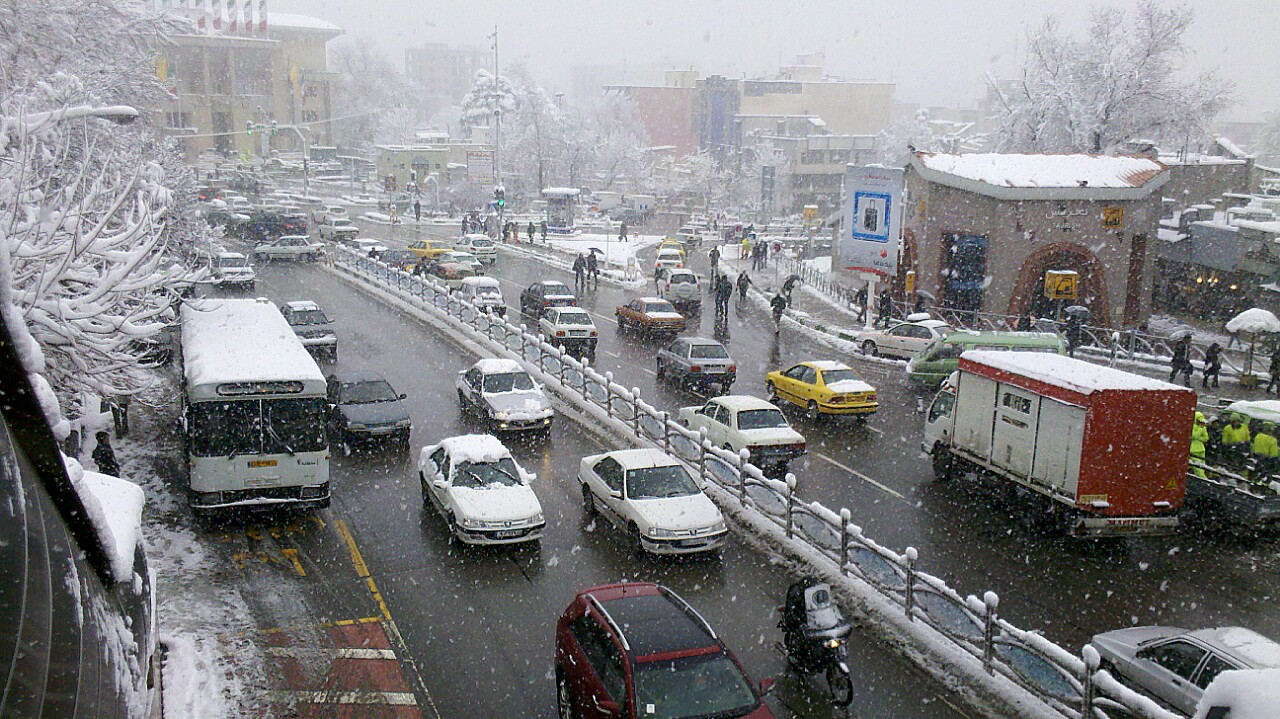
Shahrdari Street

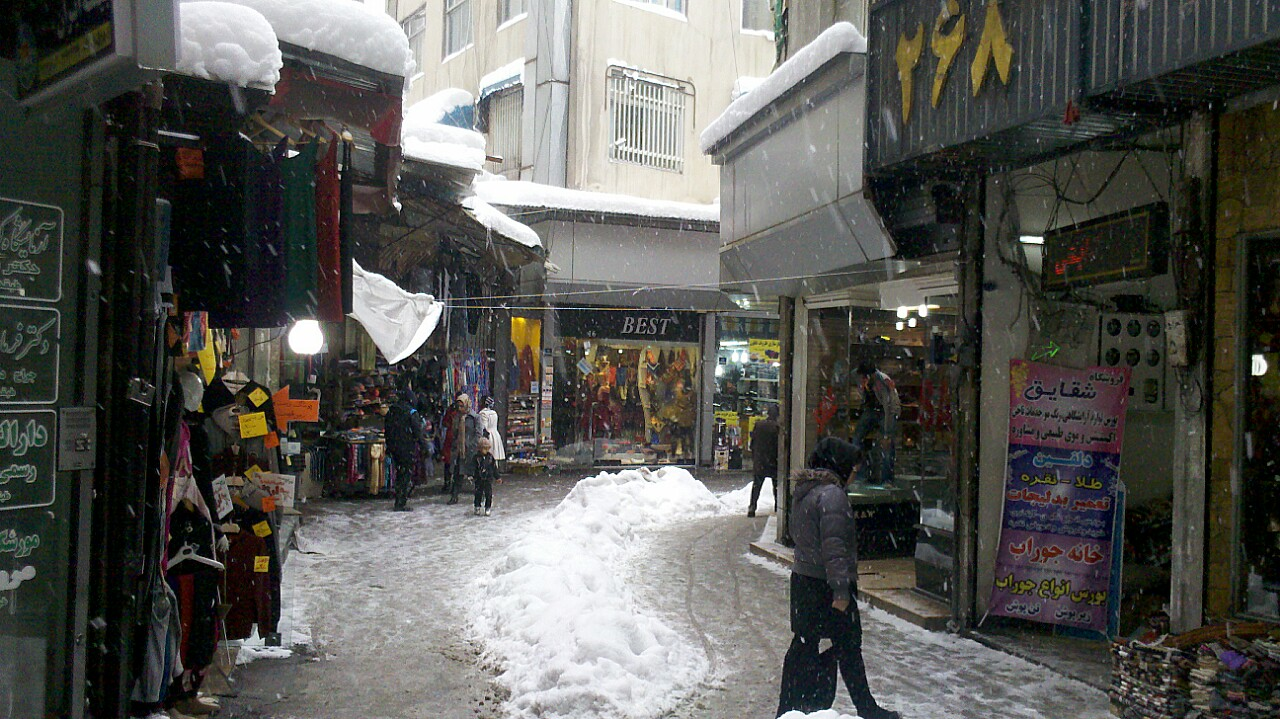
Ghaem Shopping Centre

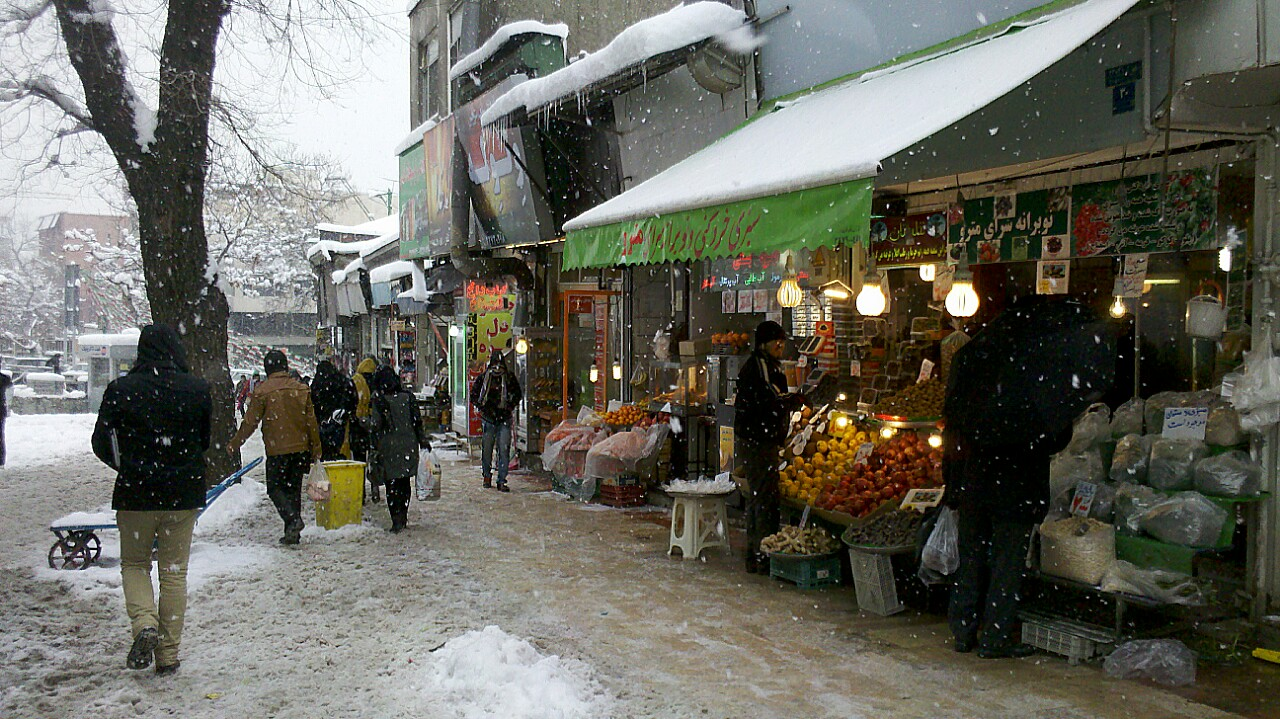
Inside the old markets of Tajrish

== See also ==
Media related to Tajrish at Wikimedia Commons
