= List of cities of Iran by population =

The most populated cities of Iran in 2010.

Iran has one of the highest urban population growth rates in the world. From 1950 to 2002, the urban proportion of the population increased from 27% to 60%. The United Nations predicts that by 2030 80% of the population will live in urban areas. Most internal migrants have settled near the cities of Tehran, Isfahan, Karaj, Ahvaz, Mashhad and Qom.

Tehran, with a population of 8.7 million in 2016, is the largest city in Iran and is the nation's capital. Tehran is home to around 11% of Iran's population. It is the hub of Iran's communication and transport networks.

Mashhad, with a population of 4.2 million in 2019, is the second-largest Iranian city and the centre of the province of Razavi Khorasan. Mashhad is one of the holiest Shi'a cities in the world as it is the site of the Imam Reza shrine. It is the centre of tourism in Iran. Between 15 and 20 million pilgrims go to Imam Reza's shrine every year.

The third most populous city of Iran is Isfahan with a population 2.5 million in 2019. This city is one of the most industrial cities of Iran, hosting large industries and a number of UNESCO World Heritage Sites. The city has a wide variety of historic monuments and is known for its paintings, history and architecture.

The fourth most populous Iranian city is Karaj, with a population of 2.1 million in 2019. Karaj is the capital of Alborz province and is 35 km west of Tehran, at the foot of Alborz mountains. Karaj is increasingly becoming an extension of metropolitan Tehran.

The fifth most populous Iranian city is Shiraz (population 1.57 million), which is located in the southwest of Iran with a moderate climate and has been a regional trade center for over a thousand years. Shiraz is one of the oldest cities of ancient Persia, known as the city of poets, literature and flowers. It is also considered by many Iranians to be the city of gardens and also a major center for Iran's electronic industries.

Other major cities include Tabriz (population 1.56 million), Qom (population 1.2 million) and Ahvaz (population 1.18 million).

== City nicknames ==
City	Nickname
Isfahan	Half of the World
Tehran	City of 72 Nations
Zahedan	Little London
Yasuj	City of Tulips
Mashhad	Spiritual Capital of Iran
Piranshahr	Tourism Gateway of Iran
Urmia	Little Paris
Ahvaz	City of Bridges
Shahrekord	Roof of Iran
Abadan	Brazil of Iran
Ardabil	City of Honey
Ramsar	Bride of Iran

== List of Metro Cities ==
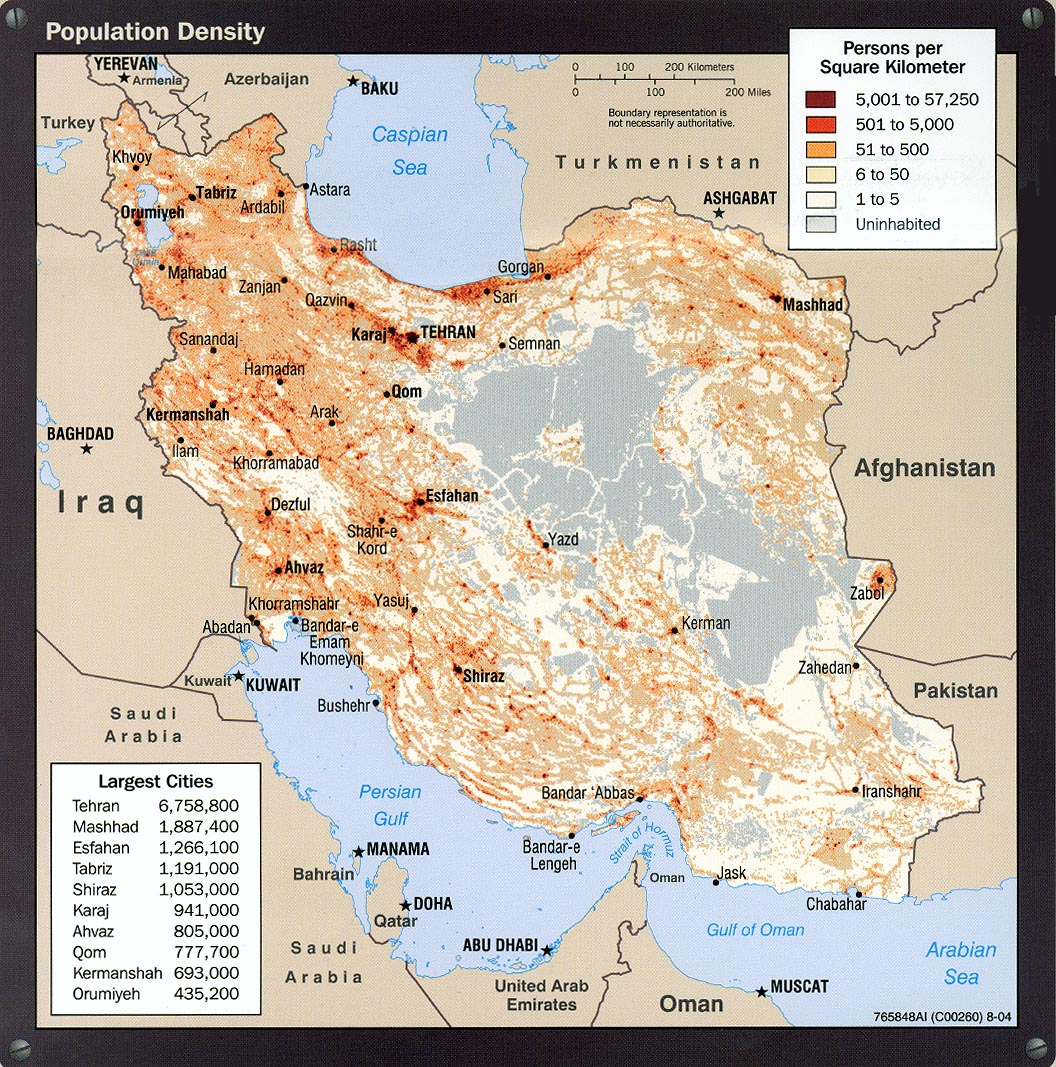
A 1996 map of Iran's population density

There are ten cities or metropolitan areas in Iran with a million or more inhabitants, according to the 2016 census.

Rank	City	Population
1	Tehran	15,800,000
2	Isfahan	3,989,070
3	Mashhad	3,416,000
4	Karaj	2,512,737
5	Shiraz	2,080,000
6	Tabriz	1,773,023
7	Qom	1,260,000
8	Ahvaz	1,184,788
9	Kermanshah	1,083,833
10	Urmia	1,000,000

== Cities over 100,000 population ==
The following sorted table, lists the most populous cities in Iran with a population of more than 100,000 in 2016. A city is displayed in bold if it is the province capital.

Rank	City	Province	Date of Official Foundation of Municipality	2016 Census	2011 Census	Change
1	**Tehran**	Tehran	1907	8,693,706	8,154,051	+6.62%
2	**Mashhad**	Razavi Khorasan	1918	3,001,184	2,749,374	+9.16%
3	**Isfahan**	Isfahan	1907	1,961,260	1,756,126	+11.68%
4	**Karaj**	Alborz	1951	1,592,492	1,614,626	−1.37%
5	**Shiraz**	Fars	1907	1,565,572	1,460,665	+7.18%
6	**Tabriz**	East Azerbaijan	1907	1,558,693	1,494,988	+4.26%
7	**Qom**	Qom	1926	1,201,158	1,074,036	+11.84%
8	**Ahvaz**	Khuzestan	1925	1,184,788	1,112,021	+6.54%
9	**Kermanshah**	Kermanshah	1912	946,651	851,405	+11.19%
10	**Urmia**	West Azerbaijan	1928	736,224	667,499	+10.30%
11	**Rasht**	Gilan	1907	679,995	639,951	+6.26%
12	**Zahedan**	Sistan and Baluchestan	1938	587,730	560,725	+4.82%
13	**Hamadan**	Hamadan	1911	554,406	525,794	+5.44%
14	**Kerman**	Kerman	1907	537,718	534,441	+0.61%
15	**Yazd**	Yazd	1926	529,673	486,152	+8.95%
16	**Ardabil**	Ardabil	1925	529,374	482,632	+9.68%
17	**Bandar Abbas**	Hormozgan	1925	526,648	435,751	+20.86%
18	**Arak**	Markazi	1927	520,944	526,182	−1.00%
19	Eslamshahr	Tehran	1978	448,129	389,102	+15.17%
20	**Zanjan**	Zanjan	1923	430,871	386,851	+11.38%
21	**Sanandaj**	Kurdistan	1928	412,767	373,987	+10.37%
22	**Qazvin**	Qazvin	1924	402,748	381,598	+5.54%
23	**Khorramabad**	Lorestan	1931	373,416	348,216	+7.24%
24	**Gorgan**	Golestan	1925	350,676	329,536	+6.42%
25	**Sari**	Mazandaran	1927	347,402	296,417	+17.20%
26	Shahriar	Tehran	1952	309,607	249,473	+24.10%
27	Qods	Tehran	1989	309,605	283,517	+9.20%
28	Kashan	Isfahan	1930	304,487	275,325	+10.59%
29	Malard	Tehran	1995	281,027	290,817	−3.37%
30	Dezful	Khuzestan	1920	264,709	248,380	+6.57%
31	Nishapur	Razavi Khorasan	1931	264,375	239,185	+10.53%
32	Babol	Mazandaran	1925	250,217	219,467	+14.01%
33	Khomeyni Shahr	Isfahan	1932	247,128	244,696	+0.99%
34	Sabzevar	Razavi Khorasan	1930	243,700	231,557	+5.24%
35	Piranshahr	West Azerbaijan	1996	239,556	259,480	−7.68%
36	Amol	Mazandaran	1933	237,528	219,915	+8.01%
37	Pakdasht	Tehran	1991	236,319	206,490	+14.45%
38	Najafabad	Isfahan	1931	235,281	221,814	+6.07%
39	Borujerd	Lorestan	1935	234,997	240,654	−2.35%
40	Abadan	Khuzestan	1924	231,476	212,744	+8.80%
41	Qarchak	Tehran	1976	231,075	191,588	+20.61%
42	**Bojnord**	North Khorasan	1931	228,931	199,791	+14.59%
43	Varamin	Tehran	1941	225,628	218,991	+3.03%
44	**Bushehr**	Bushehr	1922	223,504	195,222	+14.49%
45	Saveh	Markazi	1931	220,762	200,481	+10.12%
46	Qaem Shahr	Mazandaran	1935	204,953	196,050	+4.54%
47	**Birjand**	South Khorasan	1928	203,636	178,020	+14.39%
48	Nasimshahr	Tehran	1995	200,393	157,474	+27.25%
49	Sirjan	Kerman	1936	199,704	185,623	+7.59%
50	Khoy	West Azerbaijan	1923	198,845	200,958	−1.05%
51	**Ilam**	Ilam	1936	194,030	172,213	+12.67%
52	Bukan	West Azerbaijan	1948	193,501	170,600	+13.42%
53	**Shahr-e Kord**	Chaharmahal and Bakhtiari	1931	190,441	159,775	+19.19%
54	**Semnan**	Semnan	1925	185,129	153,680	+20.46%
55	Fardis	Alborz	2013	181,174	181,174	0.00%
56	Maragheh	East Azerbaijan	1921	175,255	162,275	+8.00%
57	Shahin Shahr	Isfahan	1976	173,329	143,308	+20.95%
58	Malayer	Hamadan	1934	170,237	159,848	+6.50%
59	Mahabad	West Azerbaijan	1931	168,393	147,268	+14.34%
60	Saqqez	Kurdistan	1935	165,258	139,738	+18.26%
61	Bandar-e Mahshahr	Khuzestan	1954	162,797	153,778	+5.86%
62	Rafsanjan	Kerman	1935	161,909	151,420	+6.93%
63	Gonbad-e Kavus	Golestan	1934	151,910	144,546	+5.09%
64	Shahrud	Semnan	1925	150,129	140,474	+6.87%
65	Marvdasht	Fars	1950	148,858	138,649	+7.36%
66	Kamal Shahr	Alborz	1996	141,669	109,943	+28.86%
67	Jahrom	Fars	1925	141,634	114,108	+24.12%
68	Torbat-e Heydarieh	Razavi Khorasan	1928	140,019	131,150	+6.76%
69	Marivan	Kurdistan	1957	136,654	110,464	+23.71%
70	Andimeshk	Khuzestan	1956	135,116	126,811	+6.55%
71	Shahreza	Isfahan	1929	134,952	123,767	+9.04%
72	Zabol	Sistan and Baluchestan	1928	134,950	137,722	−2.01%
73	**Yasuj**	Kohgiluyeh and Boyer-Ahmad	1970	134,532	108,505	+23.99%
74	Miandoab	West Azerbaijan	1935	134,425	123,081	+9.22%
75	Khorramshahr	Khuzestan	1925	133,097	129,418	+2.84%
76	Marand	East Azerbaijan	1929	130,825	124,323	+5.23%
77	Jiroft	Kerman	1946	130,429	111,034	+17.47%
78	Bam	Kerman	1937	127,396	107,131	+18.92%
79	Behbahan	Khuzestan	1937	122,604	107,412	+14.14%
80	Dorud	Lorestan	1949	121,638	99,499	+22.25%
81	Nazarabad	Alborz	2002	119,512	107,806	+10.86%
82	Mohammadshahr	Alborz	1996	119,418	100,519	+18.80%
83	Izeh	Khuzestan	1958	119,399	117,093	+1.97%
84	Bandar-e Anzali	Gilan	1922	118,564	116,664	+1.63%
85	Andisheh	Tehran	2003	116,062	96,807	+19.89%
86	Iranshahr	Sistan and Baluchestan	1940	113,750	97,012	+17.25%
87	Fasa	Fars	1926	110,825	104,809	+5.74%
88	Borazjan	Bushehr	1928	110,567	95,449	+15.84%
89	Baneh	Kurdistan	1948	110,218	85,190	+29.38%
90	Chabahar	Sistan and Baluchestan	1950	106,739	85,633	+24.65%
91	Robat Karim	Tehran	1983	105,393	78,097	+34.95%
92	Kashmar	Razavi Khorasan	1929	102,282	90,200	+13.39%
93	Shushtar	Khuzestan	1927	101,878	106,815	−4.62%
94	Quchan	Razavi Khorasan	1937	101,604	103,760	−2.08%
95	Lahijan	Gilan	1928	101,073	94,051	+7.47%
96	Ahar	East Azerbaijan	1944	100,641	92,608	+8.67%
97	Masjed Soleyman	Khuzestan	1959	100,497	103,369	−2.78%
98	Torbat-e Jam	Razavi Khorasan	1933	100,449	94,758	+6.01%

== Cities by province ==
This is a list of cities in Iran, categorized by province. The census years listed below comes from the Statistical Center of Iran. Since 2006, Iran has conducted a census every five years. Cities in bold indicate provincial, county, or district capitals. Iran is divided into 31 provinces and includes a total of 1,245 cities.

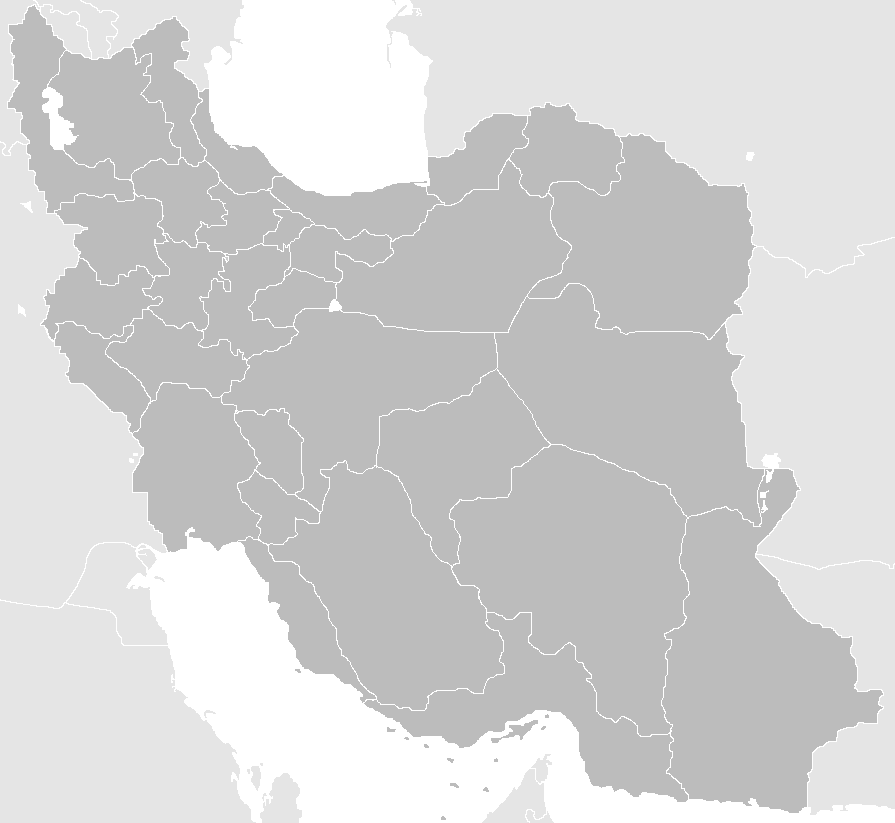
Population maps of Iranian counties and provinces

Largest cities in Iran; Tehran, Isfahan, and Mashhad

Provinces of Iran

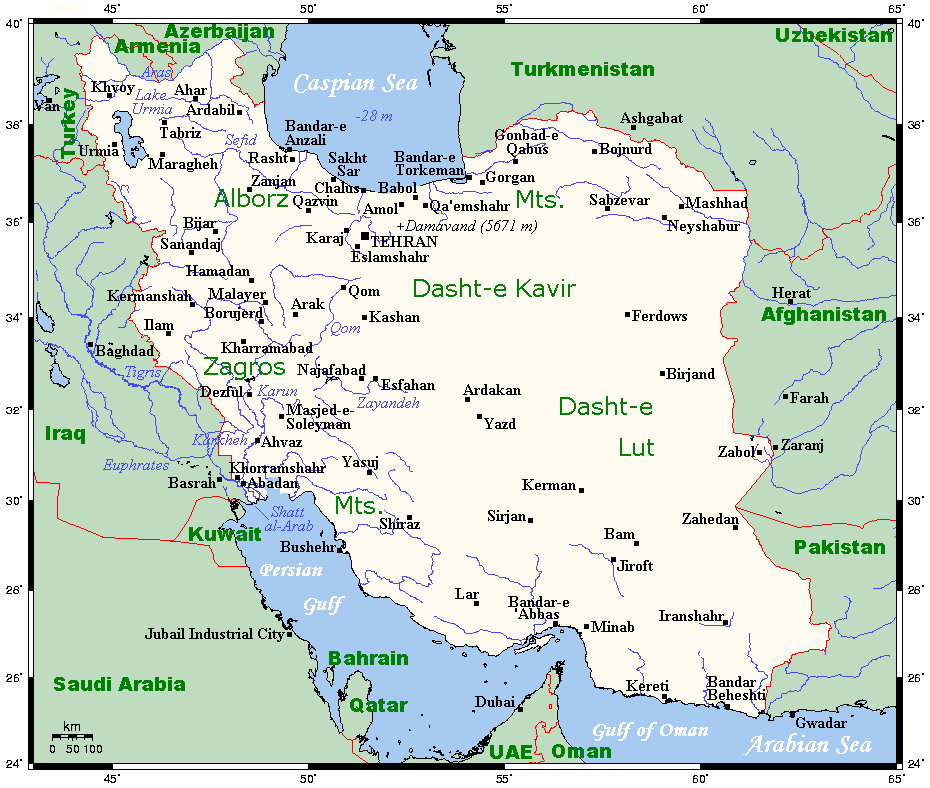

=== Alborz province ===
Counties of Alborz

Rank	City	2016 Census	2011 Census	Change
1	**Karaj**	1,592,492	1,614,626	−1.37%
2	Fardis	181,174	181,174	0.00%
3	Kamal Shahr	141,669	109,943	+28.86%
4	**Nazarabad**	119,512	107,806	+10.86%
5	Mohammadshahr	119,418	100,519	+18.80%
6	Mahdasht	62,910	51,518	+22.11%
7	**Meshkin Dasht**	62,005	53,440	+16.03%
8	**Hashtgerd**	55,640	51,953	+7.10%
9	**Chaharbagh**	48,828	6,772	+621.03%
10	Shahr-e Jadid-e Hashtgerd	42,147	22,742	+85.33%
11	**Eshtehard**	29,993	23,010	+30.35%
12	Garmdarreh	22,726	13,248	+71.54%
13	Golsar	13,745	12,407	+10.78%
14	**Kuhsar**	10,940	8,303	+31.76%
15	**Tankaman**	4,654	4,190	+11.07%
16	**Taleqan**	3,545	3,211	+10.40%
17	**Asara**	1,339	701	+91.01%

=== Ardabil province ===
Counties of Ardabil Province

Rank	City	2016 Census	2011 Census	Change
1	**Ardabil**	529,374	482,632	+9.68%
2	**Parsabad**	93,387	88,924	+5.02%
3	**Meshginshahr**	74,109	66,883	+10.80%
4	**Khalkhal**	39,304	41,165	−4.52%
5	**Germi**	28,967	28,953	+0.05%
6	**Bileh Savar**	16,188	15,183	+6.62%
7	**Namin**	13,659	11,963	+14.18%
8	**Jafarabad**	7,226	7,706	−6.23%
9	**Kivi**	7,101	7,158	−0.80%
10	**Abi Beyglu**	6,516	5,999	+8.62%
11	**Aslan Duz**	6,348	4,557	+39.30%
12	**Nir**	5,873	5,820	+0.91%
13	**Anbaran**	5,757	6,084	−5.37%
14	**Hashatjin**	5,725	4,578	+25.05%
15	**Sareyn**	5,459	4,440	+22.95%
16	**Eslamabad-e Qadim**	3,068	3,068	0.00%
17	**Tazeh Kand-e Angut**	2,645	2,544	+3.97%
18	**Tazeh Kand-e Qadim**	2,575	2,798	−7.97%
19	**Kolowr**	2,347	2,105	+11.50%
20	**Lahrud**	2,149	2,583	−16.80%
21	**Qosabeh**	2,095	2,095	0.00%
22	**Hir**	2,080	2,521	−17.49%
23	**Razey**	1,581	1,617	−2.23%
24	Fakhrabad	999	1,114	−10.32%
25	**Kuraim**	831	854	−2.69%
26	**Moradlu**	671	761	−11.83%

=== Bushehr province ===
Counties of Bushehr Province

Rank	City	2016 Census	2011 Census	Change
1	**Bushehr**	223,504	195,222	+14.49%
2	**Borazjan**	110,567	95,449	+15.84%
3	**Bandar Ganaveh**	73,472	64,110	+14.60%
4	**Bandar Kangan**	60,187	76,329	−21.15%
5	**Khormoj**	40,722	74,944	−45.66%
6	**Jam**	31,436	16,313	+92.71%
7	**Bandar Deylam**	25,730	22,393	+14.90%
8	**Bandar-e Deyr**	24,083	20,157	+19.48%
9	Ali Shahr	23,178	23,178	0.00%
10	**Ab Pakhsh**	18,913	17,238	+9.72%
11	Nakhl Taqi	18,837	11,503	+63.76%
12	**Choghadak**	18,702	18,072	+3.49%
13	**Ahram**	15,198	13,778	+10.31%
14	Bank	14,126	11,515	+22.67%
15	**Asaluyeh**	13,557	7,884	+71.96%
16	**Kaki**	12,119	10,156	+19.33%
17	Vahdatiyeh	11,222	11,414	−1.68%
18	**Sadabad**	8,248	7,859	+4.95%
19	**Kharg**	8,193	7,722	+6.10%
20	**Shabankareh**	7,900	7,653	+3.23%
21	Bardestan	7,112	6,078	+17.01%
22	**Bandar Siraf**	6,992	7,137	−2.03%
23	**Abdan**	6,827	6,211	+9.92%
24	Dalaki	6,436	6,044	+6.49%
25	**Bandar Rig**	6,252	5,619	+11.27%
26	**Bord Khun**	5,333	4,376	+21.87%
27	Dowrahak	4,852	4,852	0.00%
28	**Delvar**	4,442	3,704	+19.92%
29	Baduleh	4,028	4,028	0.00%
30	Abad	3,787	3,787	0.00%
31	Anarestan	3,400	2,735	+24.31%
32	**Riz**	3,282	2,405	+36.47%
33	**Tang-e Eram**	3,242	3,183	+1.85%
34	**Shonbeh**	2,747	2,528	+8.66%
35	**Imam Hassan**	2,731	2,498	+9.33%
36	**Kalameh**	2,463	2,164	+13.82%
37	Bushkan	2,135	2,135	0.00%

=== Chaharmahal and Bakhtiari province ===
Counties of Chaharmahal and Bakhtiari Province

Rank	City	2016 Census	2011 Census	Change
1	**Shahr-e Kord**	190,441	159,775	+19.19%
2	**Borujen**	57,071	52,694	+8.31%
3	**Lordegan**	40,528	35,276	+14.89%
4	**Farrokh Shahr**	31,739	30,036	+5.67%
5	**Farsan**	30,504	28,013	+8.89%
6	Hafshejan	21,352	20,847	+2.42%
7	**Junqan**	14,433	14,800	−2.48%
8	**Saman**	14,192	15,327	−7.41%
9	Faradonbeh	13,317	13,139	+1.35%
10	**Ben**	12,971	11,775	+10.16%
11	Kian	12,948	12,020	+7.72%
12	**Sureshjan**	12,308	11,407	+7.90%
13	**Boldaji**	11,980	11,728	+2.15%
14	**Babaheydar**	11,202	11,099	+0.93%
15	**Ardal**	10,113	8,992	+12.47%
16	Naqneh	9,923	9,603	+3.33%
17	Pardanjan	8,699	8,088	+7.55%
18	**Shalamzar**	6,899	7,132	−3.27%
19	**Gandoman**	6,291	5,761	+9.20%
20	Gahru	6,263	5,949	+5.28%
21	Gujan	6,179	6,179	0.00%
22	Taqanak	6,170	5,941	+3.85%
23	**Naghan**	6,125	4,861	+26.00%
24	**Sardasht**	5,691	5,691	0.00%
25	Sudjan	5,581	5,410	+3.16%
26	Sefiddasht	5,471	5,561	−1.62%
27	**Aluni**	5,248	4,094	+28.19%
28	Dastana	5,143	5,199	−1.08%
29	Cholicheh	4,945	4,945	0.00%
30	Vardanjan	4,456	4,324	+3.05%
31	Kaj	4,227	4,227	0.00%
32	Nafech	4,059	4,059	0.00%
33	**Mal-e Khalifeh**	4,024	3,698	+8.82%
34	Dashtak	4,016	4,016	0.00%
35	Haruni	3,601	3,601	0.00%
36	**Chelgard**	2,989	3,061	−2.35%
37	Sar Khun	2,131	2,131	0.00%
38	**Bazoft**	1,519	1,519	0.00%
39	**Manj-e Nesa**	1,492	1,486	+0.40%
40	**Samsami**	1,203	1,203	0.00%

=== East Azerbaijan province ===
Counties of East Azerbaijan Province

Rank	City	2016 Census	2011 Census	Change
1	**Tabriz**	1,558,693	1,494,998	+4.26%
2	**Maragheh**	175,255	162,275	+8.00%
3	**Marand**	130,825	124,323	+5.23%
4	**Ahar**	100,641	92,608	+8.67%
5	**Mianeh**	98,973	95,505	+3.63%
6	**Bonab**	85,274	79,894	+6.73%
7	Sahand	82,494	24,704	+233.93%
8	**Sarab**	45,031	44,846	+0.41%
9	**Azarshahr**	44,887	39,918	+12.45%
10	Hadishahr	34,346	30,575	+12.33%
11	**Ajab Shir**	33,606	26,280	+27.88%
12	Sardrud	29,739	26,856	+10.74%
13	**Malekan**	27,431	25,312	+8.37%
14	**Shabestar**	22,181	15,663	+41.61%
15	**Khosrowshah**	21,972	12,447	+76.52%
16	**Bostanabad**	21,734	17,954	+21.05%
17	**Hashtrud**	20,572	19,903	+3.36%
18	**Osku**	18,459	16,983	+8.69%
19	**Ilkhchi**	16,574	15,231	+8.82%
20	**Basmenj**	12,692	11,190	+13.42%
21	**Mamqan**	11,892	13,359	−10.98%
22	**Gugan**	11,742	11,395	+3.05%
23	**Heris**	10,515	9,823	+7.04%
24	**Yamchi**	10,392	9,832	+5.70%
25	**Sufian**	9,963	9,126	+9.17%
26	**Kaleybar**	9,324	9,887	−5.69%
27	**Jolfa**	8,810	5,628	+56.54%
28	Shendabad	8,489	9,034	−6.03%
29	**Koshksaray**	8,060	7,723	+4.36%
30	**Tasuj**	7,522	7,370	+2.06%
31	Kolvanaq	7,465	6,792	+9.91%
32	**Torkamanchay**	7,443	7,094	+4.92%
33	**Leylan**	6,356	6,175	+2.93%
34	Sis	6,106	5,502	+10.98%
35	**Bakhshayesh**	6,102	6,098	+0.07%
35	**Qarah Aghaj**	6,102	5,652	+7.96%
36	**Mehraban**	5,772	6,095	−5.30%
37	Teymurlu	5,375	5,375	0.00%
38	**Varzaqan**	5,348	5,385	−0.69%
39	Zarnaq	5,343	5,713	−6.48%
40	Sharabian	4,877	4,737	+2.96%
41	Kuzeh Kanan	4,730	3,274	+44.47%
42	Vayqan	4,678	4,298	+8.84%
43	**Hurand**	4,658	4,445	+4.79%
44	Mobarak Shahr	4,456	4,456	0.00%
45	Benab e Marand	4,311	4,371	−1.37%
46	Sharafkhaneh	4,244	3,585	+18.38%
47	**Khajeh**	4,011	3,801	+5.52%
48	Achachi	3,647	3,647	0.00%
49	Duzduzan	3,627	3,815	−4.93%
50	**Kharvana**	3,353	1,373	+144.21%
51	Khamaneh	3,056	2,541	+20.27%
52	**Tekmeh Dash**	2,974	2,645	+12.44%
53	**Aqkand**	2,902	1,733	+67.46%
54	**Abish Ahmad**	2,715	2,318	+17.13%
55	Zonuz	2,465	2,626	−6.13%
56	**Tark**	2,031	2,406	−15.59%
57	**Khomarlu**	1,902	1,659	+14.65%
58	**Kharaju**	1,824	1,584	+15.15%
59	**Siah Rud**	1,548	1,553	−0.32%
60	**Nazarkahrizi**	1,215	1,266	−4.03%
61	Jowan Qaleh	700	700	0.00%
	Malek Kian			NA
	Shahr-e Jadid-e Shahriar			

=== Isfahan province ===
Counties of Isfahan Province

Rank	City	2016 Census	2011 Census	Change
1	**Isfahan**	1,961,260	1,853,293	+5.83%
2	**Kashan**	304,487	275,325	+10.59%
3	**Khomeyni Shahr**	247,128	244,696	+0.99%
4	**Najafabad**	235,281	221,814	+6.07%
5	**Shahin Shahr**	173,329	143,308	+20.95%
6	**Shahreza**	134,952	123,767	+9.04%
7	**Fuladshahr**	88,426	66,903	+32.17%
8	Baharestan	79,023	61,647	+28.19%
9	**Mobarakeh**	69,449	66,092	+5.08%
10	**Aran va Bidgol**	65,404	60,290	+8.48%
11	**Golpayegan**	58,936	54,572	+8.00%
12	**Zarrin Shahr**	55,817	60,118	−7.15%
13	Dorcheh Piaz	47,800	44,689	+6.96%
14	**Dowlatabad**	40,945	37,098	+10.37%
15	**Falavarjan**	37,704	38,310	−1.58%
16	**Qahderijan**	34,226	31,679	+8.04%
17	Khvorzuq	29,154	22,321	+30.61%
18	**Nain**	27,379	25,379	+7.88%
19	**Semirom**	26,942	25,122	+7.24%
20	Kelishad va Sudarjan	25,635	24,355	+5.26%
21	Goldasht	25,235	23,192	+8.81%
22	Gaz	24,433	21,991	+11.10%
23	Abrisham	22,429	21,794	+2.91%
24	**Khansar**	21,883	21,338	+2.55%
25	**Tiran**	21,703	19,421	+11.75%
26	**Daran**	20,078	19,645	+2.20%
27	Sedeh Lenjan	19,101	18,654	+2.40%
28	Dizicheh	18,935	18,750	+0.99%
29	Varnamkhast	18,700	17,384	+7.57%
30	**Dehaqan**	17,945	17,108	+4.89%
31	Dastgerd	17,775	16,848	+5.50%
32	**Ardestan**	15,744	15,701	+0.27%
33	Chamgardan	15,574	16,219	−3.98%
34	**Badrud**	14,723	13,120	+12.22%
35	Imanshahr	14,633	14,267	+2.57%
36	**Natanz**	14,122	12,281	+14.99%
37	Chermahin	13,732	13,568	+1.21%
38	**Fereydunshahr**	13,603	14,007	−2.88%
39	**Pir Bakran**	13,469	12,192	+10.47%
40	Kushk	13,248	12,029	+10.13%
41	**Varzaneh**	12,714	11,924	+6.63%
42	Nushabad	11,838	10,904	+8.57%
43	Baharan Shahr	11,284	11,132	+1.37%
44	Kahriz Sang	10,442	9,264	+12.72%
45	**Bagh-e Bahadoran**	10,279	9,598	+7.10%
46	**Zibashahr**	10,200	9,668	+5.50%
47	**Chadegan**	9,924	9,738	+1.91%
47	Talkhuncheh	9,924	9,472	+4.77%
48	Golshahr	9,904	9,903	+0.01%
49	**Buin va Miandasht**	9,889	10,256	−3.58%
50	Qahjaverestan	9,712	7,906	+22.84%
51	Gorgab	9,690	6,359	+52.38%
52	**Habibabad**	9,491	9,444	+0.50%
53	Zayandeh Rud	9,463	9,514	−0.54%
54	Majlesi	9,363	4,083	+129.32%
55	**Zavareh**	8,320	7,814	+6.48%
56	**Dehaq**	8,272	7,710	+7.29%
57	**Alavijeh**	8,067	7,526	+7.19%
58	Zazeran	7,962	7,962	0.00%
59	**Harand**	7,829	7,108	+10.14%
60	Manzariyeh	7,164	6,270	+14.26%
61	Karkevand	7,058	6,857	+2.93%
62	Jowzdan	6,998	6,749	+3.69%
63	Asgharabad	6,876	6,876	0.00%
64	**Khur**	6,765	6,721	+0.65%
65	Nasrabad	6,425	6,176	+4.03%
66	Guged	6,012	6,008	+0.07%
67	**Abuzeydabad**	5,976	5,559	+7.50%
68	Vazvan	5,952	4,559	+30.55%
69	Shadpurabad	5,915	5,487	+7.80%
70	Sefidshahr	5,804	5,579	+4.03%
71	**Meymeh**	5,651	5,449	+3.71%
72	**Kuhpayeh**	5,518	4,587	+20.30%
73	Sin	5,495	5,495	0.00%
74	Golshan	5,437	5,058	+7.49%
75	Barf Anbar	5,382	5,336	+0.86%
76	Meshkat	5,357	4,869	+10.02%
77	Komeshcheh	5,100	4,871	+4.70%
78	**Sagzi**	5,063	4,698	+7.77%
79	Mohammadabad	5,032	4,549	+10.62%
80	Hana	4,922	5,354	−8.07%
81	**Asgaran**	4,858	4,521	+7.45%
82	Jandaq	4,665	4,472	+4.32%
83	**Barzok**	4,588	3,265	+40.52%
84	**Hasanabad**	4,478	4,267	+4.94%
85	Damaneh	4,366	4,617	−5.44%
86	Nikabad	4,364	4,303	+1.42%
87	Baghshad	4,356	4,356	0.00%
88	Rozveh	4,332	4,536	−4.50%
89	**Tudeshk**	4,275	4,229	+1.09%
90	Jowshaqan-e Qali	4,161	4,161	0.00%
91	Ziar	3,918	3,918	0.00%
92	**Qamsar**	3,877	3,410	+13.70%
93	**Mahabad**	3,727	3,656	+1.94%
94	Afus	3,696	4,313	−14.31%
95	Rezvanshahr	3,606	3,508	+2.79%
96	**Ezhiyeh**	3,156	3,481	−9.34%
97	Khaledabad	3,023	2,756	+9.69%
98	Farrokhi	2,968	2,502	+18.63%
99	Kamu va Chugan	2,434	2,434	0.00%
100	**Neyasar**	2,319	2,171	+6.82%
101	**Komeh**	2,184	2,146	+1.77%
102	Bafran	1,978	2,027	−2.42%
103	**Anarak**	1,903	1,477	+28.84%
104	Lay Bid	1,832	1,473	+24.37%
105	Tarq	1,749	1,749	0.00%
106	Vanak	1,665	1,977	−15.78%

=== Fars province ===
Counties of Fars Province

Rank	City	2016 Census	2011 Census	Change
1	**Shiraz**	1,565,572	1,460,665	+7.18%
2	**Marvdasht**	148,858	138,649	+7.36%
3	**Jahrom**	141,634	114,108	+24.12%
4	**Fasa**	110,825	104,809	+5.74%
5	**Kazerun**	96,683	89,685	+7.80%
6	Sadra	91,863	39,979	+129.78%
7	**Darab**	70,232	61,672	+13.88%
8	**Firuzabad**	65,417	64,969	+0.69%
9	**Lar**	62,045	65,451	−5.20%
10	**Abadeh**	59,116	55,758	+6.02%
11	**Nurabad**	57,058	55,736	+2.37%
12	**Neyriz**	49,850	50,291	−0.88%
13	**Eqlid**	44,341	44,552	−0.47%
14	**Estahban**	36,410	34,639	+5.11%
15	**Gerash**	34,469	30,593	+12.67%
16	**Zarqan**	32,261	28,958	+11.41%
17	**Kavar**	31,711	26,342	+20.38%
18	**Lamerd**	29,380	25,131	+16.91%
19	**Safashahr**	26,933	26,091	+3.23%
20	**Qaemiyeh**	26,918	25,355	+6.16%
21	**Hajjiabad**	21,675	20,501	+5.73%
22	**Farashband**	20,320	18,492	+9.89%
23	**Qir**	20,010	18,038	+10.93%
24	**Evaz**	19,987	22,401	−10.78%
25	**Khonj**	19,217	18,792	+2.26%
26	**Kharameh**	18,477	20,920	−11.68%
27	**Sarvestan**	18,187	19,116	−4.86%
28	**Arsanjan**	17,706	17,382	+1.86%
29	**Saadat Shahr**	17,131	16,876	+1.51%
30	**Qaderabad**	14,973	15,792	−5.19%
31	**Ardakan**	14,633	16,661	−12.17%
32	Dobiran	13,809	12,682	+8.89%
33	**Jannat Shahr**	13,598	11,852	+14.73%
34	**Galleh Dar**	13,448	11,354	+18.44%
35	**Soghad**	12,582	11,156	+12.78%
36	**Meymand**	10,120	9,058	+11.72%
37	Darian	10,037	9,557	+5.02%
38	**Surian**	9,776	10,670	−8.38%
39	**Zahedshahr**	9,719	9,483	+2.49%
40	**Khesht**	9,599	9,108	+5.39%
41	**Eshkanan**	9,115	8,211	+11.01%
42	**Banaruiyeh**	9,077	10,977	−17.31%
43	**Masiri**	9,031	5,830	+54.91%
44	Lapui	8,985	6,924	+29.77%
45	**Shahr-e Pir**	8,927	8,100	+10.21%
46	Karzin	8,841	8,446	+4.68%
47	**Seyyedan**	8,574	7,563	+13.37%
48	**Juyom**	8,010	8,810	−9.08%
49	**Mohr**	7,784	7,823	−0.50%
50	Bahman	7,568	7,305	+3.60%
51	**Qotbabad**	7,476	67,754	−88.97%
52	**Abadeh Tashk**	7,379	7,562	−2.42%
53	Khur	7,338	6,821	+7.58%
54	**Beyram**	7,300	7,379	−1.07%
54	Latifi	7,300	6,669	+9.46%
55	**Beyza**	7,252	4,234	+71.28%
56	Bab Anar	7,061	6,968	+1.33%
57	Qarah Bolagh	6,772	6,653	+1.79%
58	**Sedeh**	6,747	6,137	+9.94%
59	Ij	6,246	5,849	+6.79%
60	Khumeh Zar	6,220	6,095	+2.05%
61	**Konartakhteh**	6,081	5,478	+11.01%
62	**Valashahr**	5,972	4,243	+40.75%
63	**Sheshdeh**	5,960	5,562	+7.16%
64	Miyanshahr	5,912	6,257	−5.51%
65	Izadkhast	5,910	6,532	−9.52%
66	Emam Shahr	5,803	5,190	+11.81%
67	**Runiz**	5,760	5,593	+2.99%
68	**Arad**	5,094	5,574	+9.42%
69	Mobarakabad	4,707	4,235	+11.15%
70	**Varavi**	4,622	3,971	+16.39%
71	**Meshkan**	4,617	4,580	+0.81%
72	Bid Shahr	4,447	4,372	+1.72%
73	**Khavaran**	4,332	5,562	−22.11%
74	Emadshahr	4,235	4,506	−6.01%
75	Fadami	4,097	4,028	+1.71%
76	**Alamarvdasht**	4,068	4,095	−0.66%
77	**Khaneh Zenyan**	4,027	3,370	+19.50%
78	**Korehi**	3,954	3,912	+1.07%
79	Dezhkord	3,924	4,220	−7.01%
80	Hamashahr	3,852	3,233	+19.15%
81	Nujin	3,769	3,416	+10.33%
82	**Kamfiruz**	3,713	2,498	+48.64%
83	**Mazayjan**	3,567	3,041	+17.30%
84	**Dehram**	3,468	2,999	+15.64%
85	**Kuhenjan**	3,281	3,739	−12.25%
86	Khuzi	3,245	3,646	−11.00%
87	Kupon	3,237	3,225	+0.37%
88	Ahel	3,179	2,940	+8.13%
89	Hesami	3,131	2,826	+10.79%
90	Surmaq	3,050	3,458	−11.80%
91	**Asir**	3,042	2,180	+39.54%
92	**Khaniman**	3,020	3,183	−5.12%
93	**Do Borji**	2,907	2,651	+9.66%
94	**Qatruyeh**	2,895	2,764	+4.74%
95	**Nowdan**	2,892	2,574	+12.35%
96	**Kureh**	2,706	3,127	−13.46%
97	**Efzar**	2,657	2,338	+13.64%
98	**Ramjerd**	2,550	2,260	+12.83%
99	**Now Bandegan**	2,410	2,704	−10.87%
100	**Hasanabad**	2,045	1,894	+7.97%
101	**Soltan Shahr**	1,928	2,485	−22.41%
102	**Madar-e-Soleyman**	1,546	1,822	−15.15%
103	**Baba Monir**	1,379	1,764	−21.83%
104	**Duzeh**	1,348	887	+51.97%

=== Gilan province ===
Counties of Gilan Province

Rank	City	2016 Census	2011 Census	Change
1	**Rasht**	679,995	639,951	+6.26%
2	**Bandar-e Anzali**	118,564	116,664	+1.63%
3	**Lahijan**	101,073	94,051	+7.47%
4	**Langarud**	79,445	74,477	+6.67%
5	**Hashtpar**	54,178	52,344	+3.50%
6	**Astara**	51,579	48,470	+6.41%
7	**Sowme'eh Sara**	47,083	40,978	+14.90%
8	**Astaneh-ye Ashrafiyeh**	44,941	40,726	+10.35%
9	**Rudsar**	37,998	37,579	+1.11%
10	**Fuman**	35,841	30,608	+17.10%
11	**Khomam**	20,897	17,106	+22.16%
12	**Siahkal**	19,924	18,176	+9.62%
13	**Rezvanshahr**	19,519	15,267	+27.85%
14	**Masal**	17,901	14,689	+21.87%
15	Manjil	15,630	17,396	−10.15%
16	**Amlash**	15,444	14,915	+3.55%
17	**Kiashahr**	14,022	13,753	+1.96%
18	Rostamabad	13,746	13,749	−0.02%
19	Lowshan	13,032	15,193	−14.22%
20	**Sangar**	12,583	10,154	+23.92%
21	**Kelachay**	12,379	11,936	+3.71%
22	**Lavandevil**	11,235	10,617	+5.82%
23	**Asalem**	10,720	10,040	+6.77%
24	**Rahimabad**	10,571	8,719	+21.24%
25	**Lasht-e Nesha**	10,539	10,662	−1.15%
26	**Rudbar**	10,504	10,926	−3.86%
27	**Kuchesfahan**	10,026	9,450	+6.10%
28	Chaf and Chamkhaleh	8,840	4,494	+96.71%
29	**Chaboksar**	8,224	6,994	+17.59%
30	**Shaft**	8,184	6,533	+25.27%
31	**Pareh Sar**	8,016	7,626	+5.11%
32	Luleman	7,426	3,558	+108.71%
33	**Khoshk-e Bijar**	7,245	7,133	+1.57%
34	**Marjaghal**	6,735	6,471	+4.08%
35	**Kumeleh**	6,457	6,078	+6.24%
36	**Bazar Jomeh**	5,729	4,493	+27.51%
37	Chubar	5,554	5,522	+0.58%
38	Pir Bazar	5,373	??	NA
39	Shalman	5,102	5,184	−1.58%
40	**Gurab Zarmikh**	4,840	4,588	+5.49%
41	Vajargah	4,537	4,522	+0.33%
42	**Haviq**	4,261	4,194	+1.60%
43	**Lisar**	3,647	3,262	+11.80%
44	**Ziabar**	3,603	3,490	+3.24%
45	**Rudboneh**	3,441	3,646	−5.62%
46	**Chukam**	3,096	3,222	−3.91%
47	**Jirandeh**	2,320	2,584	−10.22%
48	**Rankuh**	2,154	2,224	−3.15%
49	**Ahmadsargurab**	2,128	2,346	−9.29%
50	**Otaqvar**	1,938	1,804	+7.43%
51	**Deylaman**	1,729	1,656	+4.41%
52	**Maklavan**	1,635	1,635	0.00%
53	**Barehsar**	1,612	1,416	+13.84%
54	**Tutkabon**	1,510	1,678	−10.01%
55	**Taher Gurab**	1,168	1,331	−12.25%
56	Masuleh	393	568	−30.81%

=== Golestan province ===
Counties of Golestan Province

Rank	City	2016 Census	2011 Census	Change
1	**Gorgan**	350,676	329,536	+6.42%
2	**Gonbad-e Kavus**	151,910	144,546	+5.09%
4	**Aliabad-e Katul**	52,838	49,804	+6.09%
3	**Bandar Torkaman**	53,970	48,736	+10.74%
5	**Azadshahr**	43,760	39,484	+10.83%
6	**Kordkuy**	39,881	38,246	+4.27%
7	**Kalaleh**	36,176	27,951	+29.43%
8	**Aqqala**	35,116	31,626	+11.04%
9	**Minudasht**	30,085	28,478	+5.64%
10	**Galikash**	23,394	20,831	+12.30%
11	**Bandar-e Gaz**	20,742	18,734	+10.72%
13	**Gomishan**	19,191	17,648	+8.74%
14	**Siminshahr**	17,205	15,539	+10.72%
12	**Fazelabad**	19,461	14,548	+33.77%
15	**Ramian**	12,426	12,263	+1.33%
16	**Khan Bebin**	10,878	11,007	−1.17%
18	Daland	8,184	7,992	+2.40%
19	Neginshahr	8,138	7,858	+3.56%
23	Qoroq	6,701	6,734	−0.49%
24	**Now Kandeh**	6,650	7,155	−7.06%
21	**Sarkhon Kalateh**	7,589	6,688	+13.47%
20	Jelin	7,417	7,753	−4.33%
22	**Anbar Olum**	7,003	6,540	+7.08%
17	**Maraveh Tappeh**	8,671	7,906	+9.68%
25	**Faraghi**	5,777	5,104	+13.19%
26	**Dowzeyn**	5,737	5,785	−0.83%
27	Korand	5,616	4,922	+14.10%
28	Tatar-e Olya	4,782	4,785	−0.06%
29	Alqajar	4,780	4,893	−2.31%
30	Sangdevin	4,203	4,119	+2.04%
31	Mazraeh	4,009	4,198	−4.50%
32	Yanqaq	3,919	4,073	−3.78%
33	Si Joval	3,747	3,479	+7.70%
34	**Now Deh Khanduz**	2,989	3,032	−1.42%
35	**Incheh Borun**	2,494	2,281	+9.34%
36	**Golidagh**	2,019	2,091	−3.44%
37	**Sadeqabad**	1,593	1,592	+0.06%

=== Hamadan province ===
Counties of Hamadan Province

Rank	City	2016 Census	2011 Census	Change
1	**Hamadan**	554,406	525,794	+5.44%
2	**Malayer**	170,237	159,848	+6.50%
4	**Asadabad**	55,703	55,024	+1.23%
3	**Nahavand**	76,162	75,445	+0.95%
5	**Tuyserkan**	50,455	44,516	+13.34%
6	**Bahar**	28,685	27,645	+3.76%
7	**Kabudarahang**	20,336	20,349	−0.06%
8	**Lalejin**	14,916	15,291	−2.45%
10	**Famenin**	14,208	14,478	−1.86%
9	**Razan**	14,275	13,711	+4.11%
11	Azandarian	11,171	9,324	+19.81%
12	Maryanaj	10,848	10,207	+6.28%
13	**Qorveh-e Darjazin**	9,540	10,231	−6.75%
14	Juraqan	9,234	9,262	−0.30%
15	**Giyan**	8,186	8,102	+1.04%
16	**Salehabad**	7,899	7,830	+0.88%
17	Mohajeran	7,331	7,331	0.00%
18	**Firuzan**	5,173	4,635	+11.61%
19	Sarkan	4,081	4,271	−4.45%
20	**Samen**	3,873	4,426	−12.49%
21	**Damaq**	3,231	3,783	−14.59%
22	**Qahavand**	2,970	3,115	−4.65%
23	**Ajin**	2,738	2,738	0.00%
24	**Shirin Su**	2,460	3,060	−19.61%
25	**Barzul**	2,457	2,695	−8.83%
26	**Jowkar**	2,258	2,425	−6.89%
27	**Gol Tappeh**	2,237	2,692	−16.90%
28	**Farasfaj**	1,526	1,721	−11.33%
29	**Zangeneh**	621	725	−14.34%

=== Hormozgan province ===
Counties of Hormozgan Province

Rank	City	2016 Census	2011 Census	Change
1	**Bandar Abbas**	526,648	435,751	+20.86%
2	**Minab**	73,170	63,229	+15.72%
3	**Qeshm**	40,678	28,602	+42.22%
4	**Kish**	39,853	24,819	+60.57%
5	**Rudan**	36,121	33,285	+8.52%
6	**Bandar Lengeh**	30,435	30,478	−0.14%
7	**Hajjiabad**	28,977	23,309	+24.32%
8	Kong	19,213	16,496	+16.47%
9	**Parsian**	18,045	12,544	+43.85%
10	**Jask**	16,860	13,810	+22.09%
11	**Bandar Khamir**	15,320	14,617	+4.81%
12	Dargahan	14,525	8,667	+67.59%
13	**Bastak**	9,959	9,225	+7.96%
14	**Bika**	7,190	7,002	+2.68%
15	**Jenah**	6,910	7,169	−3.61%
16	**Hasht Bandi**	6,718	4,438	+51.37%
17	**Ruydar**	6,558	6,034	+8.68%
18	**Hormuz**	5,891	5,867	+0.41%
19	**Suza**	5,707	4,712	+21.12%
20	**Qaleh Qazi**	5,286	5,183	+1.99%
21	**Sirik**	5,137	4,140	+24.08%
22	Tirur	4,871	4,362	+11.67%
23	Dashti	4,695	4,695	0.00%
24	**Kukherdharang**	4,390	4,390	0.00%
25	Tazian-e Pain	4,263	4,263	0.00%
26	**Abu Musa**	4,213	3,461	+21.73%
27	**Bandar Charak**	4,066	3,758	+8.20%
28	Garuk	4,008	4,008	0.00%
29	**Fin**	3,939	5,279	−25.38%
30	**Kushk-e Nar**	3,260	2,902	+12.34%
31	**Takht**	3,082	2,648	+16.39%
32	**Kuhestak**	3,060	3,060	0.00%
33	**Lamazan**	2,745	2,745	0.00%
34	**Ziarat-e Ali**	2,679	3,075	−12.88%
35	**Senderk**	1,915	2,024	−5.39%
36	**Fareghan**	1,773	1,925	−7.90%
37	**Sardasht**	1,725	1,536	+12.30%
38	**Gowharan**	1,170	1,316	−11.09%
39	Sargaz	1,157	1,170	−1.11%
	Dezghan			NA

=== Ilam province ===
Counties of Ilam Province

Rank	City	2016 Census	2011 Census	Change
1	**Ilam**	194,030	172,213	+12.67%
2	**Eyvan**	31,299	29,400	+6.46%
3	**Dehloran**	32,941	30,989	+6.30%
4	**Abdanan**	23,946	22,901	+4.56%
5	**Darreh Shahr**	21,900	20,712	+5.74%
6	**Mehran**	17,435	14,920	+16.86%
7	**Sarableh**	12,393	10,967	+13.00%
8	**Arkavaz**	11,977	12,358	−3.08%
9	**Asemanabad**	6,280	5,889	+6.64%
10	**Chavar**	5,831	5,775	+0.97%
11	**Badreh**	4,278	4,249	+0.68%
12	**Shabab**	4,088	4,088	0.00%
13	**Pahleh**	3,870	4,065	−4.80%
14	**Murmuri**	3,768	3,529	+6.77%
15	**Zarneh**	2,966	3,118	−4.87%
16	**Lumar**	2,696	2,658	+1.43%
17	**Musian**	2,459	2,577	−4.58%
18	**Towhid**	2,128	1,475	+44.27%
19	**Sarabbagh**	2,659	2,557	+3.99%
20	**Meymeh**	1,913	2,636	−27.43%
21	Delgosha	1,819	2,210	−17.69%
22	**Salehabad**	1,751	1,707	+2.58%
23	**Mirza Hoseynabad**	1,512	1,512	0.00%
24	**Mehr**	1,060	1,060	0.00%
25	**Balavah**	264	264	0.00%

=== Kerman province ===
Counties of Kerman Province

Rank	City	2016 Census	2011 Census	Change
1	**Kerman**	537,718	534,441	+0.61%
2	**Sirjan**	199,704	185,623	+7.59%
3	**Rafsanjan**	161,909	151,420	+6.93%
4	**Jiroft**	130,429	111,034	+17.47%
5	**Bam**	127,396	107,131	+18.92%
6	**Zarand**	60,370	57,749	+4.54%
7	**Kahnuj**	52,624	43,977	+19.66%
8	**Shahr-e Babak**	51,620	45,256	+14.06%
9	**Baft**	34,517	33,107	+4.26%
10	**Bardsir**	25,152	31,870	−21.08%
11	**Baravat**	22,761	18,633	+22.15%
12	**Ravar**	22,729	21,901	+3.78%
13	**Mohamadabad**	20,720	9,664	+114.40%
14	Najaf Shahr	20,164	9,448	+113.42%
15	**Mahan**	19,423	17,178	+13.07%
16	**Anbarabad**	18,185	18,731	−2.91%
17	**Manujan**	15,634	14,286	+9.44%
18	**Anar**	15,532	13,089	+18.66%
19	**Rudbar**	14,747	12,223	+20.65%
20	**Rabor**	13,263	11,657	+13.78%
21	**Qaleh Ganj**	13,169	12,663	+4.00%
22	**Kuhbanan**	10,761	11,093	−2.99%
23	**Darb-e Behesht**	10,670	6,538	+63.20%
24	Baghin	10,407	8,176	+27.29%
25	**Rayen**	10,286	11,006	−6.54%
33	Negar	7,600	5,731	+32.61%
39	Mes-e Sarcheshmeh	5,967	6,406	−6.85%
26	Ekhtiarabad	9,840	8,746	+12.51%
27	**Golbaf**	9,205	8,828	+4.27%
28	Zeydabad	9,112	5,260	+73.23%
29	Zangiabad	8,568	6,823	+25.58%
30	Khursand	8,252	6,672	+23.68%
31	**Pariz**	8,005	4,902	+63.30%
49	**Dehaj**	5,045	3,366	+49.88%
32	**Koshkuiyeh**	7,644	6,610	+15.64%
44	Golzar	5,445	3,411	+59.63%
34	**Mohammadabad-e Gonbaki**	7,210	7,210	0.00%
35	**Fahraj**	6,876	11,939	−42.41%
36	**Arzuiyeh**	6,868	7,555	−9.09%
37	Zeh-e Kalut	6,835	6,835	0.00%
38	**Jebalbarez**	6,750	4,416	+52.85%
40	**Chatrud**	5,860	5,344	+9.66%
41	**Yazdan Shahr**	5,607	5,442	+3.03%
42	**Nowdezh**	5,562	5,284	+5.26%
50	**Faryab**	4,863	6,025	−19.29%
51	Reyhan Shahr	4,580	4,791	−4.40%
52	Kian Shahr	4,543	5,555	−18.22%
53	Bezenjan	4,517	4,034	+11.97%
54	**Lalehzar**	4,429	2,945	+50.39%
55	Aminshahr	4,413	4,555	−3.12%
56	Dow Sari	4,130	3,762	+9.78%
45	Boluk	5,304	5,304	0.00%
46	**Bahreman**	5,265	4,528	+16.28%
47	**Narmashir**	5,222	6,167	−15.32%
48	**Shahdad**	5,217	5,942	−12.20%
43	Khatunabad	5,471	4,201	+30.23%
60	Jupar	3,607	3,937	−8.38%
61	Balvard	3,534	3,534	0.00%
62	Jowzam	3,436	4,929	−30.29%
57	Kazemabad	4,060	3,645	+11.39%
66	Khanuk	2,628	2,153	+22.06%
59	Mohiabad	3,930	3,719	+5.67%
58	Anduhjerd	4,041	3,589	+12.59%
67	Khvajeh Shahr	2,478	2,478	0.00%
-	**Safayyeh**	2,478	2,233	+10.97%
63	Hamashahr	3,311	2,800	+18.25%
64	Dashtkar	3,234	3,234	0.00%
65	**Mardehek**	2,870	2,904	−1.17%
69	Nezamshahr	2,426	2,049	+18.40%
70	**Hanza**	1,452	1,452	0.00%
71	**Hojedk**	1,007	750	+34.27%

=== Kermanshah province ===
Counties of Kermanshah Province

Rank	City	2016 Census	2011 Census	Change
1	**Kermanshah**	946,651	851,405	+11.19%
2	**Eslamabad-e Gharb**	90,559	94,699	−4.37%
4	**Kangavar**	51,352	53,449	−3.92%
7	**Harsin**	44,146	49,967	−11.65%
3	Javanrud	54,354	51,483	+5.58%
5	**Sarpol-e Zahab**	45,481	35,809	+27.01%
6	**Sonqor**	44,256	44,954	−1.55%
8	Sahneh	35,508	36,542	−2.83%
11	**Gilan-e Gharb**	22,331	20,922	+6.73%
9	**Paveh**	25,771	23,704	+8.72%
10	**Ravansar**	24,527	21,250	+15.42%
12	**Qasr-e Shirin**	18,473	17,959	+2.86%
13	**Tazehabad**	14,701	12,080	+21.70%
14	**Kerend-e Gharb**	7,798	8,311	−6.17%
16	**Gahvareh**	4,050	4,619	−12.32%
17	**Kuzaran**	4,007	3,934	+1.86%
21	Banevreh	3,187	3,187	0.00%
22	Gowdin	2,629	2,629	0.00%
19	Nowdeshah	3,683	3,077	+19.69%
18	Shahrak-e Rijab	3,907	3,907	0.00%
20	**Shahu**	3,558	3,342	+6.46%
21	**Sarmast**	2,913	2,858	+1.92%
15	**Bisotun**	4,942	5,107	−3.23%
24	**Bayangan**	1,513	1,731	−12.59%
23	**Nowsud**	1,949	1,730	+12.66%
25	**Ezgeleh**	1,502	1,256	+19.59%
26	**Homeyl**	1,317	1,363	−3.37%
27	**Satar**	1,048	1,227	−14.59%
28	**Robat**	823	940	−12.45%
30	**Miyan Rahan**	695	598	+16.22%
29	**Halashi**	804	769	+4.55%
31	**Sumar**	180	9	+1,900.00%

=== Khuzestan province ===
Counties of Khuzestan Province

Rank	City	2016 Census	2011 Census	Change
1	**Ahvaz**	1,184,788	1,112,021	+6.54%
2	**Dezful**	264,709	248,380	+6.57%
3	**Abadan**	231,476	212,744	+8.80%
4	**Bandar-e Mahshahr**	162,797	153,778	+5.86%
5	**Andimeshk**	135,116	126,811	+6.55%
6	**Khorramshahr**	133,097	129,418	+2.84%
7	**Behbahan**	122,604	107,412	+14.14%
8	**Izeh**	119,399	117,093	+1.97%
9	**Shushtar**	101,878	106,815	−4.62%
10	**Masjed Soleyman**	100,497	103,369	−2.78%
14	**Omidiyeh**	67,427	60,461	+11.52%
11	**Bandar-e Emam Khomeyni**	78,353	72,357	+8.29%
15	**Kut-e Abdollah**	56,252	56,252	0.00%
12	**Shush**	77,148	59,161	+30.40%
13	**Ramhormoz**	74,285	69,869	+6.32%
17	**Shadegan**	41,733	52,785	−20.94%
16	Susangerd	51,431	44,469	+15.66%
20	**Hendijan**	29,015	26,929	+7.75%
22	**Ramshir**	25,009	23,008	+8.70%
18	Sheyban	36,374	24,968	+45.68%
24	**Hamidiyeh**	22,057	20,982	+5.12%
23	**Gotvand**	24,216	22,822	+6.11%
21	**Bagh-e Malek**	26,343	23,352	+12.81%
19	Chamran	33,505	31,138	+7.60%
26	**Lali**	18,473	17,745	+4.10%
28	**Haftkel**	15,802	14,877	+6.22%
25	**Hoveyzeh**	19,481	16,154	+20.60%
29	**Veys**	15,312	15,105	+1.37%
27	**Mollasani**	17,337	14,813	+17.04%
30	**Aghajari**	11,912	12,653	−5.86%
31	Sharaft	11,757	10,881	+8.05%
32	Dezab	11,393	10,836	+5.14%
33	**Arvandkenar**	11,173	8,909	+25.41%
34	Shamsabad	10,858	10,858	0.00%
36	Mianrud	10,110	9,033	+11.92%
35	Qaleh Tall	10,698	10,052	+6.43%
37	Safiabad	9,879	9,046	+9.21%
38	Horr	9,177	8,624	+6.41%
39	**Hosseinabad**	8,833	9,330	−5.33%
40	**Bostan**	8,476	7,258	+16.78%
41	Chavibdeh	7,906	7,252	+9.02%
42	Elhayi	7,651	7,651	0.00%
43	**Seydun**	7,650	6,588	+16.12%
44	Saleh Shahr	7,309	7,779	−6.04%
45	**Sardasht**	6,912	6,239	+10.79%
46	**Alvan**	6,860	7,092	−3.27%
47	Hamzeh	6,091	5,850	+4.12%
48	Torkalaki	5,688	5,654	+0.60%
49	Darkhoveyn	5,655	5,759	−1.81%
54	Siah Mansur	5,406	5,406	0.00%
55	Jannat Makan	5,360	6,020	−10.96%
50	Abu Homeyzeh	5,506	5,506	0.00%
51	**Dehdez**	5,490	4,920	+11.59%
52	Cham Golak	5,446	5,446	0.00%
53	Mansuriyeh	5,441	5,441	0.00%
56	Sardaran	5,240	5,240	0.00%
57	Shahrak-e Babak	4,957	4,957	0.00%
58	Kut-e Seyyed Naim	4,541	4,541	0.00%
59	**Tashan**	4,281	4,281	0.00%
60	**Khanafereh**	3,853	3,853	0.00%
61	**Rafi**	3,797	3,690	+2.90%
62	Meydavud	3,513	3,590	−2.14%
63	Saleh Moshatat	2,973	2,769	+7.37%
64	Guriyeh	2,890	2,991	−3.38%
68	**Jayezan**	2,357	2,401	−1.83%
65	**Saland**	2,560	2,085	+22.78%
69	**Minushahr**	2,231	1,289	+73.08%
66	**Qaleh-ye Khvajeh**	2,408	2,272	+5.99%
67	Bidrubeh	2,386	2,386	0.00%
70	**Moshrageh**	2,095	1,793	+16.84%
71	**Choghamish**	2,013	2,113	−4.73%
72	**Hoseyniyeh**	1,821	1,963	−7.23%
73	Somaleh	1,784	1,606	+11.08%
74	**Abezhdan**	1,673	1,673	0.00%
75	**Zahreh**	1,192	1,277	−6.66%
76	**Golgir**	1,089	1,089	0.00%
	Moqavemat			
	Shirin Shahr			

=== Kohgiluyeh and Boyer-Ahmad province ===
Counties of Kohgiluyeh and Boyer-Ahmad Province

Rank	City	2016 Census	2011 Census	Change
1	**Yasuj**	134,532	108,505	+23.99%
2	**Dogonbadan**	96,728	91,739	+5.44%
3	**Dehdasht**	57,036	56,279	+1.35%
4	**Likak**	19,857	17,007	+16.76%
5	Madavan	18,078	10,777	+67.75%
6	**Charm**	15,218	12,634	+20.45%
7	**Landeh**	12,772	11,670	+9.44%
8	**Basht**	10,764	9,266	+16.17%
9	**Sisakht**	7,855	7,389	+6.31%
10	Suq	6,438	5,993	+7.43%
11	**Dishmok**	5,791	4,875	+18.79%
12	**Qaleh Raisi**	3,269	3,562	−8.23%
13	**Margown**	3,135	2,706	+15.85%
14	**Pataveh**	2,284	2,314	−1.30%
15	**Sarfaryab**	1,995	1,995	0.00%
16	**Chitab**	1,164	1,418	−17.91%
17	**Garab-e Sofla**	545	492	+10.77%

=== Kurdistan province ===
Counties of Kurdistan Province

Rank	City	2016 Census	2011 Census	Change
1	**Sanandaj**	412,767	373,987	+10.37%
2	**Saqqez**	165,258	139,738	+18.26%
3	**Marivan**	136,654	110,464	+23.71%
4	**Baneh**	110,218	85,190	+29.38%
5	**Qorveh**	78,276	71,232	+9.89%
6	**Kamyaran**	57,077	52,907	+7.88%
7	**Bijar**	50,014	47,926	+4.36%
8	**Divandarreh**	34,007	26,654	+27.59%
9	**Dehgolan**	25,992	23,074	+12.65%
10	Kani Dinar	13,059	11,415	+14.40%
11	**Serishabad**	7,196	7,194	+0.03%
12	Delbaran	6,713	7,076	−5.13%
13	Sarvabad	5,121	4,976	+2.91%
14	**Yasukand**	3,490	3,784	−7.77%
15	**Muchesh**	3,370	3,448	−2.26%
16	**Bolbanabad**	3,193	3,207	−0.44%
17	Aavraman Takht	3,176	3,176	0.00%
18	**Saheb**	3,101	2,294	+35.18%
19	**Armardeh**	2,305	2,349	−1.87%
20	**Dezej**	2,219	2,290	−3.10%
21	**Zarrineh**	2,091	1,854	+12.78%
22	Tup Aghaj	1,645	1,645	0.00%
23	**Buin-e Sofla**	1,518	1,458	+4.12%
24	**Shuyesheh**	1,302	1,293	+0.70%
25	**Kani Sur**	1,284	1,307	−1.76%
26	Pir Taj	1,199	1,199	0.00%
27	Bardeh Rasheh	1,020	1,020	0.00%
28	**Babarashani**	509	573	−11.17%
29	Chenareh	455	184	+147.28%

=== Lorestan province ===
Counties of Lorestan Province

Rank	City	2016 Census	2011 Census	Change
1	**Khorramabad**	373,416	348,216	+7.24%
2	**Borujerd**	234,997	240,654	−2.35%
3	**Dorud**	121,638	99,499	+22.25%
4	**Aligudarz**	89,268	87,967	+1.48%
5	**Kuhdasht**	89,091	92,927	−4.13%
6	**Nurabad**	65,547	61,142	+7.20%
7	**Azna**	47,489	40,145	+18.29%
8	**Aleshtar**	33,558	30,257	+10.91%
9	**Pol-e Dokhtar**	26,352	25,092	+5.02%
10	**Kunani**	7,768	8,242	−5.75%
11	**Mamulan**	7,656	7,502	+2.05%
12	**Chaqabol**	6,125	5,176	+18.33%
13	**Oshtorinan**	5,520	5,083	+8.60%
14	**Firuzabad**	3,399	2,876	+18.18%
15	**Garab**	3,295	3,200	+2.97%
16	**Sepiddasht**	2,917	2,545	+14.62%
17	**Zagheh**	2,776	2,685	+3.39%
18	**Chalanchulan**	2,223	1,478	+50.41%
19	**Darb-e Gonbad**	2,131	2,191	−2.74%
20	**Veysian**	2,087	1,988	+4.98%
21	**Momenabad**	1,821	1,561	+16.66%
22	**Bayranshahr**	1,720	1,409	+22.07%
23	**Sarab-e Dowreh**	1,713	1,515	+13.07%
24	Shulehabad-e Olya	1,531	1,553	−1.42%
25	Haft Cheshmeh	870	1,048	−16.98%

=== Markazi province ===
Counties of Markazi Province

Rank	City	2016 Census	2011 Census	Change
1	**Arak**	520,944	526,182	−1.00%
2	Saveh	220,762	200,481	+10.12%
3	**Khomeyn**	72,882	70,053	+4.04%
4	**Mahallat**	43,245	40,582	+6.56%
5	**Delijan**	40,902	37,470	+9.16%
6	**Mamuniyeh**	21,814	19,005	+14.78%
7	**Shazand**	21,181	21,156	+0.12%
8	Mahajeran	20,346	12,293	+65.51%
9	Tafresh	16,493	16,447	+0.28%
10	**Milajerd**	9,288	9,357	−0.74%
11	**Komijan**	8,776	9,195	−4.56%
12	**Ashtian**	8,763	9,015	−2.80%
13	**Khondab**	7,810	7,753	+0.74%
14	Shahbaz	7,536	7,536	0.00%
15	Nimvar	7,507	5,856	+28.19%
16	Astaneh	7,166	6,880	+4.16%
17	Parandak	6,886	6,633	+3.81%
18	Zaviyeh	6,027	5,877	+2.55%
19	Farmahin	5,756	4,297	+33.95%
20	Davudabad	5,491	5,252	+4.55%
21	Gharqabad	5,375	4,992	+7.67%
22	Khoshkrud	5,246	5,019	+4.52%
23	Javersiyan	4,993	4,726	+5.65%
24	Aveh	3,906	3,906	0.00%
25	Karchan	3,743	3,752	−0.24%
26	**Nowbaran**	3,334	2,170	+53.64%
27	Khenejin	3,235	3,235	0.00%
28	Naraq	2,592	2,744	−5.54%
29	Tureh	2,302	2,331	−1.24%
30	**Hendudur**	1,918	2,103	−8.80%
31	**Saruq**	1,345	1,386	−2.96%
32	**Qurchi Bashi**	1,374	1,497	−8.22%
33	**Razeghi**	826	497	+66.20%
	**Bazneh**			NA

=== Mazandaran province ===
Counties of Mazandaran Province

Rank	City	2016 Census	2011 Census	Change
1	**Sari**	309,820	296,417	+4.52%
2	**Babol**	250,217	219,467	+14.01%
3	**Amol**	237,528	219,915	+8.01%
4	**Qaem Shahr**	204,953	196,050	+4.54%
5	**Behshahr**	94,702	89,251	+6.11%
6	**Chalus**	65,196	47,881	+36.16%
7	**Neka**	60,991	50,680	+20.35%
8	**Babolsar**	59,966	50,477	+18.80%
9	**Tonekabon**	55,434	45,338	+22.27%
10	**Nowshahr**	49,403	43,378	+13.89%
11	**Fereydunkenar**	38,154	36,192	+5.42%
12	**Ramsar**	35,997	32,294	+11.47%
13	**Juybar**	32,924	29,122	+13.06%
14	**Mahmudabad**	31,844	31,771	+0.23%
15	Amirkola	30,478	28,086	+8.52%
16	**Nur**	26,947	22,978	+17.27%
17	**Galugah**	21,352	19,625	+8.80%
18	Ketalem and Sadat Shahr	20,716	18,962	+9.25%
19	**Zirab**	16,191	15,679	+3.27%
20	**Abbasabad**	13,482	11,599	+16.23%
21	**Kelardasht**	13,401	9,122	+46.91%
22	Rostamkola	11,686	11,553	+1.15%
23	**Khorramabad**	11,542	9,114	+26.64%
24	Shirud	11,377	10,429	+9.09%
25	**Chamestan**	11,194	10,617	+5.43%
26	Khalil Shahr	11,032	10,141	+8.79%
27	Hachirud	10,398		NA
28	Arateh	10,327		NA
29	**Salman Shahr**	9,656	8,654	+11.58%
30	**Surak**	9,208	8,930	+3.11%
31	**Shirgah**	8,671	8,129	+6.67%
32	Pol-e Sefid	8,294	7,708	+7.60%
33	**Kiakola**	8,040	7,691	+4.54%
34	**Bahnemir**	7,906	7,410	+6.69%
35	**Kalleh Bast**	7,889	4,097	+92.56%
36	Royan	7,731	7,102	+8.86%
37	Izadshahr	7,439	6,797	+9.45%
38	**Gatab**	7,374	7,242	+1.82%
39	**Galugah**	6,908	2,643	+161.37%
40	**Sorkhrud**	6,699	5,921	+13.14%
41	**Marzanabad**	6,698	5,789	+15.70%
42	**Nashtarud**	6,394	5,642	+13.33%
43	**Kelarabad**	6,267	5,926	+5.75%
44	**Emamzadeh Abdollah**	5,768	4,505	+28.04%
45	**Khush Rudpey**	5,742	3,317	+73.11%
46	**Babakan**	4,499		NA
47	**Zargar**	3,991	423	+843.50%
48	**Kiasar**	3,384	2,837	+19.28%
49	**Pul**	3,150	2,806	+12.26%
50	**Kojur**	3,120	3,328	−6.25%
51	**Kuhi Kheyl**	2,242	2,061	+8.78%
52	**Tabaqdeh**	2,023	2,079	−2.69%
53	**Dabudasht**	1,758	1,169	+50.38%
54	**Akand**	1,416	1,354	+4.58%
55	Alasht	1,193	874	+36.50%
56	**Rineh**	982	782	+25.58%
57	**Baladeh**	970	1,037	−6.46%
58	**Pain Hular**	956	626	+52.72%
59	**Marzikola**	868	555	+56.40%
60	**Dalkhani**	809	712	+13.62%
61	**Farim**	369	272	+35.66%
62	Gazanak	319	200	+59.50%
	Astaneh-ye Sara			NA

=== North Khorasan province ===
Counties of North Khorasan Province

Rank	City	2016 Census	2011 Census	Change
1	**Bojnord**	228,931	199,791	+14.59%
2	**Shirvan**	82,689	88,254	−6.31%
3	**Esfarayen**	59,490	60,372	−1.46%
5	**Jajarm**	19,580	18,547	+5.57%
7	**Garmeh**	10,933	10,716	+2.03%
4	**Ashkhaneh**	25,104	22,877	+9.73%
6	**Faruj**	12,061	11,731	+2.81%
8	**Raz**	5,029	5,747	−12.49%
9	Daraq	4,926	5,153	−4.41%
10	Ziarat	4,179	4,179	0.00%
14	Safiabad	3,427	3,527	−2.84%
11	Eivar	3,994	3,783	+5.58%
12	Shahrabad-e Khavar	3,993	3,993	0.00%
13	Titkanlu	3,835	3,827	+0.21%
15	Chenaran	3,380	3,380	0.00%
16	Qazi	2,428	2,956	−17.86%
17	**Shoqan**	2,313	2,436	−5.05%
18	**Sankhvast**	2,077	2,120	−2.03%
19	Pish Qaleh	2,001	2,211	−9.50%
21	Lujali	1,481	1,166	+27.02%
20	Hesar-e Garmkhan	1,499	1,658	−9.59%
22	Qushkhaneh	996	996	0.00%

=== Qazvin province ===
Counties of Qazvin Province

Rank	City	2016 Census	2011 Census	Change
1	**Qazvin**	402,748	381,598	+5.54%
2	**Alvand**	93,836	88,711	+5.78%
6	Eqbaliyeh	55,066	55,498	−0.78%
4	**Takestan**	80,299	77,907	+3.07%
5	**Abyek**	60,107	55,779	+7.76%
3	**Mohammadiyeh**	90,513	48,862	+85.24%
9	Bidestan	18,060	19,996	−9.68%
7	Mahmudabad Nemuneh	21,982	21,796	+0.85%
8	**Buin Zahra**	20,823	18,210	+14.35%
9	Sharifiyeh	20,347	21,009	−3.15%
10	**Shal**	15,290	14,996	+1.96%
11	**Esfarvarin**	12,371	12,615	−1.93%
12	**Danesfahan**	9,434	9,545	−1.16%
13	**Ziaabad**	8,262	8,637	−4.34%
14	**Khorramdasht**	6,554	6,725	−2.54%
16	Narjeh	5,604	5,404	+3.70%
15	**Abgarm**	6,336	5,998	+5.64%
17	Sagzabad	5,492	5,440	+0.96%
19	**Ardak**	5,043	5,123	−1.56%
18	**Avaj**	5,142	5,609	−8.33%
20	**Khak-e Ali**	3,148	3,352	−6.09%
21	**Moallem Kalayeh**	2,223	1,607	+38.33%
22	**Kuhin**	1,411	1,622	−13.01%
23	**Razmian**	1,253	1,164	+7.65%
24	Sirdan	805	1,038	−22.45%

=== Qom province ===
Counties of Qom Province

Rank	City	2016 Census	2011 Census	Change
1	**Qom**	1,201,158	1,074,036	+11.84%
2	Qanavat	11,667	9,662	+20.75%
3	**Jafariyeh**	9,387	7,203	+30.32%
4	**Kahak**	4,837	2,906	+66.45%
5	**Dastjerd**	1,525	1,334	+14.32%
6	**Salafchegan**	1,390	730	+90.41%

=== Razavi Khorasan province ===
Counties of Razavi Khorasan Province

Rank	City	2016 Census	2011 Census	Change
1	**Mashhad**	3,001,184	2,766,258	+8.49%
2	**Nishapur**	264,375	239,185	+10.53%
3	**Sabzevar**	243,700	231,557	+5.24%
4	**Torbat-e Heydarieh**	140,019	131,150	+6.76%
5	**Kashmar**	102,282	90,200	+13.39%
6	**Quchan**	101,604	103,760	−2.08%
7	**Torbat-e Jam**	100,449	94,758	+6.01%
8	**Taybad**	56,562	52,280	+8.19%
9	**Chenaran**	53,879	48,567	+10.94%
10	**Sarakhs**	42,179	37,162	+13.50%
11	**Gonabad**	40,773	36,367	+12.12%
12	**Fariman**	39,515	36,550	+8.11%
13	Shahr Jadid-e Golbahar	36,877	36,877	0.00%
14	**Dargaz**	36,762	37,054	−0.79%
15	**Khaf**	33,189	28,444	+16.68%
16	**Bardaskan**	28,233	26,107	+8.14%
17	**Torqabeh**	20,998	16,718	+25.60%
18	**Feyzabad**	18,120	16,253	+11.49%
19	**Neqab**	14,783	13,614	+8.59%
20	**Shandiz**	13,987	10,428	+34.13%
21	Kharv	13,535	14,115	−4.11%
22	**Khalilabad**	12,751	11,094	+14.94%
23	**Sangan**	12,443	9,500	+30.98%
24	**Bajestan**	11,741	11,133	+5.46%
25	Kariz	11,102	10,391	+6.84%
26	Mashhad Rizeh	10,105	9,211	+9.71%
27	**Dowlatabad**	9,329	9,606	−2.88%
30	**Bakharz**	9,044	8,392	+7.77%
31	**Razaviyeh**	8,850	4,542	+94.85%
32	**Salehabad**	8,625	9,642	−10.55%
33	Farhadgerd	8,442	7,647	+10.40%
34	Golmakan	8,373	9,534	−12.18%
35	Ahmadabad-e Sowlat	8,326	6,758	+23.20%
39	**Nasrabad**	7,460	7,757	−3.83%
40	Nilshahr	7,371	6,797	+8.44%
29	Nashtifan	9,176	7,426	+23.57%
36	**Kalat**	7,687	7,532	+2.06%
41	**Jangal**	6,650	6,490	+2.47%
37	**Salami**	7,555	6,581	+14.80%
28	**Joghatai**	9,268	8,212	+12.86%
43	**Anabad**	6,186	5,739	+7.79%
42	Kondor	6,460	6,002	+7.63%
38	**Roshtkhar**	7,514	6,686	+12.38%
46	**Firuzeh**	5,884	5,769	+1.99%
47	Darrud	5,717	5,449	+4.92%
44	Sefid Sang	6,129	5,545	+10.53%
45	**Soltanabad**	5,932	5,495	+7.95%
48	Rivash	5,687	5,762	−1.30%
49	Bidokht	5,501	5,348	+2.86%
50	Qasemabad	5,145	4,414	+16.56%
51	**Qalandarabad**	4,880	4,924	−0.89%
52	**Kakhk**	4,625	4,413	+4.80%
53	**Rud Ab**	4,028	4,042	−0.35%
55	Bar	3,765	4,121	−8.64%
56	**Shahr-e Zow**	3,745	4,089	−8.41%
58	**Bayg**	3,545	3,577	−0.89%
59	**Yunesi**	3,426	3,504	−2.23%
54	**Shadmehr**	3,825	3,678	+4.00%
57	**Kadkan**	3,719	3,788	−1.82%
61	Qadamgah	3,010	3,714	−18.96%
62	**Davarzan**	2,744	2,702	+1.55%
63	**Now Khandan**	2,634	2,662	−1.05%
64	**Chapeshlu**	2,374	2,474	−4.04%
60	**Sheshtomad**	3,108	4,172	−25.50%
65	**Shahrabad**	2,083	2,255	−7.63%
68	**Lotfabad**	1,865	1,790	+4.19%
69	**Robat-e Sang**	1,551	1,721	−9.88%
70	Chekneh	1,381	1,834	−24.70%
67	Eshqabad	1,993	1,883	+5.84%
71	Hemmatabad	1,274	1,434	−11.16%
66	**Malekabad**	2,056	1,487	+38.26%
72	**Mazdavand**	1,241	1,559	−20.40%
73	**Bajgiran**	594	406	+46.31%

=== Semnan province ===
Counties of Semnan Province

Rank	City	2016 Census	2011 Census	Change
1	**Semnan**	185,129	153,680	+20.46%
2	**Shahrud**	150,129	140,474	+6.87%
3	**Damghan**	59,106	58,770	+0.57%
4	**Garmsar**	48,672	40,985	+18.76%
5	Mehdishahr	24,485	19,854	+23.33%
10	**Aradan**	6,257	5,626	+11.22%
6	**Eyvanki**	13,518	11,995	+12.70%
9	**Bastam**	8,609	7,712	+11.63%
8	**Sorkheh**	9,951	9,711	+2.47%
7	Shahmirzad	11,191	8,882	+26.00%
12	Mojen	5,932	5,456	+8.72%
13	Kalateh Khij	5,651	5,057	+11.75%
11	Darjazin	5,997	4,964	+20.81%
16	**Meyami**	4,566	4,562	+0.09%
15	Kalateh Rudbar	4,611	4,611	0.00%
14	Dibaj	5,647	3,774	+49.63%
19	**Beyarjomand**	2,528	2,441	+3.56%
18	**Amiriyeh**	3,561	2,402	+48.25%
17	Rudiyan	3,770	3,770	0.00%
20	Kohanabad	1,192	1,192	0.00%

=== Sistan and Baluchestan province ===
Counties of Sistan and Baluchestan Province

Rank	City	2016 Census	2011 Census	Change
1	**Zahedan**	587,730	560,725	+4.82%
2	**Zabol**	134,950	137,722	+2.05%
3	**Iranshahr**	113,750	97,012	+17.25%
4	**Chabahar**	106,739	85,633	+24.65%
5	**Saravan**	60,114	59,795	+0.53%
6	**Khash**	56,584	54,105	+4.58%
7	**Konarak**	43,258	35,630	+21.41%
8	**Jaleq**	18,098	17,546	+3.15%
9	**Nik Shahr**	17,732	15,889	+11.60%
10	**Pishin**	16,011	13,690	+16.95%
12	**Zehak**	13,357	14,324	−6.75%
16	**Qasr-e Qand**	11,605	8,563	+35.52%
11	**Suran**	13,580	10,632	+27.73%
13	**Fanuj**	13,070	11,577	+12.90%
15	**Bampur**	12,217	10,071	+21.31%
14	**Mehrestan**	12,245	10,112	+21.09%
17	Mohammadan	10,302	8,193	+25.74%
18	**Galmurti**	10,292	8,310	+23.85%
19	**Rasak**	10,115	8,472	+19.39%
20	**Mirjaveh**	9,359	10,121	−7.53%
21	**Dust Mohammad**	6,621	6,774	−2.26%
22	**Bent**	5,822	5,294	+9.97%
26	**Nosratabad**	5,238	4,270	+22.67%
27	**Bazman**	5,192	4,702	+10.42%
23	**Negur**	5,670	4,612	+22.94%
24	Mohammadi	5,606	5,206	+7.68%
32	Bonjar	3,760	4,088	−8.02%
28	Gosht	4,992	5,145	−2.97%
29	Ali Akbar	4,779	4,551	+5.01%
30	**Espakeh**	4,719	3,636	+29.79%
31	Zarabad	4,003	3,222	+24.24%
33	**Adimi**	3,613	3,328	+8.56%
25	**Nukabad**	5,261	3,193	+64.77%
34	**Mohammadabad**	3,468	2,681	+29.35%
35	**Sirkan**	2,196	1,499	+46.50%
37	**Hiduj**	1,674	1,526	+9.70%
36	**Sarbaz**	2,020	1,230	+64.23%
	Ramshar			NA

=== South Khorasan province ===
Counties of South Khorasan Province

Rank	City	2016 Census	2011 Census	Change
1	**Birjand**	203,636	178,020	+14.39%
2	**Qaen**	42,323	40,226	+5.21%
3	**Tabas**	39,676	35,150	+12.88%
4	**Ferdows**	28,695	25,968	+10.50%
5	**Nehbandan**	18,304	18,827	−2.78%
6	**Boshruyeh**	16,426	15,318	+7.23%
7	**Sarayan**	13,795	13,247	+4.14%
8	**Sarbisheh**	8,715	8,203	+6.24%
9	Eslamiyeh	7,108	6,084	+16.83%
14	Ayask	5,143	4,756	+8.14%
12	Khezri Dasht Beyaz	5,680	5,761	−1.41%
18	**Eshqabad**	3,965	4,623	−14.23%
10	**Hajjiabad**	6,168	5,918	+4.22%
13	Asadiyeh	5,460	5,804	−5.93%
17	**Seh Qaleh**	4,436	4,242	+4.57%
15	Nimbeluk	4,762	4,393	+8.40%
16	Tabas-e Masina	4,596	4,133	+11.20%
11	**Khusf**	5,716	4,920	+16.18%
20	Esfeden	3,598	3,530	+1.93%
19	**Arianshahr**	3,729	3,585	+4.02%
24	**Deyhuk**	2,959	3,346	−11.57%
22	**Mud**	3,477	3,067	+13.37%
23	**Shusef**	3,181	3,010	+5.68%
25	**Eresk**	2,955	2,954	+0.03%
26	Qohestan	2,322	3,028	−23.32%
27	**Gazik**	2,294	2,934	−21.81%
28	**Zohan**	1,118	1,419	−21.21%
21	Mohammadshahr	3,590	1,707	+110.31%

=== Tehran province ===
Counties of Tehran Province

Rank	City	2016 Census	2011 Census	Change
1	**Tehran**	8,693,706	8,154,051	+6.62%
2	**Eslamshahr**	448,129	389,102	+15.17%
6	**Golestan**	239,556	259,480	−7.68%
4	**Qods**	309,605	283,517	+9.20%
5	**Malard**	281,027	290,817	−3.37%
9	**Varamin**	225,628	218,991	+3.03%
3	**Shahriar**	309,607	249,473	+24.10%
8	**Qarchak**	231,075	191,588	+20.61%
10	**Nasimshahr**	200,393	157,474	+27.25%
7	**Pakdasht**	236,319	206,490	+14.45%
16	**Pardis**	73,363	37,257	+96.91%
11	Andisheh	116,062	96,807	+19.89%
12	**Robat Karim**	105,393	78,097	+34.95%
13	Parand	97,464	97,464	0.00%
19	Salehieh	58,683	56,356	+4.13%
22	**Damavand**	48,380	37,315	+29.65%
17	Baqershahr	65,388	59,091	+10.66%
14	Baghestan	83,934	71,861	+16.80%
15	Bumahen	79,034	53,451	+47.86%
21	**Chahardangeh**	49,950	46,299	+7.89%
18	**Pishva**	59,184	47,253	+25.25%
20	Sabashahr	53,971	47,123	+14.53%
24	**Kahrizak**	37,527	13,095	+186.58%
26	Vahidieh	33,249	28,405	+17.05%
28	Nasirshahr	28,644	26,935	+6.34%
25	Ferdowsieh	34,221	24,508	+39.63%
23	**Hasanabad**	43,922	27,859	+57.66%
27	Safadasht	32,476	19,233	+68.86%
29	**Rudehen**	28,533	21,477	+32.85%
30	Shahedshahr	25,544	20,865	+22.43%
31	Ferunabad	21,682	14,437	+50.18%
33	Lavasan	18,146	15,706	+15.54%
34	**Firuzkuh**	17,453	20,371	−14.32%
35	Ahmadabad-e Mostowfi	14,077	14,077	0.00%
36	Absard	10,648	9,202	+15.71%
32	**Sharifabad**	18,281	12,332	+48.24%
37	**Fasham**	6,945	7,994	−13.12%
38	**Javadabad**	4,844	4,903	−1.20%
39	Shemshak	3,423	3,423	0.00%
40	Kilan	2,882	2,981	−3.32%
41	Abali	2,758	2,522	+9.36%
42	**Arjomand**	1,124	1,114	+0.90%

=== West Azerbaijan province ===
Counties of West Azerbaijan Province

Rank	City	2016 Census	2011 Census	Change
1	**Urmia**	736,224	667,499	+10.30%
2	**Khoy**	198,845	200,958	−1.05%
3	**Bukan**	193,501	170,600	+13.42%
4	**Mahabad**	168,393	147,268	+14.34%
5	**Miandoab**	134,425	123,081	+9.22%
6	**Salmas**	92,811	88,196	+5.23%
7	**Piranshahr**	91,515	69,049	+32.54%
8	**Naqadeh**	81,598	75,550	+8.01%
9	**Takab**	49,677	44,040	+12.80%
10	**Maku**	46,581	42,751	+8.96%
11	**Sardasht**	46,412	42,167	+10.07%
12	**Shahin Dezh**	43,131	38,396	+12.33%
13	**Oshnavieh**	39,801	32,723	+21.63%
14	**Qarah Zia od Din**	26,767	23,769	+12.61%
15	**Showt**	25,381	21,047	+20.59%
16	**Siah Cheshmeh**	17,804	15,786	+12.78%
17	Rabat	15,750	12,068	+30.51%
18	**Poldasht**	11,472	9,963	+15.15%
19	**Bazargan**	9,979	9,551	+4.48%
20	**Chahar Borj**	9,406	8,681	+8.35%
21	**Mohammadyar**	9,313	8,604	+8.24%
22	Firuraq	9,190	8,837	+3.99%
23	Tazeh Shahr	8,629	8,864	−2.65%
24	**Nushin**	8,380	7,183	+16.66%
25	Dizaj Diz	8,282	7,896	+4.89%
26	Mahmudabad	6,866	6,680	+2.78%
27	**Mirabad**	6,000	5,430	+10.50%
28	**Qatur**	5,147	4,663	+10.38%
29	**Baruq**	4,225	4,118	+2.60%
30	**Gerd Kashaneh**	4,201	1,673	+151.11%
31	**Keshavarz**	4,138	3,904	+5.99%
32	**Ivughli**	3,320	3,167	+4.83%
33	**Nalus**	2,973	2,938	+1.19%
34	**Qushchi**	2,787	2,526	+10.33%
35	**Nazok-e Olya**	2,667	2,761	−3.40%
36	**Marganlar**	2,294	2,247	+2.09%
37	**Serow**	1,800	1,530	+17.65%
38	**Avajiq**	1,663	1,516	+9.70%
39	**Silvaneh**	1,614	1,490	+8.32%
40	**Simmineh**	1,345	1,173	+14.66%
41	**Zurabad**	1,147	1,239	−7.43%
42	**Khalifan**	749	962	−22.14%

=== Yazd province ===
Counties of Yazd Province

Rank	City	2016 Census	2011 Census	Change
1	**Yazd**	529,673	486,152	+8.95%
2	**Meybod**	80,712	66,907	+20.63%
3	**Ardakan**	75,271	56,776	+32.58%
4	Hamidiya	51,793	37,428	+38.38%
5	**Bafq**	45,453	33,882	+34.15%
6	**Mehriz**	34,237	28,483	+20.20%
7	**Abarkuh**	27,524	23,986	+14.75%
8	**Ashkezar**	19,123	15,663	+22.09%
9	**Taft**	18,464	15,717	+17.48%
10	Shahediyeh	18,309	16,571	+10.49%
11	**Herat**	13,032	12,392	+5.16%
12	**Zarach**	11,691	10,753	+8.72%
13	**Marvast**	9,379	8,865	+5.80%
14	**Behabad**	9,232	7,652	+20.65%
15	**Mehrdasht**	8,097	7,390	+9.57%
16	Bafruiyeh	6,939	6,486	+6.98%
17	Ahmadabad	6,046	5,019	+20.46%
18	Nadushan	2,351	2,332	+0.81%
19	**Aqda**	1,754	1,809	−3.04%
20	**Nir**	1,740	1,620	+7.41%
21	**Khezrabad**	535	581	−7.92%
	Majumard			NA

=== Zanjan province ===
Counties of Zanjan Province

Rank	City	2016 Census	2011 Census	Change
1	**Zanjan**	430,871	386,851	+11.38%
2	**Abhar**	99,285	87,396	+13.60%
3	**Khorramdarreh**	55,368	52,548	+5.37%
4	**Qeydar**	34,921	30,251	+15.44%
5	Hidaj	13,840	13,003	+6.44%
6	Sain Qaleh	12,989	11,939	+8.79%
7	**Ab Bar**	8,091	6,725	+20.31%
8	**Soltaniyeh**	7,638	7,116	+7.34%
9	**Sojas**	7,037	6,666	+5.57%
10	Sohrevard	6,991	6,104	+14.53%
11	**Zarrin Rud**	5,664	5,530	+2.42%
12	**Mah Neshan**	5,487	5,439	+0.88%
13	**Dandi**	4,778	3,952	+20.90%
14	**Garmab**	3,823	4,021	−4.92%
15	Nurbahar	3,644	3,644	0.00%
16	Karasf	3,083	3,083	0.00%
17	**Zarrinabad**	2,374	2,471	−3.93%
18	**Armaghankhaneh**	2,149	1,945	+10.49%
19	**Chavarzaq**	1,733	1,753	−1.14%
20	**Halab**	956	1,089	−12.21%
21	Nik Pey	455	455	0.00%

== Ancient cities ruins ==
- Chogha Zanbil
- Ecbatana
- Istakhr
- Naqsh-e Rustam
- Pasargadae
- Persepolis
- Shahr-e Sukhteh
- Susa
- Takht-e Soleymān
- Tepe Sialk

== Gallery ==
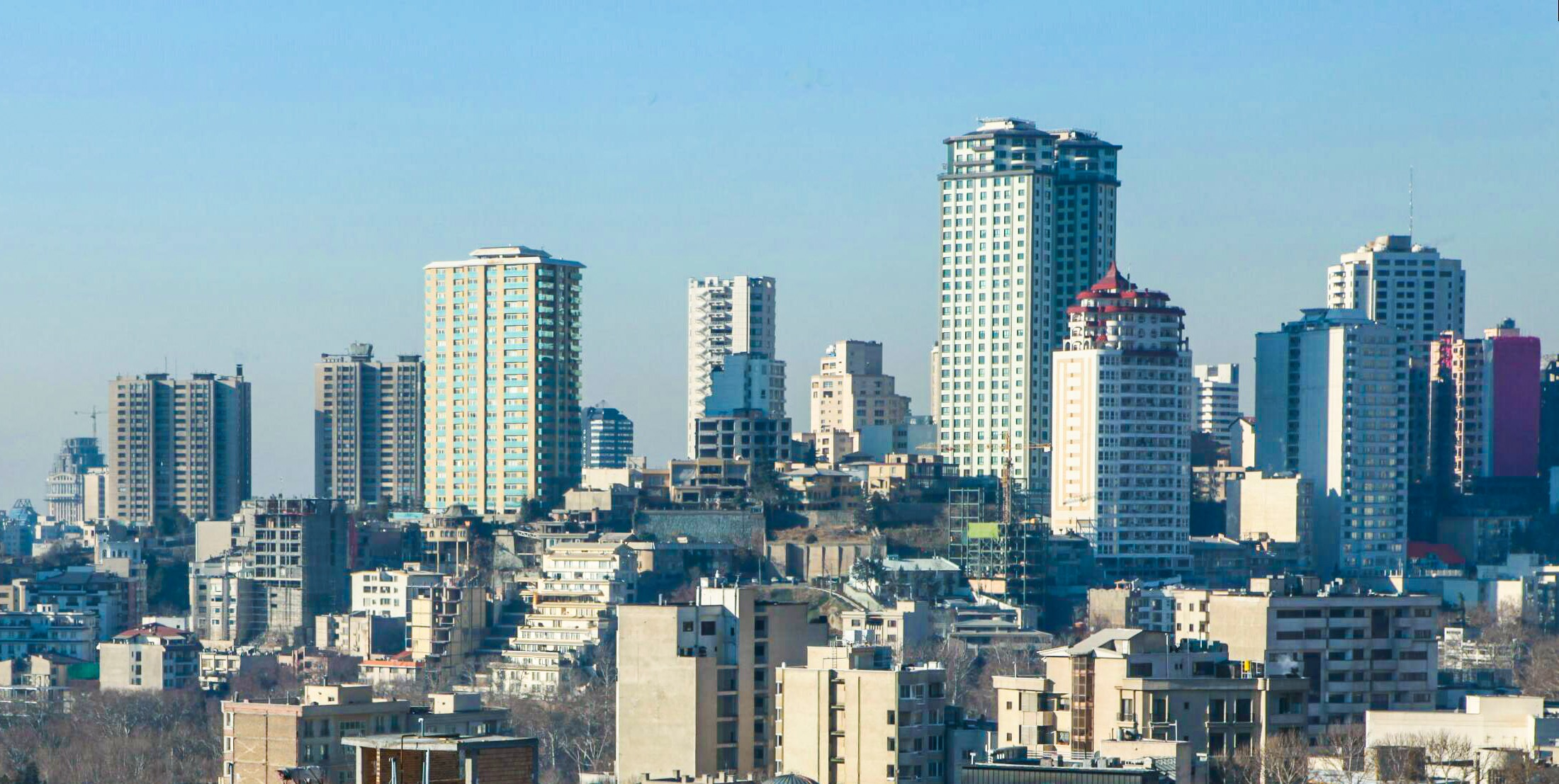
1. Tehran, Tehran province

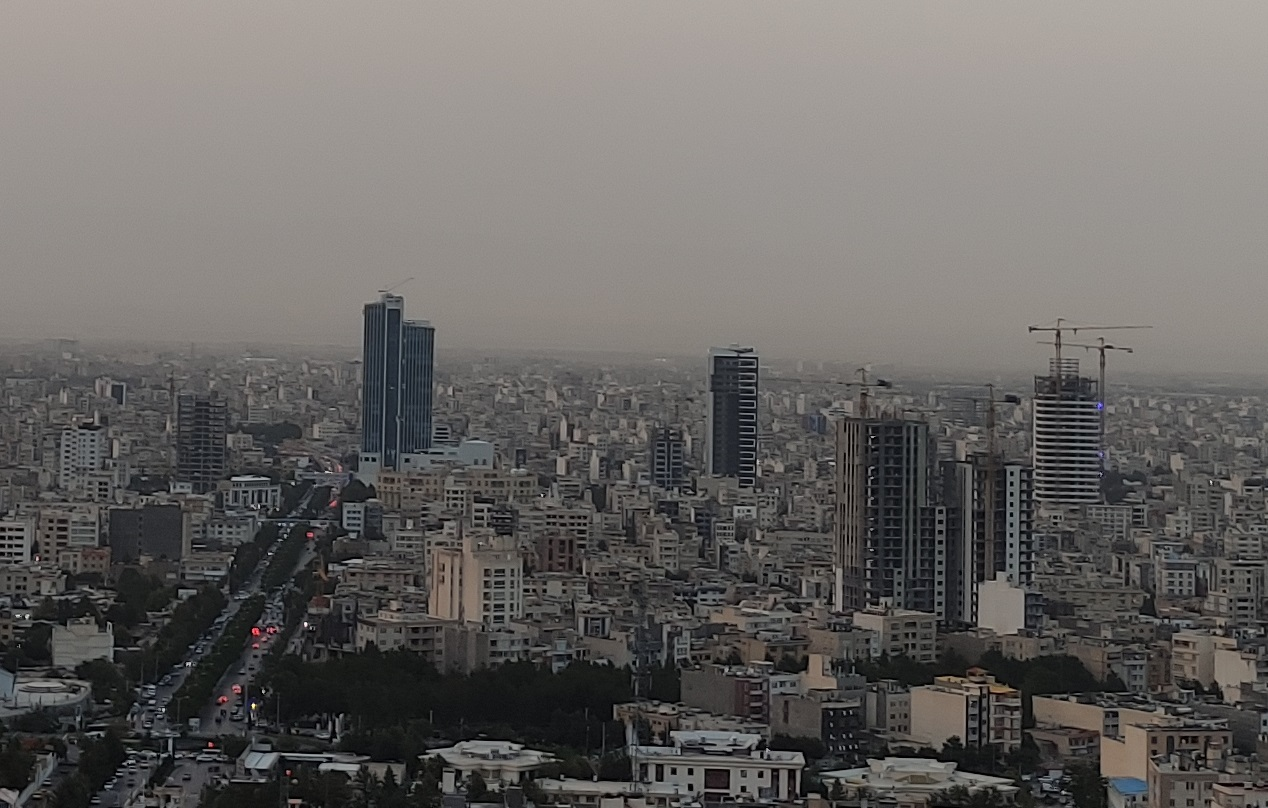
2. Mashhad, Khorasan Razavi province

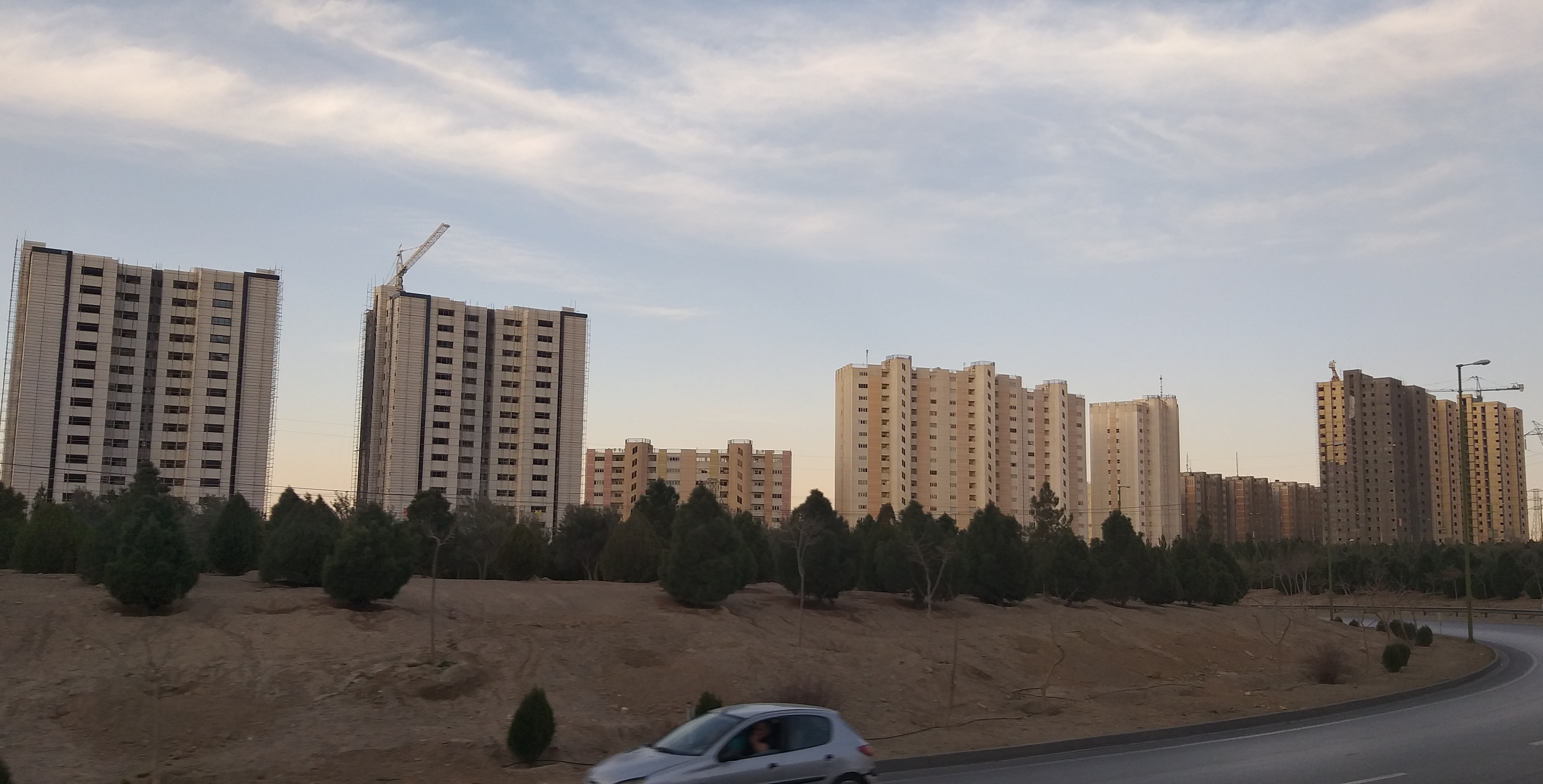
3. Isfahan, Isfahan province

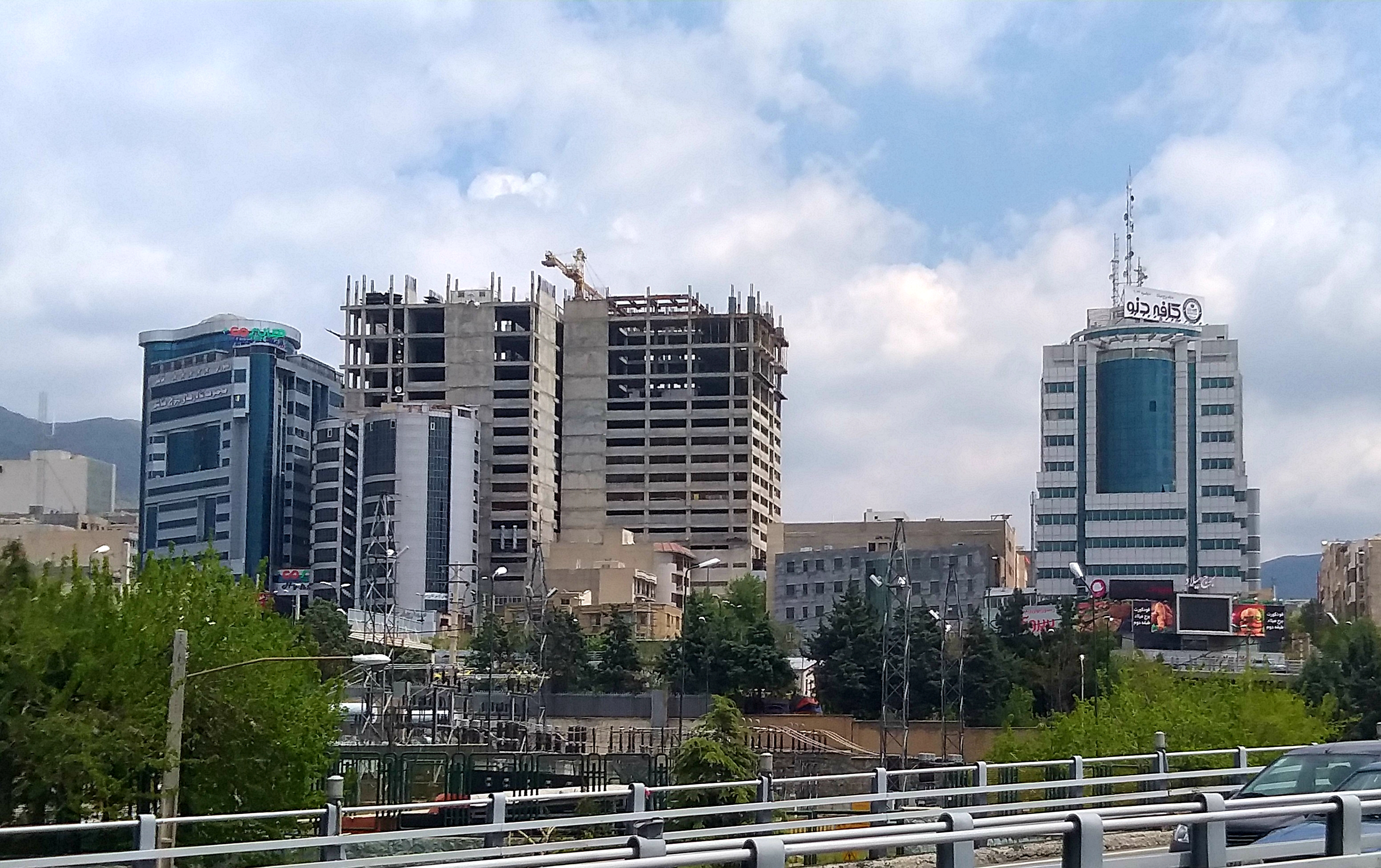
4. Karaj, Alborz province

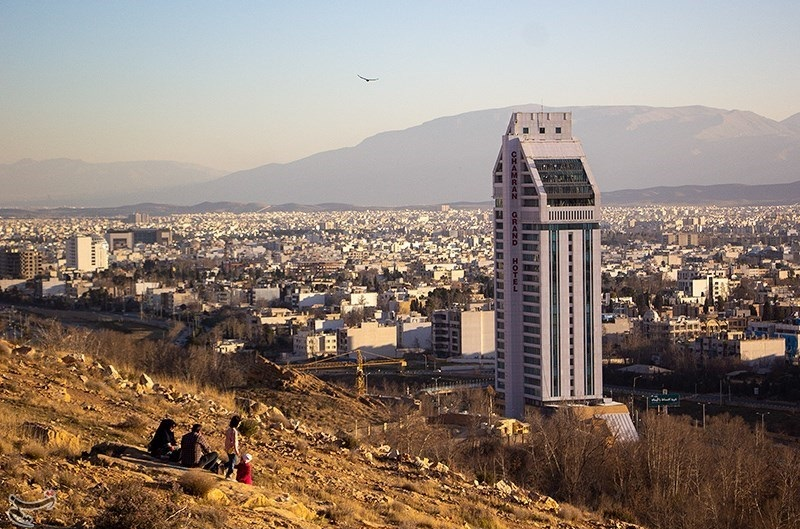
5. Shiraz, Fars province

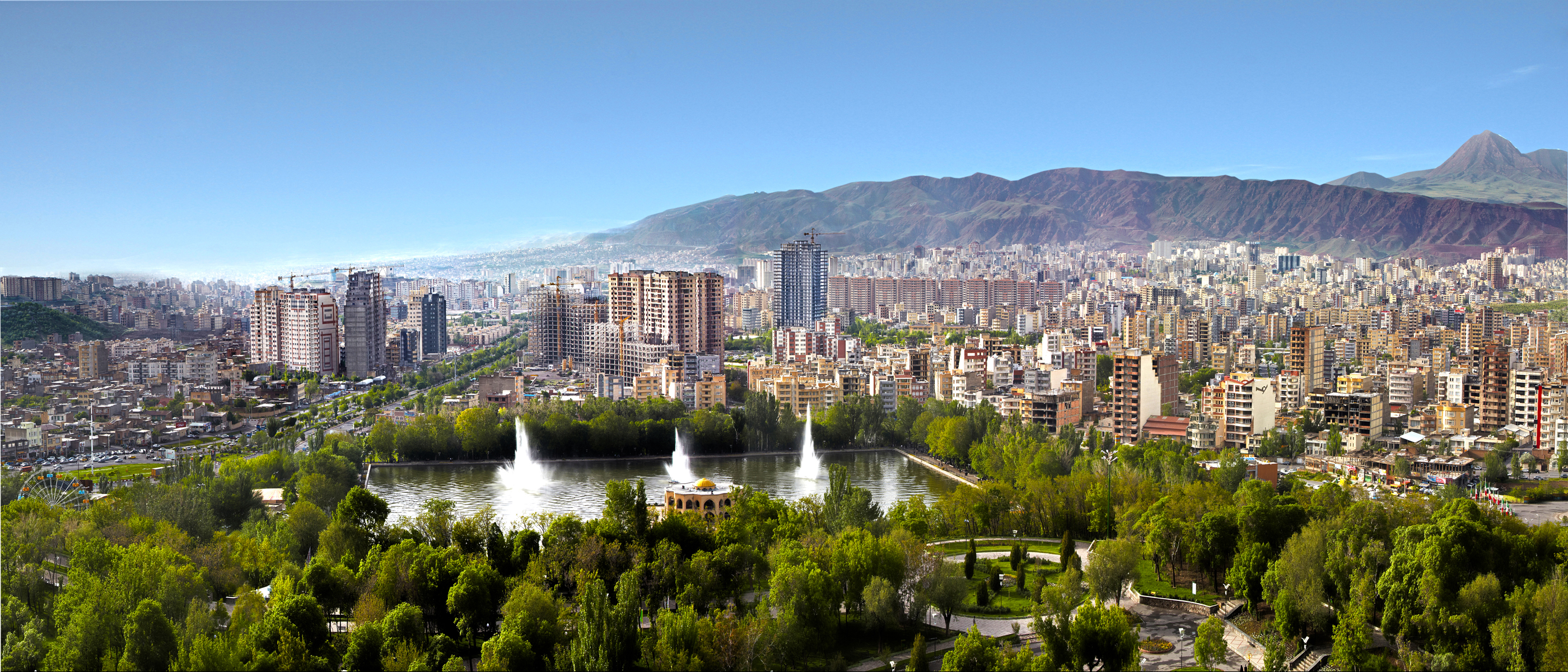
6. Tabriz, East Azerbaijan province

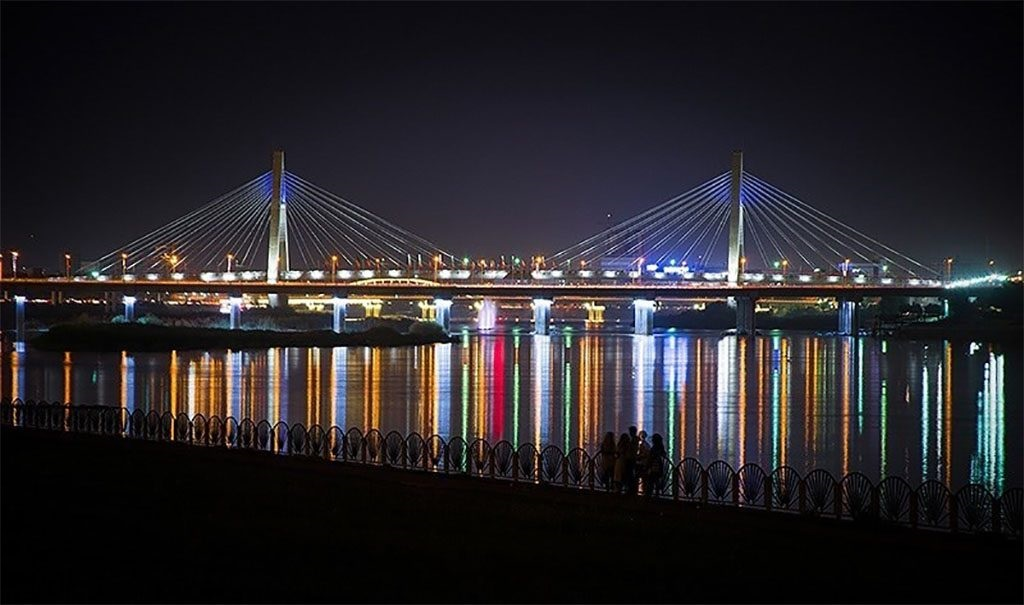
7. Ahvaz, Khūzestān province

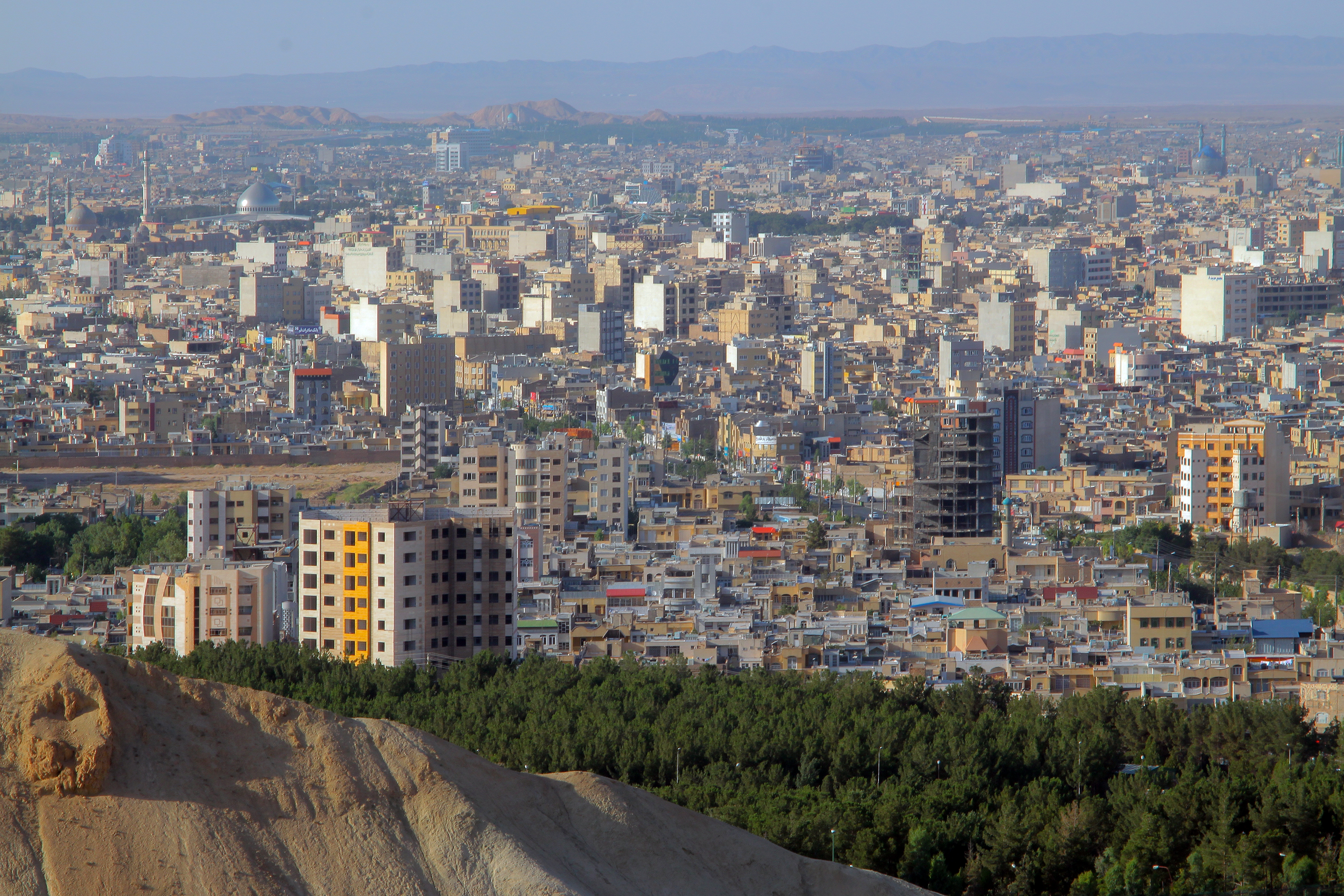
8. Qom, Qom province

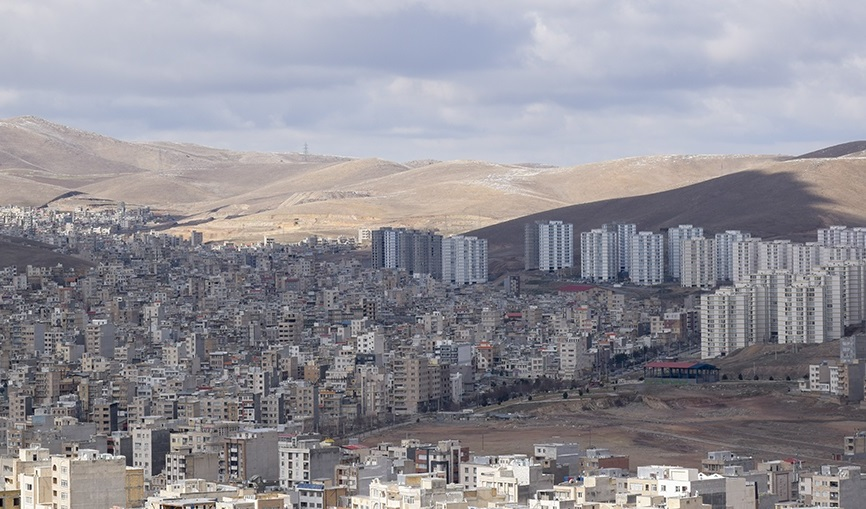
9. Kermanshah, Kermanshah province

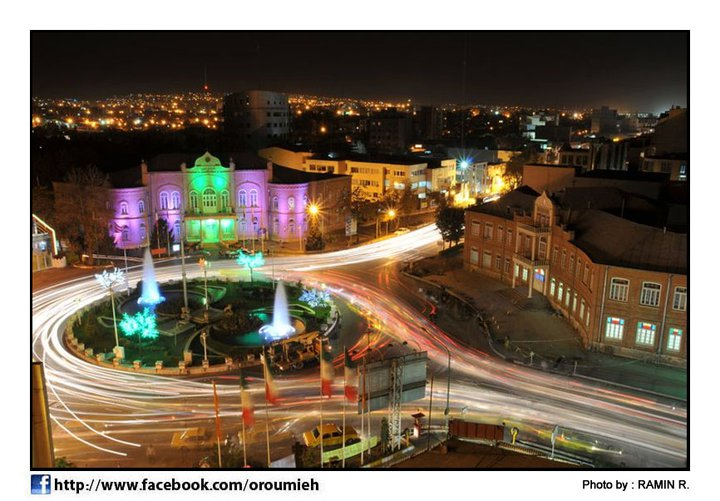
10. Urmia, West Azerbaijan province

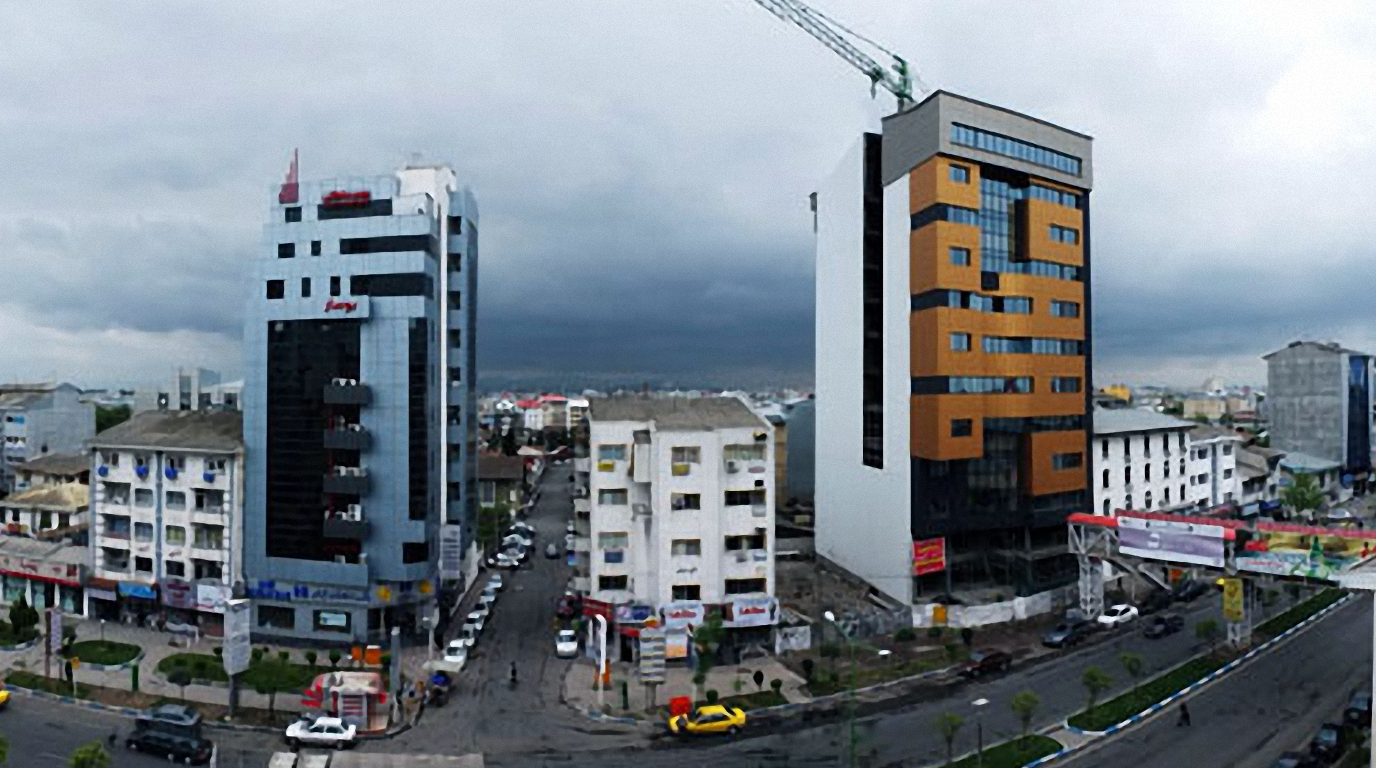
11. Rasht, Gilan province

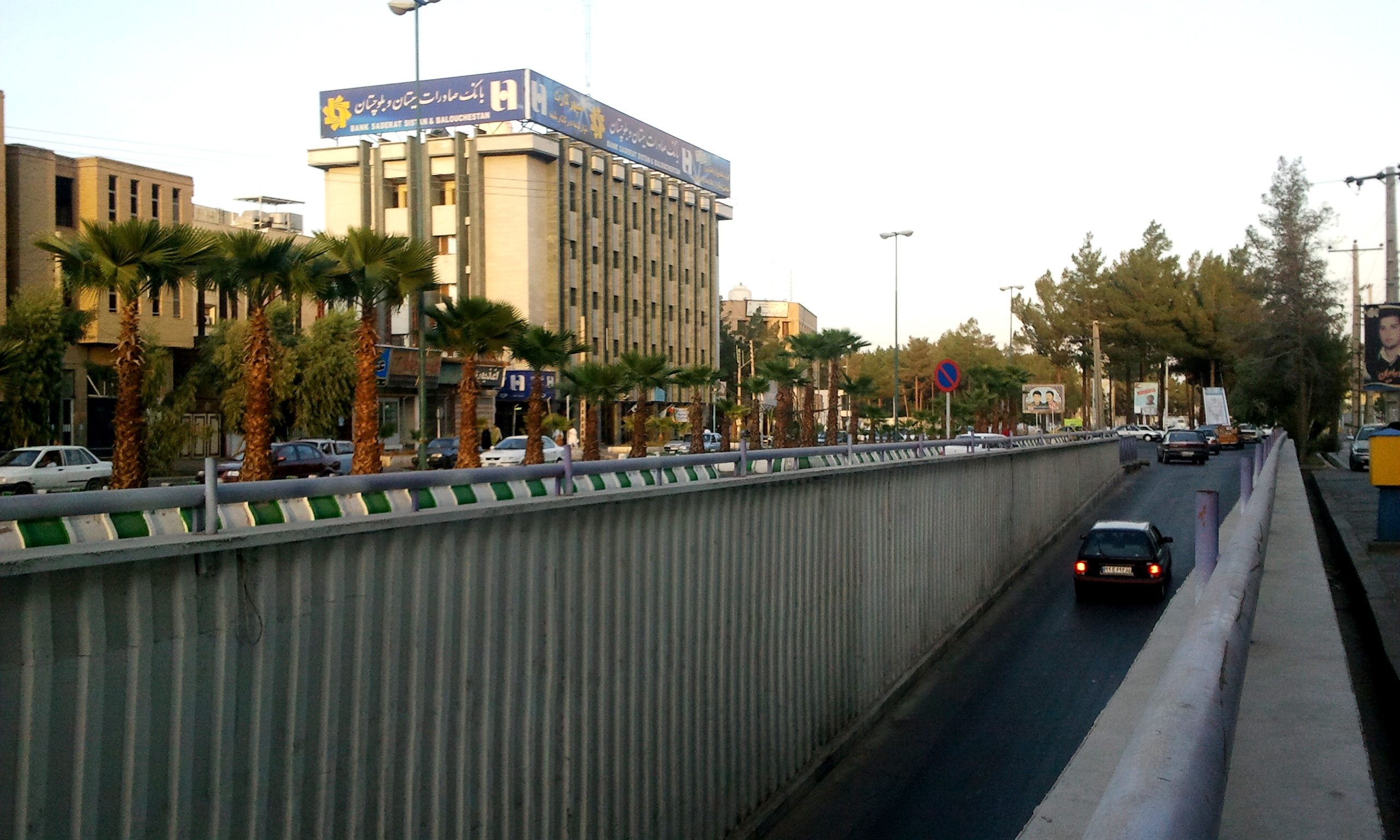
12. Zahedan, Sistan and Baluchestan province

== See also ==
- Counties of Iran
- International rankings of Iran
- List of castles in Iran
- List of caves in Iran
- List of cities in Asia
- List of current Iran governors-general
- List of earthquakes in Iran
- List of Iranian four-thousanders
- List of lighthouses in Iran
- Provinces of Iran

== Bibliography ==
- Laurence Lockhart (1960). Persian Cities. London. OCLC 1370385.
- Fredy Bemont. Les Villes de l'Iran (in French). OCLC 489929494. 1969–1973
- Michael E. Bonine (1979). "Morphogenesis of Iranian Cities". Annals of the Association of American Geographers. 69 (2): 208–224. doi:10.1111/j.1467-8306.1979.tb01252.x. JSTOR 2563066.
- Heinz Gaube (1979). Iranian Cities. New York University Press. ISBN 0814729711.
- Fisher, William Bayne; Avery, P.; Hambly, G. R. G.; Gershevitch, Ilya; Melville, C.; Boyle, John Andrew; Frye, Richard Nelson; Yarshater, Ehsan; Jackson, Peter; Lockhart, Laurence (1991). "Traditional Iranian City in the Qajar Period". From Nadir Shah to the Islamic Republic. Vol. 7. Cambridge University Press. pp. 542+. ISBN 9780521200950.
- Masoud Kheirabadi (2000). Iranian Cities: Formation and Development. Syracuse University Press. ISBN 978-0-8156-2860-6.
- Eckart Ehlers (2011) [1991]. "Cities: Modern Urbanization and Modernization in Persia". Encyclopædia Iranica.
