= Bavers =

Village in Qazvin province, Iran

Bavers Persian: باورس
- Village
- Location within Iran
- Coordinates: 36°14′56″N 50°13′11″E
- Country: Iran
- Province: Qazvin
- County: Alborz
- District: Mohammadiyeh
- Rural District: Hesar Kharvan

Population (2016)
  - Total: 2,147
- Time zone: UTC+3:30 (IRST)

Bavers (Persian: باورس) (Note: Also romanized as Bāvers; also known as Yāvers) is a village in Hesar Kharvan Rural District of Mohammadiyeh District in Alborz County, Qazvin province, Iran.

== Demographics ==
=== Population ===
At the time of the 2006 National Census, the village's population was 1,858 in 465 households. The following census in 2011 counted 2,190 people in 620 households. The 2016 census measured the population of the village as 2,147 people in 696 households.
