= Hileh Rud =

Village in Qazvin province, Iran

Hileh Rud Persian: حيله رود
- Village
- Location within Iran
- Coordinates: 36°19′59″N 50°24′21″E
- Country: Iran
- Province: Qazvin
- County: Alborz
- District: Mohammadiyeh
- Rural District: Hesar Kharvan

Population (2016)
  - Total: 329
- Time zone: UTC+3:30 (IRST)

Hileh Rud (Persian: حيله رود) (Note: Also romanized as Ḩīleh Rūd) is a village in Hesar Kharvan Rural District of Mohammadiyeh District in Alborz County, Qazvin province, Iran.

== Demographics ==
=== Population ===
At the time of the 2006 National Census, the village's population was 72 in 26 households, when it was in Kuhpayeh-e Gharbi Rural District of the Central District in Abyek County. The following census in 2011 counted 32 people in 12 households, by which time it had been transferred to Hesar Kharvan Rural District of Mohammadiyeh District in Alborz County. The 2016 census measured the population of the village as 329 people in 110 households.
