= Qez Qaleh-ye Bozorg =

Qez Qaleh-ye Bozorg قزقلعه بزرگ
- Village
- Location within Iran
- Coordinates: 36°17′47″N 50°18′12″E
- Country: Iran
- Province: Qazvin
- County: Alborz
- Bakhsh: Mohammadiyeh
- Rural District: Hesar Kharvan

Population (2006)
  - Total: 34
- Time zone: UTC+3:30 (IRST)
  - Summer (DST): UTC+4:30 (IRDT)

Qez Qaleh-ye Bozorg (Persian: قزقلعه بزرگ, also Romanized as Qez Qal‘eh-ye Bozorg; also known as Qez Qal‘eh) is a village in Hesar Kharvan Rural District, Mohammadiyeh District, Alborz County, Qazvin Province, Iran. At the 2006 census, its population was 34, in 14 families.
