= Hesar Kharvan =

Village in Qazvin province, Iran

Hesar Khorvan Persian: حصار خروان
- Village
- Location within Iran
- Coordinates: 36°12′30″N 50°13′19″E
- Country: Iran
- Province: Qazvin
- County: Alborz
- District: Mohammadiyeh
- Rural District: Hesar Khorvan

Population (2016)
  - Total: 3,949
- Time zone: UTC+3:30 (IRST)
- Website: www.hw.sub.ir

Hesar Khorvan (Persian: حصارخروان) (Note: Also romanized as Hesar Khorvan, Ḩeşār Khorvān, and Hesār Khorvān) is a village in, and the capital of, Hesar Kharvan Rural District of Mohammadiyeh District, Alborz County, Qazvin province, Iran. People of Hesar Khorvan are Tat and they speak Tati language.

== Demographics ==
=== Population ===
At the time of the 2006 National Census, the village's population was 4,342 in 1,156 households. The following census in 2011 counted 4,036 people in 1,245 households. The 2016 census measured the population of the village as 3,949 people in 1,318 households. It was the most populous village in its rural district.
