= Shotorak Makhurin =

Village in Qazvin province, Iran

Shotorak Makhurin Persian: شترک ماخورين
- Village
- Location within Iran
- Coordinates: 36°15′53″N 50°12′35″E
- Country: Iran
- Province: Qazvin
- County: Alborz
- District: Mohammadiyeh
- Rural District: Hesar Kharvan

Population (2016)
  - Total: 1,578
- Time zone: UTC+3:30 (IRST)

Shotorak Makhurin (Persian: شترک ماخورين) is a village in Hesar Kharvan Rural District of Mohammadiyeh District in Alborz County, Qazvin province, Iran.

== Demographics ==
=== Population ===
At the time of the 2006 National Census, the village's population was 1,071 in 269 households. The following census in 2011 counted 1,258 people in 377 households. The 2016 census measured the population of the village as 1,578 people in 493 households.
