= Dizaj, Qazvin =

Village in Qazvin province, Iran

Dizaj Persian: ديزج
- Village
- Location within Iran
- Coordinates: 36°14′09″N 50°05′11″E
- Country: Iran
- Province: Qazvin
- County: Alborz
- District: Mohammadiyeh
- Rural District: Sharifabad

Population (2016)
  - Total: 234
- Time zone: UTC+3:30 (IRST)

Dizaj (Persian: ديزج) (Note: Also romanized as Dīzaj) is a village in Sharifabad Rural District of Mohammadiyeh District in Alborz County, Qazvin province, Iran.

== Demographics ==
=== Population ===
At the time of the 2006 National Census, the village's population was 311 in 86 households. The following census in 2011 counted 212 people in 67 households. The 2016 census measured the population of the village as 234 people in 82 households. It was the most populous village in its rural district.
