= Valamedar =

Village in Qazvin province, Iran

Valamedar Persian: ولامدر
- Village
- Location within Iran
- Coordinates: 36°14′34″N 50°14′46″E
- Country: Iran
- Province: Qazvin
- County: Alborz
- District: Mohammadiyeh
- Rural District: Hesar Kharvan

Population (2016)
  - Total: 223
- Time zone: UTC+3:30 (IRST)

Valamedar (Persian: ولامدر) (Note: Also romanized as Valāmedar) is a village in Hesar Kharvan Rural District of Mohammadiyeh District in Alborz County, Qazvin province, Iran.

== Demographics ==
=== Population ===
At the time of the 2006 National Census, the village's population was 144 in 43 households. The following census in 2011 counted 150 people in 47 households. The 2016 census measured the population of the village as 223 people in 69 households.
