= Chaleh, Qazvin =

Village in Qazvin province, Iran

Chaleh Persian: چاله
- Village
- Location within Iran
- Coordinates: 36°22′04″N 50°22′19″E
- Country: Iran
- Province: Qazvin
- County: Alborz
- District: Mohammadiyeh
- Rural District: Hesar Kharvan

Population (2016)
  - Total: 237
- Time zone: UTC+3:30 (IRST)

Chaleh (Persian: چاله) (Note: Also romanized as Chāleh; also known as Chāla) is a village in Hesar Kharvan Rural District of Mohammadiyeh District in Alborz County, Qazvin province, Iran.

== Demographics ==
=== Population ===
At the time of the 2006 National Census, the village's population was 208 in 66 households, when it was in Alamut-e Bala Rural District of Rudbar-e Alamut District (Note: Renamed Rudbar-e Alamut-e Sharqi District) in Qazvin County. The following census in 2011 counted 91 people in 36 households, by which time it had been transferred to Hesar Kharvan Rural District of Mohammadiyeh District in Alborz County. The 2016 census measured the population of the village as 237 people in 80 households.

== Notable people ==
Iranian Cleric Abdul Karim Abidini is from here.
