= Qez Qaleh =

Qez Qaleh (Persian: قزقلعه) may refer to:

== Castles ==
- Qez Qaleh Si, Abadeh, a castle in Abadeh County, Iran
- Qez Qaleh Si, Bileh Savar, a castle in Bileh Savar County, Iran

== Inhabited places in Iran ==
- Qez Qaleh, Markazi
- Qez Qaleh, Qazvin
- Qez Qaleh, Khoy, West Azerbaijan Province
- Qez Qaleh, Miandoab, West Azerbaijan Province
- Qez Qaleh, Showt, West Azerbaijan Province
