= Kuchar Castle =

Castle in Qazvin Province, Iran

Kuchar castle
- قلعه کوچار

General information
- Type: Castle
- Location: Alborz County, Iran

Kuchar castle (Persian: قلعه کوچار) is a historical castle located in Alborz County in Qazvin Province, The longevity of this fortress dates back to the Historical periods after Islam.
