= Varas, Iran =

Village in Qazvin province, Iran

Varas Persian: ورس
- Village
- Location within Iran
- Coordinates: 36°18′10″N 50°16′42″E
- Country: Iran
- Province: Qazvin
- County: Alborz
- District: Mohammadiyeh
- Rural District: Hesar Kharvan

Population (2016)
  - Total: 677
- Time zone: UTC+3:30 (IRST)

Varas (Persian: ورس) is a village in Hesar Kharvan Rural District. of Mohammadiyeh District in Alborz County, Qazvin province, Iran.

== Demographics ==
=== Population ===
At the time of the 2006 National Census, the village's population was 786 in 214 households. The following census in 2011 counted 585 people in 204 households. The 2016 census measured the population of the village as 677 people in 243 households.
