= Varas =

Varas may refer to:

== Places ==
- Varas, Afghanistan
- Waras District, a district in Bamyan Province, Afghanistan
- Varas, Argentina
- Varas, Brazil
- Varas, Iran
- Varas, Mazandaran, Iran
- Varas, Turkey
- Las Varas, Chihuahua, Mexico
- Vacas, Coahuila, Mexico
- Varashát, Hungary

== Units of measure ==
- Vara, a rarely used Spanish and Portuguese unit of length
  - Portuguese customary units
  - Spanish customary units

== People ==
- Antonio Varas
- Alex Varas
- Javi Varas
- José Miguel Varas

== Title ==
- Varas may refer to title or position of Wazir
