= Mehregan, Qazvin =

City in Qazvin province, Iran

Mehregan Persian: مهرگان
- City
- Location within Iran
- Coordinates: 36°15′02″N 50°10′59″E
- Country: Iran
- Province: Qazvin
- County: Alborz
- District: Mohammadiyeh
- Established: 2022
- Elevation: 1,340 to 1,390 m (4,400 to 4,560 ft)
- Time zone: UTC+3:30 (IRST)

Mehregan (Persian: مهرگان) is a city in Mohammadiyeh District of Alborz County, Qazvin province, Iran.

In March 2022, the governor of Qazvin province announced that the Supreme Council of Architecture and Urban Planning of Iran had decided in favor of converting Mehregan into a city for reasons of economic development. The shrimp-breeding site in Mehregan would be transferred to the Shahid Foundation and there would be a halt in steel industry establishments. The population of the city is expected to grow from 60,000 to 100,000 by 2027.

In August 2022, the director general of the province's Transport and Urban Development Department indicated that 65 hectares (160 acres) are allotted for over 45,000 residential units, and 350 hectares (860 acres) for government institutions and qualified companies.
