= Sharifabad Rural District (Alborz County) =

Rural district in Qazvin province, Iran

Sharifabad Rural District Persian: دهستان شريف آباد
- Rural District
- Location within Iran
- Coordinates: 36°12′N 50°08′E
- Country: Iran
- Province: Qazvin
- County: Alborz
- District: Mohammadiyeh
- Established: 1991
- Capital: Sharifabad

Population (2016)
  - Total: 321
- Time zone: UTC+3:30 (IRST)

Sharifabad Rural District (Persian: دهستان شريف آباد) is in Mohammadiyeh District of Alborz County, Qazvin province, Iran. It is administered from the city of Sharifabad.

== Demographics ==
=== Population ===
At the time of the 2006 National Census, the rural district's population was 16,988 in 4,367 households. There were 303 inhabitants in 91 households at the following census of 2011. The 2016 census measured the population of the rural district as 321 in 109 households. The most populous of its two villages was Dizaj, with 234 people.

=== Other villages in the rural district ===
- Sharifabad Agriculture and Industry Organization
