= Mohammadiyeh =

City in Qazvin province, Iran

Mohammadiyeh Persian: محمديه
- City
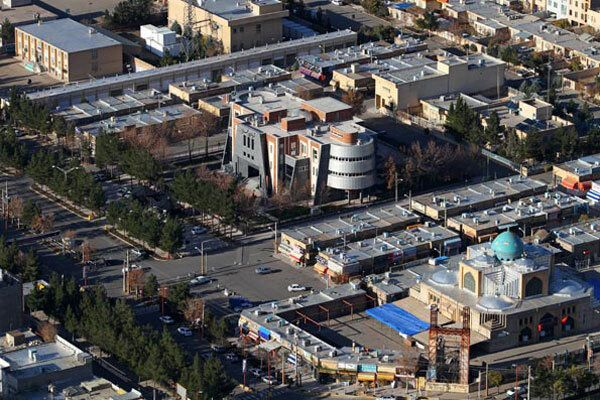
- Aerial view of Mohammadiyeh

- Location within Iran
- Coordinates: 36°13′26″N 50°10′58″E
- Country: Iran
- Province: Qazvin
- County: Alborz
- District: Mohammadiyeh
- Established as a city: 1995

Population (2016)
  - Total: 90,513
- Time zone: UTC+3:30 (IRST)

Mohammadiyeh (Persian: محمديه) (Note: Also romanized as Moḩammadīyeh; formerly the village of Zibashahr) is a city in, and the capital of, Mohammadiyeh District in Alborz County, Qazvin province, Iran.

== Demographics ==
=== Population ===
At the time of the 2006 National Census, the city's population was 41,766 in 10,904 households. The following census in 2011 counted 48,862 people in 14,527 households. The 2016 census measured the population of the city as 90,513 people in 28,923 households.

== See also ==
Media related to Mohammadiyeh at Wikimedia Commons
