= Sharifabad, Alborz =

City in Qazvin province, Iran

Sharifabad Persian: شریف آباد
- City
- Location within Iran
- Coordinates: 36°12′42″N 50°09′01″E
- Country: Iran
- Province: Qazvin
- County: Alborz
- District: Mohammadiyeh
- Established: 2007

Population (2016)
  - Total: 20,347
- Time zone: UTC+3:30 (IRST)

Sharifabad (Persian: شریف آباد) (Note: Also romanized as Sharīfābād; formerly Sharifiyeh (شريفيه)) is a city in Mohammadiyeh District of Alborz County, Qazvin province, Iran, serving as the administrative center for Sharifabad Rural District.

== Demographics ==
=== Population ===
At the time of the 2006 National Census, Sharifabad's population was 16,551 in 4,248 households, when it was a village in Sharifabad Rural District. The following census in 2011 counted 21,009 people in 6,112 households, by which time the village had been converted to the city of Sharifiyeh. The 2016 census measured the population of the city as 20,347 people in 6,074 households.

In 2023, the name of city was changed back to Sharifabad.
