= Hesar Kharvan Rural District =

Rural district in Qazvin province, Iran

Hesar Kharvan Rural District Persian: دهستان حصار خروان
- Rural District
- Location within Iran
- Coordinates: 36°15′N 50°14′E
- Country: Iran
- Province: Qazvin
- County: Alborz
- District: Mohammadiyeh
- Established: 2005
- Capital: Hesar Kharvan

Population (2016)
  - Total: 9,662
- Time zone: UTC+3:30 (IRST)

Hesar Kharvan Rural District (Persian: دهستان حصار خروان) is in Mohammadiyeh District of Alborz County, Qazvin province, Iran. Its capital is the village of Hesar Kharvan.

== Demographics ==
=== Population ===
At the time of the 2006 National Census, the rural district's population was 8,329 in 2,194 households. There were 8,488 inhabitants in 2,606 households at the following census of 2011. The 2016 census measured the population of the rural district as 9,662 in 3,211 households. The most populous of its 11 villages was Hesar Kharvan, with 3,949 people.

=== Other villages in the rural district ===
- Bavers
- Chaleh
- Hileh Rud
- Shotorak Makhurin
- Valamedar
- Varas
