= Lujali =

City in North Khorasan province, Iran

Lujali Persian: لوجلي
- City
- Location within Iran
- Coordinates: 37°36′22″N 57°51′26″E
- Country: Iran
- Province: North Khorasan
- County: Shirvan
- District: Sarhad

Population (2016)
  - Total: 1,481
- Time zone: UTC+3:30 (IRST)

Lujali (Persian: لوجلي) (Note: Also romanized as Loojli, Lowjallī, Lūjalī, Lūjallī, and Lūjlī; also known as Lojanlī and Lūjānlī) is a city in, and the capital of, Sarhad District in Shirvan County, North Khorasan province, Iran.

== Demographics ==
=== Ethnicity ===
Residents of the city are Kurds.

=== Population ===
At the time of the 2006 National Census, the city's population was 701 in 174 households. The following census in 2011 counted 1,166 people in 217 households. The 2016 census measured the population of the city as 1,481 people in 368 households.
