= Bidestan =

City in Qazvin province, Iran

Bidestan Persian: بيدستان
- City
- Location within Iran
- Coordinates: 36°13′51″N 50°07′25″E
- Country: Iran
- Province: Qazvin
- County: Alborz
- District: Mohammadiyeh
- Established as a city: 2002

Population (2016)
  - Total: 18,060
- Time zone: UTC+3:30 (IRST)

Bidestan (Persian: بيدستان) (Note: Also romanized as Bīdestān) is a city in Mohammadiyeh District of Alborz County, Qazvin province, Iran. The village of Bidestan was converted to a city in 2002.

== Demographics ==
=== Population ===
At the time of the 2006 National Census, the city's population was 20,110 in 5,263 households. The following census in 2011 counted 19,996 people in 5,716 households. The 2016 census measured the population of the city as 18,060 people in 5,581 households.
