= Qiz Qaleh =

Qiz Qaleh قيزقلعه
- Village
- Location within Iran
- Coordinates: 34°53′39″N 50°13′33″E
- Country: Iran
- Province: Markazi
- County: Saveh
- Bakhsh: Central
- Rural District: Nur Ali Beyk

Population (2006)
  - Total: 23
- Time zone: UTC+3:30 (IRST)
  - Summer (DST): UTC+4:30 (IRDT)

Qiz Qaleh (Persian: قيزقلعه, also Romanized as Qiz Qal‘eh; also known as Qez Qal‘eh and Qez Qal‘eh-ye Kharābeh) is a village in Nur Ali Beyk Rural District, in the Central District of Saveh County, Markazi Province, Iran. At the 2006 census, its population was 23, in 5 families.
