= Mohammadiyeh District =

District in Qazvin province, Iran

Mohammadiyeh District Persian: بخش محمدیه
- District
- Location within Iran
- Coordinates: 36°15′N 50°14′E
- Country: Iran
- Province: Qazvin
- County: Alborz
- Established: 2005
- Capital: Mohammadiyeh

Population (2016)
  - Total: 138,903
- Time zone: UTC+3:30 (IRST)

Mohammadiyeh District (Persian: بخش محمدیه) is in Alborz County, Qazvin province, Iran. Its capital is the city of Mohammadiyeh.

== History ==
The village of Sharifabad was converted to the city of Sharifiyeh in 2007. (Note: The name of the city was changed back to Sharifabad in 2023) Mehregan rose to city status in 2022.

== Demographics ==
=== Population ===
At the time of the 2006 National Census, the district's population was 87,193 in 22,728 households. The following census in 2011 counted 98,658 people in 29,052 households. The 2016 census measured the population of the district as 43,898 households.

=== Administrative divisions ===
Mohammadiyeh District Population
| Administrative Divisions | 2006 | 2011 | 2016 |
|---|---|---|---|
| Hesar Kharvan RD | 8,329 | 8,488 | 9,662 |
| Sharifabad RD | 16,988 | 303 | 321 |
| Bidestan (city) | 20,110 | 19,996 | 18,060 |
| Mehregan (city) (Note: Became a city after the 2016 census) | | | |
| Mohammadiyeh (city) | 41,766 | 48,862 | 90,513 |
| Sharifabad (city) (Note: Formerly Sharifiyeh) | | 21,009 | 20,347 |
| Total | 87,193 | 98,658 | 138,903 |
RD = Rural District
