= Alborz County =

County in Qazvin province, Iran

Alborz County Persian: شهرستان البرز
- County
- Location of Alborz County in Qazvin province (right, purple)

- Location of Qazvin province in Iran
- Coordinates: 36°13′N 50°09′E
- Country: Iran
- Province: Qazvin
- Established: 2005
- Capital: Alvand
- Districts: Central, Mohammadiyeh

Population (2016)
  - Total: 242,865
- Time zone: UTC+3:30 (IRST)

Alborz County (Persian: شهرستان البرز) is in Qazvin province, Iran. Its capital is the city of Alvand.

== History ==
The village of Sharifabad was converted to the city of Sharifiyeh in 2007. (Note: The name of the city was changed back to Sharifabad in 2023.) Mehregan rose to city status in 2022.

== Demographics ==
=== Population ===
At the time of the 2006 National Census, the county's population was 182,046 in 47,046 households. The following census in 2011 counted 203,276 people in 59,174 households. The 2016 census measured the population of the county as 242,865 in 75,922 households.

=== Administrative divisions ===
Alborz County's population history and administrative structure over three consecutive censuses are shown in the following table.

Alborz County Population
Administrative Divisions	2006	2011	2016
Central District	94,853	104,618	103,962
Nosratabad RD	16,093	5,919	5,805
Pir Yusefian RD	9,427	9,988	4,321
Alvand (city)	69,333	88,711	93,836
Mohammadiyeh District	87,193	98,658	138,903
Hesar Kharvan RD	8,329	8,488	9,662
Sharifabad RD	16,988	303	321
Bidestan (city)	20,110	19,996	18,060
Mehregan (city) (Note: Became a city after the 2016 census)			
Mohammadiyeh (city)	41,766	48,862	90,513
Sharifabad (city) (Note: Formerly Sharifiyeh)		21,009	20,347
Total	182,046	203,276	242,865
RD = Rural District

== See also ==
Media related to Alborz County at Wikimedia Commons
