= Seyfabad =

Seyfabad (Persian: سيف اباد) may refer to:

== Alborz Province ==
- Golsar, Savojbolagh, a city in Alborz Province, Iran
- Seyfabad-e Bozorg, a former village in Alborz Province, Iran
- Seyfabad-e Khaleseh, a former village in Alborz Province, Iran

== Ardabil Province ==
- Seyfabad, Ardabil, a village in Namin County

== Chaharmahal and Bakhtiari Province ==
- Seyfabad, Borujen, a village in Borujen County
- Seyfabad, Kuhrang, a village in Kuhrang County
- Seyfabad-e Allah Yar, a village in Kuhrang County

== Fars Province ==
- Seyfabad, Eqlid, a village in Eqlid County
- Seyfabad, Kazerun, a village in Kazerun County
- Seyfabad, Khonj, a village in Khonj County
- Seyfabad Rural District, in Khonj County
- Seyfabad, Sarvestan, a village in Sarvestan County

== Hamadan Province ==
- Seyfabad, Hamadan, a village in Asadabad County

== Hormozgan Province ==
- Seyfabad, Hormozgan, a village in Hajjiabad County

== Isfahan Province ==
- Seyfabad, Kashan, a village in Kashan County
- Seyfabad, Isfahan, a village in Nain County

== Kerman Province ==
- Seyfabad, Jiroft, a village in Jiroft County
- Seyfabad-e Muqufeh, a village in Jiroft County
- Seyfabad, Narmashir, a village in Narmashir County

== Khuzestan Province ==
- Seyfabad, Dezful, a village in Dezful County
- Seyfabad, Masjed Soleyman, a village in Masjed Soleyman County

== Kurdistan Province ==
- Seyfabad, Bijar, a village in Bijar County
- Seyfabad, Kamyaran, a village in Kamyaran County
- Seyfabad, Saqqez, a village in Saqqez County

== Lorestan Province ==
- Seyfabad, Khorramabad, a village in Khorramabad County
- Seyfabad, Selseleh, a village in Selseleh County

== Markazi Province ==
- Seyfabad, Markazi, a village in Saveh County

== Qazvin Province ==
- Seyfabad, Qazvin, a village in Takestan County

== Qom Province ==
- Seyfabad, Qom, a village in Qom Province, Iran

== Razavi Khorasan Province ==
- Seyfabad, Bardaskan, a village in Bardaskan County
- Seyfabad, Nishapur, a village in Nishapur County

== Yazd Province ==
- Seyfabad, Yazd, a village in Khatam County

== Zanjan Province ==
- Seyfabad, Zanjan, a village in Zanjan County
