= Karkhaneh-e Fakhr-e Iran =

Village in Alborz province, Iran

Karkhaneh-e Fakhr-e Iran Persian: كارخانه فخر ايران
- Village
- Location within Iran
- Country: Iran
- Province: Alborz
- County: Nazarabad
- District: Central
- Rural District: Jamal ol Din

Population (2016)
  - Total: 1,162
- Time zone: UTC+3:30 (IRST)

Karkhaneh-e Fakhr-e Iran (Persian: كارخانه فخر ايران) (Note: Also romanized as Kārkhāneh-e Fakhr-e Īrān; also known as Kārkhānejāt-e Fakhr-e Īrān) is a village in Jamal ol Din Rural District of the Central District in Nazarabad County, Alborz province, Iran.

== Demographics ==
=== Population ===
At the time of the 2006 National Census, the village's population was 849 in 220 households, when it was in Tankaman Rural District (Note: Renamed Tankaman-e Jonubi Rural District) of Tankaman District in Tehran province. In 2008, the village was transferred to Jamal ol Din Rural District created in the Central District. In 2010, the county was separated from the province in the establishment of Alborz province. The 2016 census measured the population of the village as 1,162 people in 365 households. It was the most populous village in its rural district.
