= Najmabad, Alborz =

Village in Alborz province, Iran

Najmabad Persian: نجم اباد
- Village
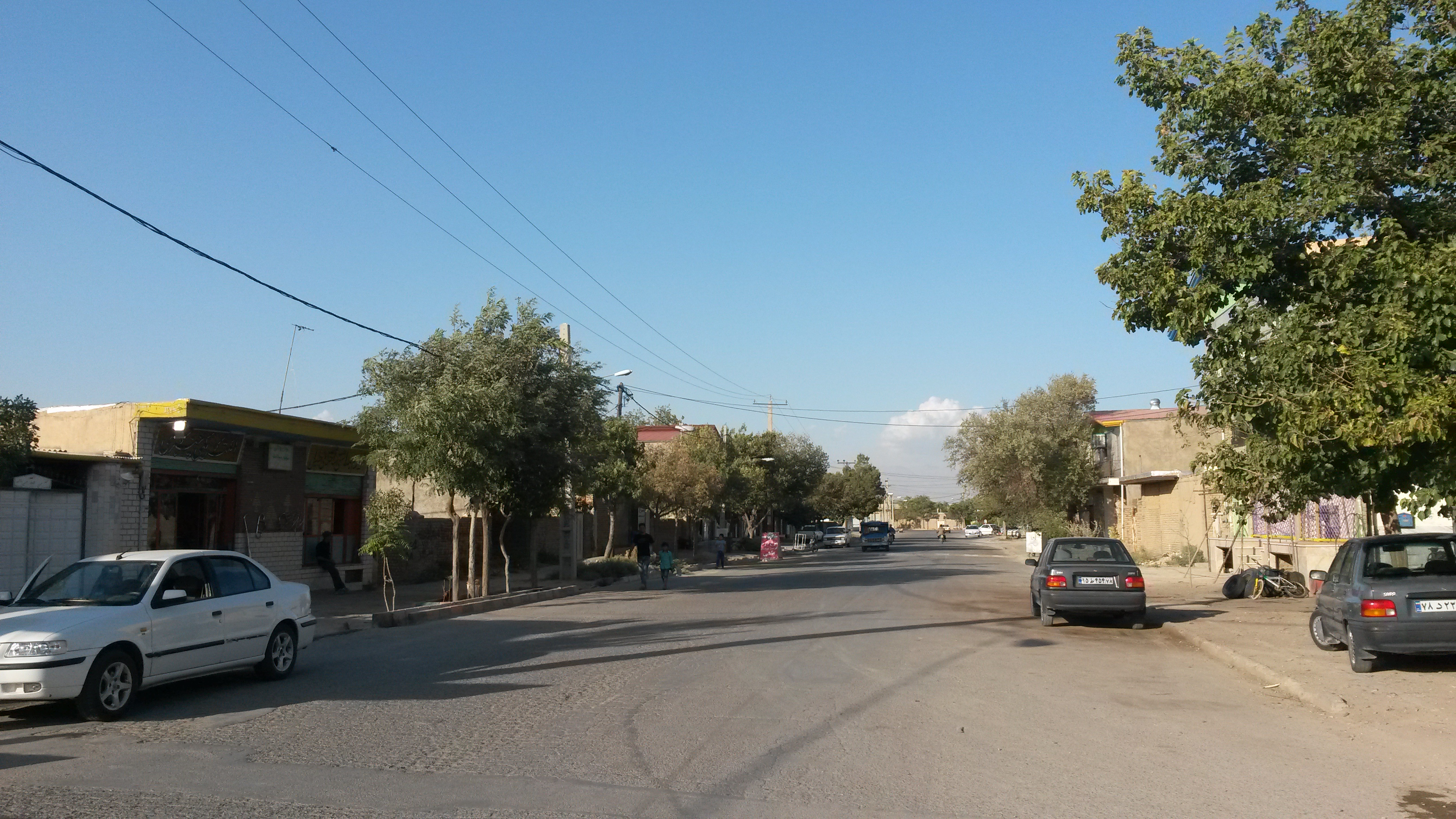

- Location within Iran
- Coordinates: 35°50′49″N 50°30′20″E
- Country: Iran
- Province: Alborz
- County: Nazarabad
- District: Central
- Rural District: Najmabad

Population (2016)
  - Total: 3,943
- Time zone: UTC+3:30 (IRST)
- Area code: 0098 26

Najmabad (Persian: نجم اباد) (Note: Also romanized as Najmābād) is a village in, and the capital of, Najmabad Rural District in the Central District of Nazarabad County, Alborz province, Iran.

== Demographics ==
=== Population ===
At the time of the 2006 National Census, the village's population was 3,932 in 939 households, when it was in Tankaman District of Tehran province. The rural district was separated from the district to join the Central District in 2007. In 2010, the county was separated from the province in the establishment of Alborz province. The 2016 census measured the population of the village as 3,943 people in 1,171 households.

== Geography ==
=== Location ===
Najmabad is in the southwest of Nazarabad County, from the north to Nazarabad, from the south to the city of Eshtehard, from the west to Qazvin Plain, and it is delimited by Tankaman District on the east. The village of Najmabad, with an age of 1500 years, is located at a distance of 108 km from Tehran and 56 km from Karaj.

=== Climate ===
The climate of the village is relatively moderate and at the same time a hot and dry desert, and the reason for this is the existence of valley ring mountains in the south and being in the semi-desert area.

== Agriculture ==
Most of the people of Najmabad are engaged in agriculture and livestock because of the arable land and abundant water. Najmabad village with 18 farms and 4200 hectares has suitable soil for agriculture. This region is well known for grapes and watermelons.

== Tourism ==
Imamzadeh chehel dokhtar: This shrine is located four kilometers east of Najmabad village in a flat area and in the plain. This mausoleum is a single building, without garlands and has a public cemetery. The construction date of this old building reaches the 8th century AH, although many parts of it have been restored and renovated over time, and these repairs continued until the 12th century AH. This imamzadeh is considered one of the valuable historical and cultural tombs of Nazarabad city and attracts a large number of pilgrims daily.

Seasonal River: This river flows in the south of the village, which originates from the Kurdan mountains, and after traveling a distance near the city of eshtehard, it merges with Shour River and Finally, it is poured into namak Lake.

Najmabad Desert: The pristine and beautiful area is located in the southwest of Nazarabad and northeast of Buin Zahra. It is a desert that is about 30 km wide and 30 km long, and in spring it turns into a swamp full of water, and in summer it is considered a semi-desert region, and there are also many seasonal rivers in this The desert is flowing. This desert area has been declared a protected area by Environment because of the existence of animals such as Gazelle, snake.

Namaki cave: A multi-million-year-old salt cave is located in the south of Najmabad, in a completely erosive and desert environment. The cave is about 350 meters long and has 3 entrances. Inside the halls of the salt rivers, and huge salt megadomes cave, there are salt lamps. At the beginning of the cave entrance, there is a salt flow that enters from one side and exits from the other.

Wetland: The existence of a very large lake that forms seasonally next to the entrance of Gharnamaki and among the heights of the valley ring and is the habitat of various animal and plant species, adds to the tourism attractions of the region.

Colored mountains, ancient hill, natural glacier, old structure of the seminary, stone house, beautiful watermelon fields, many herds of camel (one and two humps) are among other tourist attractions of Najmabad village.

== In literature ==
The 14th-century author Hamdallah Mustawfi listed Najmabad as one of the main villages in the district of Sāvojbolāgh.
