= Abdolabad, Alborz =

Village in Alborz province, Iran

Abdolabad Persian: عبدل‌آباد
- Village
- Location within Iran
- Coordinates: 35°50′48″N 50°33′28″E
- Country: Iran
- Province: Alborz
- County: Nazarabad
- District: Tankaman
- Rural District: Tankaman-e Jonubi

Population (2016)
  - Total: 170
- Time zone: UTC+3:30 (IRST)

Abdolabad (Persian: عبدل‌آباد) (Note: Also romanized as ‘Abdolābād) is a village in Tankaman-e Jonubi Rural District (Note: Formerly Tankaman Rural District) of Tankaman District in Nazarabad County, Alborz province, Iran.

== Demographics ==
=== Population ===
At the time of the 2006 National Census, the village's population was 126 in 31 households, when it was in Najmabad Rural District of Tehran province. The rural district was transferred to the Central District, and the village was transferred to Tankaman-e Jonubi Rural District in 2007. In 2010, the county was separated from the province in the establishment of Alborz province. The 2016 census measured the population of the village as 170 people in 56 households.
