= Ali Seyyed =

Village in Alborz province, Iran

Ali Seyyed Persian: علي سعيد
- Village
- Location within Iran
- Coordinates: 35°51′20″N 50°36′21″E
- Country: Iran
- Province: Alborz
- County: Nazarabad
- District: Tankaman
- Rural District: Tankaman-e Jonubi

Population (2016)
  - Total: 455
- Time zone: UTC+3:30 (IRST)

Ali Seyyed (Persian: علي سعيد) (Note: Also romanized as Ali Saeid and ‘Alī Saeid) is a village in Tankaman-e Jonubi Rural District (Note: Formerly Tankaman Rural District) of Tankaman District in Nazarabad County, Alborz province, Iran.

== Demographics ==
=== Population ===
At the time of the 2006 National Census, the village's population was 264 in 68 households, when it was in Najmabad Rural District of Tehran province. The rural district was transferred to the Central District, and the village was transferred to Tankaman-e Jonubi Rural District in 2007. In 2010, the county was separated from the province in the establishment of Alborz province. The 2016 census measured the population of the village as 455 people in 147 households.
