= Hoseynabad, Alborz =

Village in Alborz province, Iran

Hoseynabad Persian: حسين اباد
- Village
- Location within Iran
- Coordinates: 35°51′31″N 50°39′03″E
- Country: Iran
- Province: Alborz
- County: Savojbolagh
- District: Central
- Rural District: Saidabad

Population (2016)
  - Total: 381
- Time zone: UTC+3:30 (IRST)

Hoseynabad (Persian: حسين اباد) (Note: Also romanized as Ḩoseynābād) is a village in Saidabad Rural District of the Central District in Savojbolagh County, Alborz province, Iran.

== Demographics ==
=== Population ===
At the time of the 2006 National Census, the village's population was 261 in 60 households, when it was in Tankaman Rural District (Note: Renamed Tankaman-e Jonubi Rural District) of Tankaman District in Nazarabad County, Tehran province. The 2016 census measured the population of the village as 381 people in 112 households, by which time the county had been separated from the province in the establishment of Alborz province. Hoseynabad had been transferred back to Saidabad Rural District of the Central District in Savojbolagh County.
