= Vayeh Beyk =

Village in Alborz province, Iran

Vayeh Beyk Persian: وايه بك
- Village
- Location within Iran
- Coordinates: 35°54′46″N 50°33′41″E
- Country: Iran
- Province: Alborz
- County: Nazarabad
- District: Central
- Rural District: Najmabad

Population (2016)
  - Total: 146
- Time zone: UTC+3:30 (IRST)

Vayeh Beyk (Persian: وايه بك) (Note: Also romanized as Vāyeh Beyg or Vāyeh Beyk; also known as Vāybek) is a village in Najmabad Rural District of the Central District in Nazarabad County, Alborz province, Iran.

== Demographics ==
=== Population ===
At the time of the 2006 National Census, the village's population was 153 in 38 households, when it was in Tankaman District of Tehran province. The rural district was separated from the district to join the Central District in 2007. In 2010, the county was separated from the province in the establishment of Alborz province. The 2016 census measured the population of the village as 146 people in 44 households.
