= Qarah Qobad, Alborz =

Village in Alborz province, Iran

Qarah Qobad Persian: قره قباد
- Village
- Location within Iran
- Coordinates: 35°52′37″N 50°39′02″E
- Country: Iran
- Province: Alborz
- County: Savojbolagh
- District: Central
- Rural District: Saidabad

Population (2016)
  - Total: 245
- Time zone: UTC+3:30 (IRST)

Qarah Qobad (Persian: قره قباد) (Note: Also romanized as Qarah Qobād and Qerah Qobād) is a village in Saidabad Rural District of the Central District in Savojbolagh County, Alborz province, Iran.

== Demographics ==
=== Population ===
At the time of the 2006 National Census, the village's population was 157 in 40 households, when it was in Tankaman Rural District (Note: Renamed Tankaman-e Jonubi Rural District) of Tankaman District in Nazarabad County, Tehran province. The 2016 census measured the population of the village as 245 people in 80 households, by which time the county had been separated from the province in the establishment of Alborz province. Qarah Qobad had been transferred back to Saidabad Rural District of the Central District in Savojbolagh County.
