= Yengi Emam =

Neighborhood in Alborz province, Iran

Yengi Emam Persian: ینگی امام
- Neighborhood
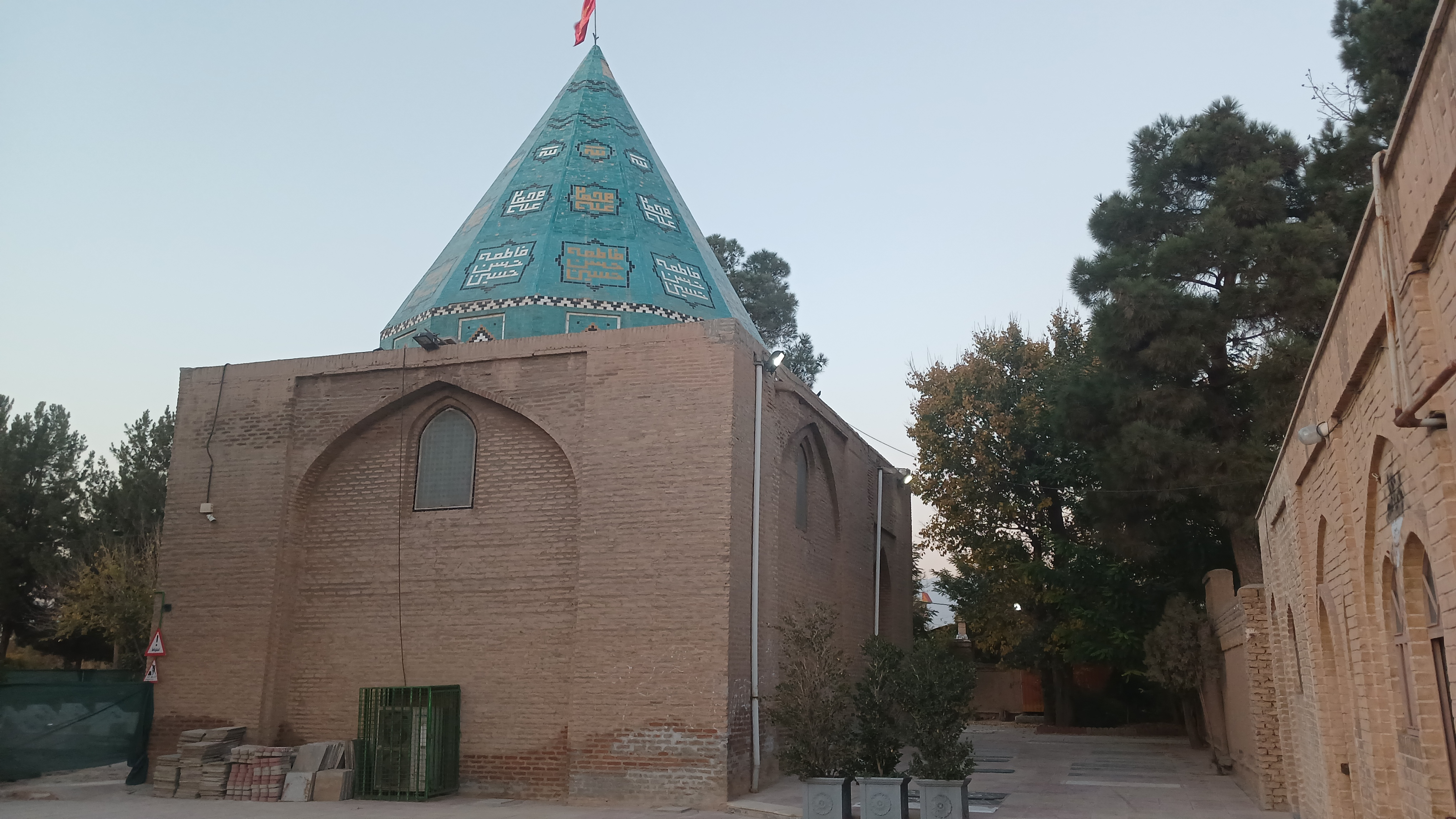
- Yengi Emam

- Location within Iran
- Coordinates: 35°56′21″N 50°43′20″E
- Country: Iran
- Province: Alborz
- County: Savojbolagh
- District: Central
- City: Hashtgerd

Population (2016)
  - Total: 4,999
- Time zone: UTC+3:30 (IRST)

Yengi Emam (Persian: ینگی امام) (Note: Also romanized as Yangī Emām, Yangi Imām, and Yengī Emām) is a neighborhood in the city of Hashtgerd in the Central District of Savojbolagh County, Alborz province, Iran.

== Demographics ==
=== Population ===
At the time of the 2006 National Census, Yengi Emam's population was 5,234 in 1,375 households, when it was a village in Saidabad Rural District of Tehran province. The 2016 census measured the population of the village as 4,999 people in 1,515 households, by which time the county had been separated from the province in the establishment of Alborz province.

After the census, the village was annexed by the city of Hashtgerd.

== See also ==
- Yengi Emam Caravansari
