= Khorramabad, Alborz =

Village in Alborz province, Iran

Khorramabad Persian: خرم اباد
- Village
- Location within Iran
- Coordinates: 35°53′55″N 50°31′51″E
- Country: Iran
- Province: Alborz
- County: Nazarabad
- District: Central
- Rural District: Najmabad

Population (2016)
  - Total: 215
- Time zone: UTC+3:30 (IRST)

Khorramabad (Persian: خرم اباد) (Note: Also romanized as Khorramābād) is a village in Najmabad Rural District of the Central District in Nazarabad County, Alborz province, Iran.

== Demographics ==
=== Population ===
At the time of the 2006 National Census, the village's population was 259 in 61 households, when it was in Tankaman District of Tehran province. The rural district was separated from the district to join the Central District in 2007. In 2010, the county was separated from the province in the establishment of Alborz province. The 2016 census measured the population of the village as 215 people in 68 households.
