= Qaleh-ye Azari, Alborz =

Village in Alborz province, Iran

Qaleh-ye Azari Persian: قلعه اذري
- Village
- Location within Iran
- Coordinates: 35°56′12″N 50°38′38″E
- Country: Iran
- Province: Alborz
- County: Nazarabad
- District: Tankaman
- Rural District: Tankaman-e Shomali

Population (2016)
  - Total: 389
- Time zone: UTC+3:30 (IRST)

Qaleh-ye Azari (Persian: قلعه اذري) (Note: Also romanized as Qal‘eh-ye Āz̄arī) is a village in Tankaman-e Shomali Rural District of Tankaman District in Nazarabad County, Alborz province, Iran.

== Demographics ==
=== Population ===
At the time of the 2006 National Census, the village's population was 522 in 141 households, when it was in Tankaman Rural District (Note: Renamed Tankaman-e Jonubi Rural District) of Tehran province. In 2007, the village was transferred to Tankaman-e Shomali Rural District created in the district. In 2010, the county was separated from the province in the establishment of Alborz province. The 2016 census measured the population of the village as 389 people in 139 households.
