= Mohammadabad-e Afkham ol Dowleh =

Village in Alborz province, Iran

Mohammadabad-e Afkham ol Dowleh Persian: محمدابادافخم الدوله
- Village
- Location within Iran
- Coordinates: 35°52′56″N 50°29′56″E
- Country: Iran
- Province: Alborz
- County: Nazarabad
- District: Central
- Rural District: Najmabad

Population (2016)
  - Total: 753
- Time zone: UTC+3:30 (IRST)

Mohammadabad-e Afkham ol Dowleh (Persian: محمدابادافخم الدوله) (Note: Also romanized as Moḩammadābād-e Āfkham ol Dowleh) is a village in Najmabad Rural District of the Central District in Nazarabad County, Alborz province, Iran.

== Demographics ==
=== Population ===
At the time of the 2006 National Census, the village's population was 856 in 201 households, when it was in Tankaman District of Tehran province. The rural district was separated from the district to join the Central District in 2007. In 2010, the county was separated from the province in the establishment of Alborz province. The 2016 census measured the population of the village as 753 people in 221 households.
