= Quch Hesar, Alborz =

Village in Alborz province, Iran

Quch Hesar Persian: قوچ حصار
- Village
- Location within Iran
- Coordinates: 35°56′40″N 50°34′43″E
- Country: Iran
- Province: Alborz
- County: Nazarabad
- District: Central
- Rural District: Najmabad

Population (2016)
  - Total: 109
- Time zone: UTC+3:30 (IRST)

Quch Hesar (Persian: قوچ حصار) is a village in Najmabad Rural District of the Central District in Nazarabad County, Alborz province, Iran.

== Demographics ==
=== Population ===
The village did not appear in the 2006 National Census, when it was in Tankaman District of Tehran province. The rural district was separated from the district to join the Central District in 2007. In 2010, the county was separated from the province in the establishment of Alborz province. The 2016 census measured the population of the village as 109 people in 31 households.
