= Qeshlaq-e Mohammadlu =

Village in Alborz province, Iran

Qeshlaq-e Mohammadlu Persian: قشلاق محمدلو
- Village
- Location within Iran
- Coordinates: 35°48′01″N 50°31′38″E
- Country: Iran
- Province: Alborz
- County: Nazarabad
- District: Central
- Rural District: Najmabad

Population (2016)
  - Total: 109
- Time zone: UTC+3:30 (IRST)

Qeshlaq-e Mohammadlu (Persian: قشلاق محمدلو) (Note: Also romanized as Qeshlāq-e Moḩammadlū; also known as Qeshlāq-e Moḩammad ‘Alī, Qeshlāq-e Moḩammadī, and Qishlāq Muhammad ‘Ali) is a village in Najmabad Rural District of the Central District in Nazarabad County, Alborz province, Iran.

== Demographics ==
=== Population ===
At the time of the 2006 National Census, the village's population was 71 in 15 households, when it was in Tankaman District of Tehran province. The rural district was separated from the district to join the Central District in 2007. In 2010, the county was separated from the province in the establishment of Alborz province. The 2016 census measured the population of the village as 109 people in 37 households.
