= Khosrowabad, Alborz =

Village in Alborz province, Iran

Khosrowabad Persian: خسرواباد
- Village
- Location within Iran
- Coordinates: 35°55′55″N 50°33′38″E
- Country: Iran
- Province: Alborz
- County: Nazarabad
- District: Central
- Rural District: Najmabad

Population (2016)
  - Total: 238
- Time zone: UTC+3:30 (IRST)

Khosrowabad (Persian: خسرواباد) (Note: Also romanized as Khosrowābād) is a village in Najmabad Rural District of the Central District in Nazarabad County, Alborz province, Iran.

== Demographics ==
=== Population ===
At the time of the 2006 National Census, the village's population was 131 in 35 households, when it was in Tankaman District of Tehran province. The rural district was separated from the district to join the Central District in 2007. In 2010, the county was separated from the province in the establishment of Alborz province. The 2016 census measured the population of the village as 238 people in 67 households.
