= Bakhtiar, Alborz =

Village in Alborz province, Iran

Bakhtiar Persian: بختيار
- Village
- Location within Iran
- Coordinates: 35°54′22″N 50°37′47″E
- Country: Iran
- Province: Alborz
- County: Nazarabad
- District: Tankaman
- Rural District: Tankaman-e Shomali

Population (2016)
  - Total: 3,520
- Time zone: UTC+3:30 (IRST)

Bakhtiar (Persian: بختيار) (Note: Also romanized as Bakhtīār and Bakhtyār) is a village in, and the capital of, Tankaman-e Shomali Rural District in Tankaman District of Nazarabad County, Alborz province, Iran.

== Demographics ==
=== Population ===
At the time of the 2006 National Census, the village's population was 3,064 in 753 households, when it was in Tankaman Rural District (Note: Renamed Tankaman-e Jonubi Rural District) of Tehran province. In 2007, the village was transferred to Tankaman-e Shomali Rural District created in the district. In 2010, the county was separated from the province in the establishment of Alborz province. The 2016 census measured the population of the village as 3,520 people in 1,055 households. Bakhtiar was the most populous village in its rural district.
