= Sheykh Hasan, Alborz =

Village in Alborz province, Iran

Sheykh Hasan Persian: شيخ حسن
- Village
- Location within Iran
- Coordinates: 35°54′15″N 50°32′54″E
- Country: Iran
- Province: Alborz
- County: Nazarabad
- District: Central
- Rural District: Najmabad

Population (2016)
  - Total: 899
- Time zone: UTC+3:30 (IRST)

Sheykh Hasan (Persian: شيخ حسن) (Note: Also romanized as Sheykh Ḩasan) is a village in Najmabad Rural District of the Central District in Nazarabad County, Alborz province, Iran.

== Demographics ==
=== Population ===
At the time of the 2006 National Census, the village's population was 873 in 220 households, when it was in Tankaman District of Tehran province. The rural district was separated from the district to join the Central District in 2007. In 2010, the county was separated from the province in the establishment of Alborz province. The 2016 census measured the population of the village as 899 people in 258 households. Sheykh Hasan was the most populous village in its rural district.
