= Gol Darreh, Alborz =

Village in Alborz province, Iran

Gol Darreh Persian: گل دره
- Village
- Country: Iran
- Province: Alborz
- County: Nazarabad
- District: Central
- Rural District: Najmabad

Population (2016)
  - Total: 66
- Time zone: UTC+3:30 (IRST)

Gol Darreh (Persian: گل دره) is a village in Najmabad Rural District of the Central District in Nazarabad County, Alborz province, Iran.

== Demographics ==
=== Population ===
At the time of the 2006 National Census, the village's population was 74 in 12 households, when it was in Tankaman District of Tehran province. The rural district was separated from the district to join the Central District in 2007. In 2010, the county was separated from the province in the establishment of Alborz province. The 2016 census measured the population of the village as 66 people in 20 households.
