= Hoseynabad, Jamal ol Din =

Village in Alborz province, Iran

Hoseynabad Persian: حسين آباد
- Village
- Location within Iran
- Coordinates: 35°55′49″N 50°37′00″E
- Country: Iran
- Province: Alborz
- County: Nazarabad
- District: Central
- Rural District: Jamal ol Din

Population (2016)
  - Total: 125
- Time zone: UTC+3:30 (IRST)

Hoseynabad (Persian: حسين آباد) is a village in Jamal ol Din Rural District of the Central District in Nazarabad County, Alborz province, Iran.

== Demographics ==
=== Population ===
At the time of the 2016 National Census, the village's population was 125 in 59 households.
