= Ebrahim Jil =

Village in Alborz province, Iran

Ebrahim Jil Persian: ابراهیم جیل
- Village
- Location within Iran
- Coordinates: 35°56′34″N 50°37′32″E
- Country: Iran
- Province: Alborz
- County: Nazarabad
- District: Central
- Rural District: Jamal ol Din

Population (2016)
  - Total: 156
- Time zone: UTC+3:30 (IRST)

Ebrahim Jil (Persian: ابراهیم جیل) is a village in Jamal ol Din Rural District of the Central District in Nazarabad County, Alborz province, Iran.

== Demographics ==
=== Population ===
At the time of the 2016 National Census, the village's population was 156 in 53 households.
