= Nowkand =

Nowkand or Now Kand (Persian: نوكند) may refer to:

- Now Kand, Alborz
- Nowkand, Birjand
- Nowkand, Sarbisheh
