= Qasemabad-e Bozorg =

Village in Alborz province, Iran

Qasemabad-e Bozorg Persian: قاسم‌آباد بزرگ
- Village
- Location within Iran
- Coordinates: 35°55′18″N 50°40′55″E
- Country: Iran
- Province: Alborz
- County: Savojbolagh
- District: Central
- Rural District: Saidabad

Population (2016)
  - Total: 6,142
- Time zone: UTC+3:30 (IRST)

Qasemabad-e Bozorg (Persian: قاسم‌آباد بزرگ) (Note: Also romanized as Qāsemābād-e Bozorg) is a village in Saidabad Rural District of the Central District in Savojbolagh County, Alborz province, Iran.

== Demographics ==
=== Population ===
At the time of the 2006 National Census, the village's population was 3,727 in 894 households, when it was in Tehran province. The 2016 census measured the population of the village as 6,142 people in 1,700 households, by which time the county had been separated from the province in the establishment of Alborz province. It was the most populous village in its rural district.
