= Rezaabad-e Sufian =

Village in Alborz province, Iran

Rezaabad-e Sufian Persian: رضاابادصوفيان
- Village
- Location within Iran
- Coordinates: 35°51′05″N 50°39′58″E
- Country: Iran
- Province: Alborz
- County: Savojbolagh
- District: Central
- Rural District: Saidabad

Population (2016)
  - Total: 831
- Time zone: UTC+3:30 (IRST)

Rezaabad-e Sufian (Persian: رضاابادصوفيان) (Note: Also romanized as Reẕāābād-e Şūfīān) is a village in Saidabad Rural District of the Central District in Savojbolagh County, Alborz province, Iran.

== Demographics ==
=== Population ===
At the time of the 2006 National Census, the village's population was 736 in 187 households, when it was in Tehran province. The 2016 census measured the population of the village as 831 people in 259 households, by which time the county had been separated from the province in the establishment of Alborz province.
