= Derakhshaniyeh =

Village in Alborz province, Iran

Derakhshaniyeh Persian: درخشانيه
- Village
- Location within Iran
- Country: Iran
- Province: Alborz
- County: Savojbolagh
- District: Central
- Rural District: Saidabad

Population (2016)
  - Total: 276
- Time zone: UTC+3:30 (IRST)

Derakhshaniyeh (Persian: درخشانيه) (Note: Also romanized as Derakhshānīyeh) is a village in Saidabad Rural District of the Central District in Savojbolagh County, Alborz province, Iran.

== Demographics ==
=== Population ===
At the time of the 2006 National Census, the village's population was 67 in 24 households, when it was in Tehran province. The 2016 census measured the population of the village as 276 people in 99 households, by which time the county had been separated from the province in the establishment of Alborz province.
