= Saidabad, Alborz =

Village in Alborz province, Iran

Saidabad Persian: سعيداباد
- Village
- Location within Iran
- Coordinates: 35°54′09″N 50°42′42″E
- Country: Iran
- Province: Alborz
- County: Savojbolagh
- District: Central
- Rural District: Saidabad

Population (2016)
  - Total: 2,556
- Time zone: UTC+3:30 (IRST)

Saidabad (Persian: سعيداباد) (Note: Also romanized as Sa‘īdābād) is a village in, and the capital of, Saidabad Rural District in the Central District of Savojbolagh County, Alborz province, Iran.

== Demographics ==
=== Population ===
At the time of the 2006 National Census, the village's population was 2,175 in 537 households, when it was in Tehran province. The 2016 census measured the population of the village as 2,556 people in 731 households, by which time the county had been separated from the province in the establishment of Alborz province.
