= Kushk-e Zar =

Neighborhood in Alborz province, Iran

Kushk-e Zar Persian: كوشك زر
- Neighborhood
- Location within Iran
- Coordinates: 35°59′22″N 50°45′47″E
- Country: Iran
- Province: Alborz
- County: Savojbolagh
- District: Central
- City: Mehestan

Population (2016)
  - Total: 855
- Time zone: UTC+3:30 (IRST)

Kushk-e Zar (Persian: كوشك زر) (Note: Also romanized as Kūshak Zar, and Kūshk-e Z̄ar; also known as Kashk Zar, Koshgozar, Koshk-e Zar, and Koshk-e Zar-e Qadīm) is a neighborhood in the city of Mehestan in the Central District of Savojbolagh County, Alborz province, Iran.

== Demographics ==
=== Population ===
At the time of the 2006 National Census, Kushk-e Zar's population was 495 in 137 households, when it was a village in Chendar Rural District of Chendar District in Tehran province. The 2016 census measured the population of the village as 855 people in 279 households, by which time the county had been separated from the province in the establishment of Alborz province.

After the census, Kushk-e Zar was annexed by the city of Mehestan.
