= Esmailabad, Alborz =

Village in Alborz province, Iran

Esmailabad Persian: اسماعيل اباد
- Village
- Location within Iran
- Country: Iran
- Province: Alborz
- County: Savojbolagh
- District: Central
- Rural District: Saidabad

Population (2016)
  - Total: 348
- Time zone: UTC+3:30 (IRST)

Esmailabad (Persian: اسماعيل اباد) (Note: Also romanized as Esmā‘īlābād) is a village in Saidabad Rural District of the Central District in Savojbolagh County, Alborz province, Iran.

== Demographics ==
=== Population ===
At the time of the 2006 National Census, the village's population was 230 in 62 households, when it was in Tehran province. The 2016 census measured the population of the village as 348 people in 104 households, by which time the county had been separated from the province in the establishment of Alborz province.
