= Abbasabad-e Kuchek =

Village in Alborz province, Iran

Abbasabad-e Kuchek Persian: عباس‌آباد کوچک
- Village
- Location within Iran
- Coordinates: 35°52′34″N 50°43′06″E
- Country: Iran
- Province: Alborz
- County: Savojbolagh
- District: Central
- Rural District: Saidabad

Population (2016)
  - Total: 493
- Time zone: UTC+3:30 (IRST)

Abbasabad-e Kuchek (Persian: عباس‌آباد کوچک) (Note: Also romanized as ‘Abbāsābād-e Kūchek) is a village in Saidabad Rural District of the Central District in Savojbolagh County, Alborz province, Iran.

== Demographics ==
=== Population ===
At the time of the 2006 National Census, the village's population was 425 in 113 households, when it was in Tehran province. The 2016 census measured the population of the village as 493 people in 156 households, by which time the county had been separated from the province in the establishment of Alborz province.
