= Namak Alan =

Village in Alborz province, Iran

Namak Alan Persian: نمكلان
- Village
- Location within Iran
- Coordinates: 35°53′08″N 50°40′57″E
- Country: Iran
- Province: Alborz
- County: Savojbolagh
- District: Central
- Rural District: Saidabad

Population (2016)
  - Total: 434
- Time zone: UTC+3:30 (IRST)

Namak Alan (Persian: نمكلان) (Note: Also romanized as Namak Ālān and Namak Kalān) is a village in Saidabad Rural District of the Central District in Savojbolagh County, Alborz province, Iran.

== Demographics ==
=== Population ===
At the time of the 2006 National Census, the village's population was 273 in 77 households, when it was in Tehran province. The 2016 census measured the population of the village as 434 people in 136 households, by which time the county had been separated from the province in the establishment of Alborz province.
