= Abbasabad-e Bozorg =

Village in Alborz province, Iran

Abbasabad-e Bozorg Persian: عباس‌آباد بزرگ
- Village
- Location within Iran
- Coordinates: 35°51′49″N 50°43′28″E
- Country: Iran
- Province: Alborz
- County: Savojbolagh
- District: Central
- Rural District: Saidabad

Population (2016)
  - Total: 667
- Time zone: UTC+3:30 (IRST)

Abbasabad-e Bozorg (Persian: عباس‌آباد بزرگ) (Note: Also romanized as ‘Abbāsābād-e Bozorg) is a village in Saidabad Rural District of the Central District in Savojbolagh County, Alborz province, Iran.

== Demographics ==
=== Population ===
At the time of the 2006 National Census, the village's population was 1,070 in 245 households, when it was in Tehran province. The 2016 census measured the population of the village as 667 people in 262 households, by which time the county had been separated from the province in the establishment of Alborz province.
