= Aran, Alborz =

Village in Alborz province, Iran

Aran Persian: آران
- Village
- Location within Iran
- Coordinates: 35°51′32″N 50°41′22″E
- Country: Iran
- Province: Alborz
- County: Savojbolagh
- District: Central
- Rural District: Saidabad

Population (2016)
  - Total: 606
- Time zone: UTC+3:30 (IRST)

Aran (Persian: اران) (Note: Also romanized as Ārān) is a village in Saidabad Rural District of the Central District in Savojbolagh County, Alborz province, Iran.

== Demographics ==
=== Population ===
At the time of the 2006 National Census, the village's population was 342 in 94 households, when it was in Tehran province. The 2016 census measured the population of the village as 606 people in 195 households, by which time the county had been separated from the province in the establishment of Alborz province.
