= Masudiyeh =

Village in Alborz province, Iran

Masudiyeh Persian: مسعوديه
- Village
- Location within Iran
- Country: Iran
- Province: Alborz
- County: Savojbolagh
- District: Central
- Rural District: Saidabad

Population (2016)
  - Total: 348
- Time zone: UTC+3:30 (IRST)

Masudiyeh (Persian: مسعوديه) (Note: Also romanized as Masʿūdīyeh) is a village in Saidabad Rural District of the Central District in Savojbolagh County, Alborz province, Iran.

== Demographics ==
=== Population ===
At the time of the 2006 National Census, the village's population was 46 in 10 households, when it was in Tehran province. The 2016 census measured the population of the village as 108 people in 40 households, by which time the county had been separated from the province in the establishment of Alborz province.
