= Sorkhab, Alborz =

Village in Alborz province, Iran

Sorkhab Persian: سرخاب
- Village
- Location within Iran
- Coordinates: 35°52′52″N 50°42′48″E
- Country: Iran
- Province: Alborz
- County: Savojbolagh
- District: Central
- Rural District: Saidabad

Population (2016)
  - Total: 2,615
- Time zone: UTC+3:30 (IRST)

Sorkhab (Persian: سرخاب) (Note: Also romanized as Sorkhāb) is a village in Saidabad Rural District of the Central District in Savojbolagh County, Alborz province, Iran.

== Demographics ==
=== Population ===
At the time of the 2006 National Census, the village's population was 2,501 in 611 households, when it was in Tehran province. The 2016 census measured the population of the village as 2,615 people in 820 households, by which time the county had been separated from the province in the establishment of Alborz province.
