= Kargalin =

Village in Alborz province, Iran

Kargalin Persian: كرگلين
- Village
- Location within Iran
- Country: Iran
- Province: Alborz
- County: Savojbolagh
- District: Central
- Rural District: Saidabad

Population (2016)
  - Total: 896
- Time zone: UTC+3:30 (IRST)

Kargalin (Persian: كرگلين) (Note: Also romanized as Kargalīn) is a village in Saidabad Rural District of the Central District in Savojbolagh County, Alborz province, Iran.

== Demographics ==
=== Population ===
At the time of the 2006 National Census, the village's population was 640 in 169 households, when it was in Tehran province. The 2016 census measured the population of the village as 896 people in 286 households, by which time the county had been separated from the province in the establishment of Alborz province.
