= Qasemabad-e Aqa =

Village in Alborz province, Iran

Qasemabad-e Aqa Persian: قاسم‌آباد آقا
- Village
- Location within Iran
- Coordinates: 35°52′15″N 50°43′15″E
- Country: Iran
- Province: Alborz
- County: Savojbolagh
- District: Central
- Rural District: Saidabad

Population (2016)
  - Total: 1,166
- Time zone: UTC+3:30 (IRST)

Qasemabad-e Aqa (Persian: قاسم‌آباد آقا) (Note: Also romanized as Qāsemābād-e Āqā; also known as Qāsemābād-e Moz̧affarī) is a village in Saidabad Rural District of the Central District in Savojbolagh County, Alborz province, Iran.

== Demographics ==
=== Population ===
At the time of the 2006 National Census, the village's population was 918 in 220 households, when it was in Tehran province. The 2016 census measured the population of the village as 1,166 people in 357 households, by which time the county had been separated from the province in the establishment of Alborz province.
