= Hoseynabad-e Kushk Zar =

Village in Alborz province, Iran

Hoseynabad-e Kushk Zar Persian: حسين ابادكوشكذر
- Village
- Location within Iran
- Coordinates: 35°56′40″N 50°43′32″E
- Country: Iran
- Province: Alborz
- County: Savojbolagh
- District: Central
- Rural District: Saidabad

Population (2016)
  - Total: 798
- Time zone: UTC+3:30 (IRST)

Hoseynabad-e Kushk Zar (Persian: حسين ابادكوشكذر) (Note: Also romanized as Ḩoseynābād-e Kūshk Zar; also known as Ḩoseynābād-e Kūshkeh Zar) is a village in Saidabad Rural District of the Central District in Savojbolagh County, Alborz province, Iran.

== Demographics ==
=== Population ===
At the time of the 2006 National Census, the village's population was 174 in 45 households, when it was in Tehran province. The 2016 census measured the population of the village as 798 people in 226 households, by which time the county had been separated from the province in the establishment of Alborz province.
