= Seyfabad-e Bozorg =

Neighborhood in Alborz province, Iran

Seyfabad-e Bozorg Persian: سيف ابادبزرگ
- Neighborhood
- Location within Iran
- Country: Iran
- Province: Alborz
- County: Savojbolagh
- District: Central
- City: Golsar

Population (2006)
  - Total: 5,764
- Time zone: UTC+3:30 (IRST)

Seyfabad-e Bozorg (Persian: سيف ابادبزرگ) (Note: Also romanized as Seyfābād-e Bozorg; also known as Seyfābād and Seyfābād-e Pol-e Kordān) is a neighborhood in the city of Golsar in the Central District of Savojbolagh County, Alborz province, Iran.

== Demographics ==
=== Population ===
At the time of the 2006 National Census, Seyfabad-e Bozorg's population was 5,764 in 1,494 households, when it was a village in Saidabad Rural District of Tehran province.

In 2007, the village merged with Seyfabad-e Khaleseh to form the city of Seyfabad, later renamed Golsar. In 2010, the county was separated from the province in the establishment of Alborz province.
