= Soltanabad-e Aran =

Village in Alborz province, Iran

Soltanabad-e Aran Persian: سلطان اباداران
- Village
- Location within Iran
- Country: Iran
- Province: Alborz
- County: Savojbolagh
- District: Central
- Rural District: Saidabad

Population (2016)
  - Total: 781
- Time zone: UTC+3:30 (IRST)

Soltanabad-e Aran (Persian: سلطان اباداران) (Note: Also romanized as Solţānābād-e Ārān; also known as Solţānābād and Sulţānābād) is a village in Saidabad Rural District of the Central District in Savojbolagh County, Alborz province, Iran.

== Demographics ==
=== Population ===
At the time of the 2006 National Census, the village's population was 594 in 145 households, when it was part of Tehran province. The 2016 census recorded the population of the village as 781 people in 237 households, by which time the county had been separated from Tehran province following the establishment of Alborz province.
