= Eyqer Bolagh =

Village in Alborz province, Iran

Eyqer Bolagh Persian: ايقربلاغ
- Village
- Location within Iran
- Coordinates: 35°54′36″N 50°41′59″E
- Country: Iran
- Province: Alborz
- County: Savojbolagh
- District: Central
- Rural District: Saidabad

Population (2016)
  - Total: 1,363
- Time zone: UTC+3:30 (IRST)

Eyqer Bolagh (Persian: ايقربلاغ) (Note: Also romanized as Eyqer Bolāgh) is a village in Saidabad Rural District of the Central District in Savojbolagh County, Alborz province, Iran.

== Demographics ==
=== Population ===
At the time of the 2006 National Census, the village's population was 1,045 in 263 households, when it was in Tehran province. The 2016 census measured the population of the village as 1,363 people in 421 households, by which time the county had been separated from the province in the establishment of Alborz province.
