= Ahmadabad-e Etemad ol Dowleh =

Village in Alborz province, Iran

Ahmadabad-e Etemad ol Dowleh Persian: احمدآباد اعتمادالدوله
- Village
- Location within Iran
- Coordinates: 35°52′27″N 50°41′08″E
- Country: Iran
- Province: Alborz
- County: Savojbolagh
- District: Central
- Rural District: Saidabad

Population (2016)
  - Total: 381
- Time zone: UTC+3:30 (IRST)

Ahmadabad-e Etemad ol Dowleh (Persian: احمدآباد اعتمادالدوله) (Note: Also romanized as Āḩmadābād-e E‘temād ed Dowleh and Āḩmadābād-e E‘temād ol Dowleh; also known as Āḩmadābād) is a village in Saidabad Rural District of the Central District in Savojbolagh County, Alborz province, Iran.

== Demographics ==
=== Population ===
At the time of the 2006 National Census, the village's population was 301 in 87 households, when it was in Tehran province. The 2016 census measured the population of the village as 381 people in 108 households, by which time the county had been separated from the province in the establishment of Alborz province.
