= Seyfabad-e Khaleseh =

Neighborhood in Alborz province, Iran

Seyfabad-e Khaleseh Persian: سيف ابادخالصه
- Neighborhood
- Location within Iran
- Coordinates: 35°54′28″N 50°46′57″E
- Country: Iran
- Province: Alborz
- County: Savojbolagh
- District: Central
- City: Golsar

Population (2006)
  - Total: 5,249
- Time zone: UTC+3:30 (IRST)

Seyfabad-e Khaleseh (Persian: سيف ابادخالصه) (Note: Also romanized as Seyfābād-e Khāleşeh) is a neighborhood in the city of Golsar in the Central District of Savojbolagh County, Alborz province, Iran.

== Demographics ==
=== Population ===
At the time of the 2006 National Census, Seyfabad-e Khaleseh's population was 5,249 in 1,281 households, when it was a village in Saidabad Rural District of Tehran province.

In 2007, the village merged with Seyfabad-e Bozorg to form the city of Seyfabad, later renamed Golsar. In 2010, the county was separated from the province in the establishment of Alborz province.
