= Mehestan =

Mehestan (or Mehestān) can refer to:

- Mehestan, Iran, a city
- A historical deliberative assembly in Iran; see History of the parliament in Iran
