= Seyfiabad =

Seyfiabad (Persian: سيفي اباد) may refer to:

- Seyfiabad, Bushehr
- Seyfiabad, Zanjan

== See also ==
- Safiabad (disambiguation)
- Seyfabad (disambiguation)
