= Tankaman-e Shomali Rural District =

Rural district in Alborz province, Iran

Tankaman-e Shomali Rural District Persian: دهستان تنکمان شمالي
- Rural District
- Location within Iran
- Coordinates: 35°55′N 50°39′E
- Country: Iran
- Province: Alborz
- County: Nazarabad
- District: Tankaman
- Established: 2007
- Capital: Bakhtiar

Population (2016)
  - Total: 10,790
- Time zone: UTC+3:30 (IRST)

Tankaman-e Shomali Rural District (Persian: دهستان تنکمان شمالي) is in Tankaman District of Nazarabad County, Alborz province, Iran. Its capital is the village of Bakhtiar.

== History ==
Tankaman-e Shomali Rural District was created in Tankaman District in 2007. In 2010, the county was separated from Tehran in the establishment of Alborz province.

== Demographics ==
=== Population ===
At the time of the 2016 National Census, the rural district's population was 10,790 people in 3,302 households. The most populous of its 15 villages was Bakhtiar, with 3,520 people.

=== Other villages in the rural district ===
- Anbar Tappeh
- Dangizak
- Ebrahim Beygi
- Firuzabad
- Hajji Beyk
- Now Kand
- Qaleh-ye Azari
- Qasemabad-e Kuchek
- Sherkat-e Yush
