= Jamal ol Din Rural District =

Rural district in Alborz province, Iran

Jamal ol Din Rural District Persian: دهستان جمال الدين
- Rural District
- Location within Iran
- Coordinates: 35°57′N 50°38′E
- Country: Iran
- Province: Alborz
- County: Nazarabad
- District: Central
- Established: 2007

Population (2016)
  - Total: 1,443
- Time zone: UTC+3:30 (IRST)

Jamal ol Din Rural District (Persian: دهستان جمال الدين) is in the Central District of Nazarabad County, Alborz province, Iran.

== History ==
Jamal ol Din Rural District was created in the Central District in 2007. In 2010, the county was separated from the province in the establishment of Alborz province.

== Demographics ==
=== Population ===
At the time of the 2016 census, the rural district's population was 1,443 people in 477 households. The most populous of its three villages was Karkhaneh-e Fakhr-e Iran, with 1,162 people.

=== Other villages in the rural district ===
- Ebrahim Jil
- Hoseynabad
