= Mahmoud Zamani Qummi =

Iranian politician

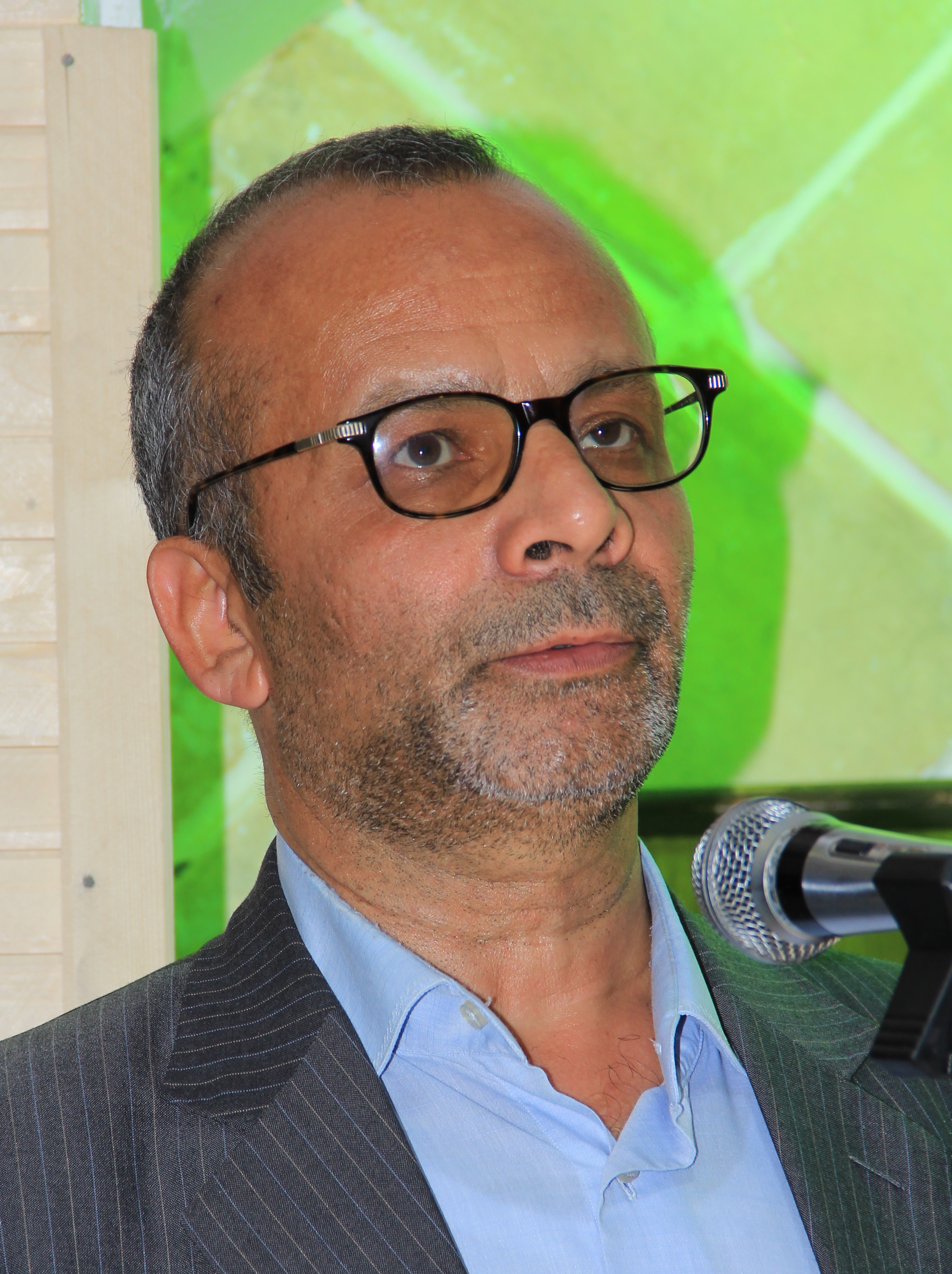
محمود زمانی قمی

Mahmoud Zamani Qummi (Persian: محمود زمانی قمی) is an Iranian reform politician who served as governor of Yazd Province from 2017 to 2018. Qummi served as governor of Chaharmahal and Bakhtiari Province from 2003 to 2005 and governor of Markazi Province from 2015 to 2017 .
