= Yengi Emam Caravansari =

UNESCO World Heritage Site in Iran

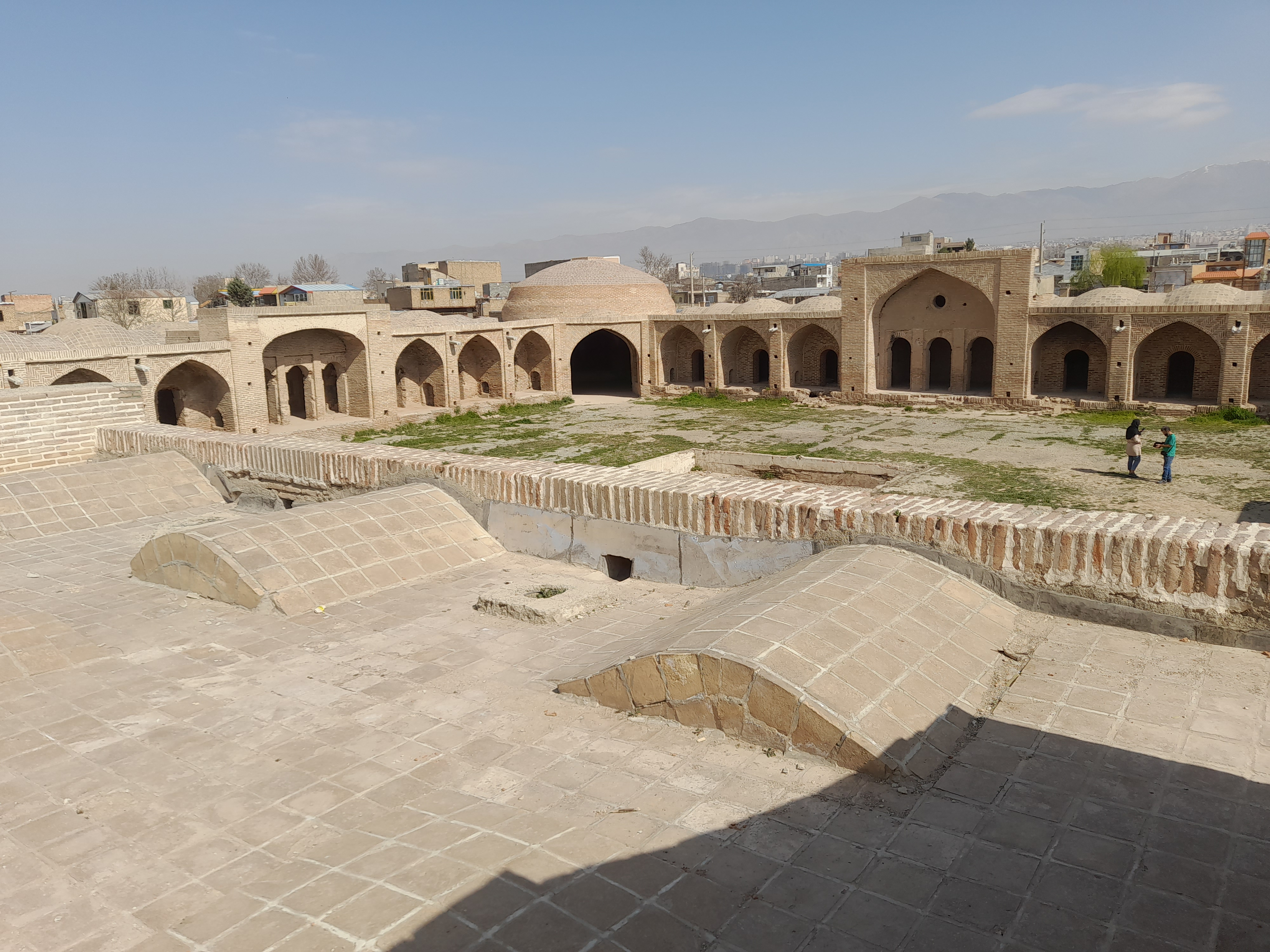

- Location within Iran
- 35.93786°N 50.704°E
- Location: Yengi Emam, Iran

History
- Built: 17th Century

UNESCO World Heritage Site
- Type: Cultural
- Criteria: ii, iii
- Designated: 2023
- Part of: The Persian Caravanserai
- Reference no.: 1668-034

Yengi Emam Caravansari (Persian: کاروانسرای ینگه امام) is located in Alborz province in the hills of Yengi Emam. The caravansary is considered an important site for Iranian architecture that evolved in the Silk Road. The building dates to the 17th century (11th century AH).

The site is being rehabilitated by UNESCO and the European Union under Silk Roads Heritage Corridors in Afghanistan, Central Asia and Iran – International Dimension of the European Year of Cultural Heritage program.

== Architecture ==
The building has a square central courtyard. The corners of the courtyard are angled, and passageways lead to the octagonal halls. The halls lead onto wide corridors.
