= 2007–08 Iran Football's 3rd Division =

Iran Football's 3rd Division
- Season: 2007–08

The following is the standings of the 3rd Division's 2007/08 football season. This is the 4th rated football competition in Iran after the Azadegan League, Persian Gulf Cup and 2nd Division.

== Teams ==
=== Group 1 ===
- Khayerin Marand
- Setare Hashtgerd
- Setare Sorkh Zanjan
- Shahrdari Ardebil
- Shahrdari Lahijan
- Shahrdari Shahr-e Qods

=== Group 2 ===
- Choka Talesh
- Dorna Tehran
- Fajr Gilan
- Iran Khodro Rey
- Mighat Qom
- Oghab Gonbad

=== Group 3 ===
- Bargh Bistoon Kermanshah
- Ehsan Rey
- Parnia Malayer
- Pars Malek Ashtar Arak
- Shahin Karaj
- Shisheh Qazvin

=== Group 4 ===
- 04 Birjand Birjand
- Abfa Saravan Sistan and Baluchestan
- Shahrdari Kerman
- Shahrdari Yazd
- Takht-e-Jamshid Shiraz
- Tarbiat Badani Bandar Abbas

=== Group 5 ===
- Esteghlal Shahrood
- Persepolis Qa'em Shahr
- Petroshimi Bojnurd
- Raad Tehran
- Saba Battery Golestan
- Shahrdari Eslamshahr
- Shahrdari Mashhad

=== Group 6 ===
- Esteghlal Takestan
- Persepolis Ilam
- Samand Tehran
- San'at Kermanshah
- Sardar Bokan
- Shahrdari Baneh
- Shahrdari Hamedan

=== Group 7 ===
- Abozar Gangan Bushehr
- Loleh Sasi Ahvaz
- Mes Novin Kerman
- Paris Esfahan
- Persepolis Genaveh
- Persepolis Kashan
- Sazman Varzesh Kish Kish

=== Group 8 ===
- Moghvemat Bushehr
- Naft Novin Abadan
- Naft Va Gaz Gachsaran
- Persepolis Khorramabad
- Shahed Najaf Abad
- Shahrdari Borazjan
- Shahrekord F.C. Shahrekord

== Second round ==
=== Group A ===
- Abozar Gangan Bushehr
- Loleh Sasi Ahvaz
- Naft Novin Abadan
- Samand Tehran
- Shahed Najaf Abad
- Shahrdari Hamedan
- Shahrdari Kerman - (Promoted in 2nd Division 2008-09)
- Tarbiat Badani Bandar Abbas - (Promoted in 2nd Division 2008-09)

=== Group B ===
- Dorna Tehran
- Ehsan Rey
- Fajr Gilan
- Persepolis Qa'em Shahr
- Raad Tehran - (Promoted in 2nd Division 2008-09)
- Setare Hashtgerd
- Shahrdari Lahijan - (Promoted in 2nd Division 2008-09)
- Shisheh Qazvin
