= Anbar Tappeh =

Anbar Tappeh (Persian: انبارتپه) may refer to:

- Anbar Tappeh, Alborz
- Anbar Tappeh, Golestan
