= Qarah Qobad =

Qarah Qobad and Qareh Qobad (Persian: قره قباد) may refer to:

- Qarah Qobad, Alborz
- Qarah Qobad, Qazvin
