= Gholam Hossein Mozaffari =

Iranian business executive (b. 1968)

- غلام‌حسین مظفری

Governor General of Razavi Khorasan
- Incumbent
- Assumed office 9 October 2024
- President: Masoud Pezeshkian
- Preceded by: Yaghob-Ali Nazari

Member of the Parliament of Iran
- In office 27 May 2004 – 26 May 2008
- Succeeded by: Ali Hosseini
- Constituency: Nishapur

Personal details
- Born: 21 May 1968 (age 58)
- Party: Reformist
- Education: Ferdowsi University of Mashhad

Gholam Hossein Mozaffari (Persian: غلام‌حسین مظفری; born 21 May 1968) is an Iranian executive director and politician who currently serves as the governor general of Razavi Khorasan Province since 2024. Mozaffari was a member of the Parliament of Iran from 2004 to 2008, representing Nishapur.
