= Mohammad Javad Kolivand =

Iranian politician (b. 1967)

- محمدجواد کولیوند
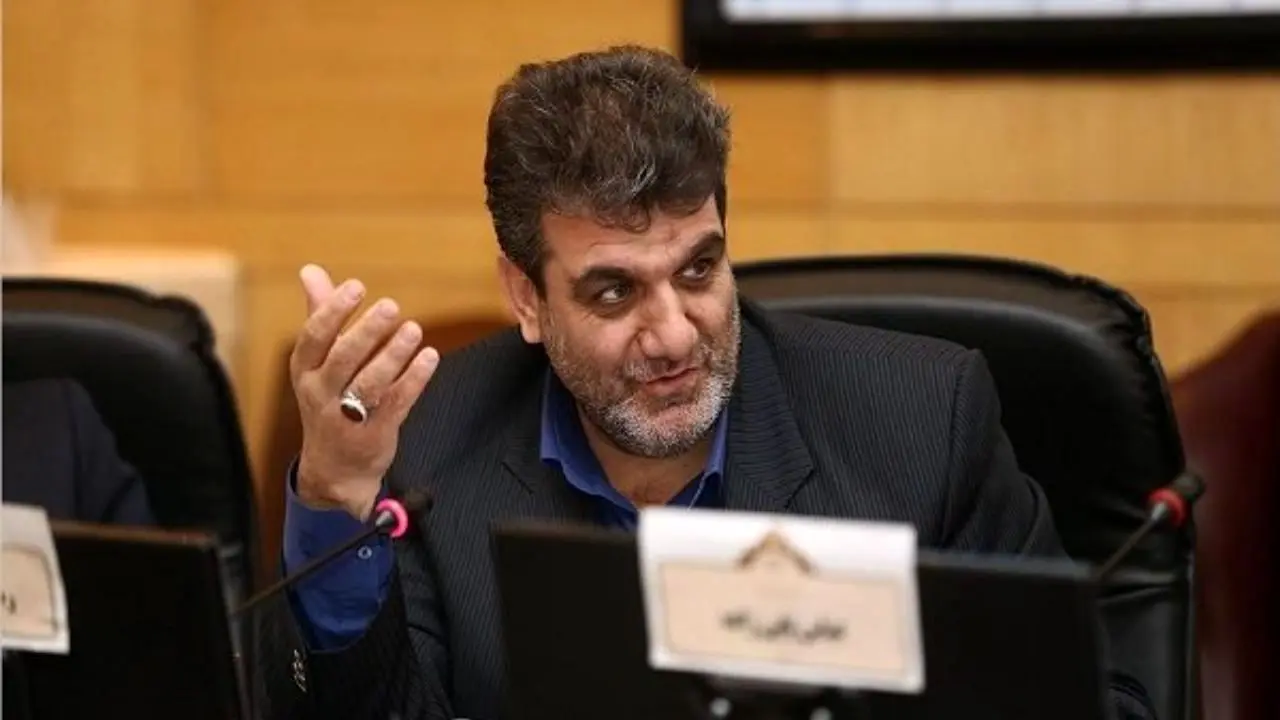

Governor General of Semnan
- Incumbent
- Assumed office 24 November 2024
- President: Masoud Pezeshkian
- Preceded by: Mohammad-Reza Hashemi

Member of the Parliament of Iran
- In office 27 May 2012 – 26 May 2020
- Constituency: Karaj, Eshtehard and Fardis

Personal details
- Born: 1967 (age 58–59) Tuyserkan, Iran
- Party: Independent

Mohammad Javad Kolivand (Persian: محمد جواد کولیوند; born 1967, Tuyserkan, Iran) is an Iranian politician who currently serves as the governor general of Semnan Province since 2024.

He served as a member of the ninth and tenth terms of the Islamic Parliament of Iran. He is the former chairman of the Councils and Internal Affairs Commission of the Islamic Parliament of Iran. Javad is the former Deputy Governor General of Tehran and former Director General of Property at Foreign Ministry. He was former Deputy Minister of Interior for Parliamentary Affairs.
