= Mehestan, Iran =

City in Alborz province, Iran

Mehestan Persian: مهستان
- City
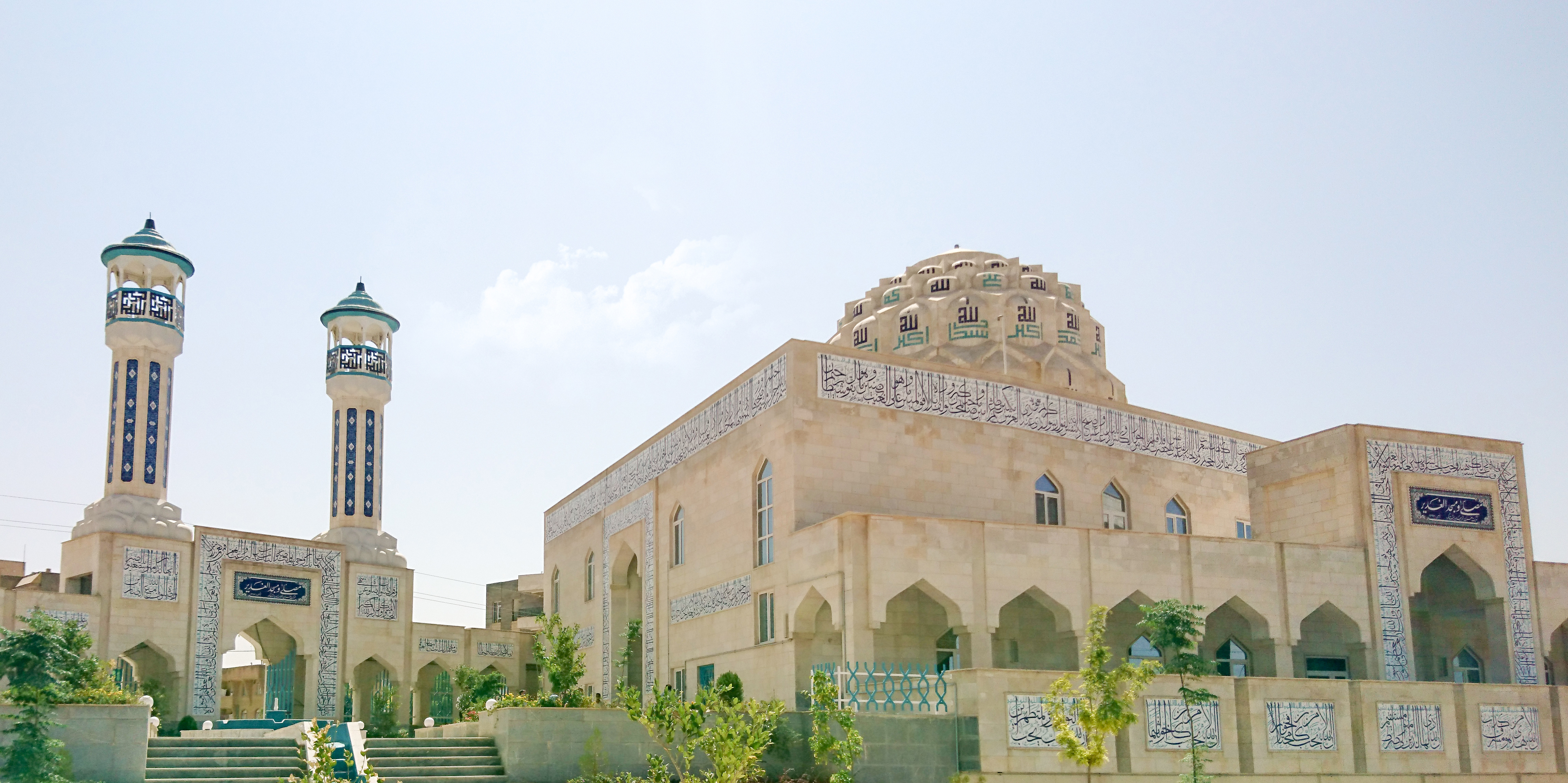
- Alikhani Mosque
- Interactive map of Mehestan
- Location in Iran and Asia Mehestan (Asia)
- Coordinates: 35°58′38″N 50°43′38″E
- Country: Iran
- Province: Alborz
- County: Savojbolagh
- District: Central

Government
  - Mayor: Ali Golrokhi
  - City Council Chairman: Hamed Bakhtiari

Area
  - Urban: 48 km^{2} (19 sq mi)
- Elevation: 1,310 to 1,610 m (4,300 to 5,280 ft)

Population (2021 Census)
  - Urban: 85,200
- Time zone: UTC+3:30 (IRST)
- Area code: (+98) 26
- Website: hashtgerdnc.ir

Mehestan (Persian: مهستان) (Note: (Formerly Shahr-e Jadid-e Hashtgerd (شهر جديد هشتگرد; ['ʃæhre 'dʒædi:de hæʃ'gerd]) (English: Hashtgerd New City)) is in the Central District of Savojbolagh County, Alborz province. In the vicinity of Hashtgerd, it was built in recent years.

== History ==
The plan to create new cities in order to respond to the widespread need for housing and to prevent car cities in the urban area of metropolises was put forward as a policy and a serious necessity in the government's agenda. At the end of 1985, the government board approved and notified the transfer of 16,000 hectares of land from Fashand village to the Ministry of Housing and Urban Development for the creation of satellite cities. The Ministry of Housing and Urban Development was responsible for the implementation of this plan, and the location and acquisition of land and the preparation, design and implementation of it through the New Cities Construction Company and its subsidiaries were continuously followed up.

In 1988, a contract was signed with various Iranian consulting engineers for the preparation of study plans and comprehensive plans for several new cities in the urban area of Tehran. In 1989, the creation of these cities and their location was approved by the Supreme Council of Urban Planning, and the new city of Hashtgerd with 500,000 people in the western axis is one of these cities.[2]

In 1991, the Supreme Council of Architecture and Urban Development entrusted the implementation of this plan to Hashtgerd New City Development Company. The name of the city was changed from the Shahr-e Jadid-e Hashtgerd to Mehestan in 2023.

== New city studies ==
The location studies for the New City of Hashtgerd were assigned to consulting engineers in 1987, and the Tehran-Qazvin axis was recognized as the first priority and the most suitable development axis.

In 1988, the studies of the New City of Hashtgerd were assigned to the consulting engineers of Shahrsaz (as the main consulting engineer and coordinator) in the three fields of prerequisite, strategic and comprehensive plan. At the same time, the studies of transportation (inside and outside the city) and city facilities were started with other consulting engineers, and based on various statistics and information, the preparation of various population and employment forecasting models was finally prepared and presented. The proposed pattern of urban development was matched with the patterns and options suggested by transportation and urban facilities consultants and the final pattern of city development was determined with some changes. The development model of the city was integrated with the geographical and physical condition of the lands of the new city and its surroundings, and based on the general design goals and criteria, the preliminary plan and the comprehensive plan of the New City of Hashtgerd were prepared.

== Demographics ==
=== Population ===
At the time of the 2006 National Census, the city's population was 15,619 in 4,353 households, when it was named Shahr-e Jadid-e Hashtgerd in Tehran province. The 2016 census measured the population of the city as 42,147 in 13,622 households, by which time the county had been separated from the province in the establishment of Alborz province. Mehestan annexed the village of Kushk-e Zar in 2022.

According to the census of Iran Statistics Center, the population of the city in 2018 was equal to 49,417 people. The population in June 2020 was 60,866 people, and in September 2021 it was 85,200 people. According to the comprehensive plan of Hashtgerd, the population capacity of this city is more than 500,000 people, which enables the development of the city up to 1 million people. In addition, the area of this city will reach 8 thousand hectares from the current 4,800 hectares at the end of the fourth development plan.

== Reasons for choosing the region ==
- The main factors considered in choosing the new city of Mehestan are:
- The optimal distance between New City and Tehran (65 km from Tehran-Qazvin highway). Not so far that the attraction of Tehran region does not exist in the city and not so close that it is connected to Tehran in the form of continuous development.
- The slope is acceptable for urban development and the soil is suitable for the establishment of tall structures
- Proper access to water sources: underground water, water from nearby dams such as Taleghan Dam
- Suitable geographical and natural situation, moderate mountain climate
- Good distance to big cities around
- near Alborz mountain range
- Location and communication

Access to Mehestan is provided through the Karaj-Qazvin freeway, which will be connected to the city by three non-level intersections in the future. In addition, the presence of the Tehran-Qazvin Expressway and the national railway in the south of the old city of Hashtgerd, as well as the continuation of the Tehran Hashtgerd high-speed electric railway (Line 5 of the Tehran Subway), are among the access points of this city.

Hashtgerd subway station

== Geography ==
Mehestan is located on the southern slope of the Alborz Mountains and the northern edge of the central desert of Iran, and in terms of climate, it is located between the mountainous climate and the semi-arid and arid interior climate. In terms of general classification, the climate of this region is of Mediterranean type.

Mehestan is in the west of Alborz province at an altitude of 1,310 to 1,610 meters above sea level and between longitudes of 50 degrees 25 minutes and 50 degrees 55 minutes and latitudes of 35 degrees 45 minutes and 36 degrees 5 minutes. Hashtgerd plain generally has cold winters and hot and dry summers, but the amount of heat is not the same in all parts of the plain and its amount decreases in the mountainous areas.

The temperature of the city usually varies between (-16) degrees Celsius in winter and (38) degrees Celsius in summer; And compared to Tehran, it is usually between 3 and 6 degrees cooler. The maximum relative humidity in the region is close to 80% and the annual average is about 49%.

Due to the mountainous nature of the Hashtgerd region, this region has sufficient rainfall during the rainy season. The average annual rainfall for 35 consecutive years is 373 mm.

== Overall structure of the city ==
Highway

Mehestan consists of two main residential and industrial parts.

The industrial sector with an area of about 200 hectares is located in the south of the highway. This section is designed to provide employment for the new city and prevent the city from becoming a dormitory. It is expected that the employment sector will be developed up to 350 hectares. The units located in this sector are mainly divided into two groups:

Machine units, molding, fine industries and computers

National units that can be established in Tehran province

At present, land has been assigned to 160 industrial units that have the approval in principle from the Ministry of Industries and the necessary license from the Environmental Organization. The number of units in the production line is about 50 units and the built units are 45 units.

== Mayors ==
Mashallah Izadiyar

Mojtaba Askari

Ebrahim Khalili

Kamran Azimzadeh (for 6 years)[5]

Mohammad Aghaei Meybadi (temporary supervisor of the municipality)[6]

Seyyed Masoud Bozorgzadeh

Nasser Amir Kamali (temporary supervisor of the municipality)

Asghar Aghaei

Nasser Amir Kamali (supervisor of the municipality) [7]

Mohsen Majzoub
