= Tankaman =

City in Alborz province, Iran

Tankaman Persian: تنکمان
- City
- Location within Iran
- Coordinates: 35°53′28″N 50°36′59″E
- Country: Iran
- Province: Alborz
- County: Nazarabad
- District: Tankaman
- Established as a city: 2007

Population (2016)
  - Total: 4,654
- Time zone: UTC+3:30 (IRST)

Tankaman (Persian: تنکمان) (Note: Also romanized as Tankamān; also known as Tangemān) is a city in, and the capital of, Tankaman District in Nazarabad County, Alborz province, Iran. It also serves as the administrative center for Tankaman-e Jonubi Rural District. (Note: Formerly Tankaman Rural District)

== Demographics ==
=== Population ===
At the time of the 2006 National Census, Tankaman's population was 4,742 in 1,226 households, when it was a village in Tankaman Rural District (Note: Renamed Tankaman-e Jonubi Rural District) of Tehran province. In 2010, the county was separated from the province in the establishment of Alborz province. The 2016 census measured the population as 4,654 in 1,459 households, by which time Tankaman had been converted to a city.
