= Manouchehr Habibi =

Governor of Kermanshah (born 1971)

Manuchehr Habibi
- منوچهر حبیبی

Governor General of Kermanshah
- Incumbent
- Assumed office 27 November 2024
- President: Masoud Pezeshkian
- Preceded by: Mohammad-Tayeb Sahraie

Personal details
- Born: January 1, 1971 (age 55) Kohgiluyeh and Boyer-Ahmad, Iran
- Party: None
- Occupation: Politician, Executive director
- Cabinet: Government of Masoud Pezeshkian

Manuchehr Habibi (Persian: منوچهر حبیبی; born 1971) is an Iranian politician who has serves as the Governor of Kermanshah Province since November 2024.

== Education ==
Habibi is an official employee of the Ministry of Interior and holds a bachelor's degree in roads and construction, a master's degree in management, and a doctorate in urban planning.
