= Mojtaba Abdollahi =

Iranian politician

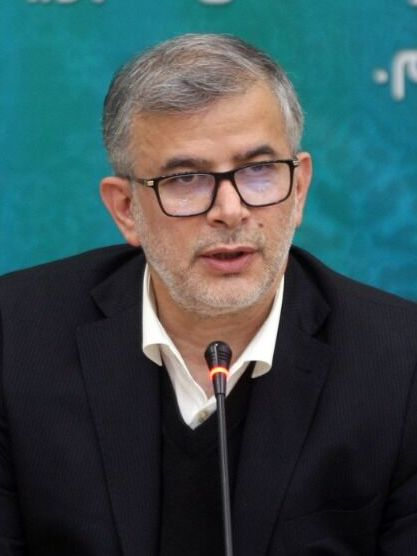

Governor General of Alborz
- Incumbent
- Assumed office 7 November 2021
- President: Ebrahim Raisi Masoud Pezeshkian
- Preceded by: Azizollah Shahbazi

Personal details
- Born: 1966 (age 59–60) Tehran, Iran
- Party: Principlist

Mojtaba Abdollahi (Persian: مجتبی عبداللهی, born 1966 in Tehran) is an Iranian conservative politician who currently serves as the governor general of Alborz province since 2021.
