= Arash Zarehtan Lahoni =

Iranian politician (b. 1975)

- آرش زره‌تن لهونی

Governor General of Kurdistan
- Incumbent
- Assumed office 18 September 2024
- President: Masoud Pezeshkian
- Preceded by: Esmaeil Zarei Kousha

Member of the Parliament of Iran
- In office 27 May 2020 – 26 May 2024
- Preceded by: Shahab Naderi
- Succeeded by: Rastegar Yousefi
- Constituency: Paveh, Javanrud, Salas-e Babajani and Ravansar

Personal details
- Born: 1975 (age 50–51) Paveh, Iran
- Party: Reformist
- Education: University of Isfahan

Arash Zarehtan Lahoni (Persian: آرش زره‌تن لهونی; born 1975) is an Iranian politician who has served as the governors general of Kurdistan Province since September 2024. He was appointed to this position during the 14th government cabinet meeting. Zarehtan Lahoni was elected to the 11th Islamic Consultative Assembly, representing the electoral district of Paveh, Javanrud, Salas Babajani, and Ravansar in Kermanshah Province. He is the first Sunni governor appointed to the post in Iran in 45 years.

== Career ==
- Head of the Red Crescent Society of Kermanshah Province
- Governor of Javanrud
- Director of Budget for the Red Crescent Society
- Member of the Islamic City Council of Sanandaj
- CEO of the Red Crescent Society of Kurdistan Province
- Member of the Supreme Council of the Red Crescent
- Deputy Governor for Economic Affairs of Kurdistan Province
