= Golsar, Iran =

City in Alborz province, Iran

Golsar Persian: گلسار
- City
- Location within Iran
- Coordinates: 35°54′51″N 50°46′17″E
- Country: Iran
- Province: Alborz
- County: Savojbolagh
- District: Central
- Established as a city: 2007

Population (2016)
  - Total: 13,745
- Time zone: UTC+3:30 (IRST)

Golsar (Persian: گلسار) (Note: Formerly known as Seyfabad (سيف اباد), also romanized as Seyfābād; also known as Seyfābād-e Pol-e Kordān) is a city in the Central District of Savojbolagh County, Alborz province, Iran.

== History ==
In 2007, the villages of Seyfabad-e Bozorg and Seyfabad-e Khaleseh in Saidabad Rural District of Tehran Province merged to form the city of Seyfabad, which was renamed Golsar in 2010. In 2010, the county was separated from the province in the establishment of Alborz Province.

== Demographics ==
=== Population ===
The 2016 National Census measured the population of the city as 13,745 people in 4,103 households.
