= Nowkand, Birjand =

Nowkand نوكند
- Village
- Location within Iran
- Coordinates: 32°46′57″N 59°30′46″E
- Country: Iran
- Province: South Khorasan
- County: Birjand
- Bakhsh: Central
- Rural District: Baqeran

Population (2006)
  - Total: 94
- Time zone: UTC+3:30 (IRST)
  - Summer (DST): UTC+4:30 (IRDT)

Nowkand (Persian: نوكند; also known as Naukiād) is a village in Baqeran Rural District, in the Central District of Birjand County, South Khorasan Province, Iran. At the 2006 census, its population was 94, in 26 families.
