= Seyfabad-e Muqufeh =

Seyfabad-e Muqufeh سيف ابادموقوفه
- Village
- Location within Iran
- Coordinates: 29°07′52″N 57°30′14″E
- Country: Iran
- Province: Kerman
- County: Jiroft
- Bakhsh: Sarduiyeh
- Rural District: Gevar

Population (2006)
  - Total: 21
- Time zone: UTC+3:30 (IRST)
  - Summer (DST): UTC+4:30 (IRDT)

Seyfabad-e Muqufeh (Persian: سيف ابادموقوفه, also Romanized as Seyfābād-e Mūqūfeh; also known as Seyfābād) is a village in Gevar Rural District, Sarduiyeh District, Jiroft County, Kerman Province, Iran. At the 2006 census, its population was 21, in 6 families.
