= Nazarabad =

City in Alborz province, Iran

Nazarabad Persian: نظرآباد
- City
- Location within Iran
- Coordinates: 35°57′22″N 50°36′16″E
- Country: Iran
- Province: Alborz
- County: Nazarabad
- District: Central

Population (2016)
  - Total: 119,512
- Time zone: UTC+3:30 (IRST)

Nazarabad (Persian: نظرآباد; [næzæɾɒːˈbɒːd]) (Note: Also romanized as Naz̧arābād; also known as Naz̧arābād-e Bozorg and Naz̧arābād-e Moghadam) is a city in the Central District of Nazarabad County, Alborz province, Iran, serving as capital of both the county and the district. The city is well-known for growing fruit for Tehran.

== Demographics ==
=== Population ===
At the time of the 2006 National Census, the city's population was 97,684 in 24,583 households, when it was in Tehran province. In 2010, the county was separated from the province in the establishment of Alborz province. The 2016 census measured the population of the city as 119,512 inhabitants in 36,520 households.

== See also ==
Nazarabad travel guide from Wikivoyage
