= Nowkand, Sarbisheh =

Nowkand نوكند
- Village
- Interactive map of Nowkand
- Coordinates: 32.7821°N 59.5121°E
- Country: Iran
- Province: South Khorasan
- County: Sarbisheh
- Bakhsh: Mud
- Rural District: Mud

Population (2006)
  - Total: 163
- Time zone: UTC+3:30 (IRST)
  - Summer (DST): UTC+4:30 (IRDT)

Nowkand (Persian: نوكند) is a village in Mud Rural District, Mud District, Sarbisheh County, South Khorasan province, Iran. As of 2006 (census), its population was 163, in 44 families.
