= Seyfabad, Hormozgan =

Seyfabad سيف اباد
- Village
- Location within Iran
- Coordinates: 28°30′26″N 55°27′10″E
- Country: Iran
- Province: Hormozgan
- County: Hajjiabad
- Bakhsh: Central
- Rural District: Dar Agah

Population (2006)
  - Total: 59
- Time zone: UTC+3:30 (IRST)
  - Summer (DST): UTC+4:30 (IRDT)

Seyfabad (Persian: سيف اباد, also Romanized as Seyfābād) is a village in Dar Agah Rural District, in the Central District of Hajjiabad County, Hormozgan Province, Iran. At the 2006 census, its population was 59, in 13 families.
