= Seyfabad, Kazerun =

Seyfabad سيف اباد
- Village
- Location within Iran
- Coordinates: 29°31′06″N 51°42′18″E
- Country: Iran
- Province: Fars
- County: Kazerun
- Bakhsh: Central
- Rural District: Balyan

Population (2006)
  - Total: 2,004
- Time zone: UTC+3:30 (IRST)
  - Summer (DST): UTC+4:30 (IRDT)

Seyfabad (Persian: سيف اباد, also Romanized as Seyfābād; also known as Saifābād and Seyfābād-e Now) is a village in Balyan Rural District, in the Central District of Kazerun County, Fars province, Iran. At the 2006 census, its population was 2,004, in 441 families.
