= Seyfabad, Jiroft =

Seyfabad سيفاباد
- Village
- Location within Iran
- Coordinates: 29°06′54″N 57°31′11″E
- Country: Iran
- Province: Kerman
- County: Jiroft
- Bakhsh: Sarduiyeh
- Rural District: Gevar

Population (2006)
  - Total: 103
- Time zone: UTC+3:30 (IRST)
  - Summer (DST): UTC+4:30 (IRDT)

Seyfabad (Persian: سيفاباد, also romanized as Seyfābād) is a village in Gevar Rural District, Sarduiyeh District, Jiroft County, Kerman Province, Iran. At the 2006 census, its population was 103, in 29 families.
