= Seyfabad, Nishapur =

Seyfabad سيف اباد
- Village
- Location within Iran
- Coordinates: 36°14′12″N 58°43′53″E
- Country: Iran
- Province: Razavi Khorasan
- County: Nishapur
- Bakhsh: Central
- Rural District: Mazul

Population (2006)
  - Total: 91
- Time zone: UTC+3:30 (IRST)
  - Summer (DST): UTC+4:30 (IRDT)

Seyfabad (Persian: سيف اباد, also Romanized as Seyfābād) is a village in Mazul Rural District, in the Central District of Nishapur County, Razavi Khorasan Province, Iran. At the 2006 census, its population was 91, in 26 families.
