= Seyfabad, Bijar =

Seyfabad سيف آباد
- Village
- Location within Iran
- Coordinates: 35°38′39″N 47°51′57″E
- Country: Iran
- Province: Kurdistan
- County: Bijar
- Bakhsh: Chang Almas
- Rural District: Babarashani

Population (2006)
  - Total: 45
- Time zone: UTC+3:30 (IRST)
  - Summer (DST): UTC+4:30 (IRDT)

Seyfabad (Persian: سيف آباد, also Romanized as Seyfābād and Saifābād) is a village in Babarashani Rural District, Chang Almas District, Bijar County, Kurdistan Province, Iran. At the 2006 census, its population was 45, in 11 families. The village is populated by Kurds.
