= List of current Iran governors-general =

This is current list of Iranian provincial Governors General in the cabinet of Masoud Pezeshkian.

== List ==
Legend

Reformist (7)

Principlist (4)

Military (0)

Independent (20)

Iran governors-general
Province	image	Governor	Party	Prior public experience	Inauguration
Alborz		Mojtaba Abdollahi	Principlist	Executive Director	November 7, 2021
Ardabil		Masoud Emami Yeganeh	Independent	Executive Director	November 17, 2024
East Azerbaijan		Bahram Sarmast	Reformist	Executive Director	September 29, 2024
West Azerbaijan		Reza Rahmani	Independent	Executive Director and MP of Iran	December 4, 2024
Bushehr		Arsalan Zare	Independent	Executive Director	November 3, 2024
Chaharmahal and Bakhtiari		Jafar Mardani	Independent	Executive Director	November 6, 2024
Fars		Hossein-Ali Amiri	Independent	Executive Director	October 9, 2024
Gilan		Hadi Haghshenas	Reformist	Executive Director and MP of Iran	October 2, 2024
Golestan		Ali-Asghar Tahmasbi	Independent	Executive Director	November 17, 2024
Hamadan		Hamid Mollanouri Shamsi	Independent	Executive Director	September 29, 2024
Hormozgan		Mohammad Ashouri Taziani	Independent	Executive Director and MP of Iran	December 1, 2024
Ilam		Ahmad Karami	Independent	Executive Director	November 6, 2024
Isfahan		Mehdi Jamalinejad	Principlist	Executive Director	October 15, 2024
Kerman		Mohammad Ali Talebi	Independent	Executive Director	November 10, 2024
Kermanshah		Manouchehr Habibi	Independent	Executive Director	November 27, 2024
North Khorasan		Bahman Nouri	Independent	Executive Director	October 27, 2024
Razavi Khorasan		Gholam Hossein Mozaffari	Reformist	Executive Director and MP of Iran	October 9, 2024
South Khorasan		Mohammad-Reza Hashemi	Principlist	Executive Director	November 20, 2024
Khuzestan		Mohammad-Reza Mavalizadeh	Independent	Executive Director and MP of Iran	October 20, 2024
Kohgiluyeh and Boyer-Ahmad		Yadollah Rahmani	Reformist	Executive Director	September 18, 2024
Kurdistan		Arash Zarehtan Lahoni	Reformist	Executive Director and MP of Iran	September 18, 2024
Lorestan		Saeed Shahrokhi	Reformist	Executive Director	October 20, 2024
Markazi		Mahdi Zandiyeh Vakili	Independent	Executive Director	November 3, 2024
Mazandaran		Mehdi Younesi Rostami	Independent	Executive Director	November 24, 2024
Qazvin		Mohammad Nozari	Reformist	Executive Director	November 24, 2024
Qom		Akbar Behnamjoo	Independent	Executive Director	October 20, 2024
Semnan		Mohammad Javad Kolivand	Independent	Executive Director and MP of Iran	November 24, 2024
Sistan and Baluchestan		Mansour Bijar	Independent	Executive Director	October 30, 2024
Tehran		Mohammad-Sadegh Motamedian	Independent	Executive Director	October 20, 2024
Yazd		Mohammad-Reza Babaei	Principlist	Executive Director	October 9, 2024
Zanjan		Mohsen Sadeghi	Independent	Executive Director	November 20, 2024
