= Seyfabad-e Allah Yar =

Seyfabad-e Allah Yar سيف ابادالهيار
- Village
- Location within Iran
- Coordinates: 32°13′55″N 50°13′47″E
- Country: Iran
- Province: Chaharmahal and Bakhtiari
- County: Kuhrang
- Bakhsh: Bazoft
- Rural District: Doab

Population (2006)
  - Total: 42
- Time zone: UTC+3:30 (IRST)
  - Summer (DST): UTC+4:30 (IRDT)

Seyfabad-e Allah Yar (Persian: سيف ابادالهيار, also Romanized as Seyfābād-e Allāh Yār; also known as Seyfābād-e Allāh Yārī) is a village in Doab Rural District, Bazoft District, Kuhrang County, Chaharmahal and Bakhtiari Province, Iran. At the 2006 census, its population was 42, in 10 families. The village is populated by Lurs.
