= Saidabad Rural District (Savojbolagh County) =

Rural district in Alborz province, Iran

Saidabad Rural District Persian: دهستان سعیدآباد
- Rural District
- Location within Iran
- Coordinates: 35°54′N 50°43′E
- Country: Iran
- Province: Alborz
- County: Savojbolagh
- District: Central
- Established: 1987
- Capital: Saidabad

Population (2016)
  - Total: 26,979
- Time zone: UTC+3:30 (IRST)

Saidabad Rural District (Persian: دهستان سعیدآباد) is in the Central District of Savojbolagh County, Alborz province, Iran. Its capital is the village of Saidabad.

== Demographics ==
=== Population ===
At the time of the 2006 National Census, the rural district's population (as a part of Tehran province) was 31,576 in 7,946 households. The 2016 census measured the population of the rural district as 26,979 people in 8,125 households, by which time the county had been separated from the province in the establishment of Alborz province. The most populous of its 29 villages was Qasemabad-e Bozorg, with 6,142 people.

=== Other villages in the rural district ===
- Abbasabad-e Bozorg
- Abbasabad-e Kuchek
- Ahmadabad-e Etemad ol Dowleh
- Aran
- Derakhshaniyeh
- Esmailabad
- Eyqer Bolagh
- Hajjiabad
- Hoseynabad
- Hoseynabad-e Kushk Zar
- Kargalin
- Masudiyeh
- Namak Alan
- Qanbarabad
- Qarah Qobad
- Qasemabad-e Aqa
- Rezaabad-e Sufian
- Sherkat-e Chanieh
- Soltanabad-e Aran
- Sorkhab
