= Hashtgerd =

City in Alborz province, Iran

Hashtgerd Persian: هشتگرد
- City
- Hashtgerd

- Location within Iran
- Coordinates: 35°57′46″N 50°40′46″E
- Country: Iran
- Province: Alborz
- County: Savojbolagh
- District: Central

Government
  - Mayor: Payam Raisi
- Elevation: 1,175 m (3,855 ft)

Population (2016)
  - Total: 55,640
- Time zone: UTC+3:30 (IRST)

Hashtgerd (Persian: هشتگرد) (Note: Also known as Ashjird, Hashtjerd, and Hashtjird) is a city in the Central District of Savojbolagh County, Alborz province, Iran, serving as capital of both the county and the district. The city is 68 kilometres (42 mi) west of Tehran.

== Demographics ==
=== Population ===
At the time of the 2006 National Census, the city's population was 45,332 in 12,122 households, when it was in Tehran province. The 2016 census measured the population of the city as 55,640 in 17,203 households, by which time the county had been separated from the province in the establishment of Alborz province.

== Overview ==
Hashtgerd includes several nearby archeological mounds, known collectively as "Ozbaki." These sites, which have been actively excavated for several decades, include several mounds or Tepes, including Doshan Tapeh. Includes remains of ancient settlements dating back to the 7th millennium BC through 1400 BC. These settlements include those inhabited by "Grey earthenware" Aryans and the Medians.

A park called the Statue Park has been built in a green area across a valley in Hashtgerd. The park features 12 busts of notable Iranians.

Hashtgerd possesses an industrial city, the Hashtgerd International Studios, a hydroponic farming complex, a Center for Agricultural Research and Nuclear Medicine, and the Iranian Garden Museum. Hashtgerd is the last stop on Line 5, a suburban commuter line of Tehran's metro.

== See also ==
Media related to Hashtgerd at Wikimedia Commons
