= Najmabad Rural District =

Rural district in Alborz province Iran

Najmabad Rural District Persian: دهستان نجم آباد
- Rural District
- Location within Iran
- Coordinates: 35°52′N 50°31′E
- Country: Iran
- Province: Alborz
- County: Nazarabad
- District: Central
- Established: 1987
- Capital: Najmabad

Population (2016)
  - Total: 6,704
- Time zone: UTC+3:30 (IRST)

Najmabad Rural District (Persian: دهستان نجم آباد) is in the Central District of Nazarabad County, Alborz province, Iran. Its capital is the village of Najmabad.

== Demographics ==
=== Population ===
At the time of the 2006 National Census, the rural district's population was 8,880 in 2,178 households, when it was in Tankaman District of Tehran province. The rural district was separated from the district to join the Central District in 2008. In 2010, the county was separated from the province in the establishment of Alborz province. The 2016 census measured the population of the rural district as 6,704 people in 1,983 households. The most populous of its 18 villages was Sheykh Hasan, with 899 people.

=== Other villages in the rural district ===
- Fathabad
- Gol Darreh
- Khorramabad
- Khosrowabad
- Mohammadabad-e Afkham ol Dowleh
- Qebchaq
- Qeshlaq-e Mohammadlu
- Qezel Hesar
- Quch Hesar
- Vayeh Beyk
