= Tankaman-e Jonubi Rural District =

Rural district in Alborz province, Iran

Tankaman-e Jonubi Rural District Persian: دهستان تنکمان جنوبی
- Rural District
- Location within Iran
- Coordinates: 35°51′N 50°36′E
- Country: Iran
- Province: Alborz
- County: Nazarabad
- District: Tankaman
- Established: 1987
- Capital: Tankaman

Population (2016)
  - Total: 3,279
- Time zone: UTC+3:30 (IRST)

Tankaman-e Jonubi Rural District (Persian: دهستان تنکمان جنوبی) (Note: Formerly Tankaman Rural District (دهستان تنکمان)) is in Tankaman District of Nazarabad County, Alborz province, Iran. It is administered from the city of Tankaman.

== Demographics ==
=== Population ===
At the time of the 2006 National Census, the rural district's population (as Tankaman Rural District (Note: Renamed Tankaman-e Jonubi Rural District) of Tehran province) was 16,310 in 4,135 households. The rural district was renamed Tankaman-e Jonubi Rural District in 2008. In 2010, the county was separated from the province in the establishment of Alborz province. The 2016 census measured the population of the rural district as 3,279 people in 1,039 households. The most populous of its 22 villages was Mohammadabad, with 781 people.

=== Other villages in the rural district ===
- Abdolabad
- Ali Seyyed
- Dowlatabad
- Eqbaliyeh
- Karimabad
- Nosratabad
