= Central District (Nazarabad County) =

District in Alborz province, Iran

Central District (Nazarabad County) Persian: بخش مرکزی شهرستان نظرآباد
- District
- Location within Iran
- Coordinates: 35°54′N 50°29′E
- Country: Iran
- Province: Alborz
- County: Nazarabad
- Established: 2003
- Capital: Nazarabad

Population (2016)
  - Total: 133,712
- Time zone: UTC+3:30 (IRST)

The Central District of Nazarabad County (Persian: بخش مرکزی شهرستان نظرآباد) is in Alborz province, Iran. Its capital is the city of Nazarabad.

== History ==
In 2007, Jamal ol Din Rural District was created in the district, and Najmabad Rural District was separated from Tankaman District to join the Central District.

== Demographics ==
=== Population ===
At the time of the 2006 National Census, the district's population was 103,476 in 26,060 households. The 2016 census measured the population of the district as 133,712 people in 40,857 households.

=== Administrative divisions ===
Central District (Nazarabad County) Population (Note: As a part of Tehran province at the 2006 Census)
Administrative Divisions	2006	2016
Ahmadabad RD	5,792	6,053
Jamal ol Din RD		1,443
Najmabad RD (Note: Transferred from Tankaman District)		6,704
Nazarabad (city)	97,684	119,512
Total	103,476	133,712
RD = Rural District
