= Central District (Savojbolagh County) =

District in Alborz province, Iran

Central District (Savojbolagh County) Persian: بخش مرکزی شهرستان ساوجبلاغ
- District
- City of Hashtgerd

- Location within Iran
- Coordinates: 35°58′N 50°41′E
- Country: Iran
- Province: Alborz
- County: Savojbolagh
- Established: 1989
- Capital: Hashtgerd

Population (2016)
  - Total: 153,675
- Time zone: UTC+3:30 (IRST)

The Central District of Savojbolagh County (Persian: بخش مرکزی شهرستان ساوجبلاغ) is in Alborz province, Iran. Its capital is the city of Hashtgerd.

== History ==
In 2007, two villages merged to form the new city of Seyfabad, renamed Golsar in 2010. In 2010, the county was separated from Tehran province in the establishment of Alborz province. The city of Shahr-e Jadid-e Hashtgerd was renamed Mehestan in 2023.

== Demographics ==
=== Population ===
At the time of the 2006 National Census, the district's population (as a part of Tehran province) was 106,879 in 28,413 households. The 2016 census measured the population of the district as 153,675 in 47,980 households,

=== Administrative divisions ===
Central District Population (Note: As a part of Tehran province at the 2006 census)
Administrative Divisions	2006	2016
Hiv RD	14,352	15,164
Saidabad RD	31,576	26,979
Golsar (city) (Note: Merger of two villages as the city of Seyfabad, later renamed Golsar)		13,745
Hashtgerd (city)	45,332	55,640
Mehestan (city) (Note: Formerly Shahr-e Jadid-e Hashtgerd)	15,619	42,147
Total	106,879	153,675
RD = Rural District
