= Tankaman District =

District in Alborz province, Iran

Tankaman District Persian: بخش تنکمان
- District
- Location within Iran
- Coordinates: 35°52′N 50°37′E
- Country: Iran
- Province: Alborz
- County: Nazarabad
- Established: 2003
- Capital: Tankaman

Population (2016)
  - Total: 18,723
- Time zone: UTC+3:30 (IRST)

Tankaman District (Persian: بخش تنکمان) is in Nazarabad County, Alborz province, Iran. Its capital is the city of Tankaman.

== History ==
In 2007, Najmabad Rural District was separated from the district to join the Central District. Tankaman-e Shomali Rural District was created in Tankaman District, and the village of Tankaman was elevated to the status of a city.

In 2010, the county was separated from Tehran province in the establishment of Alborz province.

== Demographics ==
=== Population ===
At the time of the 2006 National Census, the district's population was 25,190, in 6,313 households. The 2016 census measured the population of the district as 18,723 people in 5,800 households.

=== Administrative divisions ===
Tankaman District Population (Note: As a part of Tehran province at the 2006 census)
Administrative Divisions	2006	2016
Najmabad RD (Note: Transferred to the Central District)	8,880	
Tankaman-e Jonubi RD (Note: Formerly Tankaman Rural District)	16,310	3,279
Tankaman-e Shomali RD		10,790
Tankaman (city)		4,654
Total	25,190	18,723
RD = Rural District
