= Nazarabad County =

County in Alborz province, Iran

Nazarabad County Persian: شهرستان نظرآباد
- County
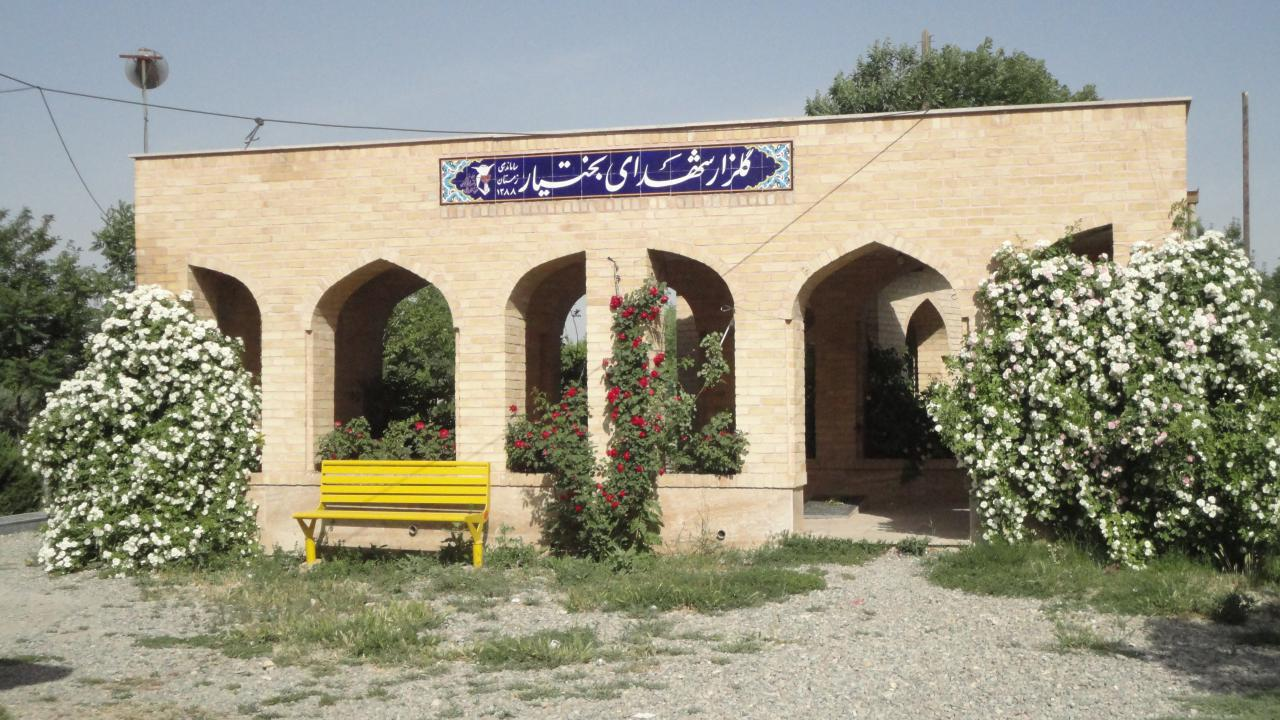
- Tomb of the Martyrs in Nazarabad

- Location of Nazarabad County in Alborz province (left, green)

- Location of Alborz province in Iran
- Coordinates: 35°56′N 50°33′E
- Country: Iran
- Province: Alborz
- Established: 2003
- Capital: Nazarabad
- Districts: Central, Tankaman

Area
  - Total: 612 km^{2} (236 sq mi)

Population (2016)
  - Total: 152,437
  - Density: 249/km^{2} (645/sq mi)
- Time zone: UTC+3:30 (IRST)

Nazarabad County (Persian: شهرستان نظرآباد) is in Alborz province, Iran. Its capital is the city of Nazarabad.

== History ==
In 2007, Jamal ol Din Rural District was created in the Central District, and Najmabad Rural District was separated from Tankaman District to join the Central District. Tankaman-e Shomali Rural District was created in Tankaman District, and the village of Tankaman was elevated to the status of a city.

In 2010, the county was separated from Tehran province in the establishment of Alborz province.

== Demographics ==
=== Population ===
At the time of the 2006 National Census, the county's population was 128,666 in 32,373 households. The 2016 census measured the population of the county as 152,437 in 46,658 households.

=== Administrative divisions ===
Nazarabad County's population history and administrative structure over two censuses are shown in the following table.

Nazarabad County Population (Note: As a part of Tehran province at the 2006 Census)
Administrative Divisions	2006	2016
Central District	103,476	133,712
Ahmadabad RD	5,792	6,053
Jamal ol Din RD		1,443
Najmabad RD		6,704
Nazarabad (city)	97,684	119,512
Tankaman District	25,190	18,723
Najmabad RD	8,880	
Tankaman-e Jonubi RD (Note: Formerly Tankaman Rural District)	16,310	3,279
Tankaman-e Shomali RD		10,790
Tankaman (city)		4,654
Total	128,666	152,437
RD = Rural District

== See also ==
Media related to Nazarabad County at Wikimedia Commons
