= Alborz province =

Province of Iran

Alborz Province استان البرز (Persian)
- Province
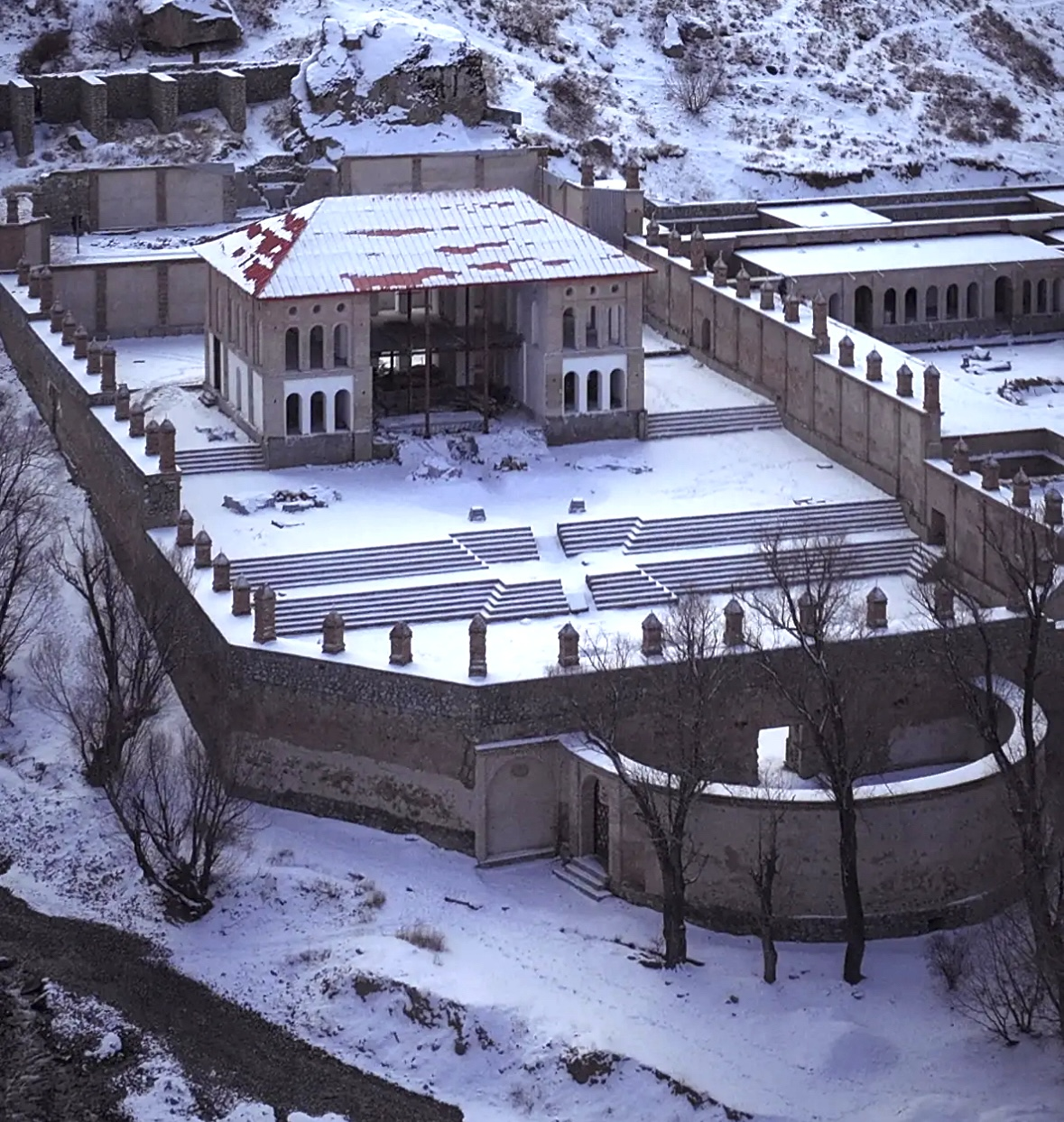
- The Naseri Palace in Shahrestanak, Alborz, a major cultural tourism hub in the province.

- Location of Alborz province within Iran
- Coordinates: 35°56′N 50°54′E
- Country: Iran
- Region: Region 1
- Established: 2010
- Capital: Karaj
- Counties: 7

Government
  - Governor-general: Mojtaba Abdollahi (Principlist)

Area
  - Total: 5,833 km^{2} (2,252 sq mi)

Population (2016)
  - Total: 2,712,400
  - Density: 465.0/km^{2} (1,204/sq mi)
- Time zone: UTC+03:30 (IRST)
- Main language(s): Persian

Alborz province (Persian: استان البرز) (Note: Also romanized as Ostān-e Alborz) is one of the 31 provinces of Iran. Its capital is the city of Karaj, which lies 40 km west of Tehran, at the foothills of the Alborz mountains. Alborz is Iran's smallest province in area.

== History ==
In 2010, Karaj, Nazarabad, and Savojbolagh Counties were separated from Tehran Province with the establishment of Alborz Province.

== Demographics ==
=== Ethnicity ===
The majority of the population of Alborz identifies as ethnic Persians.

=== Population ===
At the time of the 2006 National Census, the counties that were later to form the province had a total population of 2,053,233. The first census after the creation of Alborz Province counted 2,412,513 people in 2011. The 2016 census measured the population of the province as 2,712,400 people.

=== Administrative divisions ===

The population history and structural changes of Alborz Province's administrative divisions over two censuses are shown in the following table.

Alborz Province (Note: As a part of Tehran province at the 2006 census)
Counties	2006	2016
Chaharbagh (Note: Separated from Savojbolagh County after the 2016 census)	—	—
Eshtehard (Note: Separated from Karaj County after the 2011 census)	—	37,876
Fardis (Note: Separated from Karaj County after the 2011 census)	—	271,829
Karaj	1,709,481	1,973,470
Nazarabad	128,666	152,437
Savojbolagh	215,086	259,973
Taleqan (Note: Separated from Savojbolagh County after the 2006 census)	—	16,815
Total	2,053,233	2,712,400

=== Cities ===
According to the 2016 census, 2,512,737 people (over 92% of the population of Alborz province) live in the following cities:

City	Population
Asara	1,339
Chaharbagh	48,828
Eshtehard	29,993
Fardis	181,174
Garmdarreh	22,726
Golsar	13,745
Hashtgerd	55,640
Kamal Shahr	141,669
Karaj	1,592,492
Kuhsar	10,940
Mahdasht	62,910
Mehestan	42,147
Meshkin Dasht	62,005
Mohammadshahr	119,418
Nazarabad	119,512
Taleqan	3,545
Tankaman	4,654

== Transportation ==
- Metro: Tehran Metro is connected to Karaj through Line 5 (dark green). There are three metro stations in the province: Karaj, Mohammadshahr, and Golshahr. The other line from Golshahr to Hashtgerd is 25 kilometers long and has a capacity of 250,000 passengers daily.
- Train: All trains that connect Tehran with the western parts of Iran and those that go to Turkey pass through Karaj, and most of them stop at the Karaj Railway Station.
- Bus: Karaj is on Freeway 2, which connects Tehran and Tabriz.
- Shared Taxi: Several shared taxi (savari) stations offer the possibility of going from Tehran to different parts of Alborz Province. The stations are located in Vanak, Tajrish, Enghelab, and Azadi. Their fares vary from 40,000 to 50,000 rials, depending on the routes.

== See also ==
Media related to Alborz Province at Wikimedia Commons

Alborz (province) travel guide from Wikivoyage

Media related to Alborz Province at Wikimedia Commons
