= Rezaabad =

Rezaabad (Persian: رضااباد) may refer to:

== Alborz Province ==
- Rezaabad, Alborz, a village in Nazarabad County, Alborz Province, Iran
- Rezaabad-e Sufian, a village in Savojbolagh County, Alborz Province, Iran

== Ardabil Province ==
- Tazeh Kand-e Rezaabad, a village in Ardabil County

== Fars Province ==
- Rezaabad, Eqlid, a village in Eqlid County
- Rezaabad, Kazerun, a village in Kazerun County
- Rezaabad, Naqsh-e Rostam, a village in Marvdasht County

== Golestan Province ==
- Rezaabad, Golestan, a village in Ramian County

== Ilam Province ==
- Rezaabad, Ilam, a village in Ilam County, Ilam Province, Iran

== Kerman Province ==
- Rezaabad, Anar, a village in Anar County
- Rezaabad, Mashiz, a village in Bardsir County
- Rezaabad 1, a village in Kahnuj County
- Rezaabad, Kerman, a village in Kerman County
- Rezaabad, Ekhtiarabad, a village in Kerman County
- Rezaabad, Azadegan, a village in Rafsanjan County
- Rezaabad, Khenaman, a village in Rafsanjan County
- Rezaabad, Rudbar-e Jonubi, a village in Rudbar-e Jonubi County

== Khuzestan Province ==
- Rezaabad, Khuzestan, a village in Masjed Soleyman County

== Kurdistan Province ==
- Rezaabad, Kurdistan, a village in Bijar County

== Lorestan Province ==
- Rezaabad, Borujerd, a village in the Central District of Borujerd County
- Rezaabad, Oshtorinan, a village in Oshtorinan District, Borujerd County
- Rezaabad, Delfan, a village in Delfan County
- Rezaabad, Khorramabad, a village in Khorramabad County
- Rezaabad, Doab, a village in Selseleh County
- Rezaabad, Yusefvand, a village in Selseleh County
- Rezaabad-e Mian Volan, a village in Selseleh County
- Rezaabad-e Reza Veys, a village in Delfan County

== Markazi Province ==
- Rezaabad, Khomeyn, a village in Khomeyn County
- Rezaabad, Saveh, a village in Saveh County
- Rezaabad, Shazand, a village in Shazand County

== Mazandaran Province ==
- Rezaabad, Mazandaran, a village in Savadkuh County

== North Khorasan Province ==
- Rezaabad, Howmeh, a village in Shirvan County
- Rezaabad, Ziarat, a village in Shirvan County

== Razavi Khorasan Province ==
- Rezaabad-e Sarhang, a village in Chenaran County
- Rezaabad-e Taheri, a village in Chenaran County
- Rezaabad-e Gijan Samedi, a village in Chenaran County
- Rezaabad-e Sharqi, a village in Quchan County
- Rezaabad, Razavi Khorasan, a village in Torbat-e Jam County

== Semnan Province ==
- Rezaabad, Semnan, a village in Shahrud County

== Yazd Province ==
- Rezaabad, Khatam, a village in Khatam County
- Rezaabad, Mehriz, a village in Mehriz County

== Zanjan Province ==
- Rezaabad, Zanjan, a village in Zanjan County

== See also ==
- Raziabad (disambiguation)
- Rizaabad (disambiguation)
