= Raziabad =

Raziabad (Persian: رضي اباد) may refer to:

- Raziabad, Ardabil
- Raziabad, Hamadan
- Raziabad, Jiroft, Kerman Province
- Raziabad, Sarduiyeh, Jiroft County, Kerman Province
- Raziabad, Lorestan
- Raziabad, Markazi
- Raziabad, Shazand, Markazi Province
- Raziabad, Qazvin
- Raziabad, Damghan, Semnan Province
- Raziabad, Tehran
- Raziabad-e Bala, Tehran Province
- Raziabad-e Pain, Tehran Province

== See also ==
- Rezaabad (disambiguation)
- Rizaabad (disambiguation)
