= Zarnan-e Bala =

Village in Tehran province, Iran

Zarnan-e Bala Persian: زرنان بالا
- Village
- Location within Iran
- Coordinates: 35°41′05″N 51°09′09″E
- Country: Iran
- Province: Tehran
- County: Qods
- District: Central
- Rural District: Danesh

Population (2016)
  - Total: 256
- Time zone: UTC+3:30 (IRST)

Zarnan-e Bala (Persian: زرنان بالا) (Note: Also romanized as Zarnān-e Bālā; also known as Qal‘eh-ye Bālā-ye Zarnān) is a village in Danesh Rural District of the Central District in Qods County, Tehran province, Iran.

== Demographics ==
=== Population ===
The village did not appear in the 2006 National Census, when it was in the former Qods District of Shahriar County. The village again did not appear in the following census of 2011, by which time the district had been separated from the county in the establishment of Qods County. The rural district was transferred to the new Central District. The 2016 census measured the population of the village as 256 people in 76 households.
