= Haft Juy =

Village in Tehran province, Iran

Haft Juy Persian: هفت جوی
- Village
- Location within Iran
- Coordinates: 35°43′56″N 51°01′49″E
- Country: Iran
- Province: Tehran
- County: Qods
- District: Central
- Rural District: Haft Juy

Population (2016)
  - Total: 3,137
- Time zone: UTC+3:30 (IRST)

Haft Juy (Persian: هفت جوی) (Note: Also romanized as Haft Jūi and Haft Jūy; also known as Haft Jūb) is a village in, and the capital of, Haft Juy Rural District in the Central District of Qods County, Tehran province, Iran.

== Demographics ==
=== Population ===
At the time of the 2006 National Census, the village's population was 2,924 in 799 households, when it was in the former Qods District of Shahriar County. The following census in 2011 counted 2,789 people in 865 households, by which time the district had been separated from the county in the establishment of Qods County. The rural district was transferred to the new Central District. The 2016 census measured the population of the village as 3,137 people in 950 households. It was the most populous village in its rural district.
