= Zarnan-e Pain =

Village in Tehran province, Iran

Zarnan-e Pain Persian: زرنان پايين
- Village
- Location within Iran
- Coordinates: 35°40′22″N 51°09′34″E
- Country: Iran
- Province: Tehran
- County: Qods
- District: Central
- Rural District: Danesh

Population (2016)
  - Total: 224
- Time zone: UTC+3:30 (IRST)

Zarnan-e Pain (Persian: زرنان پايين) (Note: Also romanized as Zarnān-e Pā’īn; also known as Qal‘eh-ye Pā’īn-e Zarnān and Zarnan, also romanized as Zarnān) is a village in Danesh Rural District of the Central District in Qods County, Tehran province, Iran.

== Demographics ==
=== Population ===
At the time of the 2006 National Census, the village's population was 562 in 155 households, when it was listed as Zarnan in the former Qods District of Shahriar County. The following census in 2011 counted 227 people in 67 households, by which time the district had been separated from the county in the establishment of Qods County. The rural district was transferred to the new Central District. The 2016 census measured the population of the village, listed as Zarnan-e Pain, at 224 people in 70 households.
