= Ebrahimabad, Shahriar =

Village in Tehran province, Iran

Ebrahimabad Persian: ابراهيم اباد
- Village
- Location within Iran
- Coordinates: 35°38′41″N 51°01′53″E
- Country: Iran
- Province: Tehran
- County: Shahriar
- District: Juqin
- Rural District: Ferdows

Population (2016)
  - Total: 1,354
- Time zone: UTC+3:30 (IRST)

Ebrahimabad (Persian: ابراهيم اباد) (Note: Also romanized as Ebrāhīmābād) is a village in Ferdows Rural District of Juqin District in Shahriar County, Tehran province, Iran.

== Demographics ==
=== Population ===
At the time of the 2006 National Census, the village's population was 1,488 in 398 households, when it was in the Central District. The following census in 2011 counted 1,586 people in 445 households. The 2016 census measured the population of the village as 1,354 people in 410 households.

In 2018, the rural district was separated from the district in the formation of Juqin District.
