= Kardzar =

Village in Tehran province, Iran

Kardzar Persian: كردزار
- Village
- Location within Iran
- Coordinates: 35°38′21″N 51°00′52″E
- Country: Iran
- Province: Tehran
- County: Shahriar
- District: Juqin
- Rural District: Ferdows

Population (2016)
  - Total: 4,594
- Time zone: UTC+3:30 (IRST)

Kardzar (Persian: كردزار) (Note: Also romanized as Kardzār and Kord Zār) is a village in Ferdows Rural District of Juqin District in Shahriar County, Tehran province, Iran.

== Demographics ==
=== Population ===
At the time of the 2006 National Census, the village's population was 3,110 in 815 households, when it was in the Central District. The following census in 2011 counted 3,290 people in 926 households. The 2016 census measured the population of the village as 4,594 people in 1,416 households.

In 2018, the rural district was separated from the district in the formation of Juqin District.
