= Yusefabad-e Seyrafi =

Village in Tehran province, Iran

Yusefabad-e Seyrafi Persian: يوسف اباد صيرفي
- Village
- Location within Iran
- Coordinates: 35°34′53″N 51°03′09″E
- Country: Iran
- Province: Tehran
- County: Shahriar
- District: Juqin
- Rural District: Ferdows

Population (2016)
  - Total: 5,308
- Time zone: UTC+3:30 (IRST)

Yusefabad-e Seyrafi (Persian: يوسف ابادصيرفي) (Note: Also romanized as Yūsefābād-e Şeyrafī; also known as Yūsefābād) is a village in Ferdows Rural District of Juqin District in Shahriar County, Tehran province, Iran.

Yousef Abad Seyrafi takes its name from the Seyrafi family of magnates who owned Yousef Abad and nearby Shahriar. They are credited with giving away lands to the Ministry of Post and Telegraph to bring communications infrastructure to the town. Yousef Abad Seyrafi was the site of a fortress that has been destroyed.

== Demographics ==
=== Population ===
At the time of the 2006 National Census, the village's population was 2,023 in 499 households, when it was in the Central District. The following census in 2011 counted 2,351 people in 664 households. The 2016 census measured the population of the village as 5,308 people in 1,658 households. It was the most populous village in its rural district.

In 2018, the rural district was separated from the district in the formation of Juqin District.
