= Vastar, Iran =

Village in Tehran province, Iran

Vastar Persian: وسطر
- Village
- Location within Iran
- Coordinates: 35°34′59″N 51°03′43″E
- Country: Iran
- Province: Tehran
- County: Shahriar
- District: Juqin
- Rural District: Ferdows

Population (2016)
  - Total: 168
- Time zone: UTC+3:30 (IRST)

Vastar (Persian: وسطر) is a village in Ferdows Rural District of Juqin District in Shahriar County, Tehran province, Iran.

== Demographics ==
=== Population ===
At the time of the 2006 National Census, the village's population was 70 in 17 households, when it was in the Central District. The following census in 2011 counted 84 people in 20 households. The 2016 census measured the population of the village as 168 people in 53 households.

In 2018, the rural district was separated from the district in the formation of Juqin District.
