= Razmareh =

Village in Tehran province, Iran

Razmareh Persian: رازمره
- Village
- Location within Iran
- Coordinates: 35°33′59″N 51°03′13″E
- Country: Iran
- Province: Tehran
- County: Shahriar
- District: Juqin
- Rural District: Ferdows

Population (2016)
  - Total: 24
- Time zone: UTC+3:30 (IRST)

Razmareh (Persian: رازمره) (Note: Also romanized as Rāzmareh) is a village in Ferdows Rural District of Juqin District in Shahriar County, Tehran province, Iran.

== Demographics ==
=== Population ===
At the time of the 2006 National Census, the village's population was 34 in seven households, when it was in the Central District. The following census in 2011 counted 16 people in four households. The 2016 census measured the population of the village as 24 people in six households.

In 2018, the rural district was separated from the district in the formation of Juqin District.
