= Nosratabad, Tehran =

Village in Tehran province, Iran

Nosratabad Persian: نصرت اباد
- Village
- Location within Iran
- Country: Iran
- Province: Tehran
- County: Shahriar
- District: Juqin
- Rural District: Ferdows

Population (2016)
  - Total: 47
- Time zone: UTC+3:30 (IRST)

Nosratabad (Persian: نصرت اباد) (Note: Also romanized as Noşratābād) is a village in Ferdows Rural District of Juqin District in Shahriar County, Tehran province, Iran.

== Demographics ==
=== Population ===
At the time of the 2006 National Census, the village's population was 55 in 16 households, when it was in the Central District. The following census in 2011 counted 71 people in 23 households. The 2016 census measured the population of the village as 47 people in 17 households.

In 2018, the rural district was separated from the district in the formation of Juqin District.
