= Asilabad =

Village in Tehran province, Iran

Asilabad Persian: اصيل اباد
- Village
- Location within Iran
- Coordinates: 35°34′15″N 51°01′11″E
- Country: Iran
- Province: Tehran
- County: Shahriar
- District: Juqin
- Rural District: Juqin

Population (2016)
  - Total: 4,113
- Time zone: UTC+3:30 (IRST)

Asilabad (Persian: اصيل اباد) (Note: Also romanized as Aşīlābād; also known as Aslābād) is a village in Juqin Rural District of Juqin District in Shahriar County, Tehran province, Iran.

== Demographics ==
=== Population ===
At the time of the 2006 National Census, the village's population was 4,579 in 1,167 households, when it was in the Central District. The following census in 2011 counted 4,401 people in 1,262 households. The 2016 census measured the population of the village as 4,113 people in 1,319 households.

In 2018, the rural district was separated from the district in the formation of Juqin District.
