= Bokeh, Iran =

Village in Tehran province, Iran

Bokeh Persian: بكه
- Village
- Location within Iran
- Coordinates: 35°35′53″N 50°59′38″E
- Country: Iran
- Province: Tehran
- County: Shahriar
- District: Juqin
- Rural District: Juqin

Population (2016)
  - Total: 2,377
- Time zone: UTC+3:30 (IRST)

Bokeh (Persian: بکه) (Note: Also known as Bowkeh) is a village in Juqin Rural District of Juqin District in Shahriar County, Tehran province, Iran.

== Demographics ==
=== Population ===
At the time of the 2006 National Census, the village's population was 2,367 in 581 households, when it was in the Central District. The following census in 2011 counted 3,237 people in 923 households. The 2016 census measured the population of the village as 2,377 people in 666 households.

In 2018, the rural district was separated from the district in the formation of Juqin District.
