= Fararat =

Village in Tehran province, Iran

Fararat Persian: فرارت
- Village
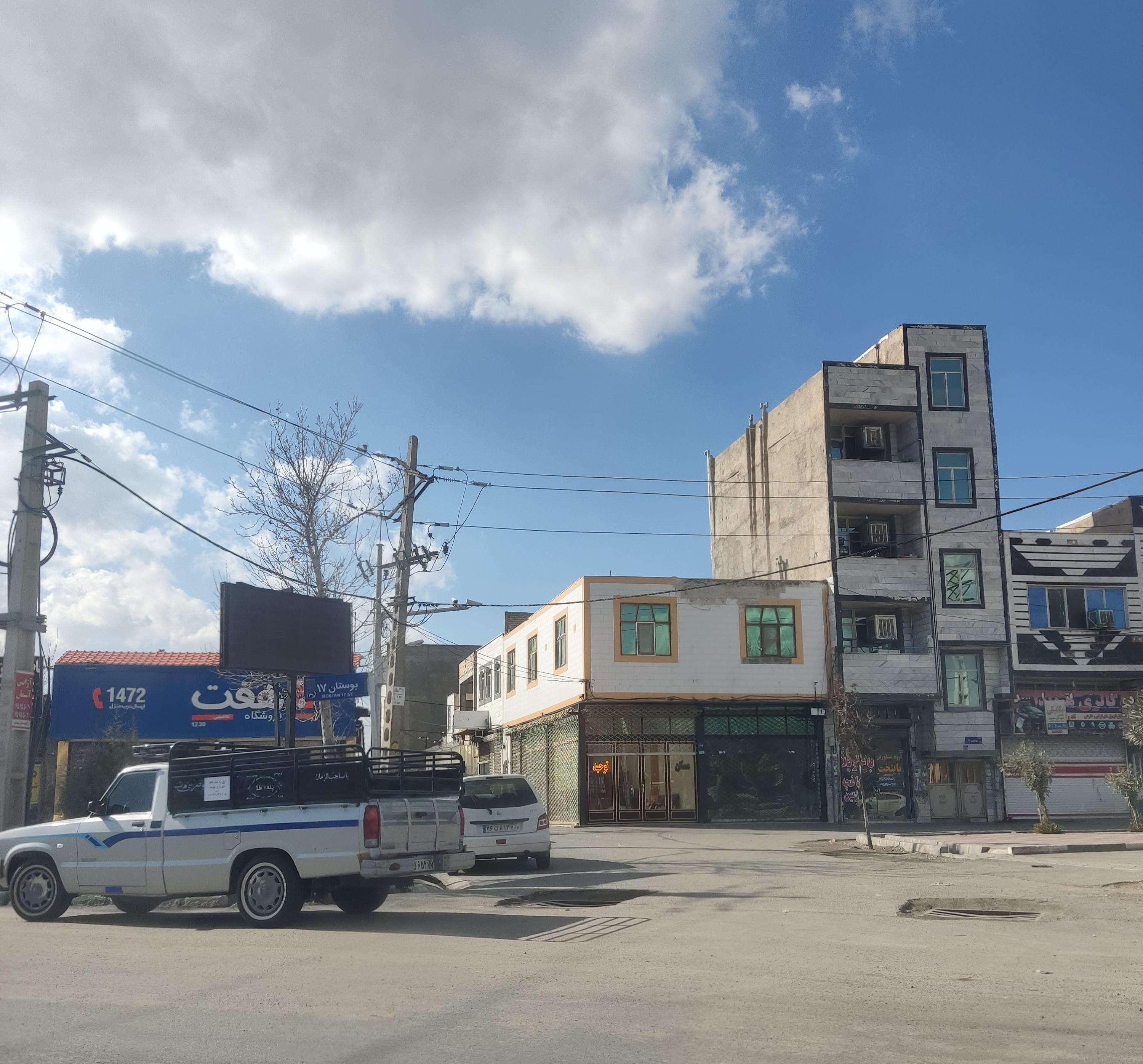
- The village of Fararat

- Location within Iran
- Coordinates: 35°34′34″N 51°01′31″E
- Country: Iran
- Province: Tehran
- County: Shahriar
- District: Juqin
- Rural District: Juqin

Population (2016)
  - Total: 4,856
- Time zone: UTC+3:30 (IRST)

Fararat (Persian: فرارت) (Note: Also romanized as Farārat) is a village in Juqin Rural District of Juqin District in Shahriar County, Tehran province, Iran.

== Demographics ==
=== Population ===
At the time of the 2006 National Census, the village's population was 4,916 in 1,234 households, when it was in the Central District. The following census in 2011 counted 5,240 people in 1,457 households. The 2016 census measured the population of the village as 4,856 people in 1,439 households. It was the most populous village in its rural district.

In 2018, the rural district was separated from the district in the formation of Juqin District.
