= Rizaabad =

Rizaabad (Persian: ريضااباد) may refer to:

- Rizaabad, Fars
- Rizaabad, Markazi
- Rizaabad, North Khorasan
- Rizaabad, Qazvin

== See also ==
- Raziabad (disambiguation)
- Rezaabad (disambiguation)
