= Shahrak-e Danesh, Tehran =

Village in Tehran province, Iran

Shahrak-e Danesh Persian: شهرك دانش
- Village
- Location within Iran
- Coordinates: 35°41′41″N 51°10′55″E
- Country: Iran
- Province: Tehran
- County: Qods
- District: Central
- Rural District: Danesh

Population (2016)
  - Total: 3,402
- Time zone: UTC+3:30 (IRST)

Shahrak-e Danesh (Persian: شهرك دانش) (Note: Also romanized as Shahrak-e Dānesh; also known as Dānesh, Shādābād, and Shāhābād) is a village in, and the capital of, Danesh Rural District in the Central District of Qods County, Tehran province, Iran.

== Demographics ==
=== Population ===
At the time of the 2006 National Census, the village's population was 4,228 in 1,067 households, when it was in the former Qods District of Shahriar County. The following census in 2011 counted 3,905 people in 1,144 households, by which time the district had been separated from the county in the establishment of Qods County. The rural district was transferred to the new Central District. The 2016 census measured the population of the village as 3,402 people in 1,050 households. It was the most populous village in its rural district.
