= Hesar-e Sati =

Village in Tehran province, Iran

Hesar-e Sati Persian: حصارساتي
- Village
- Location within Iran
- Coordinates: 35°33′40″N 50°58′38″E
- Country: Iran
- Province: Tehran
- County: Shahriar
- District: Juqin
- Rural District: Juqin

Population (2016)
  - Total: 1,058
- Time zone: UTC+3:30 (IRST)

Hesar-e Sati (Persian: حصارساتي) (Note: Also romanized as Ḩeşār Sātī, Ḩeşār-e Sātī, and Hesār-e-Sātī; also known as Hisār Sathi) is a village in Juqin Rural District of Juqin District in Shahriar County, Tehran province, Iran.

== Demographics ==
=== Population ===
At the time of the 2006 National Census, the village's population was 1,052 in 276 households, when it was in the Central District. The following census in 2011 counted 1,046 people in 293 households. The 2016 census measured the population of the village as 1,058 people in 328 households.

In 2018, the rural district was separated from the district in the formation of Juqin District.
