= Qajar-e Takht Rostam =

Qajar-e Takht Rostam قجرتخت رستم
- Village
- Location within Iran
- Coordinates: 35°34′35″N 50°57′05″E
- Country: Iran
- Province: Tehran
- County: Shahriar
- Bakhsh: Central
- Rural District: Juqin

Population (2006)
  - Total: 390
- Time zone: UTC+3:30 (IRST)
  - Summer (DST): UTC+4:30 (IRDT)

Qajar-e Takht Rostam (Persian: قجرتخت رستم; also known as Qajar, Deh-e Qajar, Qajar-e Khāleşeh, and Qājārīyeh) is a village in Juqin Rural District, in the Central District of Shahriar County, Tehran Province, Iran. At the 2006 census, its population was 390, in 86 families.
