= Kord Amir =

Village in Tehran province, Iran

Kord Amir Persian: كردامير
- Village
- Location within Iran
- Coordinates: 35°37′16″N 51°00′29″E
- Country: Iran
- Province: Tehran
- County: Shahriar
- District: Juqin
- Rural District: Juqin

Population (2016)
  - Total: 2,132
- Time zone: UTC+3:30 (IRST)

Kord Amir (Persian: كردامير) (Note: Also romanized as Kard Amīr and Kord Amīr; also known as Kurd Amīr; Turkish: Kürd Emir) is a village in Juqin Rural District of Juqin District in Shahriar County, Tehran Province, Iran.

== Demographics ==
=== Population ===
At the time of the 2006 National Census, the village's population was 2,038 in 511 households, when it was in the Central District. The following census in 2011 counted 1,898 people in 532 households. The 2016 census measured the population of the village as 2,132 people in 675 households.

In 2018, the rural district was separated from the district in the formation of Juqin District.
