= Yabarak =

Village in Tehran province, Iran

Yabarak Persian: یبارک
- Village
- Location within Iran
- Coordinates: 35°37′09″N 50°59′40″E
- Country: Iran
- Province: Tehran
- County: Shahriar
- District: Juqin
- Rural District: Juqin

Population (2016)
  - Total: 2,478
- Time zone: UTC+3:30 (IRST)

Yabarak (Persian: یبارک) (Note: Also romanized as Yabārak) is a village in Juqin Rural District of Juqin District in Shahriar County, Tehran province, Iran.

== Demographics ==
=== Population ===
At the time of the 2006 National Census, the village's population was 2,556 in 646 households, when it was in the Central District. The following census in 2011 counted 2,239 people in 663 households. The 2016 census measured the population of the village as 2,478 people in 750 households.

In 2018, the rural district was separated from the district in the formation of Juqin District.
