= Danesh =

Danesh may refer to:

- Danish (name) (or Danesh)
- Shahrak-e Danesh, Tehran
- Danesh Rural District
- Danesh (women's magazine)
- Danesh (scientific magazine)
