= Qajarabad =

Village in Tehran province, Iran

Qajarabad Persian: قجراباد
- Village
- Location within Iran
- Coordinates: 35°37′10″N 50°59′04″E
- Country: Iran
- Province: Tehran
- County: Shahriar
- District: Juqin
- Rural District: Juqin

Population (2016)
  - Total: 860
- Time zone: UTC+3:30 (IRST)

Qajarabad (Persian: قجراباد) (Note: Also romanized as Qajarābād) is a village in Juqin Rural District of Juqin District in Shahriar County, Tehran province, Iran.

== Demographics ==
=== Population ===
At the time of the 2006 National Census, the village's population was 1,104 in 301 households, when it was in the Central District. The following census in 2011 counted 1,175 people in 332 households. The 2016 census measured the population of the village as 860 people in 269 households.

In 2018, the rural district was separated from the district in the formation of Juqin District.
