= Qeshlaq-e Mehrchin =

Qeshlaq-e Mehrchin قشلاق مهرچين
- Village
- Location within Iran
- Coordinates: 35°35′14″N 50°57′57″E
- Country: Iran
- Province: Tehran
- County: Shahriar
- Bakhsh: Central
- Rural District: Juqin

Population (2006)
  - Total: 140
- Time zone: UTC+3:30 (IRST)
  - Summer (DST): UTC+4:30 (IRDT)

Qeshlaq-e Mehrchin (Persian: قشلاق مهرچين, also Romanized as Qeshlāq-e Mehrchīn; also known as Qeshlāq) is a village in Juqin Rural District, in the Central District of Shahriar County, Tehran Province, Iran. At the 2006 census, its population was 140, in 29 families.
