= Eskaman =

Village in Tehran province, Iran

Eskaman Persian: اسكمان
- Village
- Location within Iran
- Coordinates: 35°36′41″N 51°07′00″E
- Country: Iran
- Province: Tehran
- County: Shahriar
- District: Central
- Rural District: Razakan

Population (2016)
  - Total: 2,143
- Time zone: UTC+3:30 (IRST)

Eskaman (Persian: اسكمان) (Note: Also romanized as Eskamān; also known as Esgamān and Eskamūn) is a village in Razakan Rural District of the Central District in Shahriar County, Tehran province, Iran.

== Demographics ==
=== Population ===
At the time of the 2006 National Census, the village's population was 1,679 in 416 households. The following census in 2011 counted 1,935 people in 506 households. The 2016 census measured the population of the village as 2,143 people in 598 households.
