= Qarah Tappeh, Tehran =

Village in Tehran province, Iran

Qarah Tappeh Persian: قره تپه
- Village
- Location within Iran
- Coordinates: 35°38′54″N 51°05′31″E
- Country: Iran
- Province: Tehran
- County: Shahriar
- District: Central
- Rural District: Razakan

Population (2016)
  - Total: 44
- Time zone: UTC+3:30 (IRST)

Qarah Tappeh (Persian: قره تپه) is a village in Razakan Rural District of the Central District in Shahriar County, Tehran province, Iran.

== Demographics ==
=== Population ===
At the time of the 2006 National Census, the village's population was 265 in 61 households. The following census in 2011 counted 208 people in 52 households. The 2016 census measured the population of the village as 44 people in 18 households.
