= Badamak, Tehran =

Village in Tehran province, Iran

Badamak Persian: بادامك
- Village
- Location within Iran
- Coordinates: 35°38′28″N 51°09′54″E
- Country: Iran
- Province: Tehran
- County: Shahriar
- District: Central
- Rural District: Maviz

Population (2016)
  - Total: 352
- Time zone: UTC+3:30 (IRST)

Badamak (Persian: بادامك) (Note: Also romanized as Bādāmak) is a village in Maviz Rural District of the Central District in Shahriar County, Tehran province, Iran.

== Demographics ==
=== Population ===
At the time of the 2006 National Census, the village's population was 491 in 124 households. The following census in 2011 counted 384 people in 109 households. The 2016 census measured the population of the village as 352 people in 115 households.
