= Batri Sazi Nur =

Village in Tehran province, Iran

Batri Sazi Nur Persian: باطري سازي نور
- Village
- Country: Iran
- Province: Tehran
- County: Shahriar
- District: Central
- Rural District: Qaemabad

Population (2016)
  - Total: 953
- Time zone: UTC+3:30 (IRST)

Batri Sazi Nur (Persian: باطري سازي نور) (Note: Also romanized as Bāṭrī Sāzī Nūr) is a village in Qaemabad Rural District of the Central District in Shahriar County, Tehran province, Iran.

== Demographics ==
=== Population ===
At the time of the 2006 National Census, the village's population was 1,961 in 526 households. The following census in 2011 counted 1,650 people in 463 households. The 2016 census measured the population of the village as 953 people in 273 households.
