= Saidabad, Shahriar =

Village in Tehran province, Iran

Saidabad Persian: سعيدآباد
- Village
- Location within Iran
- Coordinates: 35°40′04″N 51°11′14″E
- Country: Iran
- Province: Tehran
- County: Shahriar
- District: Central
- Rural District: Saidabad

Population (2016)
  - Total: 16,212
- Time zone: UTC+3:30 (IRST)

Saidabad (Persian: شهرک سعیدآباد) (Note: Also romanized as Sa‘īdābād) is a village in Saidabad Rural District of the Central District in Shahriar County, Tehran province, Iran.

== Demographics ==
=== Population ===
At the time of the 2006 National Census, the village's population was 13,215 in 3,401 households. The following census in 2011 counted 14,519 people in 4,087 households. The 2016 census measured the population of the village as 16,212 people in 4,796 households. It was the most populous village in its rural district.
