= Razakan =

Village in Tehran province, Iran

Razakan Persian: رزكان
- Village
- Location within Iran
- Coordinates: 35°37′34″N 51°06′02″E
- Country: Iran
- Province: Tehran
- County: Shahriar
- District: Central
- Rural District: Razakan

Population (2016)
  - Total: 5,460
- Time zone: UTC+3:30 (IRST)

Razakan (Persian: رزكان) (Note: Also romanized as Razaḵān) is a village in, and the capital of, Razakan Rural District in the Central District of Shahriar County, Tehran province, Iran.

== Demographics ==
=== Population ===
At the time of the 2006 National Census, the village's population was 5,675 in 1,452 households. The following census in 2011 counted 5,661 people in 1,537 households. The 2016 census measured the population of the village as 5,460 people in 1,596 households. It was the most populous village in its rural district.
