= Saqarchin, Tehran =

Village in Tehran province, Iran

Saqarchin Persian: سقرچين
- Village
- Location within Iran
- Coordinates: 35°34′11″N 51°00′34″E
- Country: Iran
- Province: Tehran
- County: Shahriar
- District: Juqin
- Rural District: Juqin

Population (2016)
  - Total: 952
- Time zone: UTC+3:30 (IRST)

Saqarchin (Persian: سقرچين) (Note: Also romanized as Saqarchīn) is a village in Juqin Rural District of Juqin District in Shahriar County, Tehran province, Iran.

== Demographics ==
=== Population ===
At the time of the 2006 National Census, the village's population was 704 in 183 households, when it was in the Central District. The following census in 2011 counted 859 people in 244 households. The 2016 census measured the population of the village as 952 people in 279 households.

In 2018, the rural district was separated from the district in the formation of Juqin District.
