= Ramin, Tehran =

Village in Tehran province, Iran

Ramin Persian: رامين
- Village
- Location within Iran
- Coordinates: 35°34′37″N 51°03′40″E
- Country: Iran
- Province: Tehran
- County: Shahriar
- District: Juqin
- Rural District: Ferdows

Population (2016)
  - Total: 508
- Time zone: UTC+3:30 (IRST)

Ramin (Persian: رامين) (Note: Also romanized as Rāmīn) is a village in Ferdows Rural District of Juqin District in Shahriar County, Tehran province, Iran.

== Demographics ==
=== Population ===
At the time of the 2006 National Census, the village's population was 589 in 163 households, when it was in the Central District. The following census in 2011 counted 643 people in 197 households. The 2016 census measured the population of the village as 508 people in 164 households.

In 2018, the rural district was separated from the district in the formation of Juqin District.
