= Varaminak =

Village in Tehran province, Iran

Varaminak Persian: ورامینک
- Village
- Location within Iran
- Country: Iran
- Province: Tehran
- County: Shahriar
- District: Central
- Rural District: Saidabad

Population (2016)
  - Total: Below reporting threshold
- Time zone: UTC+3:30 (IRST)

Varaminak (Persian: ورامینک) (Note: Also romanized as Varāmīnaḵ) is a village in Saidabad Rural District of the Central District in Shahriar County, Tehran province, Iran.

== Demographics ==
=== Population ===
At the time of the 2006 National Census, the village's population was 23 in 11 households. The following census in 2011 counted seven people in four households. The 2016 census measured the population of the village as below the reporting threshold.
