= Kereshteh =

Kereshteh کرشته
- city
- Location within Iran
- Coordinates: 35°59′56″N 51°06′05″E
- Country: Iran
- Province: Tehran
- County: Shahriar
- Bakhsh: Central

Population
  - Total: 20,000
- Time zone: UTC+3:30 (IRST)
  - Summer (DST): UTC+4:30 (IRDT)

Kereshteh (Persian: کرشته), is a city in the Central District of Shahriar County, Tehran Province, Iran. As of the 2006 census, its population was 20,000.

Kereshteh is beside the main road to Tehran. The Hadi Shrine (the descendants of Imam Hasan) and a memorial of martyrs is there.

== Economy ==
The main business of the area is agriculture, and there are many mining companies established in the northern part of the district.
