= Mahmudabad-e Khalajabad =

Village in Tehran province, Iran

Mahmudabad-e Khalajabad Persian: محمود اباد خلج اباد
- Village
- Location within Iran
- Coordinates: 35°33′50″N 51°06′08″E
- Country: Iran
- Province: Tehran
- County: Shahriar
- District: Central
- Rural District: Qaemabad

Population (2016)
  - Total: 2,433
- Time zone: UTC+3:30 (IRST)

Mahmudabad-e Khalajabad (Persian: محمودابادخلج اباد) (Note: Also romanized as Maḩmūdābād-e Khalajābād) is a village in Qaemabad Rural District of the Central District in Shahriar County, Tehran province, Iran.

== Demographics ==
=== Population ===
At the time of the 2006 National Census, the village's population was 2,596 in 656 households. The following census in 2011 counted 2,250 people in 602 households. The 2016 census measured the population of the village as 2,433 people in 727 households. It was the most populous village in its rural district.
