= Qaleh Baha =

Village in Tehran province, Iran

Qaleh Baha Persian: قلعه بها
- Village
- Location within Iran
- Coordinates: 35°40′13″N 51°05′34″E
- Country: Iran
- Province: Tehran
- County: Shahriar
- District: Central
- Rural District: Maviz

Population (2016)
  - Total: 571
- Time zone: UTC+3:30 (IRST)

Qaleh Baha (Persian: قلعه بها) (Note: Also romanized as Qal‘eh Baha’; also known as Qal‘eh Bahār-e Pā'īn) is a village in Maviz Rural District of the Central District in Shahriar County, Tehran province, Iran.

== Demographics ==
=== Population ===
At the time of the 2006 National Census, the village's population was 651 in 171 households. The following census in 2011 counted 713 people in 200 households. The 2016 census measured the population of the village as 571 people in 172 households.
