= Deh Shad =

Deh Shad (Persian: دهشاد) may refer to:

- Deh Shad-e Bala
- Deh Shad-e Pain
