= Dinarabad, Shahriar =

Village in Tehran province, Iran

Dinarabad Persian: دينارآباد
- Village
- Location within Iran
- Coordinates: 35°38′13″N 51°04′49″E
- Country: Iran
- Province: Tehran
- County: Shahriar
- District: Central

Population (2016)
  - Total: 4,969
- Time zone: UTC+3:30 (IRST)

Dinarabad or Shahrak-e Namaz (also Romanized as Dīnārābād) Dinarabad is an affluent district in the Shahriar County, Tehran Province, Iran.

== Demographics ==
=== Population ===
At the time of the 2006 National Census, the village's population was 5,109 in 1,229 households. The following census in 2011 counted 5,301 people in 1,417 households. The 2016 census measured the population of the village as 4,969 people in 1,429 households.
