= Alvard =

Village in Tehran province, Iran

Alvard Persian: الورد
- Village
- Location within Iran
- Coordinates: 35°36′06″N 51°07′58″E
- Country: Iran
- Province: Tehran
- County: Shahriar
- District: Central
- Rural District: Razakan

Population (2016)
  - Total: 1,475
- Time zone: UTC+3:30 (IRST)

Alvard (Persian: الورد) is a village in Razakan Rural District of the Central District in Shahriar County, Tehran province, Iran.

== Demographics ==
=== Population ===
At the time of the 2006 National Census, the village's population was 1,434 in 355 households. The following census in 2011 counted 1,405 people in 333 households. The 2016 census measured the population of the village as 1,475 people in 383 households.
