= Raziabad-e Pain =

Village in Tehran province, Iran

Raziabad-e Pain Persian: رضي ابادپائين
- Village
- Location within Iran
- Coordinates: 35°39′09″N 51°05′00″E
- Country: Iran
- Province: Tehran
- County: Shahriar
- District: Central
- Rural District: Razakan

Population (2016)
  - Total: 1,704
- Time zone: UTC+3:30 (IRST)

Raziabad-e Pain (Persian: رضي ابادپائين) (Note: Also romanized as Raẕīābād Pā’īn and Raẕīābād-e Pā’īn) is a village in Razakan Rural District of the Central District in Shahriar County, Tehran province, Iran.

== Demographics ==
=== Population ===
At the time of the 2006 National Census, the village's population was 1,940 in 500 households. The following census in 2011 counted 1,677 people in 471 households. The 2016 census measured the population of the village as 1,704 people in 540 households.
