= Kaldet til Islam =

The call to Islam
- Kaldet til Islam
- The black flag of Jihad often used by Kaldet til Islam in its demonstrations
- Founder: Shiraz Tariq (Abu Musa)
- Spokesperson: Yaqoub Ali (Abu Ubaydillah
- Founded: 2009
- Dates active: 2010s
- Country: Denmark
- Active regions: Greater Copenhagen
- Ideology: Salafi jihadism

Kaldet til Islam ("The call to Islam") was a Salafi-jihadist organization based in Denmark. Based primarily in Copenhagen, the group became known for its public preaching activities, advocacy of strict interpretation of Islam, criticism of secular democracy and its public support for Islamic terrorism.

The organization attracted media and political attention in Denmark for campaigns promoting the implementation of Islamic law, its links to international Islamist networks, and the involvement of some members in the Syrian civil war. Researchers and journalists have described Kaldet til Islam as part of a broader European Salafist movement that maintained ideological connections to the British al-Muhajiroun network associated with Omar Bakri Muhammad and Anjem Choudary.

== History ==
=== Emergence ===
The group was founded in Denmark in 2009 by Shiraz Tariq, also known as Abu Musa. The organization emerged within Denmark's Salafi environment and focused on public preaching, activism, and ideological outreach.

The group appears to have drawn inspiration from the British Islamist network Islam4UK. Danish media and terrorism researchers frequently described Kaldet til Islam as the Danish counterpart of these organizations.

=== Public activities and campaigns ===
Kaldet til Islam gained national attention through a series of public preaching campaigns, demonstrations, and controversial political initiatives during the early 2010s. The group regularly conducted da'wah activities in public spaces and sought to promote a strict interpretation of Islam among Danish Muslims. It also organized lectures and demonstrations addressing issues such as blasphemy, Western foreign policy, and the role of Islam in Danish society.

One of the organization's most publicized campaigns occurred in October 2011, when it announced plans to establish so called "sharia-zones" in Denmark. Inspired by similar initiatives undertaken by Islamist activists in the United Kingdom, members stated that they intended to patrol the Copenhagen neighborhood of Tingbjerg around the clock and encourage residents to refrain from activities considered un-Islamic, including alcohol consumption, gambling and attendance at nightclubs. Representatives further stated that the initiatives would later be expanded to Nørrebro and eventually other parts of Denmark. The action attracted widespread criticism from politicians, Muslim organizations, and commentators, who viewed it as an attempt to challenge Danish law and social norms.

The campaign was primarily associated with Abu Ahmed, a preacher linked to the organization. According to contemporary reports, Kaldet til Islam presented the sharia-zone initiative as part of a broader effort to encourage Muslims to follow Islamic norms in everyday life. Muslimernes Fællesråd and emphasized that the group represented only a small minority of Danish Muslims.

Kaldet til Islam also organized demonstrations concerning perceived insults to Islam and support for Islamist causes abroad. In September 2012 that organization held a demonstration at the Kongens Nytorv in Copenhagen at which imprisoned Islamist preacher Omar Bakri Muhammad addressed participants by telephone. During the event Bakri condemned depictions of the Islamic prophet Muhammad and repeated calls for punishment of those who insult Islam. The demonstration generated significant controversy and intensified public scrutiny of the group's connections to foreign Islamist networks.

=== Syrian Civil War involvement ===
The outbreak of the Syrian civil war in 2011 became a significant turning point for Kaldet til Islam. As the conflict evolved into a major destination for foreign Islamist volunteers, several members of the organization traveled from Denmark to Syria to participate in the war. The conflict increasingly became a focus of the group's public statements and activities, and Kaldet til Islam was frequently mentioned in Danish media coverage concerning Danish foreign fighters.

Among the most prominent members to travel to Syria was the organization's founder and leader, Shiraz Tariq (Abu Musa). After leaving Denmark, Tariq joined insurgent forces fighting against the government of Syrian president Bashar al-Assad. In 2013, reports emerged that he had been killed in combat near Aleppo. His death received considerable attention in Denmark and was widely viewed as symbolic of the growing involvement of Danish Islamists in the Syrian conflict.

The departure of Tariq and other activists occurred during a period in which Denmark experienced one of the highest per-capita rates of foreign fighter mobilization in Western Europe. Researchers and security analysts identified Kaldet til Islam as part of the broader Salafi-jihadist environment from which a number of Danish volunteers emerged. Although the exact number of members who traveled to Syria remains unclear, the organization became closely associated in public debate with the phenomenon of Danish foreign fighters.

As the conflict continued, several individuals linked to Kaldet til Islam expressed support for Islamist factions operating in Syria. The organization's representatives frequently portrayed the war as a legitimate struggle to defend Syrian Muslims from the Assad government. Public statements by members emphasized solidarity with Islamist rebels and encouraged support for Muslims participating in the conflict. As the Syrian insurgency split internally, some Danish foreign fighters associated with the broader milieu surrounding Kaldet til Islam were reported to have joined or expressed support for the Islamic State, while others aligned with different jihadist organizations. The Syrian civil war also contributed to increased scrutiny of the organization by Danish authorities, journalists, and researchers. Security officials and counter-extremism experts cited the group as part of the radical Islamist environment that had facilitated the mobilization of Danish volunteers to Syria.

In later interviews, former member and spokesman Yaqoub Ali, also formerly known as Abu Ubaydillah acknowledged that numerous individuals within his social and ideological circles had traveled to Syria. Such statements reinforced public perception of Kaldet til Islam as one of the most visible Islamist organizations associated with European foreign-fighter phenomenon of the early Syrian Civil War period.

=== Decline ===
Kaldet til Islam experienced a significant decline during the mid-2010s. The organizations activities diminished following the outbreak of the Syrian civil war and the spread of the Islamic State, as several members and associates traveled to Syria and other conflict zones. The death of founder and leader Shiraz Tariq in 2013 deprived the group of its most prominent public figure and contributed in its visibility.

At the same time, Danish authorities increased their focus on radical Islamist networks and foreign-fighter recruitment. Public attention increasingly shifted the group's domestic campaigns such as its street preaching and demonstrations, to concerns about Danish citizens participating in conflicts in Syria and Iraq.

During this period, parts of Denmark's radical Islamist environment reorganized around new networks and initiatives. Journalists and researchers noted overlap between Kaldet til Islam and the Danish branch of Millatu Ibrahim, a pro-IS movement inspired by the banned German organization of the same name. A number of activists previously associated with Kaldet til Islam became involved in Millatu Ibrahim Denmark, which promoted similar opposition to democracy and support for governance based on Islamic law. While sources differ regarding the precise relationship between the two organizations, the emergence of Millatu Ibrahim coincided with Kaldet til Islam's declining public presence.

By the late 2010s, Kaldet til Islam had largely ceased its public activities. Although no formal announcement of the dissolution appears to be made, the group of generally regarded as having become inactive as of the 2020s.

The legacy of Kaldet til Islam has primarily been discussed in connection with the development of Salafi and jihadist networks in Denmark and Europe, particularly its role within the broader Islamist milieu from which a number of foreign fighters emerged during the Syrian civil war.

== Ideology ==
Kaldet til Islam adhered to a Salafi Islamist interpretation of Sunni Islam and advocated a return to what it regarded as the beliefs and practices of the salaf, the earliest generations of Muslims. The organization promoted a literalist understanding of Islamic scripture, argued that contemporary Muslim societies had deviated from authentic Islamic teachings, and advocated for the establishment of a caliphate.

== Membership ==
=== Notable members ===
- Shiraz Tariq (Abu Musa): Danish Pakistani Islamist activist who grew up in Avedøre, Denmark and founded Kaldet til Islam. He served as the organization's principal leader and public representative during its early years. following the outbreak of the Syrian civil war, Tariq traveled to Syria to participate in the conflict and was reported killed near Aleppo in 2013.
- Yaqoub Ali (Abu Ubaydillah): Born in Iraq, but grew up Frederikssund, he joined Kaldet til Islam in the 2010s and became its public spokesman. He frequently appeared in Danish media discussing the organization-s views on sharia, democracy, Danish society and the Syrian civil war. He was notable for publicly voicing support for Osama Bin Laden and the Islamic State. Charged with threatening a Syrian man for supporting Bashar al-Assad and for supporting terrorism. Later left the radical Islamist environment.
- Musharraf Sahid (Abu Khattab): Danish Pakistani Islamist activist who lived in Brønshøj. Central figure within Kaldet til Islam, later traveled to Syria with Shiraz Tariq in 2012. Reported killed in late 2013.
