= Raziabad-e Bala =

Village in Tehran province, Iran

Raziabad-e Bala Persian: رضي ابادبالا
- Village
- Location within Iran
- Coordinates: 35°41′03″N 51°04′17″E
- Country: Iran
- Province: Tehran
- County: Shahriar
- District: Central
- Rural District: Razakan

Population (2016)
  - Total: 5,111
- Time zone: UTC+3:30 (IRST)

Raziabad-e Bala (Persian: رضي ابادبالا) (Note: Also romanized as Raẕīābād Bālā and Raẕīābād-e Bālā; also known as Raẕīābād) is a village in Razakan Rural District of the Central District in Shahriar County, Tehran province, Iran.

== Demographics ==
=== Population ===
At the time of the 2006 National Census, the village's population was 5,137 in 1,256 households. The following census in 2011 counted 5,501 people in 1,543 households. The 2016 census measured the population of the village as 5,111 people in 1,532 households.
