= Deh Shad-e Bala =

Village in Tehran province, Iran

Deh Shad-e Bala Persian: دهشادبالا
- Village
- Location within Iran
- Coordinates: 35°36′36″N 51°08′07″E
- Country: Iran
- Province: Tehran
- County: Shahriar
- District: Central
- Rural District: Razakan

Population (2016)
  - Total: 3,651
- Time zone: UTC+3:30 (IRST)

Deh Shad-e Bala (Persian: دهشادبالا) (Note: Also romanized as Deh Shād-e Bālā; also known as Deh Shāh, Deh Shāh-e Bālā, and Deh Shāhī Bālā) is a village in Razakan Rural District of the Central District in Shahriar County, Tehran province, Iran.

== Demographics ==
=== Population ===
At the time of the 2006 National Census, the village's population was 3,065 in 760 households. The following census in 2011 counted 3,575 people in 954 households. The 2016 census measured the population of the village as 3,651 people in 1,023 households.
