= Halvard =

Halvard or Hallvard is a Norwegian given name. Notable people with the name include:

- Halvard Angaard (1898–1967), Norwegian sport shooter
- Halvard Bjørkvik (born 1924), Norwegian historian
- Jens-Halvard Bratz (1920–2005), Norwegian businessman and politician for the Conservative Party
- Hallvard Flatland (born 1957), Norwegian television presenter
- Halvard Grude Forfang (1914–1987), Norwegian educator
- Saint Halvard (1020–1043), Norwegian patron saint of Oslo
- Halvard Hanevold (1969–2019), Norwegian biathlete
- Halvard Ingebrigtsen (born 1970), Norwegian politician for the Labour Party
- Halvard Kausland (born 1945), Norwegian jazz guitarist and civil servant
- Halvard Lange (1902–1970), Norwegian diplomat, politician and statesman
- Halvard Olsen (1886–1966), Norwegian politician and trade Union leader
- JH Prynne (1936-2026), British Poet

== See also ==
- St. Halvard Bryggeri
- Alvard
- Halva
- Halvad
