= Deh Shad-e Pain =

Village in Tehran province, Iran

Deh Shad-e Pain Persian: دهشادپائين
- Village
- Location within Iran
- Coordinates: 35°35′38″N 51°09′14″E
- Country: Iran
- Province: Tehran
- County: Shahriar
- District: Central
- Rural District: Razakan

Population (2016)
  - Total: 1,291
- Time zone: UTC+3:30 (IRST)

Deh Shad-e Pain (Persian: دهشادپائين) (Note: Also romanized as Deh Shād-e Pā’īn; also known as Deh Shāh-e Pā’īn, Deh Shāhī Pā’īn, and Qal‘eh-ye Pā’īn Deh Shāh) is a village in Razakan Rural District of the Central District in Shahriar County, Tehran province, Iran.

== Demographics ==
=== Population ===
At the time of the 2006 National Census, the village's population was 1,091 in 264 households. The following census in 2011 counted 1,157 people in 309 households. The 2016 census measured the population of the village as 1,291 people in 357 households.
