= Danish Pakistani =

Danish Pakistani or Pakistani Danish may refer to:

- Denmark-Pakistan relations (cf. "a Danish-Pakistani treaty")
- A danish pastry manufactured in Pakistan or by Pakistanis
- Any Pakistani desserts which might be described by analogy to the danish pastry
- Pakistanis in Denmark
- Danes in Pakistan
- Mixed race individuals of Danish and Pakistani descent
- Multiple citizenship of Denmark and Pakistan
- Pakistanis with the name Danish:
  - Ihsan Danish, Pakistani poet
  - Noon Meem Danish, Pakistani poet
  - Danish Kaneria, Pakistani cricketer
