= Ramin, Iran =

Ramin (Persian: رامين) in Iran may refer to:

- Ramin, Khuzestan
- Ramin, Tehran
- Ramin, Zanjan
