= Saqarchin =

Saqarchin or Seqerchin (Persian: سقرچين) may refer to:

- Saqarchin, Tehran
- Seqerchin, Zanjan
