= Razakan Rural District =

Rural district in Tehran province, Iran

Razakan Rural District Persian: دهستان رزكان
- Rural District
- Location within Iran
- Coordinates: 35°38′N 51°06′E
- Country: Iran
- Province: Tehran
- County: Shahriar
- District: Central
- Established: 1987
- Capital: Razakan

Population (2016)
  - Total: 26,004
- Time zone: UTC+3:30 (IRST)

Razakan Rural District (Persian: دهستان رزكان) is in the Central District of Shahriar County, Tehran province, Iran. Its capital is the village of Razakan.

== Demographics ==
=== Population ===
At the time of the 2006 National Census, the rural district's population was 25,395 in 6,293 households. There were 26,420 inhabitants in 7,122 households at the following census of 2011. The 2016 census measured the population of the rural district as 26,004 in 7,517 households. The most populous of its 11 villages was Razakan, with 5,460 people.

=== Other villages in the rural district ===
- Alvard
- Deh Shad-e Bala
- Deh Shad-e Pain
- Dinarabad
- Eskaman
- Qarah Tappeh
- Raziabad-e Bala
- Raziabad-e Pain
