= Qods, Iran =

City in Tehran province, Iran

Qods Persian: قدس
- City
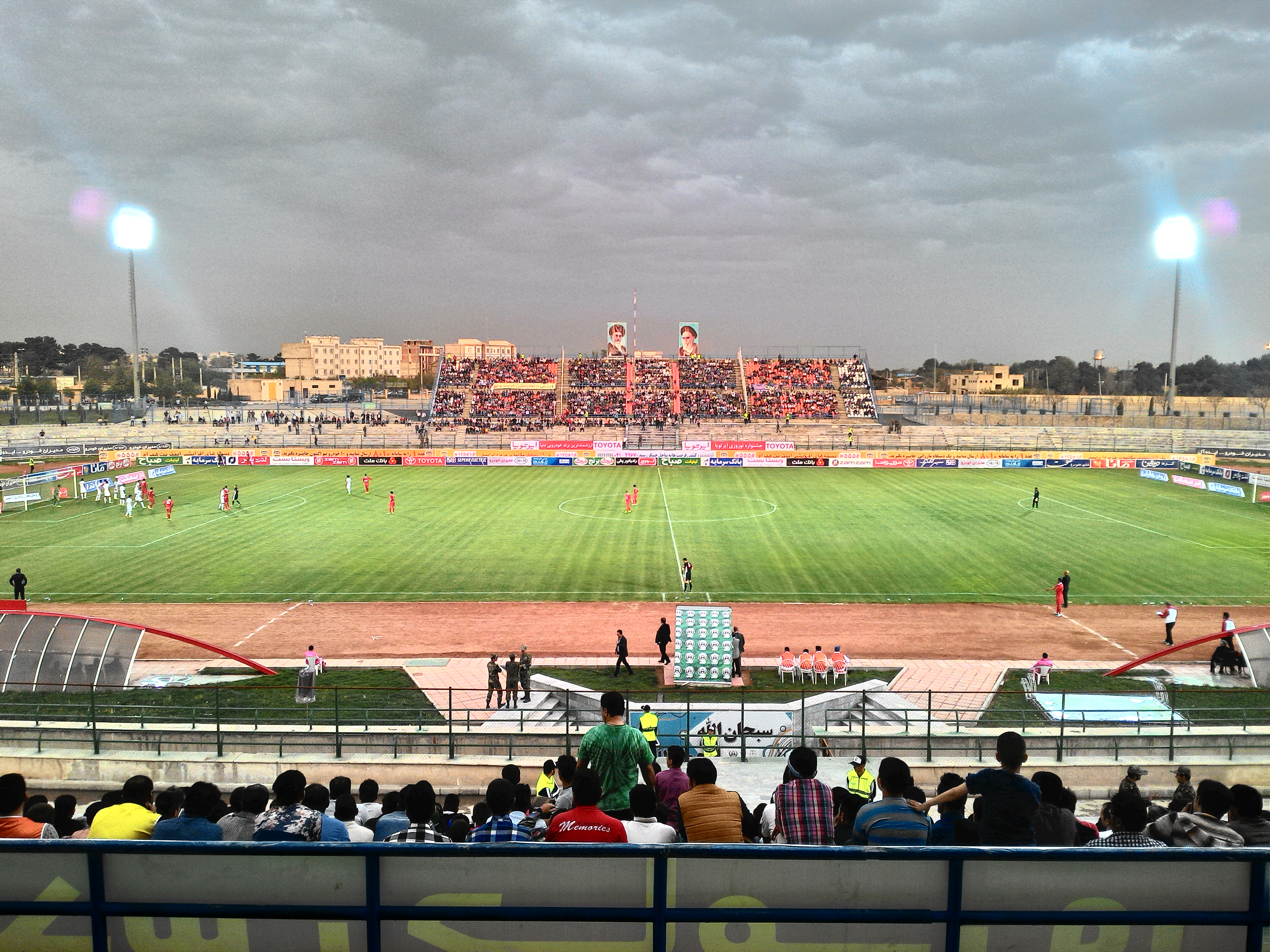
- Shahr-e Qods Stadium

- Location within Iran
- Coordinates: 35°42′37″N 51°06′47″E
- Country: Iran
- Province: Tehran
- County: Qods
- District: Central

Population (2016)
  - Total: 309,605
- Time zone: UTC+3:30 (IRST)

Qods (Persian: قدس) (Note: Also known as Shahr-e Qods ("City of Qods"); formerly Karaj, Qal‘eh Hasan, and Qal‘eh-ye Ḩasan Khān. Before Qods officially became a municipality in 1989, it was named Qal‘eh Hasan. The city is named after Jerusalem, in Arabic spelling) is a city in the Central District of Qods County, Tehran province, Iran, serving as capital of both the county and the district.

== Demographics ==
=== Population ===
At the time of the 2006 National Census, the city's population was 229,354 in 60,331 households, when it was capital of the former Qods District of Shahriar County. The following census in 2011 counted 283,517 people in 83,035 households, by which time the district had been separated from the county in the establishment of Qods County. Qods was transferred to the new Central District as the county's capital. The 2016 census measured the population of the city as 309,605 people in 94,532 households.

== Higher education ==
The city has three universities: Islamic Azad University, Shahr-eQods Branch, University of Applied Science and Technology, Shahr-e-Qods Branch and Payam-e-Nour University.

== Sports ==
The Persian Gulf Pro League team Paykan plays in the city at Shahre Qods Stadium.

== See also ==
Media related to Qods, Iran at Wikimedia Commons
