= Ziarat, North Khorasan =

City in North Khorasan province, Iran

Ziarat Persian: زيارت
- City
- Location within Iran
- Coordinates: 37°26′33″N 57°53′22″E
- Country: Iran
- Province: North Khorasan
- County: Shirvan
- District: Central
- Established: 2013

Population (2016)
  - Total: 4,179
- Time zone: UTC+3:30 (IRST)

Ziarat (Persian: زيارت) (Note: Also romanized as Zeyārat, Zīārat, and Zīyārat) is a city in the Central District of Shirvan County, North Khorasan province, Iran, serving as the administrative center for Ziarat Rural District.

== Demographics ==
=== Population ===
At the time of the 2006 National Census, Ziarat's population was 4,202 in 1,013 households, when it was a village in Ziarat Rural District. The following census in 2011 counted 4,650 people in 1,262 households. The 2016 census measured the population as 4,179 people in 1,254 households, by which time Ziarat had been converted to a city.
