= Eslamabad-e Karkhaneh-ye Qand =

Village in North Khorasan province, Iran

Eslamabad-e Karkhaneh-ye Qand Persian: اسلام ابادكارخانه قند
- Village
- Location within Iran
- Coordinates: 37°26′26″N 57°46′46″E
- Country: Iran
- Province: North Khorasan
- County: Shirvan
- District: Central
- Rural District: Ziarat

Population (2016)
  - Total: 1,138
- Time zone: UTC+3:30 (IRST)

Eslamabad-e Karkhaneh-ye Qand (Persian: اسلام ابادكارخانه قند) (Note: Also romanized as Eslāmābād-e Kārkhāneh-ye Qand) is a village in Ziarat Rural District of the Central District in Shirvan County, North Khorasan province, Iran.

== Demographics ==
=== Population ===
At the time of the 2006 National Census, the village's population was 1,325 in 308 households. The following census in 2011 counted 1,499 people in 367 households. The 2016 census measured the population of the village as 1,138 people in 319 households.
