= Ferdows Rural District (Shahriar County) =

Rural district in Tehran province, Iran

Ferdows Rural District Persian: دهستان فردوس
- Rural District
- Location within Iran
- Coordinates: 35°35′N 51°04′E
- Country: Iran
- Province: Tehran
- County: Shahriar
- District: Juqin
- Established: 1987
- Capital: Ferdowsiyeh

Population (2016)
  - Total: 12,003
- Time zone: UTC+3:30 (IRST)

Ferdows Rural District (Persian: دهستان فردوس) is in Juqin District of Shahriar County, Tehran province, Iran. It is administered from the city of Ferdowsiyeh.

== Demographics ==
=== Population ===
At the time of the 2006 National Census, the rural district's population (as a part of the Central District) was 15,225 in 3,848 households. There were 8,041 inhabitants in 2,279 households at the following census of 2011. The 2016 census measured the population of the rural district as 12,003 in 3,724 households. The most populous of its seven villages was Yusefabad-e Seyrafi, with 5,308 people.

In 2018, the rural district was separated from the district in the formation of Juqin District.

=== Other villages in the rural district ===
- Ebrahimabad
- Kardzar
- Nosratabad
- Ramin
- Razmareh
- Vastar
