= Ferdowsiyeh, Shahriar =

City in Tehran province, Iran

Ferdowsiyeh Persian: فردوسيه
- City
- Location within Iran
- Coordinates: 35°36′02″N 51°03′48″E
- Country: Iran
- Province: Tehran
- County: Shahriar
- District: Juqin
- Established as a city: 2000

Population (2016)
  - Total: 34,221
- Time zone: UTC+3:30 (IRST)

Ferdowsiyeh (Persian: فردوسيه) (Note: Also romanized as Ferdowsieh and Ferdowsīeh; formerly Ferdows) is a city in Juqin District of Shahriar County, Tehran province, Iran, serving as the administrative center for Ferdows Rural District. In 2000, the villages of Ferdows (فردوس), Abdabad (عبدآباد), Khaveh (خاوه), and Abbasabad-e Ferdows (عباس آباد فردوس) were merged to form the city of Ferdowsiyeh.

== Demographics ==
=== Population ===
At the time of the 2006 National Census, the city's population was 20,854 in 5,435 households, when it was in the Central District. The following census in 2011 counted 24,508 people in 6,940 households. The 2016 census measured the population of the city as 34,221 people in 10,290 households.

In 2018, the city was separated from the district in the formation of Juqin District.
