= Sabashahr =

City in Tehran province, Iran

Sabashahr Persian: صباشهر
- City
- Location within Iran
- Coordinates: 35°34′54″N 51°06′43″E
- Country: Iran
- Province: Tehran
- County: Shahriar
- District: Central
- Established as a city: 1996

Population (2016)
  - Total: 53,971
- Time zone: UTC+3:30 (IRST)

Sabashahr (Persian: صباشهر) (Note: Also romanized as Sabāshahr; formerly Qāsemābād) is a city in the Central District of Shahriar County, Tehran province, Iran. The city is the merger of several villages, including Qaemabad (قائم‌آباد), the former capital of Qaemabad Rural District. Other villages merged to form Sabashahr were Kabudin (کبودین), Qandishad (قندیشاد), and Eslamabad (اسلام‌آباد).

== Demographics ==
=== Population ===
At the time of the 2006 National Census, the city's population was 18,132 in 4,472 households. The following census in 2011 counted 47,123 people in 12,674 households. The 2016 census measured the population of the city as 53,971 people in 15,850 households.
