= Saidabad Rural District (Shahriar County) =

Rural district in Tehran province, Iran

Saidabad Rural District Persian: دهستان سعيدآباد
- Rural District
- Location within Iran
- Coordinates: 35°40′N 51°12′E
- Country: Iran
- Province: Tehran
- County: Shahriar
- District: Central

Population (2016)
  - Total: 18,903
- Time zone: UTC+3:30 (IRST)

Saidabad Rural District (Persian: دهستان سعيدآباد) is in the Central District of Shahriar County, Tehran province, Iran.

== Demographics ==
=== Population ===
At the time of the 2006 National Census, the rural district's population was 16,176 in 4,190 households. There were 17,671 inhabitants in 4,822 households at the following census of 2011. The 2016 census measured the population of the rural district as 18,903 in 5,446 households. The most populous of its three villages was Saidabad, with 16,212 people.

=== Other villages in the rural district ===
- Bahman 22 Dormitory
- Varaminak
