= Khan Laq, North Khorasan =

City in North Khorasan province, Iran

Khan Laq Persian: خانلق
- City
- Location within Iran
- Coordinates: 37°25′37″N 57°56′12″E
- Country: Iran
- Province: North Khorasan
- County: Shirvan
- District: Central
- Established as a city: 2021

Population (2016)
  - Total: 6,518
- Time zone: UTC+3:30 (IRST)

Khan Laq (Persian: خانلق) (Note: Also romanized as Khān Laq; also known as Khanlog) is a city in the Central District of Shirvan County, North Khorasan province, Iran.

== Demographics ==
=== Population ===
At the time of the 2006 National Census, Khan Laq's population was 4,905 in 1,138 households, when it was a village in Ziarat Rural District. The following census in 2011 counted 7,714 people in 2,064 households. The 2016 census measured the population of the village as 6,518 people in 1,912 households, the most populous in its rural district.

Khan Laq was converted to a city in 2021.
