= Ziarat Rural District (Shirvan County) =

Rural district in North Khorasan province, Iran

Ziarat Rural District Persian: دهستان زيارت
- Rural District
- Location within Iran
- Coordinates: 37°29′N 57°50′E
- Country: Iran
- Province: North Khorasan
- County: Shirvan
- District: Central
- Established: 1987
- Capital: Ziarat

Population (2016)
  - Total: 11,316
- Time zone: UTC+3:30 (IRST)

Ziarat Rural District (Persian: دهستان زيارت) is in the Central District of Shirvan County, North Khorasan province, Iran. It is administered from the city of Ziarat.

== Demographics ==
=== Population ===
At the time of the 2006 National Census, the rural district's population was 14,277 in 3,414 households. There were 17,719 inhabitants in 4,751 households at the following census of 2011. The 2016 census measured the population of the rural district as 11,316 in 3,335 households. The most populous of its 15 villages was Khan Laq (now a city), with 6,518 people.

=== Other villages in the rural district ===
- Bigan
- Eslamabad-e Karkhaneh-ye Qand
- Garah Zu
- Karkhaneh-ye Qand-e Shirvan
- Qalaj
- Rezaabad
- Tudeh
