= Garah Zu =

Village in North Khorasan province, Iran

Garah Zu Persian: گره زو
- Village
- Location within Iran
- Coordinates: 37°23′31″N 57°53′09″E
- Country: Iran
- Province: North Khorasan
- County: Shirvan
- District: Central
- Rural District: Ziarat

Population (2016)
  - Total: 345
- Time zone: UTC+3:30 (IRST)

Garah Zu (Persian: گره زو) (Note: Also romanized as Garah Zū and Garehzow; also known as Garazū) is a village in Ziarat Rural District of the Central District in Shirvan County, North Khorasan province, Iran.

== Demographics ==
=== Population ===
At the time of the 2006 National Census, the village's population was 258 in 72 households. The following census in 2011 counted 321 people in 96 households. The 2016 census measured the population of the village as 345 people in 107 households.
