= Maviz Rural District =

Rural district in Tehran province, Iran

Maviz Rural District Persian: دهستان مويز
- Rural District
- Location within Iran
- Coordinates: 35°40′N 51°08′E
- Country: Iran
- Province: Tehran
- County: Shahriar
- District: Central
- Established: 1987

Population (2016)
  - Total: 5,782
- Time zone: UTC+3:30 (IRST)

Maviz Rural District (Persian: دهستان مويز) is in the Central District of Shahriar County, Tehran province, Iran. Its capital was the village of Deh Maviz until it was merged with several other villages to form the city of Baghestan.

== Demographics ==
=== Population ===
At the time of the 2006 National Census, the rural district's population was 6,199 in 1,499 households. There were 6,291 inhabitants in 1,632 households at the 2011 census. The 2016 census recorded a population of 5,782 in the rural district, spread across 1,597 households. The most populous of its three villages was Baba Salman (now a neighborhood in the city of Baghestan), with 4,859 people.

=== Other villages in the rural district ===
- Badamak
- Qaleh Baha
