= Bigan, Iran =

Village in North Khorasan province, Iran

Bigan Persian: بيگان
- Village
- Location within Iran
- Coordinates: 37°27′36″N 57°45′21″E
- Country: Iran
- Province: North Khorasan
- County: Shirvan
- District: Central
- Rural District: Ziarat

Population (2016)
  - Total: 741
- Time zone: UTC+3:30 (IRST)

Bigan (Persian: بيگان) (Note: Also romanized as Bīgān) is a village in Ziarat Rural District of the Central District in Shirvan County, North Khorasan province, Iran.

== Demographics ==
=== Population ===
At the time of the 2006 National Census, the village's population was 716 in 183 households. The following census in 2011 counted 781 people in 222 households. The 2016 census measured the population of the village as 741 people in 231 households.
