= Qaemabad Rural District (Shahriar County) =

Rural district in Tehran province, Iran

Qaemabad Rural District Persian: دهستان قائم آباد
- Rural District
- Location within Iran
- Coordinates: 35°35′N 51°06′E
- Country: Iran
- Province: Tehran
- County: Shahriar
- District: Central
- Established: 1987

Population (2016)
  - Total: 3,386
- Time zone: UTC+3:30 (IRST)

Qaemabad Rural District (Persian: دهستان قائم آباد) is in the Central District of Shahriar County, Tehran province, Iran. Its capital was the village of Qaemabad until it merged with other villages in forming the city of Sabashahr.

== Demographics ==
=== Population ===
At the time of the 2006 National Census, the rural district's population was 30,682 in 7,571 households. There were 3,900 inhabitants in 1,065 households at the following census of 2011. The 2016 census measured the population of the rural district as 3,386 in 1,000 households. The most populous of its two villages was Mahmudabad-e Khalajabad, with 2,433 people.

=== Other villages in the rural district ===
- Batri Sazi Nur
