= Vahidiyeh =

City in Tehran province, Iran

Vahidiyeh Persian: وحيديه
- City
- Baba Mahmud Tomb Tower in the city of Vahidiyeh

- Location within Iran
- Coordinates: 35°36′24″N 51°01′36″E
- Country: Iran
- Province: Tehran
- County: Shahriar
- District: Juqin
- Established as a city: 1996

Population (2016)
  - Total: 33,249
- Time zone: UTC+3:30 (IRST)

Vahidiyeh (Persian: وحيديه) (Note: Also romanized as Vahidieh and Vaḥīdīeh) is a city in, and the capital of, Juqin District of Shahriar County, Tehran province, Iran. The city is the 1996 merger of several villages, including Juqin (جوقین), the former capital of Juqin Rural District. Other villages merged to form Vahidiyeh were Qasabeh (قصبه), Qastanak (قصطانک), and Esmailabad (اسماعیل آباد).

== Demographics ==
=== Population ===
At the time of the 2006 National Census, the city's population was 24,871 in 6,131 households, when it was in the Central District. The following census in 2011 counted 22,405 people in 7,671 households. The 2016 census measured the population of the city as 33,249 people in 9,600 households.

In 2018, the city was separated from the district in the formation of Juqin District.

== See also ==
Media related to Vahidieh at Wikimedia Commons
