= Qalaj =

Village in North Khorasan province, Iran

Qalaj Persian: قلج
- Village
- Country: Iran
- Province: North Khorasan
- County: Shirvan
- District: Central
- Rural District: Ziarat

Population (2016)
  - Total: 289
- Time zone: UTC+3:30 (IRST)

Qalaj (Persian: قلج) is a village in Ziarat Rural District of the Central District in Shirvan County, North Khorasan province, Iran.

== Demographics ==
=== Population ===
At the time of the 2006 National Census, the village's population was 336 in 79 households. The following census in 2011 counted 314 people in 80 households. The 2016 census measured the population of the village as 289 people in 86 households.
