= Tudeh, North Khorasan =

Village in North Khorasan province, Iran

Tudeh Persian: توده
- Village
- Location within Iran
- Coordinates: 37°24′40″N 57°45′26″E
- Country: Iran
- Province: North Khorasan
- County: Shirvan
- District: Central
- Rural District: Ziarat

Population (2016)
  - Total: 772
- Time zone: UTC+3:30 (IRST)

Tudeh (Persian: توده) (Note: Also romanized as Tūdeh) is a village in Ziarat Rural District of the Central District in Shirvan County, North Khorasan province, Iran.

== Demographics ==
=== Population ===
At the time of the 2006 National Census, the village's population was 934 in 237 households. The following census in 2011 counted 835 people in 240 households. The 2016 census measured the population of the village as 772 people in 239 households.
