= Haft Juy Rural District =

Rural district in Tehran province, Iran

Haft Juy Rural District Persian: دهستان هفت جوی
- Rural District
- Location within Iran
- Coordinates: 35°43′N 51°03′E
- Country: Iran
- Province: Tehran
- County: Qods
- District: Central
- Established: 1996
- Capital: Haft Juy

Population (2016)
  - Total: 3,137
- Time zone: UTC+3:30 (IRST)

Haft Juy Rural District (Persian: دهستان هفت جوی) is in the Central District of Qods County, Tehran province, Iran. Its capital is the village of Haft Juy.

== Demographics ==
=== Population ===
At the time of the 2006 National Census, the rural district's population (as a part of the former Qods District of Shahriar County) was 2,924 in 799 households. There were 2,789 inhabitants in 865 households at the following census of 2011, by which time the district had been separated from the county in the establishment of Qods County. The rural district was transferred to the new Central District. The 2016 census measured the population of the rural district as 3,137 in 950 households. The most populous of its three villages was Haft Juy, with 3,137 people.
