= Shahedshahr =

City in Tehran province, Iran

Shahedshahr Persian: شاهدشهر
- City
- Location within Iran
- Coordinates: 35°34′23″N 51°05′13″E
- Country: Iran
- Province: Tehran
- County: Shahriar
- District: Central
- Established as a city: 1997

Population (2016)
  - Total: 25,544
- Time zone: UTC+3:30 (IRST)

Shahedshahr (Persian: شاهدشهر) (Note: Also romanized as Shāhedshahr; formerly ‘Alīābād Drazeh) is a city in the Central District of Shahriar County, Tehran province, Iran. In 1997, the villages of Aliabad (علی‌آباد), Derazeh (درازه), and Shahsavari (شهسواری) were merged to form the city of Shahedshahr.

== Demographics ==
=== Population ===
At the time of the 2006 National Census, the city's population was 18,855 in 4,599 households. The following census in 2011 counted 20,865 people in 5,694 households. The 2016 census measured the population of the city as 25,544 people in 7,543 households.

== See also ==
Media related to Shahedshahr at Wikimedia Commons
