= Rezaabad, Rudbar-e Jonubi =

Rezaabad رضااباد
- Village
- Location within Iran
- Coordinates: 28°11′05″N 57°52′48″E
- Country: Iran
- Province: Kerman
- County: Rudbar-e Jonubi
- Bakhsh: Central
- Rural District: Rudbar

Population (2006)
  - Total: 372
- Time zone: UTC+3:30 (IRST)
  - Summer (DST): UTC+4:30 (IRDT)

Rezaabad (Persian: رضااباد, also Romanized as Rez̤āābād) is a village in Rudbar Rural District, in the Central District of Rudbar-e Jonubi County, Kerman Province, Iran. At the 2006 census, its population was 372, in 71 families.
