= Rezaabad, Razavi Khorasan =

Village in Razavi Khorasan, Iran

Rezaabad رضااباد
- Village
- Location within Iran
- Coordinates: 35°15′10″N 60°38′25″E
- Country: Iran
- Province: Razavi Khorasan
- County: Torbat-e Jam
- Bakhsh: Central
- Rural District: Mian Jam

Population (2006)
  - Total: 155
- Time zone: UTC+3:30 (IRST)
  - Summer (DST): UTC+4:30 (IRDT)

Rezaabad (Persian: رضااباد, also Romanized as Reẕāābād) is a village in Mian Jam Rural District, in the Central District of Torbat-e Jam County, Razavi Khorasan Province, Iran. At the 2006 census, its population was 155, in 33 families.
