= Agha Danish =

Pakistani admiral

Admiral Agha Danish
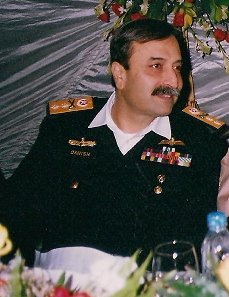
- Born: Karachi, Pakistan
- Education: Joint Services Staff College; Pakistan Naval Academy; Pakistan Air Force Academy; National Defence University, China; National Defence University, Pakistan
- Military career
- Allegiance: Pakistan
- Branch: Pakistan Navy
- Service years: 1974–2012
- Rank: Rear-Admiral
- Nickname: Danish
- Units: Pakistan Naval Air Arm; Naval Operations Branch
- Commands: Naval Air Arm; Naval War College; Naval Field Command Flag Officer Sea Training; GM Karachi Port Trust; Commanding Officer Naval Destroyer PNS Babur; Commanding Officer Naval Destroyer PNS Tariq; Commander Air; Director Naval Aviation; Squadron Commander Atlantic Squadron; Bahria University; National Centre For Maritime Policy Research
- Conflicts: India-Pakistan standoff in 2002; Indo-Pakistani standoff in 2008; War on terror 2004 Indian Ocean earthquake and tsunami
- Awards: Hilal-i-Imtiaz (military); Sitara-i-Imtiaz (military); Chief of Air Staff Best Combat Commander Trophy

Agha Danish (Urdu: آغا دانش) HI(m), SI(M), is a retired two-star rank admiral and a senior naval aviator in the Pakistan Navy. Starting his career in the Operations Branch of the Navy as a General Duty Pilot, the Admiral's last appointment was the Naval Field Command where he was responsible for overseeing operational and war preparedness of all air, surface and sub-surface units of the Pakistan Naval Fleet.

== Naval career ==
Danish joined the Pakistan Naval Academy after passing the pre-entrance university exams in 1970. In 1974, Danish gained his B.A. in Statistics, and was commissioned in the Naval Operations Branch, as a Sub-Lieutenant. The same year, he joined the Naval Aviation, and attended the College of Flying Training of the Pakistan Air Force Academy. He graduated there as a General Duty Pilot and became a first fighter pilot of the Navy. Upon his graduation, he was promoted to Lieutenant and commanded a fighter naval squadron, PNA Squadron No. 29 ASW, which is the Navy's primary anti-submarine squadron. As a pilot, he is also associated with several other flying units in Pakistan's armed forces including No. 1 Army Aviation Squadron and the 30 VP Squadron of the Navy's anti-submarine warfare branch. The Admiral was also sent to the United States to train on P3C Orion Aircraft, the Navy's anti-submarine and maritime surveillance aircraft, at the Naval Air Station in Jacksonville, Florida, when Pakistan purchased the long range maritime patrol aircraft fleet from the United States government. He is a graduate of National Defense College and holds a double M.Sc. in Defense and Strategic studies. Admiral Danish has also attended the Higher National Defense Command Course at the National Defense University in China. The Admiral later served as Directing Staff at the National Defense University in Pakistan where he was responsible for instructing seniors officers from all three armed forces of Pakistan.

During his career, the Admiral has held several important command and staff appointments including command of two naval destroyers namely PNS Babur and PNS Tariq, being one of the few naval officers to have held command of two naval destroyers simultaneously. He is also the only Naval officer to ever receive the Chief of Air Staff Trophy based on his exceptional flying skills. He also served as Commander Naval Aviation and Commandant Pakistan Naval War College and, in that regard, served on the Board of Governors of Bahria University. At Naval Headquarters, the Admiral was Principal Staff Officer with the Chief of the Naval Staff while also serving as Secretary Navy Board.

In 2005, Agha Danish joined the ranks of Naval Admiral. Thereafter he also served on the Karachi Port Trust Board as the General Manager where he oversaw all shipping and ground operations at the Karachi Port, one of the largest and busiest deep-water seaports in South Asia which handles about 60% of Pakistan's cargo. In 2010, Admiral Agha Danish was also recommended for appointment as Chairman of Port Qasim Authority in a note sent to the Prime Minister of Pakistan. The Admiral's last operational appointment was the Naval Field Command 'Flag Officer Sea Training' where he was responsible for overseeing operational and war preparedness of all air, surface and sub-surface units of the Pakistan Naval Fleet. Presently, he is serving as Director General for Bahria University and National Center for Maritime Policy Research.

Admiral Danish is also a recipient of Sitara-e-Imtiaz (Military) and Hilal-e-Imtiaz (Military), both awarded by the President of Pakistan. The Admiral is married with two children.
