= Rezaabad, Kazerun =

Rezaabad رضااباد
- Village
- Location within Iran
- Coordinates: 29°24′50″N 51°46′13″E
- Country: Iran
- Province: Fars
- County: Kazerun
- Bakhsh: Jereh and Baladeh
- Rural District: Dadin

Population (2006)
  - Total: 298
- Time zone: UTC+3:30 (IRST)
  - Summer (DST): UTC+4:30 (IRDT)

Rezaabad (Persian: رضااباد, also Romanized as Reẕāābād) is a village in Dadin Rural District, Jereh and Baladeh District, Kazerun County, Fars province, Iran. At the 2006 census, its population was 298, in 52 families.
