= Danesh Rural District =

Rural district in Tehran province, Iran

Danesh Rural District Persian: دهستان دانش
- Rural District
- Location within Iran
- Coordinates: 35°41′N 51°09′E
- Country: Iran
- Province: Tehran
- County: Qods
- District: Central
- Established: 1996
- Capital: Shahrak-e Danesh

Population (2016)
  - Total: 3,889
- Time zone: UTC+3:30 (IRST)

Danesh Rural District (Persian: دهستان دانش) is in the Central District of Qods County, Tehran province, Iran. Its capital is the village of Shahrak-e Danesh.

== Demographics ==
=== Population ===
At the time of the 2006 National Census, the rural district's population (as a part of the former Qods District in Shahriar County) was 4,799 in 1,225 households. There were 4,357 inhabitants in 1,278 households at the following census of 2011, by which time the district had been separated from the county in the establishment of Qods County. The rural district was transferred to the new Central District. The 2016 census measured the population of the rural district as 3,889 in 1,198 households. The most populous of its six villages was Shahrak-e Danesh, with 3,402 people.

=== Other villages in the rural district ===
- Zarnan-e Bala
- Zarnan-e Pain
