= Rezaabad-e Taheri =

Village in Razavi Khorasan, Iran

Rezaabad-e Taheri رضاابادطاهري
- Village
- Location within Iran
- Coordinates: 36°37′25″N 59°04′28″E
- Country: Iran
- Province: Razavi Khorasan
- County: Chenaran
- Bakhsh: Central
- Rural District: Chenaran

Population (2006)
  - Total: 228
- Time zone: UTC+3:30 (IRST)
  - Summer (DST): UTC+4:30 (IRDT)

Rezaabad-e Taheri (Persian: رضاابادطاهري, also Romanized as Reẕāābād-e Ţāherī; also known as Reẕāābād) is a village in Chenaran Rural District, in the Central District of Chenaran County, Razavi Khorasan Province, Iran. At the 2006 census, its population was 228, in 56 families.
