= Rezaabad, Mashiz =

Rezaabad رضا اباد
- Village
- Location within Iran
- Coordinates: 29°53′22″N 56°47′40″E
- Country: Iran
- Province: Kerman
- County: Bardsir
- Bakhsh: Central
- Rural District: Mashiz

Population (2006)
  - Total: 106
- Time zone: UTC+3:30 (IRST)
  - Summer (DST): UTC+4:30 (IRDT)

Rezaabad (Persian: رضا اباد, also Romanized as Reẕāābād) is a village in Mashiz Rural District, in the Central District of Bardsir County, Kerman Province, Iran. At the 2006 census, its population was 106, in 24 families.
