= Raziabad, Jiroft =

Raziabad رضي آباد
- Village
- Location within Iran
- Coordinates: 28°37′48″N 57°47′23″E
- Country: Iran
- Province: Kerman
- County: Jiroft
- Bakhsh: Central
- Rural District: Dowlatabad

Population (2006)
  - Total: 377
- Time zone: UTC+3:30 (IRST)
  - Summer (DST): UTC+4:30 (IRDT)

Raziabad (Persian: رضي آباد, also Romanized as Raẕīābād) is a village in Dowlatabad Rural District, in the Central District of Jiroft County, Kerman Province, Iran. At the 2006 census, its population was 377, in 77 families.
