= Noon Meem Danish =

Pakistani poet

Noor Mohammed Danish
- Born: Noor Mohammed; 1958 (age 67–68); Karachi, Sindh, Pakistan
- Occupation: Urdu poet
- Writing career
- Pen name: Danish
- Genre: Ghazal

Noor Mohammed Danish (Urdu: نور محمد دانش; born 1958), also known as Noon Meem Danish, is a Pakistani poet of African and Baloch descent.

== Early life and education ==
Danish was born in 1958 in Karachi, Sindh, Pakistan to a working-class family. He was raised in Lyari, a largely Sheedi neighbourhood, which he describes as "Karachi's Harlem". He received his early education at the Okhai Memon School in Kharadar, and began writing poetry in 1974. His African appearance often led people around him to assume he was a foreigner; he describes being asked frequently where he was from and how he had learned to spoke Urdu so well.

== Career ==
After receiving his master's degree in Urdu from the University of Karachi in 1984, Danish began teaching at the Urdu College. He invited Indian poet Bashir Badr to recite poetry at Karachi University one time; Badr was delayed, and the students began to become restless; he responded to their complaints about their pre-lunch hunger with the comment to the effect that he would not have arranged for such an eminent poet to come if he had known that "the students of the Urdu Department had their brains in the stomach and not the head."

== Poetry ==
He adopted "Danish" as his Takhallus (pen-name). Bachay, Titli, Phool, his first collection of poems, was published in 1997. He quickly garnered recognition for the anger he expressed through his works, in which he often made reference to his experiences as a member of the African diaspora; his work attracted the attention of leading Urdu critic Shamsur Rahman Farooqi, who had them published in Indian literary journal Shabkhoon. In 2000, he emigrated to the United States; he had remarked to a friend that he would prefer to be "a third class citizen of a first class country than a first class citizen of a third class country," but put off going through the procedures for almost two years due to his ambivalence about leaving his home. He first took up residence in the Kew Gardens neighborhood of Queens, New York City; he chose it because of its diversity, which helped him to feel less of a stranger as well as affording him the opportunity to study others' cultures. At first, he could only find job as a security guard, but he eventually joined the faculty of New York University; he later moved to the University of Maryland as a language consultant.

Danish cites Urdu poets such as Mustafa Zaidi, Obaidullah Aleem, Noon Meem Rashid, and Sirajuddin Zafar as his major influences. He is also an admirer of Langston Hughes and hopes to translate his works into Urdu. He is married and has two children.
