= Rezaabad Juchin =

Rezaabad Juchin رضاابادجوچين
- Village
- Location within Iran
- Coordinates: 30°01′28″N 52°51′44″E
- Country: Iran
- Province: Fars
- County: Marvdasht
- Bakhsh: Central
- Rural District: Naqsh-e Rostam

Population (2006)
  - Total: 598
- Time zone: UTC+3:30 (IRST)
  - Summer (DST): UTC+4:30 (IRDT)

Rezaabad Juchin (Persian: رضاابادجوچين, also Romanized as Reẕāābād Jūchīn; also known as Reẕāābād) is a village in Naqsh-e Rostam Rural District, in the Central District of Marvdasht County, Fars province, Iran. At the 2006 census, its population was 598, in 141 families.
