= Rezaabad-e Sarhang =

Village in Razavi Khorasan, Iran

Rezaabad-e Sarhang رضاابادسرهنگ
- Village
- Location within Iran
- Coordinates: 36°38′15″N 59°02′57″E
- Country: Iran
- Province: Razavi Khorasan
- County: Chenaran
- Bakhsh: Central
- Rural District: Chenaran

Population (2006)
  - Total: 312
- Time zone: UTC+3:30 (IRST)
  - Summer (DST): UTC+4:30 (IRDT)

Rezaabad-e Sarhang (Persian: رضاابادسرهنگ, also Romanized as Reẕāābād-e Sarhang) is a village in Chenaran Rural District, in the Central District of Chenaran County, Razavi Khorasan Province, Iran. At the 2006 census, its population was 312, in 76 families.
