= Rezaabad, Yusefvand =

Rezaabad رضااباد
- Village
- Location within Iran
- Coordinates: 33°49′42″N 48°14′59″E
- Country: Iran
- Province: Lorestan
- County: Selseleh
- Bakhsh: Central
- Rural District: Yusefvand

Population (2006)
  - Total: 38
- Time zone: UTC+3:30 (IRST)
  - Summer (DST): UTC+4:30 (IRDT)

Rezaabad (Persian: رضااباد, also Romanized as Reẕāābād and Rezāābād; also known as Reẕāābād-e Salīāneh) is a village in Yusefvand Rural District, in the Central District of Selseleh County, Lorestan Province, Iran. At the 2006 census, its population was 38, in 8 families.
