= Raziabad, Hamadan =

Raziabad رضي آباد
- Village
- Location within Iran
- Coordinates: 34°09′59″N 48°23′01″E
- Country: Iran
- Province: Hamadan
- County: Nahavand
- Bakhsh: Central
- Rural District: Shaban

Population (2006)
  - Total: 405
- Time zone: UTC+3:30 (IRST)
  - Summer (DST): UTC+4:30 (IRDT)

Raziabad (Persian: رضي آباد, also Romanized as Raẕīābād) is a village in Shaban Rural District, in the Central District of Nahavand County, Hamadan Province, Iran. At the 2006 census, its population was 405, in 104 families.
