= Rezaabad, Kerman =

Rezaabad رضااباد
- Village
- Location within Iran
- Coordinates: 30°15′07″N 56°36′09″E
- Country: Iran
- Province: Kerman
- County: Kerman
- Bakhsh: Central
- Rural District: Baghin

Population (2006)
  - Total: 63
- Time zone: UTC+3:30 (IRST)
  - Summer (DST): UTC+4:30 (IRDT)

Rezaabad (Persian: رضااباد, also Romanized as Rez̤āābād) is a village in Baghin Rural District, in the Central District of Kerman County, Kerman Province, Iran. At the 2006 census, its population was 63, in 11 families.
