= Danish (name) =

Danesh or Danish (Persian: دانش) is a Persian word which literally translates to "knowledge", "science" and "wisdom". It is a popular Muslim name in the Indian subcontinent, and to a certain extent, Southeast Asia, especially in the Muslim-majority countries of Malaysia and Indonesia.

Notable people with the name include:

== Given name ==
=== Film and television ===
- Danish Taimoor (born 1983), Pakistani actor and model
- Danish Nawaz (born 1978), Pakistani director, comedian and actor
- Danish Pandor, Indian actor in Agent Raghav – Crime Branch
- Danish Sait, Indian actor, comedian and influencer working in Kannada Film Industry, known for prank calls

=== Journalism ===
- Danish Karokhel, Afghan journalist, director of Pajhwok Afghan News agency
- Danish Siddiqui (1980–2021), Indian photojournalist, killed in Afghanistan

=== Sport ===
- Danish Kaneria (born 1980), Pakistani cricketer
- Danish Atlas Khan (born 1994), Pakistani squash player
- Danish Mujtaba (born 1988), Indian field hockey player

=== Other ===
- Daniş Tunalıgil (1915–1975), Turkish diplomat
- Aminul Islam Danesh Mia (1919–2006), Bangladeshi politician

== Surname ==
- Agha Danish, Pakistani naval officer
- Darius Campbell Danesh (1980–2022), Scottish musician and actor
- Davoud Danesh-Jafari (born 1954), Iranian economist
- Haji Mohammad Danesh (1900–1986), Bangladeshi politician
- Ihsan Danish (1915–1982), Pakistani poet
- Noon Meem Danish (born 1958), Pakistani poet
- Nora Danish (born 1982), Malaysian actress, singer and model
- Sarwar Danish (born 1961), Afghan politician
- Tyler Danish (born 1994), American professional baseball pitcher for the Boston Red Sox of Major League Baseball (MLB)

== See also ==
- Danishmendid dynasty, a Turcoman dynasty
- The ship Empire Sally was renamed Danesh
- Hajee Mohammad Danesh Science & Technology University, Bangladesh
