= Rezaabad-e Mian Volan =

Rezaabad-e Mian Volan رضاابادميان ولان
- Village
- Location within Iran
- Coordinates: 33°49′57″N 48°14′02″E
- Country: Iran
- Province: Lorestan
- County: Selseleh
- Bakhsh: Central
- Rural District: Doab

Population (2006)
  - Total: 28
- Time zone: UTC+3:30 (IRST)
  - Summer (DST): UTC+4:30 (IRDT)

Rezaabad-e Mian Volan (Persian: رضاابادميان ولان, also Romanized as Reẕāābād-e Mīān Volān) is a village in Doab Rural District, in the Central District of Selseleh County, Lorestan Province, Iran. At the 2006 census, its population was 28, with a total of in 5 families.
