= Rezaabad, Delfan =

Rezaabad رضا آباد
- Village
- Location within Iran
- Coordinates: 34°04′49″N 47°50′51″E
- Country: Iran
- Province: Lorestan
- County: Delfan
- Bakhsh: Central
- Rural District: Nurabad

Population (2006)
  - Total: 266
- Time zone: UTC+3:30 (IRST)
  - Summer (DST): UTC+4:30 (IRDT)

Rezaabad (Persian: رضا آباد, also Romanized as Reẕāābād) is a village in Nurabad Rural District, in the Central District of Delfan County, Lorestan Province, Iran. At the 2006 census, its population was 266, in 61 families.
