= Rezaabad, Eqlid =

Rezaabad رضااباد
- Village
- Location within Iran
- Coordinates: 30°24′55″N 52°37′04″E
- Country: Iran
- Province: Fars
- County: Eqlid
- Bakhsh: Hasanabad
- Rural District: Ahmadabad

Population (2006)
  - Total: 673
- Time zone: UTC+3:30 (IRST)
  - Summer (DST): UTC+4:30 (IRDT)

Rezaabad (Persian: رضااباد, also Romanized as Reẕāābād; also known as Rizā‘ābād) is a village in Ahmadabad Rural District, Hasanabad District, Eqlid County, Fars province, Iran. At the 2006 census, its population was 673, in 145 families.
