= Raziabad, Qazvin =

Raziabad رضي اباد
- Village
- Location within Iran
- Coordinates: 36°02′58″N 50°11′07″E
- Country: Iran
- Province: Qazvin
- County: Abyek
- Bakhsh: Basharyat
- Rural District: Basharyat-e Gharbi

Population (2006)
  - Total: 364
- Time zone: UTC+3:30 (IRST)
  - Summer (DST): UTC+4:30 (IRDT)

Raziabad (Persian: رضي اباد, also Romanized as Raẕīābād, Razīābād, and Rizaābād) is a village in Basharyat-e Gharbi Rural District, Basharyat District, Abyek County, Qazvin Province, Iran. At the 2006 census, its population was 364, in 81 families.
