= Rezaabad, Shazand =

Rezaabad رضااباد
- Village
- Location within Iran
- Coordinates: 33°54′03″N 49°04′08″E
- Country: Iran
- Province: Markazi
- County: Shazand
- Bakhsh: Zalian
- Rural District: Zalian

Population (2006)
  - Total: 90
- Time zone: UTC+3:30 (IRST)
  - Summer (DST): UTC+4:30 (IRDT)

Rezaabad (Persian: رضااباد, also Romanized as Reẕāābād and Rezāābād; also known as Raziābād and Reẕāābā) is a village in Zalian Rural District, Zalian District, Shazand County, Markazi Province, Iran. At the 2006 census, its population was 90, in 24 families.
