= Central District (Qods County) =

District in Tehran province, Iran

Central District (Qods County) Persian: بخش مرکزی شهرستان قدس
- District
- Location within Iran
- Coordinates: 35°42′N 51°06′E
- Country: Iran
- Province: Tehran
- County: Qods
- Established: 2009
- Capital: Qods

Population (2016)
  - Total: 316,631
- Time zone: UTC+3:30 (IRST)

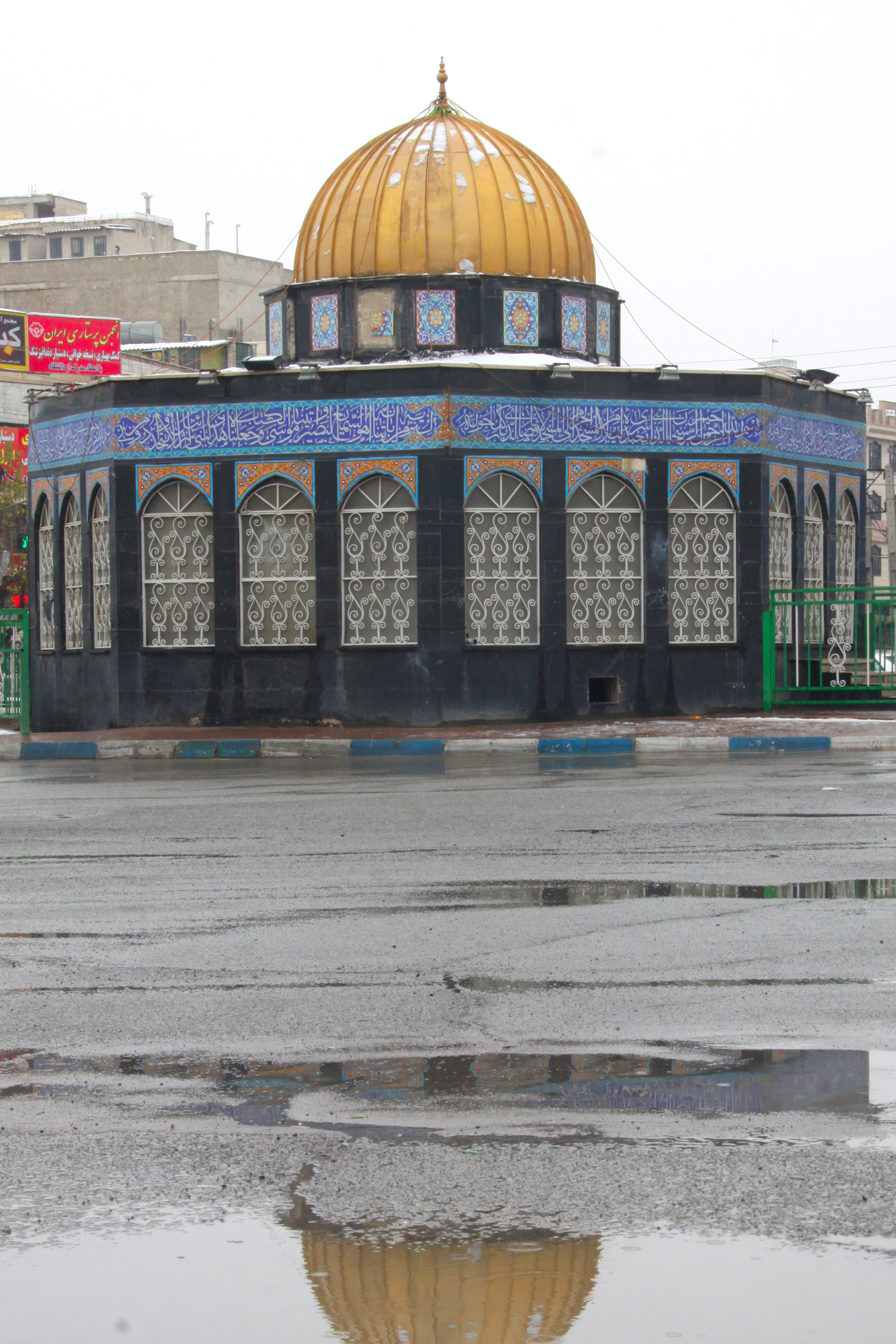
Qods city

The Central District of Qods County (Persian: بخش مرکزی شهرستان قدس) is in Tehran province, Iran. Its capital is the city of Qods.

== History ==
In 2009, Qods District was separated from Shahriar County in the establishment of Qods County, which was divided into one district of two rural districts, with Qods as its capital and only city at the time.

== Demographics ==
=== Population ===
At the time of the 2011 National Census, the district's population was 290,663 people in 85,169 households. The 2016 census measured the population of the district as 316,631 inhabitants in 96,680 households.

=== Administrative divisions ===
Central District (Qods County) Population
Administrative Divisions	2011	2016
Danesh RD	4,357	3,889
Haft Juy RD	2,789	3,137
Qods (city)	283,517	309,605
Total	290,663	316,631
RD = Rural District
