= Rezaabad, Ziarat =

Village in North Khorasan province, Iran

Rezaabad Persian: رضااباد
- Village
- Location within Iran
- Coordinates: 37°26′55″N 57°44′17″E
- Country: Iran
- Province: North Khorasan
- County: Shirvan
- District: Central
- Rural District: Ziarat

Population (2016)
  - Total: 330
- Time zone: UTC+3:30 (IRST)

Rezaabad (Persian: رضااباد) (Note: Also romanized as Reẕāābād; also known as Reẕāābād-e Gharbī (رضا اباد غربي) and Rizāābād) is a village in Ziarat Rural District of the Central District in Shirvan County, North Khorasan province, Iran.

== Demographics ==
=== Population ===
At the time of the 2006 National Census, the village's population was 340 in 79 households. The following census in 2011 counted 390 people in 100 households. The 2016 census measured the population of the village as 330 people in 89 households.
