= Juqin Rural District =

Rural district in Tehran province, Iran

Juqin Rural District Persian: دهستان جوقين
- Rural District
- Location within Iran
- Coordinates: 35°34′N 50°56′E
- Country: Iran
- Province: Tehran
- County: Shahriar
- District: Juqin
- Established: 1987

Population (2016)
  - Total: 21,540
- Time zone: UTC+3:30 (IRST)

Juqin Rural District (Persian: دهستان جوقين) is in Juqin District of Shahriar County, Tehran province, Iran. Its capital was the village of Juqin until its merger with several other villages to form the city of Vahidiyeh.

== Demographics ==
=== Population ===
At the time of the 2006 National Census, the rural district's population (as a part of the Central District) was 22,587 in 5,771 households. There were 23,075 inhabitants in 6,566 households at the following census of 2011. The 2016 census measured the population of the rural district as 21,540 in 6,511 households. The most populous of its 20 villages was Fararat, with 4,856 people.

In 2018, the rural district was separated from the district in the formation of Juqin District.

=== Other villages in the rural district ===
- Asilabad
- Bokeh
- Hesar-e Sati
- Institutional Group Home 33
- Kord Amir
- Qajarabad
- Saqarchin
- Yabarak
