= Qods County =

County in Tehran province, Iran

Qods County Persian: شهرستان قدس
- County
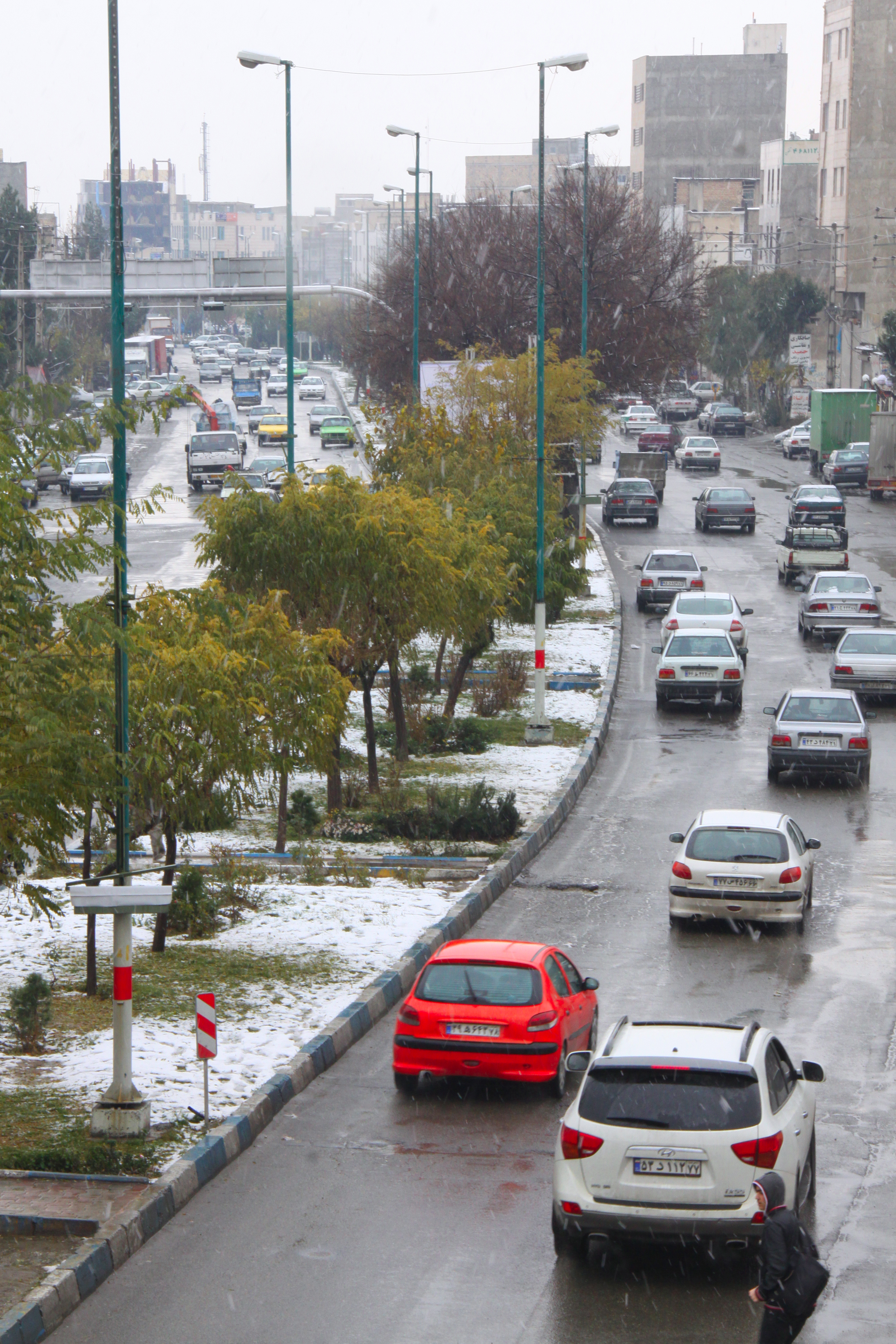

- Location of Qods County in Tehran province (top left, pink)

- Location of Tehran province in Iran
- Coordinates: 35°42′N 51°06′E
- Country: Iran
- Province: Tehran
- Established: 2009
- Capital: Qods
- Districts: Central

Area
  - Total: 81.2 km^{2} (31.4 sq mi)

Population (2016)
  - Total: 316,636
  - Density: 3,900/km^{2} (10,100/sq mi)
- Time zone: UTC+3:30 (IRST)

Qods County (Persian: شهرستان قدس) is in Tehran province, Iran. Its capital is the city of Qods.

== History ==
In 2009, Qods District was separated from Shahriar County in the establishment of Qods County, which was divided into one district of two rural districts, with Qods as its capital and only city at the time.

== Demographics ==
=== Population ===
At the time of the 2011 National Census, the county's population was 290,663 people in 85,169 households. The 2016 census measured the population of the county as 316,636 in 96,682 households.

=== Administrative divisions ===
Qods County's population history and administrative structure over two consecutive censuses are shown in the following table.

Qods County Population
Administrative Divisions	2011	2016
Central District	290,663	316,631
Danesh RD	4,357	3,889
Haft Juy RD	2,789	3,137
Qods (city)	283,517	309,605
Total	290,663	316,636
RD = Rural District

== Climate ==
According to the information of the State Meteorological Organization of Tehran province, the long-term average annual rainfall of Qods is around 246.1 mm

== See also ==
Media related to Qods County at Wikimedia Commons
