= Qods District =

Former district in Tehran province, Iran

Qods District Persian: بخش قدس
- Former District
- Location within Iran
- Coordinates: 35°42′03″N 51°06′23″E
- Country: Iran
- Province: Tehran
- County: Shahriar
- Established: 1996
- Capital: Qods

Population (2006)
  - Total: 237,077
- Time zone: UTC+3:30 (IRST)

Qods District (Persian: بخش قدس) is a former administrative division of Shahriar County, Tehran province, Iran. Its capital was the city of Qods.

== History ==
In 2009, the district was separated from the county in the establishment of Qods County.

== Demographics ==
=== Population ===
At the time of the 2006 census, the district's population was 237,077 in 62,355 households.

=== Administrative divisions ===
Qods District Population
Administrative Divisions	2006
Danesh RD	4,799
Haft Juy RD	2,924
Qods (city)	229,354
Total	237,077
RD = Rural District
