= Juqin District =

District in Tehran province, Iran

Juqin District Persian: بخش جوقین
- District
- Location within Iran
- Coordinates: 35°35′N 51°00′E
- Country: Iran
- Province: Tehran
- County: Shahriar
- Established: 2018
- Capital: Vahidiyeh
- Time zone: UTC+3:30 (IRST)

Juqin District (Persian: بخش جوقین) is in Shahriar County of Tehran province, Iran. Its capital is the city of Vahidiyeh, whose population at the time of the 2016 National Census was 33,249 people in 9,600 households.

== History ==
In 2018, Ferdows and Juqin Rural Districts, and the cities of Ferdowsiyeh and Vahidiyeh, were separated from the Central District in the formation of Juqin District.

== Demographics ==
=== Administrative divisions ===
Juqin District
Administrative Divisions
Ferdows RD
Juqin RD
Ferdowsiyeh (city) (Note: Merger of several villages in 2000)
Vahidiyeh (city) (Note: Merger of several villages in 1996)
RD = Rural District
