= Central District (Shahriar County) =

District in Tehran province, Iran

Central District (Shahriar County) Persian: بخش مرکزی شهرستان شهریار
- District
- Location within Iran
- Coordinates: 35°37′N 51°07′E
- Country: Iran
- Province: Tehran
- County: Shahriar
- Established: 1989
- Capital: Shahriar

Population (2016)
  - Total: 744,206
- Time zone: UTC+3:30 (IRST)

The Central District of Shahriar County (Persian: بخش مرکزی شهرستان شهریار) is in Tehran province, Iran. Its capital is the city of Shahriar.

== History ==
In 2018, Ferdows and Juqin Rural Districts, and the cities of Ferdowsiyeh and Vahidiyeh, were separated from the district in the formation of Juqin District.

== Demographics ==
=== Population ===
At the time of the 2006 National Census, the district's population was 516,022 in 134,378 households. The following census in 2011 counted 624,440 people in 178,794 households. The 2016 census measured the population of the district as 744,206 inhabitants in 226,007 households.

=== Administrative divisions ===
Central District (Shahriar County) Population
Administrative Divisions	2006	2011	2016
Ferdows RD (Note: Transferred to Juqin District)	15,225	8,041	12,003
Juqin RD	22,587	23,075	21,540
Maviz RD	6,199	6,291	5,782
Qaemabad RD	30,682	3,900	3,386
Razakan RD	25,395	26,420	26,004
Saidabad RD	16,176	17,671	18,903
Andisheh (city)	75,596	96,807	116,062
Baghestan (city) (Note: Merger of several villages in 2004)	52,330	71,861	83,934
Ferdowsiyeh (city) (Note: Merger of several villages in 2000)	20,854	24,508	34,221
Sabashahr (city) (Note: Merger of several villages in 1996)	18,132	47,123	53,971
Shahedshahr (city) (Note: Merger of several villages in 1997)	18,855	20,865	25,544
Shahriar (city)	189,120	249,473	309,607
Vahidiyeh (city) (Note: Merger of several villages in 1996)	24,871	28,405	33,249
Total	516,022	624,440	744,206
RD = Rural District
