= Shahriar County =

County in Tehran province, Iran

Shahriar County شهرستان شهریار
- County
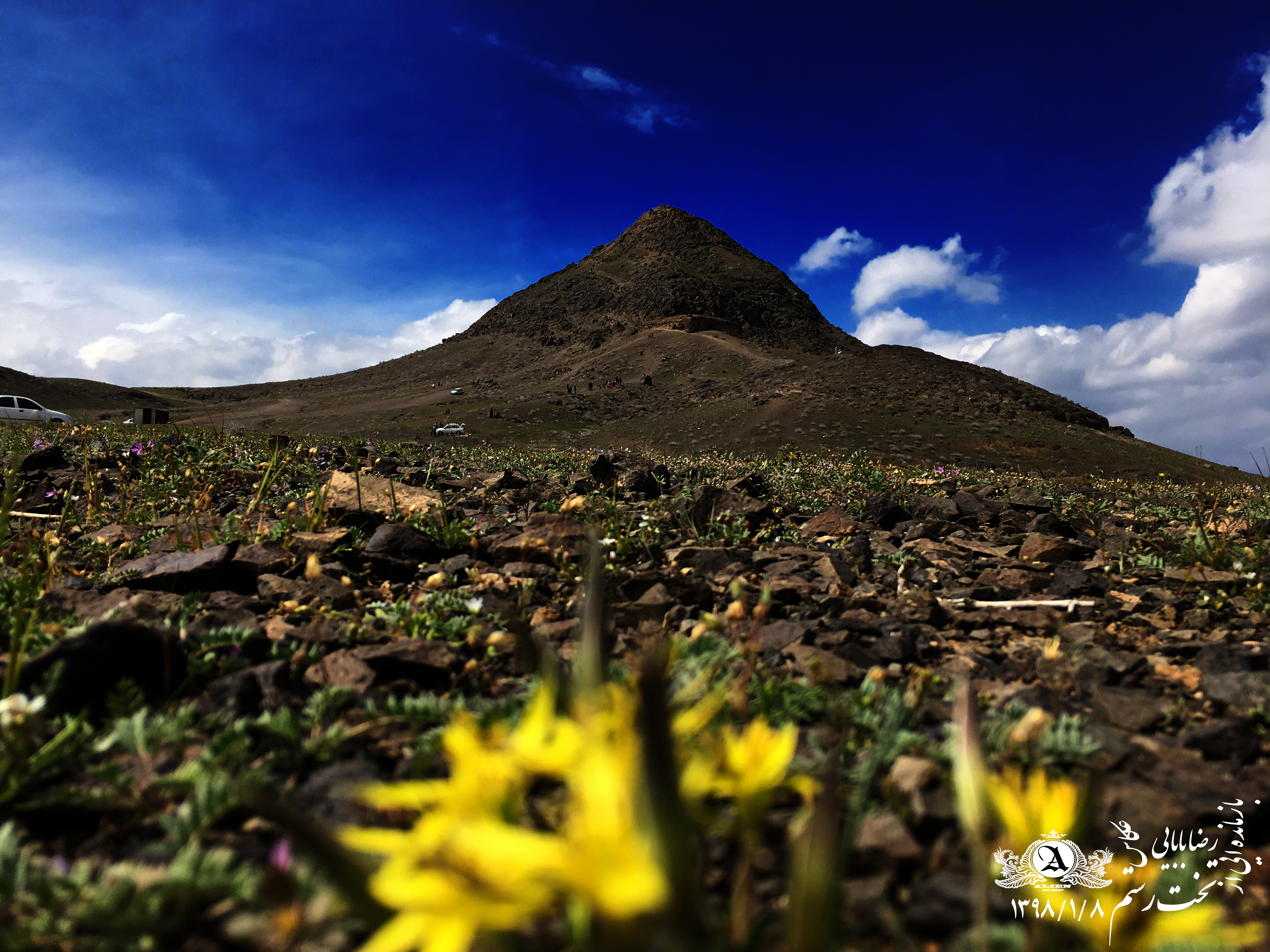
- Landscape in Shahriar County

- Location of Shahriar County in Tehran province (center left, purple)

- Location of Tehran province in Iran
- Coordinates: 35°36′N 51°05′E
- Country: Iran
- Province: Tehran
- Established: 1989
- Capital: Shahriar
- Districts: Central, Juqin

Area
  - Total: 335.9 km^{2} (129.7 sq mi)

Population (2016)
  - Total: 744,210
  - Density: 2,216/km^{2} (5,738/sq mi)
- Time zone: UTC+3:30 (IRST)

Shahriar County (شهرستان شهریار) is in Tehran province, Iran. Its capital is the city of Shahriar.

== History ==
In 2009, Malard and Qods Districts were separated from the county in the establishment of Malard and Qods Counties, respectively.

In 2018, Ferdows and Juqin Rural Districts, and the cities of Ferdowsiyeh and Vahidiyeh, were separated from the Central District in the formation of Juqin District.

== Demographics ==
=== Population ===
At the time of the 2006 National Census, the county's population was 1,044,707 in 273,826 households. The following census in 2011 counted 624,440 people in 178,792 households. The 2016 census measured the population of the county as 744,210 in 226,011 households.

=== Administrative divisions ===
Shahriar County's population history and administrative structure over three consecutive censuses are shown in the following table.

Shahriar County population
Administrative divisions	2006	2011	2016
Central District	516,022	624,440	744,206
Ferdows RD	15,225	8,041	12,003
Juqin RD	22,587	23,075	21,540
Maviz RD	6,199	6,291	5,782
Qaemabad RD	30,682	3,900	3,386
Razakan RD	25,395	26,420	26,004
Saidabad RD	16,176	17,671	18,903
Andisheh (city)	75,596	96,807	116,062
Baghestan (city) (Note: Merger of several villages in 2004.)	52,330	71,861	83,934
Ferdowsiyeh (city)	20,854	24,508	34,221
Sabashahr (city) (Note: Merger of several villages in 1996.)	18,132	47,123	53,971
Shahedshahr (city) (Note: Merger of several villages in 1997.)	18,855	20,865	25,544
Shahriar (city)	189,120	249,473	309,607
Vahidiyeh (city)	24,871	28,405	33,249
Juqin District (Note: Established after the 2016 census.)			
Ferdows RD			
Juqin RD			
Ferdowsiyeh (city) (Note: Merger of several villages in 2000.)			
Vahidiyeh (city) (Note: Merger of several villages in 1996.)			
Malard District (Note: Transferred to Malard County.)	291,608		
Akhtarabad RD	3,598		
Bibi Sakineh RD	16,003		
Malard RD (Note: Renamed Malard-e Shomali Rural District.)	27,479		
Malard (city)	228,673		
Safadasht (city) (Note: Formerly Shahrabad.)	15,855		
Qods District (Note: Transferred to Qods County.)	237,077		
Danesh RD	4,799		
Haft Juy RD	2,924		
Qods (city)	229,354		
Total	1,044,707	624,440	744,210
RD = Rural District

== Climate ==
According to the State Meteorological Organization of Tehran province, the long-term average annual rainfall of Shahriar County is approximately 217.3 mm.

== See also ==
Media related to Shahriar County at Wikimedia Commons
