= Kuchar (disambiguation) =

Kuchar is a village in Alborz County, Qazvin Province, Iran. It may also refer to:

- Kuqa, a city in Xinjiang, China, known as Kuchar in Uyghur
- Kucha, an ancient Buddhist kingdom located in the same area as the modern city of Kuqa, also known as Kuchar in Uyghur
- Kuchař (surname), a surname of Czech and Slovak-language origin
- Kukhar (surname), a Ukrainian surname, sometimes transliterated as Kuchar
- Kuchar (surname), a surname of Slavic origin
