= Qadimabad =

Village in Qazvin province, Iran

Qadimabad Persian: قديم اباد
- Village
- Location within Iran
- Coordinates: 36°10′50″N 49°58′25″E
- Country: Iran
- Province: Qazvin
- County: Qazvin
- District: Central
- Rural District: Eqbal-e Gharbi

Population (2016)
  - Total: 1,469
- Time zone: UTC+3:30 (IRST)

Qadimabad (Persian: قديم اباد) (Note: Also romanized as Qadīmābād; also known as Kadimabad) is a village in Eqbal-e Gharbi Rural District of the Central District in Qazvin County, Qazvin province, Iran.

== Demographics ==
=== Population ===
At the time of the 2006 National Census, the village's population was 1,550 in 355 households, when it was Pir Yusefian Rural District of the Central District in Alborz County. The following census in 2011 counted 1,696 people in 457 households. The 2016 census measured the population of the village as 1,469 people in 433 households, by which time the village had been transferred to Eqbal-e Gharbi Rural District of the Central District in Qazvin County.
