= Guni =

Guni may refer to:

== People ==
- Guni Israeli (born 1984), Israeli basketball player
- Nox Guni (born 1983), Zimbabwean musician
- Guni (biblical figure), son of Naphtali

== Places ==
- Guni, Republic of Dagestan, Russia
- Guni, Vedensky District, Russia
- Guni, Zanjan, Iran
- Guni, West Azerbaijan, or Quni, Iran

== See also ==
- Guni-Guni
- Quni (disambiguation)
