= Ravand (disambiguation) =

Ravand is a village in West Azerbaijan Province, Iran.

Ravand (Persian: راوند) may also refer to:

- Ravand Institute
- Ravand-e Olya, Hamadan, Hamadan Province
- Ravand-e Vosta, Hamadan Province
- Ravand-e Olya, West Azerbaijan, West Azerbaijan Province
- Ravand-e Sofla, West Azerbaijan Province

== Surname ==
- Nagin Ravand (born 1999), Danish-Afghan football coach
