= Gol-e Sheykhan =

Gol-e Sheykhan گل شيخان
- Village
- Location within Iran
- Coordinates: 37°40′53″N 44°40′27″E
- Country: Iran
- Province: West Azerbaijan
- County: Urmia
- Bakhsh: Sumay-ye Beradust
- Rural District: Beradust

Population (2006)
  - Total: 410
- Time zone: UTC+3:30 (IRST)
  - Summer (DST): UTC+4:30 (IRDT)

Gol-e Sheykhan (Persian: گل شيخان, also Romanized as Gol-e Sheykhān) is a village in Beradust Rural District, Sumay-ye Beradust District, Urmia County, West Azerbaijan Province, Iran. At the 2006 census, its population was 410, in 80 families.
