= Asengaran =

Asengaran اسنگران
- Village
- Location within Iran
- Coordinates: 37°39′24″N 44°48′19″E
- Country: Iran
- Province: West Azerbaijan
- County: Urmia
- Bakhsh: Sumay-ye Beradust
- Rural District: Beradust

Population (2006)
  - Total: 80
- Time zone: UTC+3:30 (IRST)
  - Summer (DST): UTC+4:30 (IRDT)

Asengaran (Persian: اسنگران, also Romanized as Āsengarān; also known as Āsīngarān and Āsīngarn) is a village in Beradust Rural District, Sumay-ye Beradust District, Urmia County, West Azerbaijan Province, Iran. At the 2006 census, its population was 80, in 17 families.
