= Kanespi =

Kanespi (Persian: كانسپي) may refer to:

- Kanespi, Beradust
- Kanespi, alternate name of Kanisi, Beradust Rural District
- Kanespi, Sumay-ye Jonubi
