= Nosratabad, Qazvin =

Village in Qazvin province, Iran

Nosratabad Persian: نصرت اباد
- Village
- Location within Iran
- Coordinates: 36°09′46″N 50°05′58″E
- Country: Iran
- Province: Qazvin
- County: Alborz
- District: Central
- Rural District: Nosratabad

Population (2006)
  - Total: 13,090
- Time zone: UTC+3:30 (IRST)

Nosratabad (Persian: نصرت اباد) (Note: Also romanized as Noşratābād) is a village in, and the former capital of, Nosratabad Rural District in the Central District of Alborz County, Qazvin province, Iran. The capital of the rural district has been transferred to the village of Kamalabad.

== Demographics ==
=== Population ===
At the time of the 2006 National Census, the village's population was 13,090 in 3,359 households. After the census, the village was annexed to the city of Alvand and did not appear in the censuses of 2011 and 2016. Nosratabad was separated once again from Alvand in 2024.
