= Avdelan =

Avdelan (Persian: اودلان), also rendered as Abdilan, may refer to:

- Avdelan-e Olya
- Avdelan-e Sofla
