= Gowdal, West Azerbaijan =

Gowdal گودل
- Village
- Location within Iran
- Coordinates: 37°50′06″N 44°31′03″E
- Country: Iran
- Province: West Azerbaijan
- County: Urmia
- Bakhsh: Sumay-ye Beradust
- Rural District: Sumay-ye Jonubi

Population (2006)
  - Total: 99
- Time zone: UTC+3:30 (IRST)
  - Summer (DST): UTC+4:30 (IRDT)

Gowdal (Persian: گودل, also romanized as Gowdāl and Gūdal) is a village in Sumay-ye Jonubi Rural District, Sumay-ye Beradust District, Urmia County, West Azerbaijan Province, Iran. At the 2006 census, its population was 99, in 18 families.
