= Elî Kaşifpûr =

Ali Kashefpour

- Born: June 24, 1957; Urmia
- Died: August 15, 1990 (aged 33); Konya
- Cause of death: Assassination
- Other names: Ali Kaşifi, Ali Kashefpour, Eli kashefi
- Citizenship: Iran
- Education: Sociology and political science
- Occupation: Politician
- Website: elikasifpur.com

Notes
- Serî dana ji bo kurdistaneke serbixwe ye ter azadî, aştî û demokrasî

Elî Kaşifpûr (Ali Kashefpour) was a member of the central committee of the Kurdistan Democratic Party of Iran KDP-I. He was assassinated on August 15, 1990, in Konya.

== Early life and education ==
Elî Kaşifpûr was born on 24 June 1957 in the village of Piranjuq, near the city of Urmia in north-western Iran.

Elî completed his primary education in Hovarsin and continued his secondary education in Urmia. He initially enrolled at the University of Tabriz, studying Social Sciences, but later transferred to the University of Tehran to study Political Science.

During his last academic year, the Iranian people revolted against the Pahlavi dynasty, which led to the establishment of the Islamic Republic.

== Political Activism ==
During his time at the University of Tehran, the political climate in Iran was highly turbulent. In 1978, the popular uprising against the Shah’s regime began, and Eli actively participated in the protests. His involvement led to arrests and interrogations by the secret police. Despite the harsh treatment, Eli remained steadfast in his beliefs.

== Joining the Democratic Party of Iranian Kurdistan ==
After the fall of the Shah’s regime in 1979, Eli joined the Democratic Party of Iranian Kurdistan PDKI. He became a member of the peshmerga forces, the armed fighters of the Kurdish movement, and quickly rose through the ranks due to his dedication and leadership skills. By 1979, he was elected as a member of the Central Committee of the PDKI

The Kurdish people demanded freedom, equality and democracy. With the help of his friends, he set up a library in his father's village of Hovarsin. He always encouraged young people to read and gain knowledge and believed that the reason for Kurdish backwardness was ignorance and illiteracy. During his political career he was active in Northern Kurdistan of Iran.

== Assassination ==
In 1990, while his family was in Turkey, Eli went to take care of them. Despite his preference to remain in Kurdistan, he followed the party’s advice and went to Turkey. On August 15, 1990, Eli Kasifpûr was assassinated by agents of the Islamic Republic of Iran, in collaboration with the Turkish secret service MIT. His body was found on the road from Konya to Ankara.

Eli Kasifpûr is remembered as a prominent Kurdish leader and martyr who dedicated his life to the struggle for Kurdish independence and rights. His leadership and sacrifice have left a lasting impact on the Kurdish movement.

== Books ==
- Bîranîna Elî Kaşifpûr written by Rojan Hazim

== Video ==
Speech Elî Kaşifpûr on YouTube
