= Kuraneh =

Kuraneh (Persian: كورانه) may refer to:

- Kuraneh, Qazvin
- Kuraneh, Baranduzchay-ye Jonubi, Urmia County, West Azerbaijan Province
- Kuraneh, Silvaneh, Urmia County, West Azerbaijan Province
- Kuraneh, Sumay-ye Beradust, Urmia County, West Azerbaijan Province
