= Ravand-e Olya =

Ravand-e Olya (Persian: راوندعليا or روندعليا) may refer to:

- Ravand-e Olya, Hamadan (راوندعليا - Rāvand-e ‘Olyā)
- Ravand-e Olya, West Azerbaijan (روندعليا - Ravand-e ‘Olyā)
