= Mastakan =

Mastakan (Persian: مستكان) may refer to:

- Mastakan, Beradust
- Mastakan, Sumay-ye Shomali
