= Kurani, Sumay-ye Jonubi =

Village in West Azerbaijan province, Iran

Kurani Persian: کوراني
- Village
- Location within Iran
- Coordinates: 37°48′20″N 44°30′00″E
- Country: Iran
- Province: West Azerbaijan
- County: Urmia
- District: Sumay-ye Beradust
- Rural District: Sumay-ye Jonubi

Population (2016)
  - Total: 959
- Time zone: UTC+3:30 (IRST)

Kurani (Persian: کوراني) (Note: Also romanized as Kūrānī; formerly known as Kuran (كوران), also romanized as Kūrān) is a village in Sumay-ye Jonubi Rural District of Sumay-ye Beradust District in Urmia County, West Azerbaijan province, Iran.

== Demographics ==
=== Population ===
At the time of the 2006 National Census, the village's population, as Kuran, was 1,195 in 207 households. The following census in 2011 counted 371 people in 68 households. The 2016 census measured the population of the village as 959 people in 200 households, by which time the village was listed as Kurani.
