= Gonbad, Urmia =

Village in West Azerbaijan province, Iran

Gonbad Persian: گنبد
- Village
- Location within Iran
- Coordinates: 37°47′33″N 44°39′58″E
- Country: Iran
- Province: West Azerbaijan
- County: Urmia
- District: Sumay-ye Beradust
- Rural District: Beradust

Population (2016)
  - Total: 761
- Time zone: UTC+3:30 (IRST)

Gonbad (Persian: گنبد) (Note: In Armenian: Կումբաթ) is a village in Beradust Rural District of Sumay-ye Beradust District in Urmia County, West Azerbaijan province, Iran.

== Demographics ==
=== Population ===
At the time of the 2006 National Census, the village's population was 957 in 138 households. The following census in 2011 counted 749 people in 160 households. The 2016 census measured the population of the village as 761 people in 148 households.
