= Orosabad =

Village in Qazvin province, Iran

Orosabad Persian: اروس اباد
- Village
- Location within Iran
- Coordinates: 36°21′20″N 49°57′19″E
- Country: Iran
- Province: Qazvin
- County: Qazvin
- District: Central
- Rural District: Eqbal-e Gharbi

Population (2016)
  - Total: 742
- Time zone: UTC+3:30 (IRST)

Orosabad (Persian: اروس اباد) (Note: Also romanized as Oroos Abad, Orosābād, Orūsābād; also known as Owrosābād andUrusatabad) is a village in Eqbal-e Gharbi Rural District of the Central District in Qazvin County, Qazvin province, Iran.

== Demographics ==
=== Population ===
At the time of the 2006 National Census, the village's population was 723 in 145 households. The following census in 2011 counted 653 people in 193 households. The 2016 census measured the population of the village as 742 people in 211 households.
