= Hemmatabad, Qazvin =

Village in Qazvin province, Iran

Hemmatabad Persian: همت اباد
- Village
- Location within Iran
- Coordinates: 36°19′55″N 49°54′53″E
- Country: Iran
- Province: Qazvin
- County: Qazvin
- District: Central
- Rural District: Eqbal-e Gharbi

Population (2016)
  - Total: 748
- Time zone: UTC+3:30 (IRST)

Hemmatabad (Persian: همت اباد) (Note: Also romanized as Hemmatābād; also known as Himmatābād and Khimmatabad) is a village in Eqbal-e Gharbi Rural District of the Central District in Qazvin County, Qazvin province, Iran.

== Demographics ==
=== Population ===
At the time of the 2006 National Census, the village's population was 632 in 135 households. The following census in 2011 counted 756 people in 224 households. The 2016 census measured the population of the village as 748 people in 230 households.
