= Ashnestan =

Village in Qazvin province, Iran

Ashnestan Persian: اشنستان
- Village
- Location within Iran
- Coordinates: 36°17′09″N 50°10′59″E
- Country: Iran
- Province: Qazvin
- County: Qazvin
- District: Central
- Rural District: Eqbal-e Sharqi

Population (2016)
  - Total: 1,068
- Time zone: UTC+3:30 (IRST)

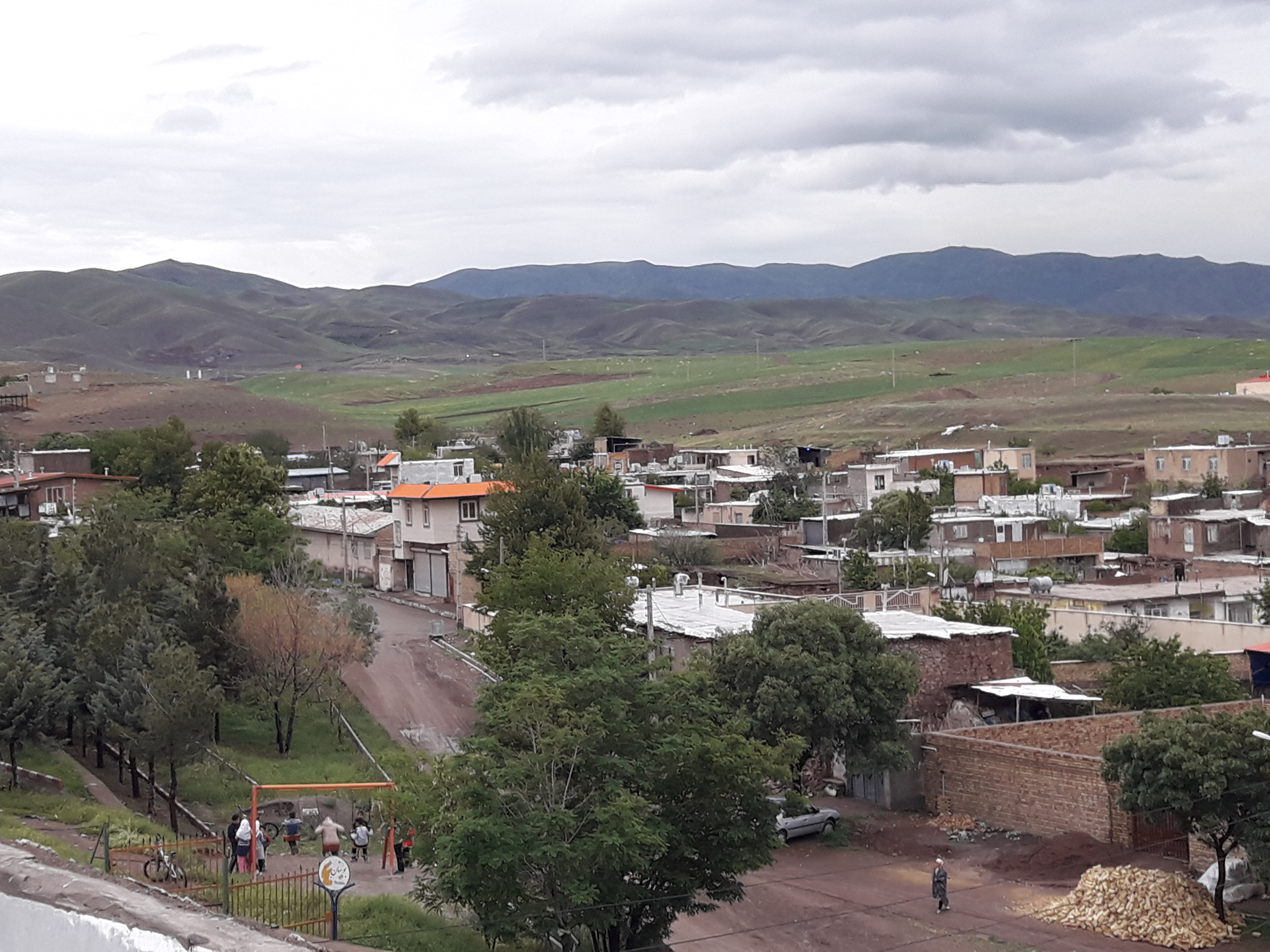

Ashnestan (Persian: اشنستان) (Note: Also romanized as Āshnestān; also known as Ashnistān) is a village in Eqbal-e Sharqi Rural District of the Central District in Qazvin County, Qazvin province, Iran.

== Demographics ==
=== Population ===
At the time of the 2006 National Census, the village's population was 1,292 in 313 households. The following census in 2011 counted 1,193 people in 352 households. The 2016 census measured the population of the village as 1,068 people in 329 households.
