= Zuyar =

Village in Qazvin province, Iran

Zuyar Persian: زويار
- Village
- Location within Iran
- Coordinates: 36°20′11″N 49°56′54″E
- Country: Iran
- Province: Qazvin
- County: Qazvin
- District: Central
- Rural District: Eqbal-e Gharbi

Population (2016)
  - Total: 888
- Time zone: UTC+3:30 (IRST)

Zuyar (Persian: زويار) (Note: Also romanized as Zūyār; also known as Zovān, Zūvār, and Zuwār) is a village in Eqbal-e Gharbi Rural District of the Central District in Qazvin County, Qazvin province, Iran.

== Demographics ==
=== Population ===
At the time of the 2006 National Census, the village's population was 820 in 177 households. The following census in 2011 counted 1,028 people in 292 households. The 2016 census measured the population of the village as 888 people in 271 households.
