= Jujahi =

Village in West Azerbaijan province, Iran

Jujahi Persian: جوجهي
- Village
- Location within Iran
- Coordinates: 37°51′23″N 44°33′49″E
- Country: Iran
- Province: West Azerbaijan
- County: Urmia
- District: Sumay-ye Beradust
- Rural District: Sumay-ye Jonubi

Population (2016)
  - Total: 1,041
- Time zone: UTC+3:30 (IRST)

Jujahi (Persian: جوجهي) (Note: Also romanized as Jūjahī) is a village in Sumay-ye Jonubi Rural District of Sumay-ye Beradust District in Urmia County, West Azerbaijan province, Iran.

== Demographics ==
=== Population ===
At the time of the 2006 National Census, the village's population was 920 in 129 households. The following census in 2011 counted 1,053 people in 209 households. The 2016 census measured the population of the village as 1,041 people in 229 households.
