= Kharah Gush =

Village in West Azerbaijan province, Iran

Kharah Gush Persian: خره گوش
- Village
- Location within Iran
- Coordinates: 37°53′43″N 44°35′43″E
- Country: Iran
- Province: West Azerbaijan
- County: Urmia
- District: Sumay-ye Beradust
- Rural District: Sumay-ye Jonubi

Population (2016)
  - Total: 831
- Time zone: UTC+3:30 (IRST)

Kharah Gush (Persian: خره گوش) (Note: Also romanized as Kharah Gūsh; also known as Kharāgūsh and Khargūsh) is a village in Sumay-ye Jonubi Rural District of Sumay-ye Beradust District in Urmia County, West Azerbaijan province, Iran.

== Demographics ==
=== Population ===
At the time of the 2006 National Census, the village's population was 1,002 in 163 households. The following census in 2011 counted 992 people in 192 households. The 2016 census measured the population of the village as 831 people in 178 households.
