= Nizamabad, Iran =

Nizamabad or Nezamabad (Persian: نظام اباد) in Iran may refer to:

- Nizamabad, Golestan, a city in Golestan Province, Iran
- Nizamabad, Kerman, a city in Kerman Province, Iran
- Nezamabad, Qazvin, a village in Qazvin Province, Iran
