= Kani Rash, Urmia =

Village in West Azerbaijan province, Iran

Kani Rash Persian: كاني رش
- Village
- Location within Iran
- Coordinates: 37°55′11″N 44°40′06″E
- Country: Iran
- Province: West Azerbaijan
- County: Urmia
- District: Sumay-ye Beradust
- Rural District: Sumay-ye Shomali

Population (2016)
  - Total: 529
- Time zone: UTC+3:30 (IRST)

Kani Rash (Persian: كاني رش) (Note: Also romanized as Kānī Rash) is a village in Sumay-ye Shomali Rural District of Sumay-ye Beradust District in Urmia County, West Azerbaijan province, Iran.

== Demographics ==
=== Population ===
At the time of the 2006 National Census, the village's population was 524 in 83 households. The following census in 2011 counted 548 people in 94 households. The 2016 census measured the population of the village as 529 people in 116 households.
