= Avdelan-e Olya =

Avdelan-e Olya اودلان عليا
- Village
- Location within Iran
- Coordinates: 37°46′00″N 44°50′00″E
- Country: Iran
- Province: West Azerbaijan
- County: Urmia
- Bakhsh: Sumay-ye Beradust
- Rural District: Beradust

Population (2006)
  - Total: 13
- Time zone: UTC+3:30 (IRST)
  - Summer (DST): UTC+4:30 (IRDT)

Avdelan-e Olya (Persian: اودلان عليا, also Romanized as Āvdelān-e ‘Olyā) is a village in Beradust Rural District, Sumay-ye Beradust District, Urmia County, West Azerbaijan Province, Iran. At the 2006 census, its population was 13, in 4 families.
