= Emamzadeh Abazar =

Village in Qazvin province, Iran

Emamzadeh Abazar Persian: امامزاده اباذر
- Village
- Location within Iran
- Coordinates: 36°18′26″N 50°11′49″E
- Country: Iran
- Province: Qazvin
- County: Qazvin
- District: Central
- Rural District: Eqbal-e Sharqi

Population (2016)
  - Total: 184
- Time zone: UTC+3:30 (IRST)

Emamzadeh Abazar (Persian: امامزاده اباذر) (Note: Also romanized as Emāmzādeh Ābāẕar) is a village in Eqbal-e Sharqi Rural District of the Central District in Qazvin County, Qazvin province, Iran.

== Demographics ==
=== Population ===
At the time of the 2006 National Census, the village's population was 241 in 60 households. The following census in 2011 counted 224 people in 65 households. The 2016 census measured the population of the village as 184 people in 53 households.
