= Najmabad, Qazvin =

Village in Qazvin province, Iran

Najmabad Persian: نجم اباد
- Village
- Location within Iran
- Coordinates: 36°22′09″N 49°58′37″E
- Country: Iran
- Province: Qazvin
- County: Qazvin
- District: Central
- Rural District: Eqbal-e Gharbi

Population (2016)
  - Total: 674
- Time zone: UTC+3:30 (IRST)

Najmabad (Persian: نجم اباد) (Note: Also romanized as Najmābād) is a village in Eqbal-e Gharbi Rural District of the Central District in Qazvin County, Qazvin province, Iran.

== Demographics ==
=== Population ===
At the time of the 2006 National Census, the village's population was 421 in 88 households. The following census in 2011 counted 687 people in 197 households. The 2016 census measured the population of the village as 674 people in 203 households.
