= Mehdiabad-e Bozorg =

Village in Qazvin province, Iran

Mehdiabad-e Bozorg Persian: مهدي ابادبزرگ
- Village
- Location within Iran
- Coordinates: 36°10′21″N 49°52′49″E
- Country: Iran
- Province: Qazvin
- County: Qazvin
- District: Central
- Rural District: Eqbal-e Gharbi

Population (2016)
  - Total: 1,494
- Time zone: UTC+3:30 (IRST)

Mehdiabad-e Bozorg (Persian: مهدي ابادبزرگ) (Note: Also romanized as Mehdīābād-e Bozorg; also known as Ḩājjīābād, Mehdīābād, Mekhtyabad, and Mihdiābād) is a village in Eqbal-e Gharbi Rural District of the Central District in Qazvin County, Qazvin province, Iran.

== Demographics ==
=== Population ===
At the time of the 2006 National Census, the village's population was 1,359 in 317 households. The following census in 2011 counted 1,534 people in 423 households. The 2016 census measured the population of the village as 1,494 people in 445 households.
