= Seydan, West Azerbaijan =

Village in West Azerbaijan province, Iran

Seydan Persian: سيدان
- Village
- Location within Iran
- Coordinates: 37°58′49″N 44°48′51″E
- Country: Iran
- Province: West Azerbaijan
- County: Urmia
- District: Sumay-ye Beradust
- Rural District: Sumay-ye Shomali

Population (2016)
  - Total: 1,160
- Time zone: UTC+3:30 (IRST)

Seydan (Persian: سيدان) (Note: Also romanized as Seydān) is a village in Sumay-ye Shomali Rural District of Sumay-ye Beradust District in Urmia County, West Azerbaijan province, Iran.

== Demographics ==
=== Population ===
At the time of the 2006 National Census, the village's population was 1,220 in 217 households. The following census in 2011 counted 1,160 people in 300 households. The 2016 census measured the population of the village as 1,160 people in 287 households.
