= Sheyd Isfahan =

Village in Qazvin province, Iran

Sheyd Isfahan Persian: شيداصفهان
- Village
- Location within Iran
- Coordinates: 36°14′03″N 49°50′59″E
- Country: Iran
- Province: Qazvin
- County: Qazvin
- District: Central
- Rural District: Eqbal-e Gharbi

Population (2016)
  - Total: 3,252
- Time zone: UTC+3:30 (IRST)

Sheyd Isfahan (Persian: شيداصفهان) (Note: Also romanized as Sheid Esfahan, Sheyd Esfahan, and Sheyd Eşfahān; also known as Shāh Eşfahān, Shashivan, Shāshiwān, Shāşofān, and Shīr Eşfahān) is a village in Eqbal-e Gharbi Rural District of the Central District in Qazvin County, Qazvin province, Iran.

== Demographics ==
=== Population ===
At the time of the 2006 National Census, the village's population was 2,695 in 724 households. The following census in 2011 counted 3,207 people in 952 households. The 2016 census measured the population of the village as 3,252 people in 978 households.
