= Hashtian =

Village in West Azerbaijan province, Iran

Hashtian Persian: هشتيان
- Village
- Location within Iran
- Coordinates: 37°52′01″N 44°40′23″E
- Country: Iran
- Province: West Azerbaijan
- County: Urmia
- District: Sumay-ye Beradust
- Rural District: Sumay-ye Jonubi

Population (2016)
  - Total: 776
- Time zone: UTC+3:30 (IRST)

Hashtian (Persian: هشتيان) (Note: Also romanized as Hashteyān, Hashtīān, and Hashtīyān; Armenian: Հաշտեան) is a village in, and the capital of, Sumay-ye Jonubi Rural District in Sumay-ye Beradust District of Urmia County, West Azerbaijan province, Iran. The previous capital of the rural district was the village of Hovarsin.

== Demographics ==
=== Population ===
At the time of the 2006 National Census, the village's population was 818 in 128 households. The following census in 2011 counted 908 people in 207 households. The 2016 census measured the population of the village as 776 people in 178 households.
