= Razjerd =

Village in Qazvin province, Iran

Razjerd Persian: رزجرد
- Village
- Location within Iran
- Coordinates: 36°21′04″N 50°10′37″E
- Country: Iran
- Province: Qazvin
- County: Qazvin
- District: Central
- Rural District: Eqbal-e Sharqi

Population (2016)
  - Total: 1,757
- Time zone: UTC+3:30 (IRST)

Razjerd (Persian: رزجرد) (Note: Also known as Vazjerd) is a village in Eqbal-e Sharqi Rural District of the Central District in Qazvin County, Qazvin province, Iran.

== Demographics ==
=== Population ===
At the time of the 2006 National Census, the village's population was 1,844 in 517 households. The following census in 2011 counted 2,021 people in 650 households. The 2016 census measured the population of the village as 1,757 people in 586 households.
