= Kharman Sukhteh, Qazvin =

Village in Qazvin province, Iran

Kharman Sukhteh Persian: خرمن سوخته
- Village
- Location within Iran
- Coordinates: 36°22′57″N 49°51′45″E
- Country: Iran
- Province: Qazvin
- County: Qazvin
- District: Central
- Rural District: Eqbal-e Gharbi

Population (2016)
  - Total: 1,944
- Time zone: UTC+3:30 (IRST)

Kharman Sukhteh (Persian: خرمن سوخته) (Note: Also romanized as Kharman Sūkhteh; also known as Sukhta-Khirman and Sūkhteh Kharman) is a village in Eqbal-e Gharbi Rural District of the Central District in Qazvin County, Qazvin province, Iran.

== Demographics ==
=== Population ===
At the time of the 2006 National Census, the village's population was 1,740 in 365 households. The following census in 2011 counted 1,931 people in 484 households. The 2016 census measured the population of the village as 1,944 people in 539 households.
