= Nezamabad, Qazvin =

Village in Qazvin province, Iran

Nezamabad Persian: نظام اباد
- Village
- Location within Iran
- Coordinates: 36°17′29″N 49°51′37″E
- Country: Iran
- Province: Qazvin
- County: Qazvin
- District: Central
- Rural District: Eqbal-e Gharbi

Population (2016)
  - Total: 3,857
- Time zone: UTC+3:30 (IRST)

Nezamabad (Persian: نظام اباد) (Note: Also romanized as Nez̧āmābād; also known as Nizamabad) is a village in, and the capital of, Eqbal-e Gharbi Rural District in the Central District of Qazvin County, Qazvin province, Iran.

== History ==
The original capital of the rural district in 1987 was the village of Naserabad, now a neighborhood in the city of Qazvin. In 1991, the capital was transferred to the village of Mahmudabad-e Nemuneh, now a city. The capital of the rural district passed again in 2000 to Nezamabad.

== Demographics ==
=== Population ===
At the time of the 2006 National Census, the village's population was 3,474 in 807 households. The following census in 2011 counted 3,975 people in 1,069 households. The 2016 census measured the population of the village as 3,857 people in 1,180 households. It was the most populous village in its rural district.
