= Hasanabad-e Kalej =

Village in Qazvin province, Iran

Hasanabad-e Kalej Persian: حسن‌آباد کلج
- Village
- Location within Iran
- Coordinates: 36°08′10″N 50°06′45″E
- Country: Iran
- Province: Qazvin
- County: Alborz
- District: Central
- Rural District: Nosratabad

Population (2016)
  - Total: 2,506
- Time zone: UTC+3:30 (IRST)

Hasanabad-e Kalej (Persian: حسن‌آباد کلج) (Note: Also romanized as Ḩasanābād-e Kale and Ḩasanābād-e Kalehj also known as Ḩasanābād) is a village in Nosratabad Rural District of the Central District in Alborz County, Qazvin province, Iran.

== Demographics ==
=== Population ===
At the time of the 2006 National Census, the village's population was 2,090 in 536 households, when it was in Basharyat-e Gharbi Rural District of Basharyat District in Abyek County. The following census in 2011 counted 2,477 people in 725 households, by which time it had been transferred to Nosratabad Rural District of the Central District in Alborz County. The 2016 census measured the population of the village as 2,506 people in 794 households.
