= Bachehjik =

Village in West Azerbaijan province, Iran

Bachehjik Persian: بچه جيك
- Village
- Location within Iran
- Coordinates: 37°52′45″N 44°45′22″E
- Country: Iran
- Province: West Azerbaijan
- County: Urmia
- District: Sumay-ye Beradust
- Rural District: Sumay-ye Shomali

Population (2016)
  - Total: 515
- Time zone: UTC+3:30 (IRST)

Bachehjik (Persian: بچه جيك) (Note: Also romanized as Bachehjīk; also known as Bachcheh Jīk) is a village in Sumay-ye Shomali Rural District of Sumay-ye Beradust District in Urmia County, West Azerbaijan province, Iran.

== Demographics ==
=== Population ===
At the time of the 2006 National Census, the village's population was 569 in 125 households. The following census in 2011 counted 540 people in 122 households. The 2016 census measured the population of the village as 515 people in 124 households.
