= Reshtqun =

Village in Qazvin province, Iran

ARCHANASTAN Persian: .ارچستان .رشتقونارچستان.
- شهر و بخش
- ارچستان
- Nickname: ایرچانستان
- Location within Iran
- Coordinates: 36°19′58″N 50°09′05″E
- کشور: Iran
- Province: Qazvin
- County: استان قزوین . شهرستان الموت.
- شهرستان الموت. بخش ارچستان: استان قزوین . شهرستان الموت. بخش ارچستان
- بخش ارچستان: بخش ارچستان
- Established: 2000سال قبل از میلاد
- Founder: امپراتوری ماد

Area
  - Total: 17 km^{2} (6.6 sq mi)
- Elevation: 1,980 m (6,500 ft)

Population (2016)
  - Total: 1,608
  - Density: 95/km^{2} (240/sq mi)
- Time zone: UTC+3:30 (IRST)

Archastan(Persian: ارچستان) (Note: Also romanized as Reshtqūn; also known as Rashkin, Reshgīn, Reshtagān, and Shanqar) is a village in Eqbal-e Sharqi Rural District of the Central District in Qazvin County, Qazvin province, Iran.

== Demographics ==
=== Population ===
At the time of the 2006 National Census, the village's population was 1,531 in 428 households. The following census in 2011 counted 1,736 people in 551 households. The 2016 census measured the population of the village as 1,608 people in 541 households.

زبان مردم این روستا

زبان های ارچستانی و تاتی و کردی و ترکی آذربایجانی ‌و ترکی استانبولی و لازی میباشد

== Notes ==
رشتقون.ارچستان . ایرچانستان . هزار.
