= Maluneh =

Village in West Azerbaijan province, Iran

Maluneh Persian: ملونه
- Village
- Location within Iran
- Coordinates: 37°41′00″N 44°42′09″E
- Country: Iran
- Province: West Azerbaijan
- County: Urmia
- District: Sumay-ye Beradust
- Rural District: Beradust

Population (2016)
  - Total: 508
- Time zone: UTC+3:30 (IRST)

Maluneh (Persian: ملونه) (Note: Also romanized as Malūneh; also known as Malūlān) is a village in Beradust Rural District of Sumay-ye Beradust District in Urmia County, West Azerbaijan province, Iran.

== Demographics ==
=== Population ===
At the time of the 2006 National Census, the village's population was 574 in 80 households. The following census in 2011 counted 498 people in 108 households. The 2016 census measured the population of the village as 508 people in 130 households.
