= Haftsaran =

Village in West Azerbaijan province, Iran

Haftsaran Persian: هفت ساران
- Village
- Location within Iran
- Coordinates: 37°41′26″N 44°40′21″E
- Country: Iran
- Province: West Azerbaijan
- County: Urmia
- District: Sumay-ye Beradust
- Rural District: Beradust

Population (2016)
  - Total: 430
- Time zone: UTC+3:30 (IRST)

Haftsaran (Persian: هفت ساران) (Note: Also romanized as Haftsārān; also known as Haftsār) is a village in Beradust Rural District of Sumay-ye Beradust District in Urmia County, West Azerbaijan province, Iran.

== Demographics ==
=== Population ===
At the time of the 2006 National Census, the village's population was 589 in 116 households. The following census in 2011 counted 572 people in 123 households. The 2016 census measured the population of the village as 430 people in 94 households.
