= Abdolabad, Qazvin =

Village in Qazvin province, Iran

Abdolabad Persian: عبدل اباد
- Village
- Location within Iran
- Coordinates: 36°21′05″N 50°07′22″E
- Country: Iran
- Province: Qazvin
- County: Qazvin
- District: Central
- Rural District: Eqbal-e Sharqi

Population (2016)
  - Total: 486
- Time zone: UTC+3:30 (IRST)

Abdolabad (Persian: عبدل اباد) (Note: Also romanized as ‘Abdolābād) is a village in Eqbal-e Sharqi Rural District of the Central District in Qazvin County, Qazvin province, Iran.

== Demographics ==
=== Population ===
At the time of the 2006 National Census, the village's population was 761 in 206 households. The following census in 2011 counted 684 people in 206 households. The 2016 census measured the population of the village as 486 people in 168 households.
