= Kuchařovice =

- Municipality
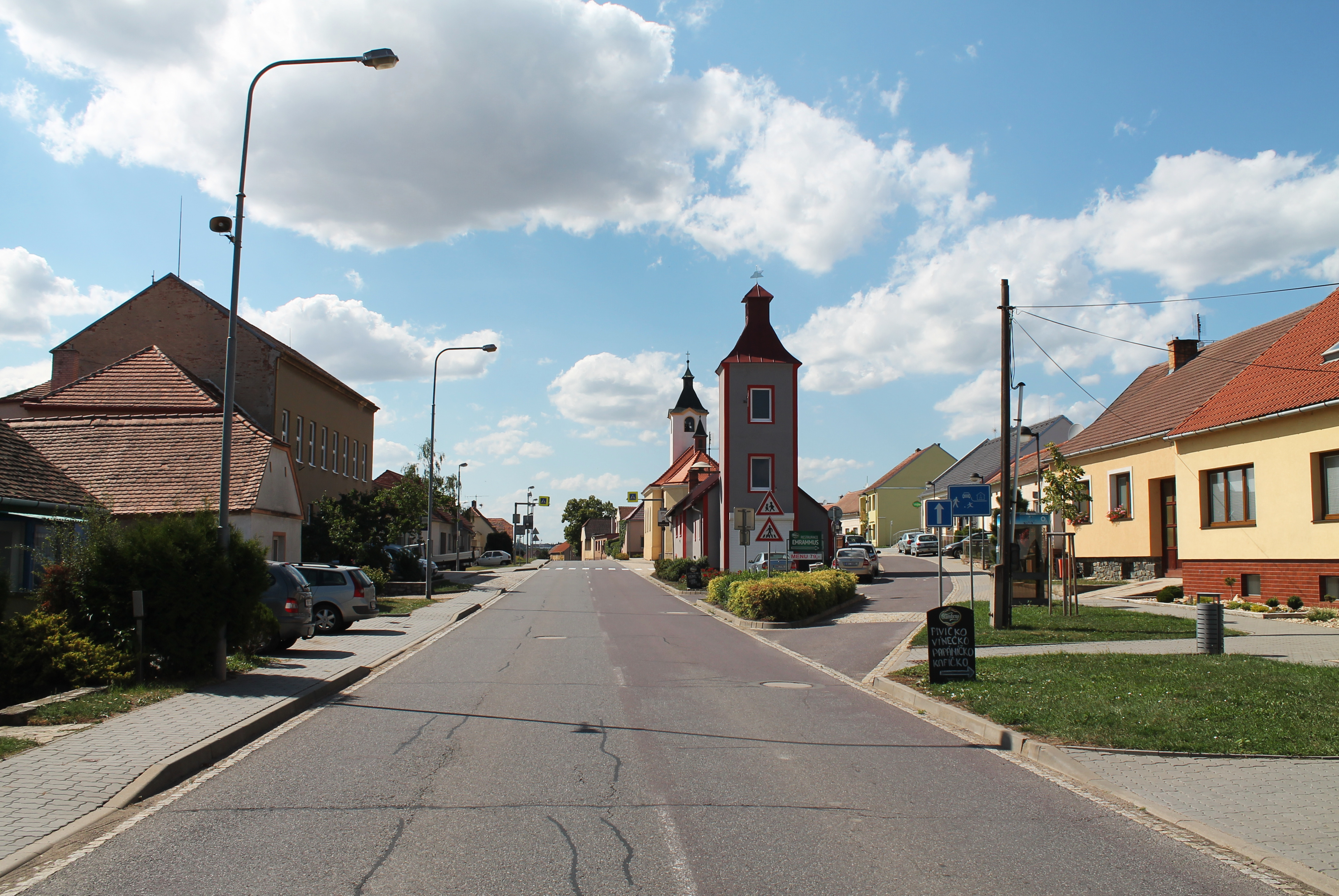
- Centre of Kuchařovice

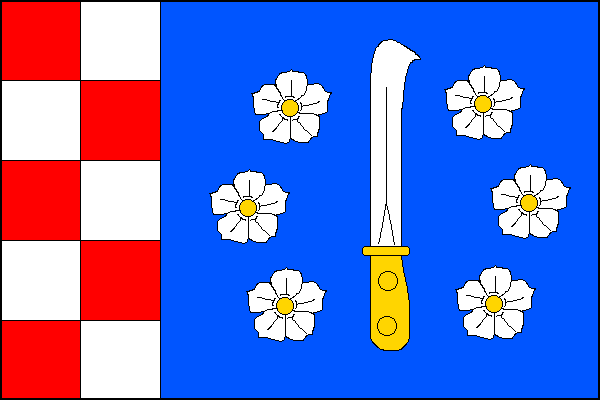
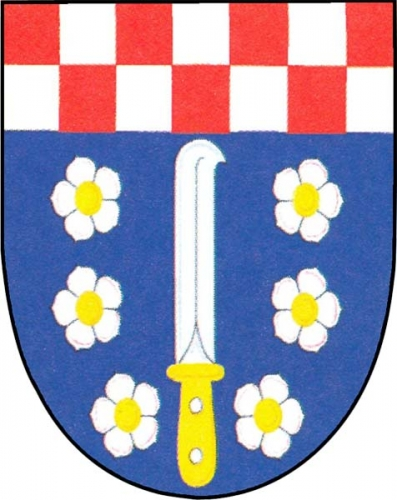
- Flag Coat of arms

- Location in the Czech Republic
- Coordinates: 48°52′34″N 16°4′37″E
- Country: Czech Republic
- Region: South Moravian
- District: Znojmo
- First mentioned: 1220

Area
  - Total: 7.60 km^{2} (2.93 sq mi)
- Elevation: 297 m (974 ft)

Population (2026-01-01)
  - Total: 916
  - Density: 121/km^{2} (312/sq mi)
- Time zone: UTC+1 (CET)
  - Summer (DST): UTC+2 (CEST)
- Postal code: 669 02
- Website: www.kucharovice.cz

Kuchařovice (German: Kukrowitz) is a municipality and village in Znojmo District in the South Moravian Region of the Czech Republic. It has about 900 inhabitants.

== Etymology ==
The name is derived from the personal name Kuchař, meaning "the village of Kuchař's people".

== Geography ==
Kuchařovice is located about 3 kilometres (1.9 mi) northeast of Znojmo and 52 km (32 mi) southwest of Brno. It liesin an agricultural landscape in the Jevišovice Uplands. The highest point is at 336 m (1,102 ft) above sea level. The stream Dobšický potok flows through the municipality.

=== Climate ===
Kuchařovice's climate is classified as humid continental climate (Köppen: Dfb; Trewartha: Dcbo). Among them, the annual average temperature is 9.6 °C (49.3 °F), the hottest month in July is 20.2 °C (68.4 °F), and the coldest month is −0.8 °C (30.6 °F) in January. The annual precipitation is 500.1 millimetres (19.69 in), of which June is the wettest with 67.4 millimetres (2.65 in), while February is the driest with only 17.3 millimetres (0.68 in). The extreme temperature throughout the year ranged from −24.2 °C (−11.6 °F) on 7 January 1985 to 38.4 °C (101.1 °F) on 1 July 2019.

Climate data for Kuchařovice, 1991–2020 normals, extremes 1961–present
Month	Jan	Feb	Mar	Apr	May	Jun	Jul	Aug	Sep	Oct	Nov	Dec	Year
Record high °C (°F)	16.4 (61.5)	18.0 (64.4)	24.6 (76.3)	28.1 (82.6)	32.4 (90.3)	36.1 (97.0)	38.4 (101.1)	37.9 (100.2)	34.1 (93.4)	27.9 (82.2)	20.0 (68.0)	14.2 (57.6)	38.4 (101.1)
Mean daily maximum °C (°F)	2.1 (35.8)	4.5 (40.1)	9.4 (48.9)	15.7 (60.3)	20.1 (68.2)	24.1 (75.4)	26.7 (80.1)	26.3 (79.3)	20.2 (68.4)	13.6 (56.5)	7.2 (45.0)	2.6 (36.7)	14.4 (57.9)
Daily mean °C (°F)	−0.8 (30.6)	0.6 (33.1)	4.6 (40.3)	10.1 (50.2)	14.6 (58.3)	18.2 (64.8)	20.2 (68.4)	19.8 (67.6)	14.7 (58.5)	9.3 (48.7)	4.2 (39.6)	0.0 (32.0)	9.6 (49.3)
Mean daily minimum °C (°F)	−3.3 (26.1)	−2.5 (27.5)	0.7 (33.3)	4.8 (40.6)	9.1 (48.4)	12.5 (54.5)	14.4 (57.9)	14.4 (57.9)	10.6 (51.1)	6.2 (43.2)	2.1 (35.8)	−2.1 (28.2)	5.6 (42.1)
Record low °C (°F)	−24.2 (−11.6)	−23.0 (−9.4)	−18.8 (−1.8)	−6.4 (20.5)	−2.0 (28.4)	1.0 (33.8)	4.7 (40.5)	4.0 (39.2)	−1.0 (30.2)	−6.0 (21.2)	−12.8 (9.0)	−21.7 (−7.1)	−24.2 (−11.6)
Average precipitation mm (inches)	21.3 (0.84)	17.3 (0.68)	30.0 (1.18)	30.4 (1.20)	58.8 (2.31)	67.4 (2.65)	66.3 (2.61)	65.6 (2.58)	55.1 (2.17)	34.1 (1.34)	29.2 (1.15)	24.8 (0.98)	500.1 (19.69)
Average snowfall cm (inches)	10.7 (4.2)	7.3 (2.9)	5.5 (2.2)	0.3 (0.1)	0.0 (0.0)	0.0 (0.0)	0.0 (0.0)	0.0 (0.0)	0.0 (0.0)	trace	3.1 (1.2)	7.9 (3.1)	34.9 (13.7)
Average precipitation days (≥ 1.0 mm)	5.5	4.5	6.3	5.9	8.4	8.3	9.3	7.9	6.6	6.5	6.3	6.1	81.6
Average relative humidity (%)	83.2	77.4	71.5	63.7	66.3	66.0	63.0	64.2	71.7	80.2	85.8	85.7	73.2
Mean monthly sunshine hours	62.2	95.2	145.1	205.2	234.6	243.8	252.3	248.1	178.6	118.2	58.1	50.4	1,892
Source 1: NOAA
Source 2: Czech Hydrometeorological Institute

== History ==
The first written mention of Kuchařovice is from 1220.

== Demographics ==
Historical population

Year	Pop.	±%
1869	680	—
1880	654	−3.8%
1890	705	+7.8%
1900	826	+17.2%
1910	848	+2.7%

Year	Pop.	±%
1921	848	+0.0%
1930	883	+4.1%
1950	876	−0.8%
1961	907	+3.5%
1970	890	−1.9%

Year	Pop.	±%
1980	874	−1.8%
1991	793	−9.3%
2001	906	+14.2%
2011	957	+5.6%
2021	881	−7.9%

Source: Censuses

== Transport ==
There are no railways or major roads passing through the municipality.

== Sights ==
Among the protected cultural monuments are a late Baroque statue of Saint John of Nepomuk from 1779 and a late Baroque column with the scultural group of the Holy Trinity, created around 1800.

The main landmark of Kuchařovice is the Chapel of Saint Florian, built in 1932.
