= Kansi =

Kansi may refer to:

== People ==
- Kasi (tribe)
- Mir Aimal Kansi (1964–2002), Pakistani perpetrator of the 1993 shootings at CIA Headquarters

== Places ==
- Kansi, Iran, a village in West Azerbaijan Province, Iran
- Kansi, Shan State, a village in Taunggyi Township, of Shan State in Burma (Myanmar)
- Kansi, Kachin State, a village in Hpakant Township, of Kachin State in Burma (Myanmar)

== Food ==
- Cansi, a Filipino bone marrow soup
