= Naserabad, Qazvin =

Neighborhood in Qazvin province, Iran

Naserabad Persian: ناصراباد
- Neighborhood
- Location within Iran
- Coordinates: 36°18′23″N 49°56′44″E
- Country: Iran
- Province: Qazvin
- County: Qazvin
- District: Central
- City: Qazvin

Population (2011)
  - Total: 7,954
- Time zone: UTC+3:30 (IRST)

Naserabad (Persian: ناصراباد) (Note: Also romanized as Nāşerābād; also known as Nasirabad) is a neighborhood in the city of Qazvin in the Central District of Qazvin County, Qazvin province, Iran.

== History ==
As a village it was the original capital of Eqbal-e Gharbi Rural District in 1987 until 1991 when its capital was transferred to the village of Mahmudabad-e Nemuneh, now a city. The capital of the rural district passed again in 2000 to the village of Nezamabad.

== Demographics ==
=== Population ===
At the time of the 2006 National Census, Naserabad's population was 2,748 in 649 households, when it was a village in Eqbal-e Gharbi Rural District. The following census in 2011 counted 7,954 people in 2,207 households. The village was annexed to the city of Qazvin in 2015.
