= Charis, Iran =

Village in Qazvin province, Iran

Charis Persian: چاريس
- Village
- Location within Iran
- Coordinates: 36°21′50″N 49°52′39″E
- Country: Iran
- Province: Qazvin
- County: Qazvin
- District: Central
- Rural District: Eqbal-e Gharbi

Population (2016)
  - Total: 770
- Time zone: UTC+3:30 (IRST)

Charis (Persian: چاريس) (Note: Also romanized as Chārīs; also known as Chārīz) is a village in Eqbal-e Gharbi Rural District of the Central District in Qazvin County, Qazvin province, Iran.

== Demographics ==
=== Population ===
At the time of the 2006 National Census, the village's population was 790 in 177 households. The following census in 2011 counted 844 people in 228 households. The 2016 census measured the population of the village as 770 people in 219 households.
