= Mastakan, Beradust =

Mastakan مستكان
- Village
- Location within Iran
- Coordinates: 37°42′44″N 44°42′21″E
- Country: Iran
- Province: West Azerbaijan
- County: Urmia
- Bakhsh: Sumay-ye Beradust
- Rural District: Beradust

Population (2006)
  - Total: 234
- Time zone: UTC+3:30 (IRST)
  - Summer (DST): UTC+4:30 (IRDT)

Mastakan (Persian: مستكان, also Romanized as Mastakān; also known as Māstakān-e Barādūst) is a village in Beradust Rural District, Sumay-ye Beradust District, Urmia County, West Azerbaijan Province, Iran. At the 2006 census, its population was 234, in 37 families.
