= Sufian, Urmia =

Village in West Azerbaijan province, Iran

Sufian Persian: صوفيان
- Village
- Location within Iran
- Coordinates: 37°53′51″N 44°40′13″E
- Country: Iran
- Province: West Azerbaijan
- County: Urmia
- District: Sumay-ye Beradust
- Rural District: Sumay-ye Jonubi

Population (2016)
  - Total: 687
- Time zone: UTC+3:30 (IRST)

Sufian (Persian: صوفيان) (Note: Also romanized as Şūfīān) is a village in Sumay-ye Jonubi Rural District of Sumay-ye Beradust District in Urmia County, West Azerbaijan province, Iran.

== Demographics ==
=== Population ===
At the time of the 2006 National Census, the village's population was 732 in 112 households. The following census in 2011 counted 740 people in 137 households. The 2016 census measured the population of the village as 687 people in 137 households.
