= Hamidabad, Qazvin =

Village in Qazvin province, Iran

Hamidabad Persian: حميداباد
- Village
- Location within Iran
- Coordinates: 36°15′49″N 50°08′16″E
- Country: Iran
- Province: Qazvin
- County: Qazvin
- District: Central
- Rural District: Eqbal-e Sharqi

Population (2016)
  - Total: 932
- Time zone: UTC+3:30 (IRST)

Hamidabad (Persian: حميداباد) (Note: Also romanized as Ḩamīdābād; Azerbaijani: Həmidabad) is a village in Eqbal-e Sharqi Rural District of the Central District in Qazvin County, Qazvin province, Iran.

== Demographics ==
=== Ethnicity ===
The village is populated by Azerbaijani Turks.

=== Population ===
At the time of the 2006 National Census, the village's population was 799 in 212 households. The following census in 2011 counted 1,079 people in 329 households. The 2016 census measured the population of the village as 932 people in 287 households.
