= Mamakan, Sumay-ye Beradust =

Village in West Azerbaijan province, Iran

Mamakan Persian: ممكان
- Village
- Location within Iran
- Coordinates: 37°59′19″N 44°46′17″E
- Country: Iran
- Province: West Azerbaijan
- County: Urmia
- District: Sumay-ye Beradust
- Rural District: Sumay-ye Shomali

Population (2016)
  - Total: 1,685
- Time zone: UTC+3:30 (IRST)

Mamakan (Persian: ممكان) (Note: Also romanized as Mamakān; Armenian: Մամաքան) is a village in, and the capital of, Sumay-ye Shomali Rural District in Sumay-ye Beradust District of Urmia County, West Azerbaijan province, Iran.

== Demographics ==
=== Population ===
At the time of the 2006 National Census, the village's population was 1,457 in 245 households. The following census in 2011 counted 1,636 people in 393 households. The 2016 census measured the population of the village as 1,685 people in 398 households. It was the most populous village in its rural district.
