= Dastjerd-e Olya =

Village in Qazvin province, Iran

Dastjerd-e Olya Persian: دستجردعليا
- Village
- Location within Iran
- Coordinates: 36°19′06″N 50°15′11″E
- Country: Iran
- Province: Qazvin
- County: Qazvin
- District: Central
- Rural District: Eqbal-e Sharqi

Population (2016)
  - Total: 281
- Time zone: UTC+3:30 (IRST)

Dastjerd-e Olya (Persian: دستجردعليا) (Note: Also romanized as Dastjerd-e ‘Olyā; also known as Dastjerd and Dastjird) is a village in Eqbal-e Sharqi Rural District of the Central District in Qazvin County, Qazvin province, Iran.

== Demographics ==
=== Population ===
At the time of the 2006 National Census, the village's population was 647 in 155 households. The following census in 2011 counted 539 people in 163 households. The 2016 census measured the population of the village as 281 people in 108 households.
