= Kamalabad, Alborz =

Village in Qazvin province, Iran

Kamalabad Persian: كمال اباد
- Village
- Location within Iran
- Coordinates: 36°08′27″N 50°03′27″E
- Country: Iran
- Province: Qazvin
- County: Alborz
- District: Central
- Rural District: Nosratabad

Population (2016)
  - Total: 2,802
- Time zone: UTC+3:30 (IRST)

Kamalabad (Persian: كمال اباد) (Note: Also romanized as Kamālābād) is a village in, and the capital of, Nosratabad Rural District in the Central District of Alborz County, Qazvin province, Iran. The previous capital of the rural district was the village of Nosratabad.

== Demographics ==
=== Population ===
At the time of the 2006 National Census, the village's population was 2,358 in 564 households. The following census in 2011 counted 2,786 people in 796 households. The 2016 census measured the population of the village as 2,802 people in 854 households. It was the most populous village in its rural district.
