= Jalqaran =

Village in West Azerbaijan province, Iran

Jalqaran Persian: جلقران
- Village
- Location within Iran
- Coordinates: 37°48′55″N 44°39′50″E
- Country: Iran
- Province: West Azerbaijan
- County: Urmia
- District: Sumay-ye Beradust
- Rural District: Sumay-ye Jonubi

Population (2016)
  - Total: 580
- Time zone: UTC+3:30 (IRST)

Jalqaran (Persian: جلقران) (Note: Also romanized as Jalqarān) is a village in Sumay-ye Jonubi Rural District of Sumay-ye Beradust District in Urmia County, West Azerbaijan province, Iran.

== Demographics ==
=== Population ===
At the time of the 2006 National Census, the village's population was 736 in 107 households. The following census in 2011 counted 816 people in 193 households. The 2016 census measured the population of the village as 580 people in 98 households.
