= Manbareh =

Village in Qazvin province, Iran

Manbareh Persian: منبره
- Village
- Location within Iran
- Coordinates: 36°04′22″N 50°03′36″E
- Country: Iran
- Province: Qazvin
- County: Alborz
- District: Central
- Rural District: Nosratabad

Population (2016)
  - Total: 113
- Time zone: UTC+3:30 (IRST)

Manbareh (Persian: منبره) is a village in Nosratabad Rural District of the Central District in Alborz County, Qazvin province, Iran.

== Demographics ==
=== Population ===
At the time of the 2006 National Census, the village's population was 86 in 20 households. The following census in 2011 counted 82 people in 23 households. The 2016 census measured the population of the village as 113 people in 42 households.
