= Avdelan-e Sofla =

Avdelan-e Sofla اودلان سفلي
- Village
- Location within Iran
- Coordinates: 37°45′39″N 44°50′41″E
- Country: Iran
- Province: West Azerbaijan
- County: Urmia
- Bakhsh: Sumay-ye Beradust
- Rural District: Beradust

Population (2006)
  - Total: 276
- Time zone: UTC+3:30 (IRST)
  - Summer (DST): UTC+4:30 (IRDT)

Avdelan-e Sofla (Persian: اودلان سفلي, also Romanized as Āvdelān-e Soflá; also known as Ābdīlān) is a village in Beradust Rural District, Sumay-ye Beradust District, Urmia County, West Azerbaijan Province, Iran. At the 2006 census, its population was 276, in 45 families.
