= Bavan, Sumay-ye Beradust =

Village in West Azerbaijan province, Iran

Bavan Persian: باوان
- Village
- Location within Iran
- Coordinates: 37°50′16″N 44°43′30″E
- Country: Iran
- Province: West Azerbaijan
- County: Urmia
- District: Sumay-ye Beradust
- Rural District: Sumay-ye Jonubi

Population (2016)
  - Total: 1,098
- Time zone: UTC+3:30 (IRST)

Bavan (Persian: باوان) (Note: Also romanized as Bāvān) is a village in Sumay-ye Jonubi Rural District of Sumay-ye Beradust District in Urmia County, West Azerbaijan province, Iran.

== Demographics ==
=== Population ===
At the time of the 2006 National Census, the village's population was 1,040 in 181 households. The following census in 2011 counted 1,236 people in 261 households. The 2016 census measured the population of the village as 1,098 people in 235 households.
