= Shinqar =

Village in Qazvin province, Iran

Shinqar Persian: شينقر
- Village
- Location within Iran
- Coordinates: 36°17′17″N 50°08′09″E
- Country: Iran
- Province: Qazvin
- County: Qazvin
- District: Central
- Rural District: Eqbal-e Sharqi

Population (2016)
  - Total: 1,823
- Time zone: UTC+3:30 (IRST)

Shinqar (Persian: شينقر) (Note: Also romanized as Shīnqar) is a village in Eqbal-e Sharqi Rural District of the Central District in Qazvin County, Qazvin province, Iran.

== Demographics ==
=== Population ===
At the time of the 2006 National Census, the village's population was 1,647 in 443 households. The following census in 2011 counted 2,137 people in 631 households. The 2016 census measured the population of the village as 1,823 people in 558 households. It was the most populous village in its rural district.
