= Ardabilak =

Village in Qazvin province, Iran

Ardabilak Persian: اردبيلک
- Village
- Location within Iran
- Coordinates: 36°23′54″N 49°59′52″E
- Country: Iran
- Province: Qazvin
- County: Qazvin
- District: Central
- Rural District: Eqbal-e Gharbi

Population (2016)
  - Total: 720
- Time zone: UTC+3:30 (IRST)

Ardabilak (Persian: اردبيلک) (Note: Also romanized as Ardabīlak; also known as Ardāvīlāq) is a village in Eqbal-e Gharbi Rural District of the Central District in Qazvin County, Qazvin province, Iran.

== Demographics ==
=== Population ===
At the time of the 2006 National Census, the village's population was 801 in 231 households. The following census in 2011 counted 761 people in 241 households. The 2016 census measured the population of the village as 720 people in 249 households.
