= Aranjak =

Village in Qazvin province, Iran

Aranjak Persian: ارنجك
- Village
- Location within Iran
- Coordinates: 36°17′32″N 50°02′33″E
- Country: Iran
- Province: Qazvin
- County: Qazvin
- District: Central
- Rural District: Eqbal-e Sharqi

Population (2016)
  - Total: 113
- Time zone: UTC+3:30 (IRST)

Aranjak (Persian: ارنجك) is a village in Eqbal-e Sharqi Rural District of the Central District in Qazvin County, Qazvin province, Iran.

== Demographics ==
=== Population ===
At the time of the 2006 National Census, the village's population was 179 in 49 households. The following census in 2011 counted 121 people in 33 households. The 2016 census measured the population of the village as 113 people in 35 households.
