= Neychalan =

Village in West Azerbaijan province, Iran

Neychalan Persian: ني چالان
- Village
- Location within Iran
- Coordinates: 37°41′N 44°45′E
- Country: Iran
- Province: West Azerbaijan
- County: Urmia
- District: Sumay-ye Beradust
- Rural District: Beradust

Population (2016)
  - Total: 478
- Time zone: UTC+3:30 (IRST)

Neychalan (Persian: ني چالان) (Note: Also romanized as Neychālān and Neychalān) is a village in Beradust Rural District of Sumay-ye Beradust District in Urmia County, West Azerbaijan province, Iran.

== Demographics ==
=== Population ===
At the time of the 2006 National Census, the village's population was 616 in 105 households. The following census in 2011 counted 531 people in 117 households. The 2016 census measured the population of the village as 478 people in 102 households.
