= Farsian, Qazvin =

Village in Qazvin province, Iran

Farsian Persian: فارسيان
- Village
- Location within Iran
- Coordinates: 36°09′37″N 49°56′06″E
- Country: Iran
- Province: Qazvin
- County: Qazvin
- District: Central
- Rural District: Eqbal-e Gharbi

Population (2016)
  - Total: 3,473
- Time zone: UTC+3:30 (IRST)

Farsian (Persian: فارسيان) (Note: Also romanized as Fārseyān, Fārsīān, and Fārsīyān; also known as Parsian and Parsiyān) is a village in Eqbal-e Gharbi Rural District of the Central District in Qazvin County, Qazvin province, Iran.

== Demographics ==
=== Population ===
At the time of the 2006 National Census, the village's population was 2,628 in 630 households. The following census in 2011 counted 3,285 people in 898 households. The 2016 census measured the population of the village as 3,473 people in 1,002 households.
