= Alulak =

Village in Qazvin province, Iran

Alulak Persian: الولک
- Village
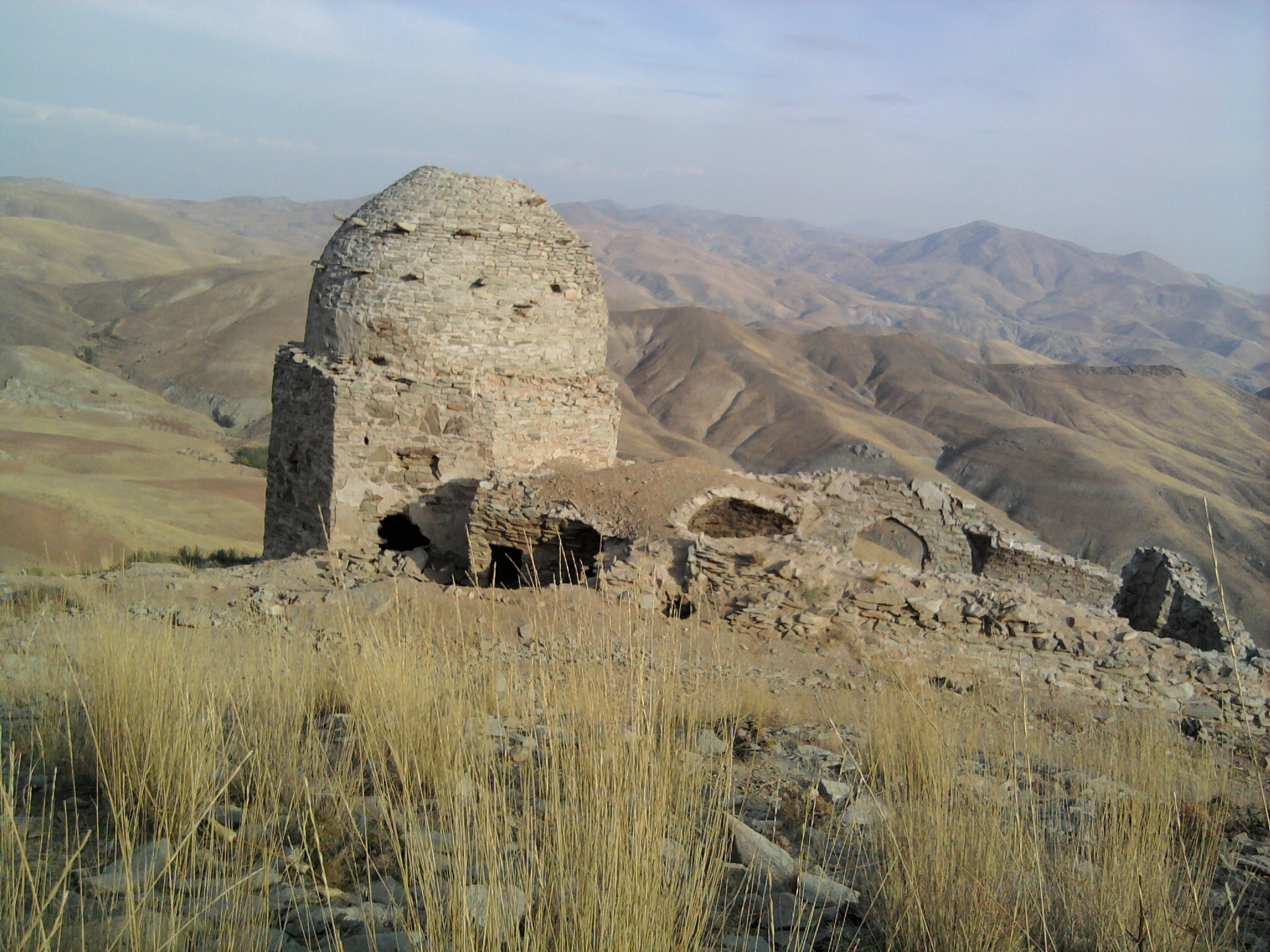
- Mausoleum of Soltan Veys

- Location within Iran
- Coordinates: 36°25′11″N 50°01′41″E
- Country: Iran
- Province: Qazvin
- County: Qazvin
- District: Central
- Rural District: Eqbal-e Gharbi

Population (2016)
  - Total: 702
- Time zone: UTC+3:30 (IRST)

Alulak (Persian: الولک) (Note: Also romanized as Ālūlak) is a village in Eqbal-e Gharbi Rural District of the Central District in Qazvin County, Qazvin province, Iran. Alulak is the largest village in the foothills of Qazvin and also has historical monuments such as Soltan Qeys (or Soltan Veys) and Kafir Gonbad. The village is approximately 12km north of Qazvin province. In the foothills of mountain Sultan Owais.

== Etymology ==
Regarding the naming of Alulak, or what Alulak means, it should be said that lak means fruit reaching its full ripeness. In fact, when the fruit is on the verge of falling, meaning it has reached full ripeness, considering that people used to come to this area when the apricot fruit reached this stage, as it was a lush green place with many fruit orchards. Therefore, this place became known as Alulak and has remained so to this day.

== History ==
Alulak is filled with historical venues and rich culture and history behind it. Among all of them the most famous ones are Kafir Gonbad, Mausoleum of Sultan Owais (Weiss) which was built in respect of Owals Al-Qarni. Also the famous Alulak's water mill is another famous venues of Alulak about one kilometer from the village, there is a living water mill, which is about 480-500 years old. In the past, there were about 25 water mills in this area, where people from nearby villages used to return to grind wheat and barley. There are various natural attractions in this village that have not yet been registered nationally.

== Demographics ==
=== Language ===
People of this village mostly speak the Tati language, a Northwestern Iranian language spoken in Iran. For the Southwestern Iranian language spoken in the Caucasus.

=== Population ===
At the time of the 2006 National Census, the village's population was 819 in 201 households. The following census in 2011 counted 672 people in 209 households. The 2016 census measured the population of the village as 702 people in 259 households.

== Climate ==
Alulak is located in the Central Plateau of Iran and has a mountainous climate with moderate summers and cold winters. The majority of rainfall occurs mainly in the autumn, winter, and spring seasons, along with other climatic factors, providing relatively favorable conditions for settlement, agriculture, and other human activities.

Humidity Levels in Alulak:

- Maximum relative humidity: 6.5 in the morning to 68 percent.
- Average maximum relative humidity: 12.5 with an average of 41.5 percent.

The average annual rainfall in the mentioned village area during the specified period is 316 millimeters.

== Agriculture ==
Horticulture, animal husbandry and agriculture are the most important jobs in this area. Products such as single-seeded cherries, local cherries, transplanted cherries, walnuts, almonds, grapes, wheat, barley, etc., which are among the main products of this region.
