= Firuzian =

Village in West Azerbaijan province, Iran

Firuzian Persian: فيروزيان
- Village
- Location within Iran
- Coordinates: 37°48′30″N 44°35′44″E
- Country: Iran
- Province: West Azerbaijan
- County: Urmia
- District: Sumay-ye Beradust
- Rural District: Beradust

Population (2016)
  - Total: 479
- Time zone: UTC+3:30 (IRST)

Firuzian (Persian: فيروزيان) (Note: Also romanized as Fīrūzīān; also known as Farīzbān and Ferīzīān) is a village in Beradust Rural District of Sumay-ye Beradust District in Urmia County, West Azerbaijan province, Iran.

== Demographics ==
=== Population ===
At the time of the 2006 National Census, the village's population was 452 in 77 households. The following census in 2011 counted 517 people in 108 households. The 2016 census measured the population of the village as 479 people in 92 households.
