= Pir Yusefian =

Village in Qazvin province, Iran

Pir Yusefian Persian: پيريوسفيان
- Village
- Location within Iran
- Coordinates: 36°09′35″N 50°01′25″E
- Country: Iran
- Province: Qazvin
- County: Alborz
- District: Central
- Rural District: Pir Yusefian

Population (2016)
  - Total: 4,071
- Time zone: UTC+3:30 (IRST)

Pir Yusefian (Persian: پيريوسفيان) (Note: Also romanized as Pīr Yūsefīān and Pīr Yūsefīyān) is a village in, and the capital of, Pir Yusefian Rural District in the Central District of Alborz County, Qazvin province, Iran.

== Demographics ==
=== Population ===
At the time of the 2006 National Census, the village's population was 3,816 in 890 households. The following census in 2011 counted 4,020 people in 1,115 households. The 2016 census measured the population of the village as 4,071 people in 1,211 households. It was the most populous village in its rural district.
