= Mianbar, Qazvin =

Village in Qazvin province, Iran

Mianbar Persian: ميان بر
- Village
- Location within Iran
- Coordinates: 36°17′57″N 50°08′48″E
- Country: Iran
- Province: Qazvin
- County: Qazvin
- District: Central
- Rural District: Eqbal-e Sharqi

Population (2016)
  - Total: 399
- Time zone: UTC+3:30 (IRST)

Mianbar (Persian: ميان بر) (Note: Also romanized as Mīānbar) is a village in Eqbal-e Sharqi Rural District of the Central District in Qazvin County, Qazvin province, Iran.

== Demographics ==
=== Population ===
At the time of the 2006 National Census, the village's population was 404 in 116 households. The following census in 2011 counted 410 people in 129 households. The 2016 census measured the population of the village as 399 people in 126 households.
