= Juhni =

Village in West Azerbaijan province, Iran

Juhni Persian: جوهني
- Village
- Location within Iran
- Coordinates: 37°50′42″N 44°39′00″E
- Country: Iran
- Province: West Azerbaijan
- County: Urmia
- District: Sumay-ye Beradust
- Rural District: Sumay-ye Jonubi

Population (2016)
  - Total: 716
- Time zone: UTC+3:30 (IRST)

Juhni (Persian: جوهني) (Note: Also romanized as Jūhnī; also known as Johnī and Jūnī; in Armenian: Ջոհնի) is a village in Sumay-ye Jonubi Rural District of Sumay-ye Beradust District in Urmia County, West Azerbaijan province, Iran.

== Demographics ==
=== Population ===
At the time of the 2006 National Census, the village's population was 644 in 102 households. The following census in 2011 counted 776 people in 191 households. The 2016 census measured the population of the village as 716 people in 158 households.
