= Mahmudabad-e Alam Khani =

Village in Qazvin province, Iran

Mahmudabad-e Alam Khani Persian: محمودابادعلم خاني
- Village
- Location within Iran
- Coordinates: 36°21′11″N 49°50′41″E
- Country: Iran
- Province: Qazvin
- County: Qazvin
- District: Central
- Rural District: Eqbal-e Gharbi

Population (2016)
  - Total: 1,635
- Time zone: UTC+3:30 (IRST)

Mahmudabad-e Alam Khani (Persian: محمودابادعلم خاني) (Note: Also romanized as Maḩmūdābād-e ‘Alam Khānī; also known as Maḩmūdābād) is a village in Eqbal-e Gharbi Rural District of the Central District in Qazvin County, Qazvin province, Iran.

== Demographics ==
=== Population ===
At the time of the 2006 National Census, the village's population was 1,163 in 264 households. The following census in 2011 counted 1,565 people in 448 households. The 2016 census measured the population of the village as 1,635 people in 493 households.
