= Ravand-e Sofla =

Village in West Azerbaijan province, Iran

Ravand-e Sofla Persian: روند سفلي
- Village
- Location within Iran
- Coordinates: 37°43′10″N 44°43′32″E
- Country: Iran
- Province: West Azerbaijan
- County: Urmia
- District: Sumay-ye Beradust
- Rural District: Beradust

Population (2016)
  - Total: 175
- Time zone: UTC+3:30 (IRST)

Ravand-e Sofla (Persian: روند سفلي) (Note: Also romanized as Ravand-e Soflá; also known as Ravand-e Pā’īn) is a village in, and the capital of, Beradust Rural District in Sumay-ye Beradust District of Urmia County, West Azerbaijan province, Iran.

== Demographics ==
=== Ethnicity ===
The village is populated by Kurds.

=== Population ===
At the time of the 2006 National Census, the village's population was 111 in 21 households. The following census in 2011 counted 80 people in 20 households. The 2016 census measured the population of the village as 175 people in 18 households.
