= Kuchar (surname) =

Kuchar is a Slavic language surname. It may refer to:

- Kuchař (surname), a version with diacritics
- Dennis Kuchar (born 1956), an Australian cardiologist
- George Kuchar (1942–2011), an American film director
- Matt Kuchar (born 1978), an American professional golfer
- Mike Kuchar (born 1942), an American filmmaker and actor
- Tadeusz Kuchar (1891–1966), a Polish sportsperson
- Theodore Kuchar (born 1963), a Ukrainian-American conductor of classical music
- Wacław Kuchar (1897–1981), a Polish sportsperson
