= Ravand-e Olya, West Azerbaijan =

Ravand-e Olya روندعليا
- Village
- Location within Iran
- Coordinates: 37°43′30″N 44°43′21″E
- Country: Iran
- Province: West Azerbaijan
- County: Urmia
- Bakhsh: Sumay-ye Beradust
- Rural District: Beradust

Population (2006)
  - Total: 109
- Time zone: UTC+3:30 (IRST)
  - Summer (DST): UTC+4:30 (IRDT)

Ravand-e Olya (Persian: روندعليا, also Romanized as Ravand-e ‘Olyā; also known as Ravand-e Bālā) is a village in Beradust Rural District, Sumay-ye Beradust District, Urmia County, West Azerbaijan Province, Iran. As of the 2006 census, its population was 109, in 22 families.
