= Kanisi =

Kanisi كنيسي
- Village
- Location within Iran
- Coordinates: 37°47′42″N 44°37′52″E
- Country: Iran
- Province: West Azerbaijan
- County: Urmia
- Bakhsh: Sumay-ye Beradust
- Rural District: Beradust

Population (2006)
  - Total: 473
- Time zone: UTC+3:30 (IRST)
  - Summer (DST): UTC+4:30 (IRDT)

Kanisi (Persian: كنيسي, also Romanized as Kanīsī; also known as Kānespī, Kānsī, and Kīnesī) is a village in Beradust Rural District, Sumay-ye Beradust District, Urmia County, West Azerbaijan Province, Iran. At the 2006 census, its population was 473, in 73 families.
