= Sumay-ye Shomali Rural District =

Rural district in West Azerbaijan province, Iran

Sumay-ye Shomali Rural District Persian: دهستان صومائ شمالي
- Rural District
- Location within Iran
- Coordinates: 37°58′N 44°46′E
- Country: Iran
- Province: West Azerbaijan
- County: Urmia
- District: Sumay-ye Beradust
- Established: 1987
- Capital: Mamakan

Population (2016)
  - Total: 9,570
- Time zone: UTC+3:30 (IRST)

Sumay-ye Shomali Rural District (Persian: دهستان صومائ شمالي) is in Sumay-ye Beradust District of Urmia County, West Azerbaijan province, Iran. Its capital is the village of Mamakan.

== Demographics ==
=== Population ===
At the time of the 2006 National Census, the rural district's population was 10,613 in 1,845 households. There were 10,018 inhabitants in 2,187 households at the following census of 2011. The 2016 census measured the population of the rural district as 9,570 in 2,217 households. The most populous of its 25 villages was Mamakan, with 1,685 people.

=== Other villages in the rural district ===
- Bachehjik
- Kani Rash
- Mastakan
- Qarani
- Seydan
- Yengejeh
