= Kuraneh, Sumay-ye Beradust =

Village in West Azerbaijan province, Iran

Kuraneh Persian: كورانه
- Village
- Location within Iran
- Coordinates: 37°43′27″N 44°41′21″E
- Country: Iran
- Province: West Azerbaijan
- County: Urmia
- District: Sumay-ye Beradust
- Rural District: Beradust

Population (2016)
  - Total: 455
- Time zone: UTC+3:30 (IRST)

Kuraneh (Persian: كورانه) (Note: Also romanized as Kūrāneh) is a village in Beradust Rural District of Sumay-ye Beradust District in Urmia County, West Azerbaijan province, Iran.

== Demographics ==
=== Population ===
At the time of the 2006 National Census, the village's population was 504 in 89 households. The following census in 2011 counted 471 people in 100 households. The 2016 census measured the population of the village as 455 people in 90 households.
