= Nosratabad Rural District (Alborz County) =

Rural district in Qazvin province, Iran

Nosratabad Rural District Persian: دهستان نصرت آباد
- Rural District
- Location within Iran
- Coordinates: 36°07′N 50°04′E
- Country: Iran
- Province: Qazvin
- County: Alborz
- District: Central
- Established: 2005
- Capital: Kamalabad

Population (2016)
  - Total: 5,805
- Time zone: UTC+3:30 (IRST)

Nosratabad Rural District (Persian: دهستان نصرت آباد) is in the Central District of Alborz County, Qazvin province, Iran. Its capital is the village of Kamalabad. The previous capital of the rural district was the village of Nosratabad.

== Demographics ==
=== Population ===
At the time of the 2006 National Census, the rural district's population was 16,093 in 4,077 households. There were 5,919 inhabitants in 1,690 households at the following census of 2011. The 2016 census measured the population of the rural district as 5,805 in 1,814 households. The most populous of its four villages was Kamalabad, with 2,802 people.

=== Other villages in the rural district ===
- Hasanabad-e Kalej
- Kuchar
- Manbareh
