= Mastakan, Sumay-ye Shomali =

Village in West Azerbaijan province, Iran

Mastakan Persian: مستكان
- Village
- Location within Iran
- Coordinates: 37°58′16″N 44°44′41″E
- Country: Iran
- Province: West Azerbaijan
- County: Urmia
- District: Sumay-ye Beradust
- Rural District: Sumay-ye Shomali

Population (2016)
  - Total: 608
- Time zone: UTC+3:30 (IRST)

Mastakan (Persian: مستكان) (Note: Also romanized as Mastakān; in Armenian: Մաստական) is a village in Sumay-ye Shomali Rural District of Sumay-ye Beradust District in Urmia County, West Azerbaijan province, Iran.

== Demographics ==
=== Population ===
At the time of the 2006 National Census, the village's population was 575 in 116 households. The following census in 2011 counted 648 people in 124 households. The 2016 census measured the population of the village as 608 people in 122 households.
