= Hovarsin =

Village in West Azerbaijan province, Iran

Hovarsin Persian: هورسين
- Village
- Location within Iran
- Coordinates: 37°51′41″N 44°36′15″E
- Country: Iran
- Province: West Azerbaijan
- County: Urmia
- District: Sumay-ye Beradust
- Rural District: Sumay-ye Jonubi

Population (2016)
  - Total: 1,328
- Time zone: UTC+3:30 (IRST)

Hovarsin (Persian: هورسين) (Note: Also romanized as Hovarsīn; Armenian: Հովասան) is a village in, and the former capital of, Sumay-ye Jonubi Rural District in Sumay-ye Beradust District of Urmia County, West Azerbaijan province, Iran. The capital of the rural district has been transferred to the village of Hashtian.

== Demographics ==
=== Population ===
At the time of the 2006 National Census, the village's population was 1,147 in 178 households. The following census in 2011 counted 1,204 people in 225 households. The 2016 census measured the population of the village as 1,328 people in 276 households. It was the most populous village in its rural district.
