= Eqbal-e Gharbi Rural District =

Rural district in Qazvin province, Iran

Eqbal-e Gharbi Rural District Persian: دهستان اقبال غربی
- Rural District
- Location within Iran
- Coordinates: 36°21′N 50°00′E
- Country: Iran
- Province: Qazvin
- County: Qazvin
- District: Central
- Established: 1987
- Capital: Nezamabad

Population (2016)
  - Total: 27,796
- Time zone: UTC+3:30 (IRST)

Eqbal-e Gharbi Rural District (Persian: دهستان اقبال غربی) is in the Central District of Qazvin County, Qazvin province, Iran. Its capital is the village of Nezamabad.

== History ==
The original capital of the rural district in 1987 was the village of Naserabad, now a neighborhood in the city of Qazvin. In 1991, the capital was transferred to the village of Mahmudabad-e Nemuneh, now a city. The capital of the rural district passed again in 2000 to the village of Nezamabad.

== Demographics ==
=== Population ===
At the time of the 2006 National Census, the rural district's population was 37,488 in 8,940 households. There were 36,404 inhabitants in 10,172 households at the following census of 2011. The 2016 census measured the population of the rural district as 27,796 in 8,465 households. The most populous of its 68 villages was Nezamabad, with 3,857 people.

=== Other villages in the rural district ===
- Alulak
- Ardabilak
- Charis
- Farsian
- Hadiabad
- Hemmatabad
- Kharman Sukhteh
- Mahmudabad-e Alam Khani
- Mehdiabad-e Bozorg
- Najmabad
- Orosabad
- Qadimabad
- Sheyd Isfahan
- Zuyar
