= Kuchar =

Village in Qazvin province, Iran

Kuchar Persian: كوچار
- Village
- Location within Iran
- Coordinates: 36°07′21″N 50°04′53″E
- Country: Iran
- Province: Qazvin
- County: Alborz
- District: Central
- Rural District: Nosratabad

Population (2016)
  - Total: 384
- Time zone: UTC+3:30 (IRST)

Kuchar (Persian: كوچار) (Note: Also romanized as Kūchār; also known as Kūchār-e Kaltūnābād) is a village in Nosratabad Rural District of the Central District in Alborz County, Qazvin province, Iran.

== Demographics ==
=== Population ===
At the time of the 2006 National Census, the village's population was 552 in 132 households. The following census in 2011 counted 574 people in 146 households. The 2016 census measured the population of the village as 384 people in 124 households.
