= Piranjuq =

Village in West Azerbaijan province, Iran

Piranjuq Persian: پيرانجوق
- Village
- Location within Iran
- Coordinates: 37°54′12″N 44°38′19″E
- Country: Iran
- Province: West Azerbaijan
- County: Urmia
- District: Sumay-ye Beradust
- Rural District: Sumay-ye Jonubi

Population (2016)
  - Total: 514
- Time zone: UTC+3:30 (IRST)

Piranjuq (Persian: پيرانجوق) (Note: Also romanized as Pīrānjūq; also known as Pīr Ānjokh) is a village in Sumay-ye Jonubi Rural District of Sumay-ye Beradust District in Urmia County, West Azerbaijan province, Iran.

== Demographics ==
=== Population ===
At the time of the 2006 National Census, the village's population was 632 in 107 households. The following census in 2011 counted 595 people in 137 households. The 2016 census measured the population of the village as 514 people in 108 households.
