= Quni =

Quni may refer to:

- Quni, Iran or Guni, an Iranian village
- Quni, Hebei or Ch‘ü-ni, a former Chinese town in what is now Shunping County, Hebei
