= Rojan Hazim =

Rojan Hazim (born 1956), is a contemporary Kurdish writer, journalist, translator and literary critic. He was born in Hakkari, southeastern Turkey and founded Xanî & Bateyî publishers in 1989. His articles have appeared in many magazines and newspapers including Nûdem, Huner, Özgür Politika, Ek Politika, Yeni Gündem and Hîwa. He served as the Editor of the Roja Gel, Bingeh and Hêza Welatparêz from 1980 to 1991. He is also literary critic at KURMANCÎ journal published by the Kurdish Institute of Paris. He has translated stories and tales by Hans Christian Andersen and Pushkin into Kurdish.

== Books ==
1. Masîvanê Kal û Masiyê Sor, Translation of The Tale of the Fisherman and the Fish by Pushkin, 31 pp., Xanî & Bateyî Publishers, 1984 .
2. Bilbil, Translation of The Nightingale by Hans Christian Andersen, 47 pp., Hans Reitzels Publishers, København, 1989.
3. Editing of Zimanê çiya, Translation of Mountain Language by Harold Pinter, Xanî & Bateyî Publishers, Brøndby, 1990.
4. Helbestvan û nivîskarekî welatparêz Evdirehîm Rehmîyê Hekarî (Abdurrahim Zapsu) (Abdurrahim Hakkri, the Patriotic Poet and Writer), 130 pp., Xanî & Bateyî Publishers, København, ISBN 8798330748, 1991.
5. Stran: Stranen Kurd & Danmark = Sang: Kurdisk & Dansk Sangbog, (Kurdish and Danish Songs), 115 pp., Xanî & Bateyî Publishers, København, ISBN 8798330713, 1994.
6. 6 Name,93 pp., Xanî & Bateyî Publishers, København, ISBN 8798330780, 1994.
7. Pelatînk, Translation of The Butterfly by Hans Christian Andersen, 85 pp., Xanî & Bateyî Publishers, København, ISBN 8798330756, 1995.
8. Bîranîna Elî Kaşifpûr, 198 pp., Xanî & Bateyî Publishers, Brøndby, ISBN 8798330772, 1997.
9. Zimanê Wêneya, Kurdish-Danish Illustrated Dictionary, 75 pp., Xanî & Bateyî Publishers, København, ISBN 8798806602, 2000.
10. Kürdistan'a Sevgiler (in Turkish), 153 pp., Kurdish Institute of Brussels, 2001.
11. Bîr û Raman, 123 pp., Kurdish Institute of Brussels, 2001.
12. Københavnskriterierne & Krîterên Kopenhagê, 68 pp., Koerden: Speciaalnummer, Kurdish Institute of Brussels, 2002.
13. Paşeroj, 193 pp., Kurdish Institute of Brussels, 2003.
14. Zimanê Kurdi devokê Hekariya (gramer & ferheng) (Hakkari dialect of the Kurdish language: Grammar and Dictionary), 2004.

== Links with list of works ==
1. Bilbil (Nattergalen), The Hans Christian Andersen Center, Denmark.
2. Rojan Hazim, BazArt.dk
3. Digital Library, Kurdish Institute of Paris.
