= Kuraneh, Qazvin =

Village in Qazvin province, Iran

Kuraneh Persian: كورانه
- Village
- Location within Iran
- Coordinates: 36°16′35″N 50°07′27″E
- Country: Iran
- Province: Qazvin
- County: Qazvin
- District: Central
- Rural District: Eqbal-e Sharqi

Population (2016)
  - Total: 1,709
- Time zone: UTC+3:30 (IRST)

Kuraneh (Persian: كورانه) (Note: Also romanized as Kūrāneh) is a village in, and the capital of, Eqbal-e Sharqi Rural District in the Central District of Qazvin County, Qazvin province, Iran.

== Demographics ==
=== Population ===
At the time of the 2006 National Census, the village's population was 1,351 in 360 households. The following census in 2011 counted 1,575 people in 465 households. The 2016 census measured the population of the village as 1,709 people in 507 households.
