= Kukhar =

Kukhar (Ukrainian: Кухар) is a Ukrainian language occupational surname literally meaning "the cook".

The surname may refer to:

- Halyna Kukhar, Ukrainian figure skating coach and former competitive skater
- Roman Kukhar, Ukrainian poet, writer, professor
