= Eqbal-e Sharqi Rural District =

Rural district in Qazvin province, Iran

Eqbal-e Sharqi Rural District Persian: دهستان اقبال شرقی
- Rural District
- Location within Iran
- Coordinates: 36°19′N 50°12′E
- Country: Iran
- Province: Qazvin
- County: Qazvin
- District: Central
- Established: 1987
- Capital: Kuraneh

Population (2016)
  - Total: 10,360
- Time zone: UTC+3:30 (IRST)

Eqbal-e Sharqi Rural District (Persian: دهستان اقبال شرقی) is in the Central District of Qazvin County, Qazvin province, Iran. Its capital is the village of Kuraneh.

== Demographics ==
=== Population ===
At the time of the 2006 National Census, the rural district's population was 13,159 in 3,486 households. There were 14,657 inhabitants in 4,425 households at the following census of 2011. The 2016 census measured the population of the rural district as 10,360 in 3,298 households. The most populous of its 15 villages was Shinqar, with 1,823 people.

=== Other villages in the rural district ===
- Abdolabad
- Aranjak
- Ashnestan
- Dastjerd-e Olya
- Emamzadeh Abazar
- Hamidabad
- Mianbar
- Razjerd
- Reshtqun
