= Mahmudabad-e Nemuneh =

City in Qazvin province, Iran

Mahmudabad-e Nemuneh Persian: محمودآباد نمونه
- City
- Location within Iran
- Coordinates: 36°17′27″N 49°53′59″E
- Country: Iran
- Province: Qazvin
- County: Qazvin
- District: Central
- Established as a city: 1999

Population (2016)
  - Total: 21,982
- Time zone: UTC+3:30 (IRST)

Mahmudabad-e Nemuneh (Persian: محمودآباد نمونه) (Note: Also romanized as Maḩmūdābād Nemūneh; also known as Maḩmūdābād or Makhmudabad; formerly, Maḩmūdābād Sheykh ol Eslāmī and Shārīs) is a city in the Central District of Qazvin County, Qazvin province, Iran.

== History ==
In 1987, Mahmudabad-e Nemuneh was a village in Eqbal-e Gharbi Rural District, whose capital at the time was the village of Naserabad, now a neighborhood in the city of Qazvin. In 1991, the capital was transferred to Mahmudabad-e Nemuneh, which became a city in 1999. The capital of the rural district passed again in 2000 to the village of Nezamabad.

== Demographics ==
=== Ethnicity ===
The vast majority of the people and natives of this city are Azerbaijani Turks‌.

=== Population ===
At the time of the 2006 National Census, the city's population was 19,669 in 4,842 households. The following census in 2011 counted 21,796 people in 5,928 households. The 2016 census measured the population of the city as 21,982 people in 6,461 households.
