= Roman Kukhar =

Roman Mikhailovich Kukhar (aliases Volodymyr R., Roman V Kukhar) Кухар Роман Михайлович (Володимир Р.) (1920–2007) was a Ukrainian poet, writer, He was a professor at Kansas State University. and Fort Hays State University.

== Poetry ==
- Володимир Р. Палкі серця.—Лондон, 1964.—211 с.
- Кухар Р. До блакитних вершин.—Лондон: Об-ня абсольвентів Укр. Академічної гімназії у Львові, ЗСА, 1981.—146 с.
- «Височій, життя!» (1970),
- «Прапори думки» (1970)

== Novels ==
- «Прощавай, минуле!» (1977),
- Кухар Р. В. Манівцями. Повість із сучасного побуту в Америці.—Буенос-Айрес: Вид-во Ю. Середяка, 1989.—247 с.
- «Поцейбіч борсань» (1996),
- «Тиверська провесінь» (1997);
- Володимир Р. Андрій Первозваний. Історична повість.—К.: Україна, 1997.—220 с.
- Володимир Р. Нація на світанку.—Мюнхен: Українське видавництво, 1973.

== Dramaturgy ==
- Володимир Р. Сучасний вертеп: Драматичні твори.—Мюнхен: Українське видавництво, 1973.—171 с.

== Publications ==
- Володимир Р. Простір і воля. Нариси з мандрівок.—Лондон, 1972.—104 с.
- «Записана книга»;

== Scholarly works ==
- «Віденська Січ» (1994),
- «До джерел драматургії Лесі Українки» (2000),
- «Буття в літературі» (2002).
