= Alvand, Iran =

City in Qazvin province, Iran

Alvand Persian: الوند
- City
- Location within Iran
- Coordinates: 36°11′12″N 50°03′50″E
- Country: Iran
- Province: Qazvin
- County: Alborz
- District: Central
- Established as a city: 2012

Population (2016)
  - Total: 93,836
- Time zone: UTC+3:30 (IRST)
- Website: alvand.ir/city

Alvand (Persian: الوند) is a city in the Central District of Alborz County, Qazvin province, Iran, serving as capital of both the county and the district. The village of Alvand was converted to a city under the master plan of the Supreme Council of Urban Planning and Architecture in 2012.

== Demographics ==
=== Population ===
At the time of the 2006 National Census, the city's population was 69,333 in 18,004 households. The following census in 2011 counted 88,711 people in 25,651 households. The 2016 census measured the population of the city as 93,836 people in 28,936 households.
