= Guni, Republic of Dagestan =

Guni Гуни Гуни
- Selo
- Location within Republic of Dagestan Location within Russia
- Coordinates: 43°01′N 46°41′E
- Country: Russia
- Region: Republic of Dagestan
- District: Kazbekovsky District
- Time zone: UTC+3:00

Guni (Russian: Гуни; Avar: Гуни) is a rural locality (a selo) in Kazbekovsky District, Republic of Dagestan, Russia. The population was 3,101 as of 2010. There are 59 streets.

== Nationalities ==
Avars live there.

== Geography ==
Guni is located 7 km southeast of Dylym (the district's administrative centre) by road. Khubar and Gertma are the nearest rural localities.
