= Pir Yusefian Rural District =

Rural district in Qazvin province, Iran

Pir Yusefian Rural District Persian: دهستان پیر یوسفیان
- Rural District
- Location within Iran
- Coordinates: 36°11′N 50°02′E
- Country: Iran
- Province: Qazvin
- County: Alborz
- District: Central
- Established: 1991
- Capital: Pir Yusefian

Population (2016)
  - Total: 4,321
- Time zone: UTC+3:30 (IRST)

Pir Yusefian Rural District (Persian: دهستان پیر یوسفیان) is in the Central District of Alborz County, Qazvin province, Iran. Its capital is the village of Pir Yusefian.

== Demographics ==
=== Population ===
At the time of the 2006 National Census, the rural district's population was 9,427 in 2,237 households. There were 9,988 inhabitants in 2,785 households at the following census of 2011. The 2016 census measured the population of the rural district as 4,321 in 1,274 households. The most populous of its five villages was Pir Yusefian, with 4,071 people.

=== Other villages in the rural district ===
- Shahr-e Sanati-ye Alborz
