= Qarani =

Village in West Azerbaijan province, Iran

Qarani Persian: قرنی
- Village
- Location within Iran
- Coordinates: 38°00′16″N 44°42′13″E
- Country: Iran
- Province: West Azerbaijan
- County: Urmia
- District: Sumay-ye Beradust
- Rural District: Sumay-ye Shomali

Population (2016)
  - Total: 835
- Time zone: UTC+3:30 (IRST)

Qarani (Persian: قرنی) (Note: Formerly known as Quni (قونی), also romanized as Qūnī; also known as Gūnī; in Armenian: Կունի) is a village in Sumay-ye Shomali Rural District of Sumay-ye Beradust District in Urmia County, West Azerbaijan province, Iran.

== Demographics ==
=== Population ===
At the time of the 2006 National Census, the village's population, as Quni, was 898 in 140 households. The following census in 2011 counted 864 people in 177 households, by which time the village was listed as Qarani. The 2016 census measured the population of the village as 835 people in 205 households.
