= Ravand-e Olya, Hamadan =

Ravand-e Olya راوندعليا
- Village
- Location within Iran
- Coordinates: 34°07′45″N 48°21′01″E
- Country: Iran
- Province: Hamadan
- County: Nahavand
- Bakhsh: Central
- Rural District: Shaban

Population (2006)
  - Total: 123
- Time zone: UTC+3:30 (IRST)
  - Summer (DST): UTC+4:30 (IRDT)

Ravand-e Olya (Persian: راوندعليا, also Romanized as Rāvand-e ‘Olyā; also known as Rāvand) is a village in Shaban Rural District, in the Central District of Nahavand County, Hamadan Province, Iran. At the 2006 census, its population was 123, in 27 families.
