= Kuchař =

Kuchař (feminine Kuchařová) is a Czech surname meaning "cook". Notable people with the surname include:

- Ada Kuchařová, Czech orienteer
- Jan Křtitel Kuchař (1751–1829), Czech musician
- Josef Kuchař, Czech footballer
- Taťána Kuchařová, Czech model
- Tomáš Kuchař (born 1976), Czech footballer
