= Sumay-ye Jonubi Rural District =

Rural district in West Azerbaijan province, Iran

Sumay-ye Jonubi Rural District Persian: دهستان صومائ جنوبي
- Rural District
- Location within Iran
- Coordinates: 37°52′N 44°35′E
- Country: Iran
- Province: West Azerbaijan
- County: Urmia
- District: Sumay-ye Beradust
- Established: 1987
- Capital: Hashtian

Population (2016)
  - Total: 12,452
- Time zone: UTC+3:30 (IRST)

Sumay-ye Jonubi Rural District (Persian: دهستان صومائ جنوبي) is in Sumay-ye Beradust District of Urmia County, West Azerbaijan province, Iran. Its capital is the village of Hashtian. The previous capital of the rural district was the village of Hovarsin.

== Demographics ==
=== Population ===
At the time of the 2006 National Census, the rural district's population was 13,915 in 2,258 households. There were 13,075 inhabitants in 2,685 households at the following census of 2011. The 2016 census measured the population of the rural district as 12,452 in 2,649 households. The most populous of its 24 villages was Hovarsin, with 1,328 people.

=== Other villages in the rural district ===
- Bavan
- Jalqaran
- Juhni
- Jujahi
- Kharah Gush
- Kurani
- Piranjuq
- Sufian
