= Central District (Alborz County) =

District in Qazvin province, Iran

Central District (Alborz County) Persian: بخش مرکزی شهرستان البرز
- District
- Location within Iran
- Coordinates: 36°08′N 50°05′E
- Country: Iran
- Province: Qazvin
- County: Alborz
- Established: 2005
- Capital: Alvand

Population (2016)
  - Total: 103,962
- Time zone: UTC+3:30 (IRST)

The Central District of Alborz County (Persian: بخش مرکزی شهرستان البرز) is in Qazvin province, Iran. Its capital is the city of Alvand.

== Demographics ==
=== Population ===
At the time of the 2006 National Census, the district's population was 94,853 in 24,318 households. The following census in 2011 counted 104,618 people in 30,126 households. The 2016 census measured the population of the district as 103,962 inhabitants in 32,024 households.

=== Administrative divisions ===
Central District (Alborz County) Population
Administrative Divisions	2006	2011	2016
Nosratabad RD	16,093	5,919	5,805
Pir Yusefian RD	9,427	9,988	4,321
Alvand (city)	69,333	88,711	93,836
Total	94,853	104,618	103,962
RD = Rural District
