= Beradust Rural District =

Rural district in West Azerbaijan province, Iran

Beradust Rural District Persian: دهستان برادوست
- Rural District
- Location within Iran
- Coordinates: 37°44′N 44°43′E
- Country: Iran
- Province: West Azerbaijan
- County: Urmia
- District: Sumay-ye Beradust
- Established: 1987
- Capital: Ravand-e Sofla

Population (2016)
  - Total: 11,361
- Time zone: UTC+3:30 (IRST)

Beradust Rural District (Persian: دهستان برادوست) is in Sumay-ye Beradust District of Urmia County, West Azerbaijan province, Iran. Its capital is the village of Ravand-e Sofla.

== Demographics ==
=== Ethnicity ===
The rural district is populated by Kurds and Azerbaijani Turks.

=== Population ===
At the time of the 2006 National Census, the rural district's population was 13,766 in 2,378 households. There were 11,593 inhabitants in 2,518 households at the following census of 2011. The 2016 census measured the population of the rural district as 11,361 in 2,496 households. The most populous of its 55 villages was Gangachin, with 2,488 people.

=== Other villages in the rural district ===
- Firuzian
- Gonbad
- Haftsaran
- Kuraneh
- Maluneh
- Neychalan
