= Central District (Qazvin County) =

District in Qazvin province, Iran

Central District (Qazvin County) Persian: بخش مرکزی شهرستان قزوین
- District
- Location within Iran
- Coordinates: 36°18′N 50°04′E
- Country: Iran
- Province: Qazvin
- County: Qazvin
- Capital: Qazvin

Population (2016)
  - Total: 517,952
- Time zone: UTC+3:30 (IRST)

The Central District of Qazvin County (Persian: بخش مرکزی شهرستان قزوین) is in Qazvin province, Iran. Its capital is the city of Qazvin.

== Demographics ==
=== Ethnicity ===
Persians, Azeris and Tats are the largest ethnic groups of the Central District of Qazvin County.

=== Population ===
At the time of the 2006 National Census, the district's population was 469,367 in 125,770 households. The following census in 2011 counted 509,953 people in 150,590 households. The 2016 census measured the population of the district as 517,952 inhabitants in 161,532 households.

=== Administrative divisions ===
Central District (Qazvin County) Population
Administrative Divisions	2006	2011	2016
Eqbal-e Gharbi RD	37,488	36,404	27,796
Eqbal-e Sharqi RD	13,159	14,657	10,360
Eqbaliyeh (city)	49,230	55,498	55,066
Mahmudabad-e Nemuneh (city)	19,669	21,796	21,982
Qazvin (city)	349,821	381,598	402,748
Total	469,367	509,953	517,952
RD = Rural District
