= Sumay-ye Beradust District =

District in West Azerbaijan province, Iran

Sumay-ye Beradust District Persian: بخش صومای برادوست
- District
- Location within Iran
- Coordinates: 37°51′N 44°40′E
- Country: Iran
- Province: West Azerbaijan
- County: Urmia
- Capital: Serow

Population (2016)
  - Total: 35,183
- Time zone: UTC+3:30 (IRST)

Sumay-ye Beradust District (Persian: بخش صومای برادوست) (Note: Armenian: Սոմա և Բրադոստ) is in Urmia County, West Azerbaijan province, Iran. Its capital is the city of Serow.

== Demographics ==
=== Ethnicity and religion ===
The district is populated by Kurds and Azerbaijani Turks. The Kurds speak Kurmanji Kurdish and mainly follow Sunni Islam while the Azerbaijanis speak Azeri Turkish and mainly follow Shia Islam.

=== Population ===
At the time of the 2006 National Census, the district's population was 39,802 in 6,760 households. The following census in 2011 counted 36,216 people in 7,721 households. The 2016 census measured the population of the district as 35,183 inhabitants in 7,831 households.

=== Administrative divisions ===
Sumay-ye Beradust District Population
Administrative Divisions	2006	2011	2016
Beradust RD	13,766	11,593	11,361
Sumay-ye Jonubi RD	13,915	13,075	12,452
Sumay-ye Shomali RD	10,613	10,018	9,570
Serow (city)	1,508	1,530	1,800
Total	39,802	36,216	35,183
RD = Rural District
