= List of cities, towns and villages in Alborz province =

A list of cities, towns and villages in Alborz Province of north-central Iran:

== Alphabetical ==
Cities are in bold text; all others are villages.

=== A ===
Abbasabad-e Bozorg | Abbasabad-e Kuchek | Abdolabad | Abharak | Absar | Adaran | Aghasht | Aghcheh Hesar | Ahmadabad-e Etemad ol Dowleh | Ahmadabad-e Mosaddeq | Ahvarak | Ain Kalaieh | Ajin Dojin | Alaqeband | Alborz Research Centre | Ali Seyyed | Aliabad-e Guneh | Alisar | Amidi Ghamurlu Industrial Centre | Aminabad | Amirnan | Anbar Tappeh | Angeh | Aqdasiyeh | Arababad | Arababad-e Khosravi | Aran | Arangeh | Ardaheh | Ardakan | Armut | Artun | Asara | Asara | Asekan | Asfaran | Asiab Dargah | Askul Darreh | Atashgah | Avanak | Avizar | Ayegan | Azadbar | Azbeki | Aznaq

=== B ===
Baghban Kalachi | Bagh-e Chaveshi | Bagh-e Pir | Bakhtiar | Banu Sahra | Baraghan | Barikan | Beryanchal | Bezaj | Bi Sim-e Kamalabad | Bostan Iran Company

=== C ===
Chaharbagh | Chalengdar | Charan | Chegini | Combat Engineering Centre

=== D ===
Danbalid | Dangizak | Dardeh | Darvan | Dehdar | Dehkadeh-ye Taleqani | Department of Water and Agriculture | Dera Pey | Derakhshaniyeh | Devaslah Friendship Seed Company | Dizan | Do Khanvari | Dowlatabad | Duz Anbar

=== E ===
Ebrahim Beygi | Ebrahimabad | Emam Cheshmeh | Emamzadeh Shahzadeh Hoseyn | Eqbaliyeh | Eshtehard | Esmailabad Shur Qaleh-ye Bala | Esmailabad Shur Qaleh-ye Pain | Esmailabad | Eypak | Eyqer Bolagh

=== F ===
Fardabad | Farrokhabad | Fashand | Fashandak | Fathabad | Firuzabad

=== G ===
Gach Sar | Galinak | Galird | Gar Ab | Garmab | Garmdarreh | Gashnadar | Gasil | Gateh Deh | Gazer Sang | Gol Darreh | Golestanak | Golsar | Guran

=== H ===
Hajji Beyk | Hajjiabad | Haljerd | Hameh Ja | Haranj | Harjab | Hasan Bakul | Hasan Jun | Hasanabad | Hasanabad | Hasanabad-e Majd ol Dolleh | Hasanak Dar | Hashan | Hashtgerd | Hasiran | Hemmatabad | Hiv | Hoseynabad | Hoseynabad-e Kushk Zar

=== J ===
Jafarabad | Jaru | Jazan | Jey | Jovestan | Jozinan | Jurab

=== K ===
Kahrizak | Kajiran | Kalanak | Kalha | Kalinrud | Kalleh-ye Bahram | Kalvan | Kamal Shahr | Karaj | Karaj Nursery | Kargalin | Karimabad | Karkabud | Karkhaneh-e Fakhr-e Iran | Karud | Kash Rud | Kash | Kazemabad | Kelarud | Khachireh | Khasban | Kheyrabad | Khikan | Khorramabad | Khosrowabad | Khur | Khur | Khurvin | Khuzankola | Khvares | Khvodkavand | Khvoran | Khvoranak | Kia Mahalleh | Kiasar | Kiasarlat | Kohneh Deh | Kolaleh Chin | Kondor | Kordan | Kuhsar | Kuin-e Olya | Kulej | Kushkak | Kushk-e Bala | Kushk-e Zar | Kuy-e Behrooz |

=== L ===
Lahran | Laniz | Lashkarabad | Leylestan

=== M ===
Maghrurabad | Mahdasht | Mahmudabad | Malek Faliz | Malekabad-e Hammanlu | Mangolan | Marjan | Masudiyeh | Mazraeh-ye Anjmin | Mazraeh-ye Gazal Darreh | Mazraeh-ye Hamidieh | Mazraeh-ye Inanluyi Ighmorlu | Mazraeh-ye Kazemabad | Mazraeh-ye Mohasses | Mazraeh-ye Mutur Khaneh Shah Bakhti | Mazraeh-ye Nazamabad | Mehdiabad | Mehdiabad | Mehran | Meshkin Dasht | Meydanak | Minavand | Mir | Mirash | Mohammadabad | Mohammadabad-e Afkham ol Dowleh | Mohammadabad-e Afshar | Mohammadshahr | Mohsenabad | Mokhtarabad | Morad Tappeh | Morghak-e Yek | Morghdari-ye Kasht va Sanat Doab | Muchan | Murud

=== N ===
Najmabad | Namak Alan | Narian | Naserabad | Nasht-e Rud | Navizak | Nazarabad | Nazhadubahbudshir Correction Centre | Nekujar | Nesa | Nesa-e Olya | Nesa-ye Sofla | Nosratabad | Noviz-e Olya | Now Kand | Nowjan

=== O ===
Oghlan Tappeh | Owchan | Owrazan

=== P ===
Palangabad | Parachan | Pargeh | Pol-e Khvab | Pordeh Sar | Purkan

=== Q ===
Qaleh-ye Azari | Qaleh-ye Rustai | Qaleh-ye Sheykh | Qanbarabad | Qanli Bolagh | Qarah Qobad | Qarpuzabad | Qasemabad-e Aqa | Qasemabad-e Bozorg | Qasemabad-e Gorji | Qasemabad-e Kuchek | Qebchaq | Qeshlaq-e Daylar | Qeshlaq-e Gong | Qeshlaq-e Mohammadlu | Qezel Hesar | Qezel Hesar | Qowzlu | Quheh

=== R ===
Ramjin | Rey Zamin | Rezaabad | Rezaabad-e Sufian | Rowshanabdar | Rundeh

=== S ===
Safaj Khani | Safar Khvajeh | Sagran | Sagran Chal | Saidabad | Sang Bon | Sanj | Sar Ziarat | Sarak | Sarv Dar | Sefid Aran | Sefidarak | Sehhatabad | Sepiddasht | Seyfabad-e Bozorg | Seyfabad-e Khaleseh | Seyyedabad | Shah-e Badagh | Shahrak-e Afshariyeh | Shahrak-e Elahiyeh | Shahrak-e Mohandesi-ye Zerai | Shahrak-e Sanati-ye Eshtahard | Shahrak-e Taleqani | Shahrasar | Shahr-e Jadid-e Hashtgerd | Shahrestanak | Shalamzar | Shelnak | Shendeh | Sherkat-e Chanieh | Sherkat-e Darafshan | Sherkat-e Yush | Sheykh Hasan | Siah Kalan | Siah Karan | Sibandarreh | Sibestan | Sijan | Sira | Sirud | Soil Fertility Centre | Soltanabad | Soltanabad-e Aran | Sonqorabad | Sorheh | Sorkhab | Sorkheh Darreh | Sowhan

=== T ===
Takyeh-ye Armut | Takyeh-ye Justan | Takyeh-ye Naveh | Taleqan | Talian | Tankaman | Tasisat Sadamirkebir | Tavusiyeh | Tekyeh Aghasht | Tekyeh-e Sepahsalar | Tolombeh Khaneh-ye Shorket Nafat

=== V ===
Vabzar | Valeh | Valian | Vamkuh | Varangeh Rud | Vardeh | Varian | Varkash | Varzan | Vashteh | Vayeh Beyk | Velayat Rud | Veterinary Polyclinic | Vineh |

=== Y ===
Yaqubabad | Yeman Jeluq | Yengi Emam

=== Z ===
Zafaraniyeh | Zakiabad | Zidasht
