= Sagran =

Village in Alborz province, Iran

Sagran Persian: سگران
- Village
- Location within Iran
- Coordinates: 36°12′27″N 50°49′20″E
- Country: Iran
- Province: Alborz
- County: Taleqan
- District: Bala Taleqan
- Rural District: Kenar Rud

Population (2016)
  - Total: 119
- Time zone: UTC+3:30 (IRST)

Sagran (Persian: سگران) (Note: Also romanized as Sagrān; also known as Sakrān) is a village in Kenar Rud Rural District of Bala Taleqan District in Taleqan County, Alborz province, Iran.

== Demographics ==
=== Population ===
At the time of the 2006 National Census, the village's population was 236 in 61 households, when it was in Miyan Taleqan Rural District of the former Taleqan District in Savojbolagh County, Tehran province. In 2008, the district was separated from the county in establishing Taleqan County, and the rural district was transferred to the new Central District. Sagran was transferred to Kenar Rud Rural District created in the new Bala Taleqan District. In 2010, the county was separated from the province in the establishment of Alborz province. The 2016 census measured the population of the village as 119 people in 44 households.
