= Sagran Chal =

Village in Alborz province, Iran

Sagran Chal Persian: سگران چال
- Village
- Location within Iran
- Coordinates: 36°12′03″N 50°49′29″E
- Country: Iran
- Province: Alborz
- County: Taleqan
- District: Bala Taleqan
- Rural District: Kenar Rud

Population (2016)
  - Total: 98
- Time zone: UTC+3:30 (IRST)

Sagran Chal (Persian: سگران چال) (Note: Also romanized as Sagrān Chāl; also known as Sakrān Chāl) is a village in Kenar Rud Rural District of Bala Taleqan District in Taleqan County, Alborz province, Iran.

== Demographics ==
=== Population ===
At the time of the 2006 National Census, the village's population was 94 in 32 households, when it was in Miyan Taleqan Rural District of the former Taleqan District in Savojbolagh County, Tehran province. In 2008, the district was separated from the county in establishing Taleqan County, and the rural district was transferred to the new Central District. Sagran Chal was transferred to Kenar Rud Rural District created in the new Bala Taleqan District. In 2010, the county was separated from the province in the establishment of Alborz province. The 2016 census measured the population of the village as 98 people in 37 households.
