= Seyyedabad, Alborz =

Village in Alborz province, Iran

Seyyedabad Persian: سيداباد
- Village
- Location within Iran
- Coordinates: 36°12′19″N 50°45′26″E
- Country: Iran
- Province: Alborz
- County: Taleqan
- District: Bala Taleqan
- Rural District: Kenar Rud

Population (2006)
  - Total: 949
- Time zone: UTC+3:30 (IRST)

Seyyedabad (Persian: سيداباد) (Note: Also romanized as Seyyedābād) is a village in Kenar Rud Rural District of Bala Taleqan District in Taleqan County, Alborz province, Iran.

== Demographics ==
=== Population ===
At the time of the 2006 National Census, the village's population was 949 in 233 households, when it was in Miyan Taleqan Rural District of the former Taleqan District in Savojbolagh County, Tehran province. In 2008, the district was separated from the county in establishing Taleqan County, and the rural district was transferred to the new Central District. Seyyedabad was transferred to Kenar Rud Rural District created in the new Bala Taleqan District. In 2010, the county was separated from the province in the establishment of Alborz province. The village did not appear in the census of 2016.
