= Haranj =

Village in Alborz province, Iran

Haranj Persian: هرنج
- Village
- Location within Iran
- Coordinates: 36°13′01″N 50°46′00″E
- Country: Iran
- Province: Alborz
- County: Taleqan
- District: Bala Taleqan
- Rural District: Kenar Rud

Population (2016)
  - Total: 356
- Time zone: UTC+3:30 (IRST)

Haranj (Persian: هرنج) is a village in Kenar Rud Rural District of Bala Taleqan District in Taleqan County, Alborz province, Iran.

== Demographics ==
=== Language ===
Like other villages of Taleqan, Tati is the common language in Haranj, but because the majority of the people's businesses and main residences are in Tehran and Karaj, Tati has undergone changes under the influence of the new generation, and the original dialect is only heard by the elderly and a very small number of young people.

=== Population ===
According to the 2006 National Census, the village's population was 498 in 122 households, when it was in Miyan Taleqan Rural District of the former Taleqan District in Savojbolagh County, Tehran province. In 2008, the district was separated from the county in establishing Taleqan County, and the rural district was transferred to the new Central District. Haranj was transferred to Kenar Rud Rural District created in the new Bala Taleqan District. In 2010, the county was separated from the province in the establishment of Alborz province. The 2016 census measured the population of the village as 356 people in 136 households.

Only the Haranjis and those related to Haranji families are allowed to buy land in the village. One of the reasons that Haranj has a pristine and untouched nature is the existence of this law. Due to harsh winters, the population of the village decreases drastically during the season, and reaches its maximum in the summer season.

== Etymology ==
Haranj (هرنج) means the mouth of an aqueduct, and since in the past there was an aqueduct near the village from which the residents supplied their drinking water, it was named Haranj. The local people have another name for the village, Harganj ("Har": Any - "Ganj": Treasure), meaning a place where everywhere has the value of a treasure.

== Economy and products ==
The income of people who live in Haranj is mostly from animal husbandry, or they are engaged in government or freelance work in Taleghan town. But the majority of the population are working in Tehran and Karaj. The main products of Haranj are grain, alfalfa and fruits such as walnuts, cherries, pears, cherries and apples.

== Historical monuments ==
Mansour Castle, related to the 9th-10th century AD, is located in this village. It was registered as one of Iran's national works on 11 September 2002.

The Qiqbad castle of the 4th and 5th centuries AH is also located in the village, another national work.
