= Artun =

Village in Alborz province, Iran

Artun Persian: ارتون
- Village
- Location within Iran
- Coordinates: 36°12′56″N 50°43′28″E
- Country: Iran
- Province: Alborz
- County: Taleqan
- District: Central
- Rural District: Pain Taleqan

Population (2016)
  - Total: 290
- Time zone: UTC+3:30 (IRST)

Artun (Persian: ارتون) (Note: Also romanized as Ārtūn) is a village in Pain Taleqan Rural District of the Central District in Taleqan County, Alborz province, Iran.

== Demographics ==
=== Population ===
At the time of the 2006 National Census, the village's population was 358 in 91 households, when it was in Miyan Taleqan Rural District of the former Taleqan District in Savojbolagh County, Tehran province. In 2008, the district was separated from the county in establishing Taleqan County, and the rural district was transferred to the new Central District. Artun was transferred to Pain Taleqan Rural District in the same district. In 2010, the county was separated from the province in the establishment of Alborz province. The 2016 census measured the population of the village as 290 in 100 households.
