= Karud =

Village in Alborz province, Iran

Karud Persian: كرود
- Village
- Location within Iran
- Coordinates: 36°12′06″N 50°50′02″E
- Country: Iran
- Province: Alborz
- County: Taleqan
- District: Bala Taleqan
- Rural District: Kenar Rud

Population (2016)
  - Total: 94
- Time zone: UTC+3:30 (IRST)

Karud (Persian: كرود) (Note: Also romanized as Karūd) is a village in Kenar Rud Rural District of Bala Taleqan District in Taleqan County, Alborz province, Iran.

== Demographics ==
=== Population ===
At the time of the 2006 National Census, the village's population was 100 in 46 households, when it was in Bala Taleqan Rural District (Note: Renamed Jovestan Rural District) of the former Taleqan District in Savojbolagh County, Tehran province. In 2008, the district was separated from the county in establishing Taleqan County. The rural district was transferred to the new Bala Taleqan District and renamed Jovestan Rural District. Karud was transferred to Kenar Rud Rural District created in the same district. In 2010, the county was separated from the province in the establishment of Alborz province. The 2016 census measured the population of the village as 94 people in 48 households.
