= Geliyard, Alborz =

Village in Alborz province, Iran

Geliyard Persian: گِليَرد
- Village
- Location within Iran
- Coordinates: 36°09′03″N 50°50′45″E
- Country: Iran
- Province: Alborz
- County: Taleqan
- District: Bala Taleqan
- Rural District: Kenar Rud

Population (2016)
  - Total: 172
- Time zone: UTC+3:30 (IRST)

Geliyard (Persian: گِليَرد) (Note: Also romanized as Gelīyard) is a village in Kenar Rud Rural District of Bala Taleqan District in Taleqan County, Alborz province, Iran.

== Etymology ==
The word geliyard or giliyard derives from Gil, the name of an ancient ethnic people in the Medes united confederation, the ancestors of today's Gilaks. The -ard also is the suffix of location, meaning "milieu" or "territory," deriving from the Avestan word ard meaning "land." Hence Geliyard means "the land of the Gil people."

== Demographics ==
=== Population ===
At the time of the 2006 National Census, the village's population was 232 in 42 households, when it was in Bala Taleqan Rural District (Note: Renamed Jovestan Rural District) of the former Taleqan District in Savojbolagh County, Tehran province. In 2008, the district was separated from the county in establishing Taleqan County. The rural district was transferred to the new Bala Taleqan District and renamed Jovestan Rural District. Geliyard was transferred to Kenar Rud Rural District created in the same district. In 2010, the county was separated from the province in the establishment of Alborz province. The 2016 census measured the population of the village as 172 people in 60 households.
