= Pordeh Sar, Alborz =

Village in Alborz province, Iran

Pordeh Sar Persian: پرده سر
- Village
- Location within Iran
- Coordinates: 36°10′29″N 50°46′25″E
- Country: Iran
- Province: Alborz
- County: Taleqan
- District: Bala Taleqan
- Rural District: Kenar Rud

Population (2006)
  - Total: 209
- Time zone: UTC+3:30 (IRST)

Pordeh Sar (Persian: پرده سر) (Note: Also known as Pordsar) is a village in Kenar Rud Rural District of Bala Taleqan District in Taleqan County, Alborz province, Iran.

== Demographics ==
=== Population ===
At the time of the 2006 National Census, the village's population was 209 in 63 households, when it was in Miyan Taleqan Rural District of the former Taleqan District in Savojbolagh County, Tehran province. In 2008, the district was separated from the county in establishing Taleqan County, and the rural district was transferred to the new Central District. Pordeh Sar was transferred to Kenar Rud Rural District created in the new Bala Taleqan District. In 2010, the county was separated from the province in the establishment of Alborz province. The village did not appear in the census of 2016.
