= Kalanak =

Village in Alborz province, Iran

Kalanak Persian: كلانك
- Village
- Location within Iran
- Coordinates: 36°08′56″N 50°39′01″E
- Country: Iran
- Province: Alborz
- County: Taleqan
- District: Central
- Rural District: Miyan Taleqan

Population (2016)
  - Total: 91
- Time zone: UTC+3:30 (IRST)

Kalanak (Persian: كلانك) (Note: Also romanized as Kalānak) is a village in Miyan Taleqan Rural District of the Central District in Taleqan County, Alborz province, Iran.

== Demographics ==
=== Population ===
At the time of the 2006 National Census, the village's population was 113 in 35 households, when it was in Pain Taleqan Rural District of the former Taleqan District in Savojbolagh County, Tehran province. In 2008, the district was separated from the county in establishing Taleqan County, and the rural district was transferred to the new Central District. Fashandak was transferred to Miyan Taleqan Rural District in the same district. In 2010, the county was separated from the province in the establishment of Alborz province. The 2016 census measured the population of the village as 91 people in 32 households.
