= Owrazan =

Village in Alborz province, Iran

Owrazan Persian: اورازان
- Village
- Location within Iran
- Coordinates: 36°07′57″N 50°52′33″E
- Country: Iran
- Province: Alborz
- County: Taleqan
- District: Bala Taleqan
- Rural District: Kenar Rud

Population (2016)
  - Total: 165
- Time zone: UTC+3:30 (IRST)

Owrazan (Persian: اورازان) (Note: Also romanized as Āvrāzān, Owrāzān, and Ūrāzān; also known as Deh-e Avrāzān and Durasān) is a village in Kenar Rud Rural District of Bala Taleqan District in Taleqan County, Alborz province, Iran.

== Demographics ==
=== Population ===
At the time of the 2006 National Census, the village's population was 208 in 76 households, when it was in Bala Taleqan Rural District (Note: Renamed Jovestan Rural District) of the former Taleqan District in Savojbolagh County, Tehran province. In 2008, the district was separated from the county in establishing Taleqan County. The rural district was transferred to the new Bala Taleqan District and renamed Jovestan Rural District. Owrazan was transferred to Kenar Rud Rural District created in the same district. In 2010, the county was separated from the province in the establishment of Alborz province. The 2016 census measured the population of the village as 165 people in 59 households.

== In literature ==
Prominent Iranian novelist Jalal Al-e-Ahmad documented life and culture in Owrazan in his 1954 monograph Owrazan:

Owrazan is one of several thousand Persian villages where ploughing is done in a primitive way, and the villagers often fight over the water supply and are deprived of public baths and sufficient supply of sugar for their tea. The ensuing notes have been taken almost at random during my six visits to the village and stay of not less than 12 months there. They form, therefore, neither a travel book nor a study of dialectology or folklore.
