= Guran, Alborz =

Village in Alborz province, Iran

Guran Persian: گوران
- Village
- Location within Iran
- Coordinates: 36°10′22″N 50°50′42″E
- Country: Iran
- Province: Alborz
- County: Taleqan
- District: Bala Taleqan
- Rural District: Kenar Rud

Population (2016)
  - Total: 401
- Time zone: UTC+3:30 (IRST)

Guran (Persian: گوران) (Note: Also romanized as Gūrān) is a village in, and the capital of, Kenar Rud Rural District in Bala Taleqan District of Taleqan County, Alborz province, Iran.

== Demographics ==
=== Population ===
At the time of the 2006 National Census, the village's population was 553 in 175 households, when it was in Bala Taleqan Rural District (Note: Renamed Jovestan Rural District) of the former Taleqan District in Savojbolagh County, Tehran province. In 2008, the district was separated from the county in establishing Taleqan County. The rural district was transferred to the new Bala Taleqan District and renamed Jovestan Rural District. Guran was transferred to Kenar Rud Rural District created in the same district. In 2010, the county was separated from the province in the establishment of Alborz province. The 2016 census measured the population of the village as 401 people in 155 households.
