= Mir, Iran =

Village in Alborz province, Iran

Mir Persian: مير
- Village
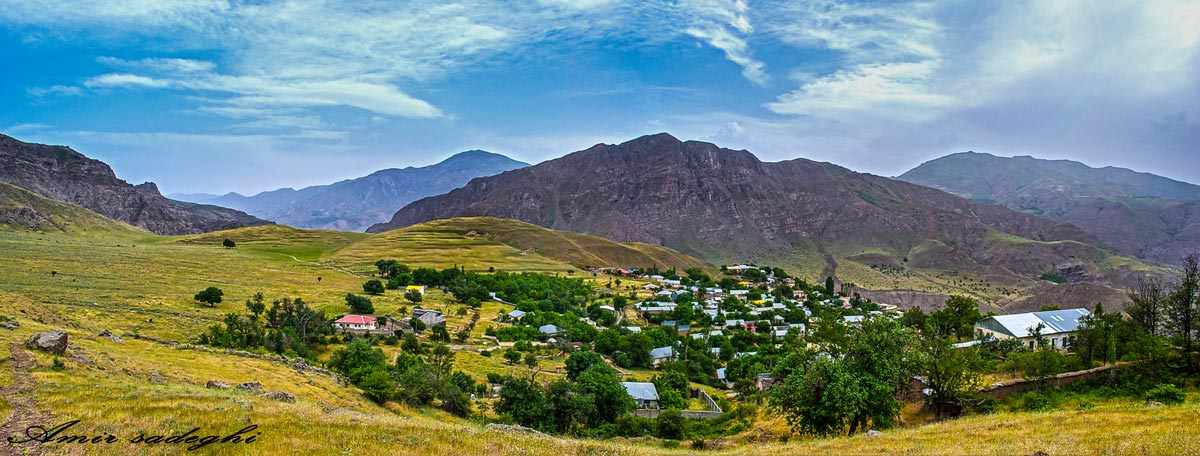
- The village of Mir

- Location within Iran
- Coordinates: 36°15′04″N 50°34′25″E
- Country: Iran
- Province: Alborz
- County: Taleqan
- District: Central
- Rural District: Pain Taleqan

Population (2016)
  - Total: 135
- Time zone: UTC+3:30 (IRST)

Mir (Persian: مير) (Note: Also romanized as Mīr; also known as Kashnab and Rashāb Dar) is a village in Pain Taleqan Rural District of the Central District in Taleqan County, Alborz province, Iran.

== Demographics ==
=== Population ===
At the time of the 2006 National Census, the village's population was 286 in 121 households, when it was in the former Taleqan District of Savojbolagh County, Tehran province. In 2008, the district was separated from the county in establishing Taleqan County, and the rural district was transferred to the new Central District. In 2010, the county was separated from the province in the establishment of Alborz province. The 2016 census measured the population of the village as 135 in 60 households.
