= Avanak, Alborz =

Village in Alborz province, Iran

Avanak Persian: اوانك
- Village
- Location within Iran
- Coordinates: 36°10′56″N 50°48′47″E
- Country: Iran
- Province: Alborz
- County: Taleqan
- District: Bala Taleqan
- Rural District: Kenar Rud

Population (2016)
  - Total: 126
- Time zone: UTC+3:30 (IRST)

Avanak (Persian: اوانك) (Note: Also romanized as Avānak; also known as Vānak) is a village in Kenar Rud Rural District of Bala Taleqan District in Taleqan County, Alborz province, Iran.

== Demographics ==
=== Population ===
At the time of the 2006 National Census, the village's population was 113 in 30 households, when it was in Miyan Taleqan Rural District of the former Taleqan District in Savojbolagh County, Tehran province. In 2008, the district was separated from the county in establishing Taleqan County, and the rural district was transferred to the new Central District. Avanak was transferred to Kenar Rud Rural District created in the new Bala Taleqan District. In 2010, the county was separated from the province in the establishment of Alborz province. The 2016 census measured the population of the village as 126 people in 53 households.
