= Safaj Khani =

Village in Alborz province, Iran

Safaj Khani Persian: سفج خاني
- Village
- Location within Iran
- Coordinates: 36°10′38″N 50°51′04″E
- Country: Iran
- Province: Alborz
- County: Taleqan
- District: Bala Taleqan
- Rural District: Kenar Rud

Population (2016)
  - Total: 145
- Time zone: UTC+3:30 (IRST)

Safaj Khani (Persian: سفج خاني) (Note: Also romanized as Safaj Khānī) is a village in Kenar Rud Rural District of Bala Taleqan District in Taleqan County, Alborz province, Iran.

== Demographics ==
=== Population ===
At the time of the 2006 National Census, the village's population was 113 in 40 households, when it was in Bala Taleqan Rural District (Note: Renamed Jovestan Rural District) of the former Taleqan District in Savojbolagh County, Tehran province. In 2008, the district was separated from the county in establishing Taleqan County. The rural district was transferred to the new Bala Taleqan District and renamed Jovestan Rural District. Safaj Khani was transferred to Kenar Rud Rural District created in the same district. In 2010, the county was separated from the province in the establishment of Alborz province. The 2016 census measured the population of the village as 145 people in 53 households.
