= Minavand =

Village in Alborz province, Iran

Minavand Persian: ميناوند
- Village
- Location within Iran
- Coordinates: 36°08′21″N 50°45′03″E
- Country: Iran
- Province: Alborz
- County: Taleqan
- District: Central
- Rural District: Miyan Taleqan

Population (2016)
  - Total: 186
- Time zone: UTC+3:30 (IRST)

Minavand (Persian: ميناوند) (Note: Also romanized as Mīnāvand) is a village in Miyan Taleqan Rural District of the Central District in Taleqan County, Alborz province, Iran.

== Demographics ==
=== Population ===
At the time of the 2006 National Census, the village's population was 345 in 101 households, when it was in the former Taleqan District of Savojbolagh County, Tehran province. In 2008, the district was separated from the county in establishing Taleqan County, and the rural district was transferred to the new Central District. In 2010, the county was separated from the province in the establishment of Alborz province. The 2016 census measured the population of the village as 186 people in 61 households.
