= Nesa-e Olya =

Village in Alborz, Iran

Nesa-e Olya Persian: نساعليا
- Village
- Location within Iran
- Coordinates: 36°10′38″N 50°52′33″E
- Country: Iran
- Province: Alborz
- County: Taleqan
- District: Bala Taleqan
- Rural District: Jovestan

Population (2016)
  - Total: 326
- Time zone: UTC+3:30 (IRST)

Nesa-e Olya (Persian: نساعليا) (Note: Also romanized as Nesā’-e ‘Olyā; also known as Nesā’ and Nesā’-e Bālā) is a village in Jovestan Rural District (Note: Formerly Bala Taleqan Rural District) of Bala Taleqan District in Taleqan County, Alborz province, Iran.

== Demographics ==
=== Population ===
At the time of the 2006 National Census, the village's population was 356 in 84 households, when it was in Bala Taleqan Rural District (Note: Renamed Jovestan Rural District) of the former Taleqan District in Savojbolagh County, Tehran province. In 2008, the district was separated from the county in establishing Taleqan County. The rural district was transferred to the new Bala Taleqan District and renamed Jovestan Rural District. In 2010, the county was separated from the province in the establishment of Alborz province. The 2016 census measured the population of the village as 326 people in 127 households.
