= Parachan =

Parachan (Persian: پراچان) may refer to:

- Parachan, alternate name of Barajin, Qazvin
- Parachan, Alborz
- Parachan, Qazvin
