= Marjan, Alborz =

Village in Alborz, Iran

Marjan Persian: مرجان
- Village
- Location within Iran
- Coordinates: 36°11′24″N 50°52′08″E
- Country: Iran
- Province: Alborz
- County: Taleqan
- District: Bala Taleqan
- Rural District: Jovestan

Population (2016)
  - Total: 52
- Time zone: UTC+3:30 (IRST)

Marjan (Persian: مرجان) (Note: Also romanized as Marjān) is a village in Jovestan Rural District (Note: Formerly Bala Taleqan Rural District) of Bala Taleqan District in Taleqan County, Alborz province, Iran.

== Demographics ==
=== Population ===
At the time of the 2006 National Census, the village's population was 107 in 24 households, when it was in Bala Taleqan Rural District (Note: Renamed Jovestan Rural District) of the former Taleqan District in Savojbolagh County, Tehran province. In 2008, the district was separated from the county in establishing Taleqan County. The rural district was transferred to the new Bala Taleqan District and renamed Jovestan Rural District. In 2010, the county was separated from the province in the establishment of Alborz province. The 2016 census measured the population of the village as 52 people in 23 households.
