= Khachireh =

Village in Alborz, Iran

Khachireh Persian: خچيره
- Village
- Location within Iran
- Coordinates: 36°08′51″N 50°55′57″E
- Country: Iran
- Province: Alborz
- County: Taleqan
- District: Bala Taleqan
- Rural District: Jovestan

Population (2016)
  - Total: 307
- Time zone: UTC+3:30 (IRST)

Khachireh (Persian: خچيره) (Note: Also romanized as Khachīreh, Khochireh, and Khochīreh; also known as Khūchīreh) is a village in Jovestan Rural District (Note: Formerly Bala Taleqan Rural District) of Bala Taleqan District in Taleqan County, Alborz province, Iran.

== Demographics ==
=== Population ===
At the time of the 2006 National Census, the village's population was 317 in 89 households, when it was in Bala Taleqan Rural District (Note: Renamed Jovestan Rural District) of the former Taleqan District in Savojbolagh County, Tehran province. In 2008, the district was separated from the county in establishing Taleqan County. The rural district was transferred to the new Bala Taleqan District and renamed Jovestan Rural District. In 2010, the county was separated from the province in the establishment of Alborz province. The 2016 census measured the population of the village as 307 people in 112 households.
