= Kulej =

Village in Alborz province, Iran

Kulej Persian: كولج
- Village
- Location within Iran
- Coordinates: 36°11′14″N 50°45′42″E
- Country: Iran
- Province: Alborz
- County: Taleqan
- District: Central
- Rural District: Miyan Taleqan

Population (2006)
  - Total: 440
- Time zone: UTC+3:30 (IRST)

Kulej (Persian: كولج) (Note: Also romanized as Kulaj and Kūlaj) is a village in Miyan Taleqan Rural District of the Central District in Taleqan County, Alborz province, Iran.

== Demographics ==
=== Population ===
At the time of the 2006 National Census, the village's population was 440 in 140 households, when it was in the former Taleqan District of Savojbolagh County, Tehran province. In 2008, the district was separated from the county in establishing Taleqan County, and the rural district was transferred to the new Central District. In 2010, the county was separated from the province in the establishment of Alborz province. Kulej did not appear in the census of 2016.
