= Khvoranak =

Village in Alborz province, Iran

Khvoranak Persian: خورانك
- Village
- Location within Iran
- Coordinates: 36°12′04″N 50°34′15″E
- Country: Iran
- Province: Alborz
- County: Taleqan
- District: Central
- Rural District: Pain Taleqan

Population (2016)
  - Total: 82
- Time zone: UTC+3:30 (IRST)

Khvoranak (Persian: خورانك) (Note: Also romanized as Khūrānak and Khvorānak) is a village in Pain Taleqan Rural District of the Central District in Taleqan County, Alborz province, Iran.

== Demographics ==
=== Population ===
At the time of the 2006 National Census, the village's population was 80 in 29 households, when it was in the former Taleqan District of Savojbolagh County, Tehran province. In 2008, the district was separated from the county in establishing Taleqan County, and the rural district was transferred to the new Central District. In 2010, the county was separated from the province in the establishment of Alborz province. The 2016 census measured the population of the village as 82 in 33 households.
