= Khvoran =

Village in Alborz province, Iran

Khvoran Persian: خوران
- Village
- Location within Iran
- Coordinates: 36°14′26″N 50°30′38″E
- Country: Iran
- Province: Alborz
- County: Taleqan
- District: Central
- Rural District: Pain Taleqan

Population (2016)
  - Total: 69
- Time zone: UTC+3:30 (IRST)

Khvoran (Persian: خوران) (Note: Also romanized as Khvorān; also known as Khūzān) is a village in Pain Taleqan Rural District of the Central District in Taleqan County, Alborz province, Iran.

== Demographics ==
=== Population ===
At the time of the 2006 National Census, the village's population was 311 in 78 households, when it was in the former Taleqan District of Savojbolagh County, Tehran province. In 2008, the district was separated from the county in establishing Taleqan County, and the rural district was transferred to the new Central District. In 2010, the county was separated from the province in the establishment of Alborz province. The 2016 census measured the population of the village as 69 in 22 households.
