= Galinak =

Village in Alborz province, Iran

Galinak Persian: گلينك
- Village
- Location within Iran
- Coordinates: 36°10′16″N 50°45′03″E
- Country: Iran
- Province: Alborz
- County: Taleqan
- District: Central
- Rural District: Miyan Taleqan

Population (2006)
  - Total: 927
- Time zone: UTC+3:30 (IRST)

Galinak (Persian: گلينك) (Note: Also romanized as Galīnak, Gelinak and Gelīnak) is a village in Miyan Taleqan Rural District of the Central District in Taleqan County, Alborz province, Iran.

== Demographics ==
=== Population ===
At the time of the 2006 National Census, the village's population was 927 in 283 households, when it was in the former Taleqan District of Savojbolagh County, Tehran province. In 2008, the district was separated from the county in establishing Taleqan County, and the rural district was transferred to the new Central District. In 2010, the county was separated from the province in the establishment of Alborz province. Galinak did not appear in the census of 2016.
