= Shahrasar =

Village in Alborz province, Iran

Shahrasar Persian: شهراسر
- Village
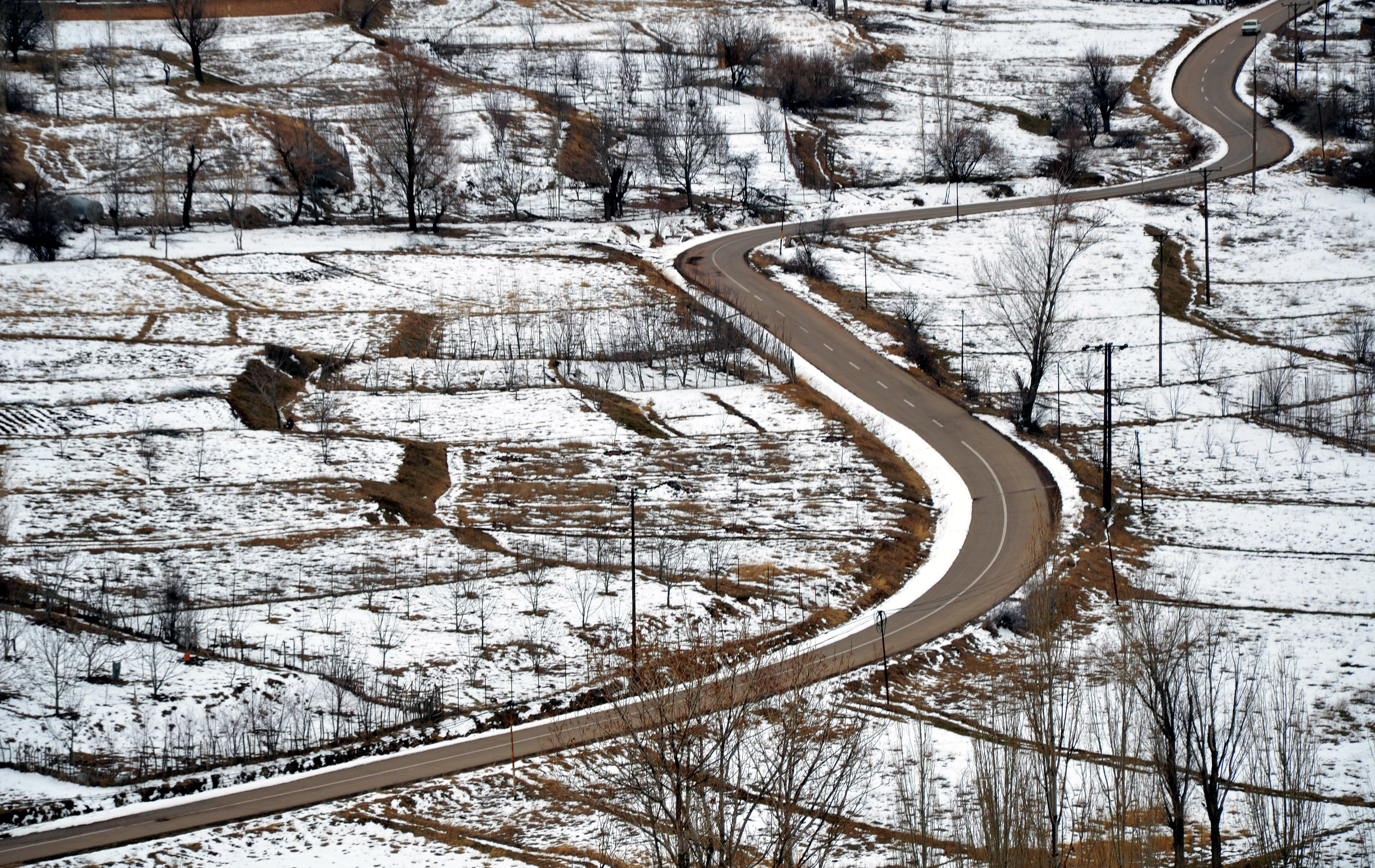
- Alborz, Taleqan, Shahrasar Village

- Location within Iran
- Coordinates: 36°11′54″N 50°37′33″E
- Country: Iran
- Province: Alborz
- County: Taleqan
- District: Central
- Rural District: Pain Taleqan

Population (2016)
  - Total: 98
- Time zone: UTC+3:30 (IRST)

Shahrasar (Persian: شهراسر) (Note: Also romanized as Shahrāsar; also known as Shāhrak) is a village in, and the capital of, Pain Taleqan Rural District in the Central District of Taleqan County, Alborz province, Iran.

== Demographics ==
=== Population ===
At the time of the 2006 National Census, the village's population was 101 in 40 households, when it was in the former Taleqan District of Savojbolagh County, Tehran province. In 2008, the district was separated from the county in establishing Taleqan County, and the rural district was transferred to the new Central District. In 2010, the county was separated from the province in the establishment of Alborz province. The 2016 census measured the population of the village as 98 in 41 households.
