= Karkabud =

Village in Alborz, Iran

Karkabud Persian: كركبود
- Village
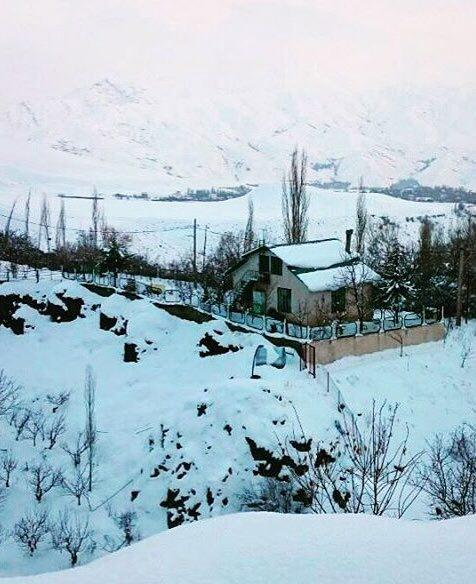
- A house in the village of Karkabud

- Location within Iran
- Coordinates: 36°12′54″N 50°51′13″E
- Country: Iran
- Province: Alborz
- County: Taleqan
- District: Bala Taleqan
- Rural District: Jovestan

Population (2016)
  - Total: 82
- Time zone: UTC+3:30 (IRST)

Karkabud (Persian: كركبود) (Note: Also romanized as Karkabūd) is a village in Jovestan Rural District (Note: Formerly Bala Taleqan Rural District) of Bala Taleqan District in Taleqan County, Alborz province, Iran.

The village is at 2,271 meters above sea level on the slopes of a mountain. Among the trees, there are alleys that connect different parts of the village to each other.

== Demographics ==
=== Population ===
At the time of the 2006 National Census, the village's population was 127 in 39 households, when it was in Bala Taleqan Rural District (Note: Renamed Jovestan Rural District) of the former Taleqan District in Savojbolagh County, Tehran province. In 2008, the district was separated from the county in establishing Taleqan County. The rural district was transferred to the new Bala Taleqan District and renamed Jovestan Rural District. In 2010, the county was separated from the province in the establishment of Alborz province. The 2016 census measured the population of the village as 82 people in 32 households.
