= Ardakan, Alborz =

Village in Alborz province, Iran

Ardakan Persian: اردكان
- Village
- Location within Iran
- Coordinates: 36°11′06″N 50°42′30″E
- Country: Iran
- Province: Alborz
- County: Taleqan
- District: Central
- Rural District: Miyan Taleqan

Population (2016)
  - Total: 57
- Time zone: UTC+3:30 (IRST)

Ardakan (Persian: اردكان) (Note: Also romanized as Ārdakān) is a village in Miyan Taleqan Rural District of the Central District in Taleqan County, Alborz province, Iran.

== Demographics ==
=== Population ===
At the time of the 2006 National Census, the village's population was 251 in 66 households, when it was in the former Taleqan District of Savojbolagh County, Tehran province. In 2008, the district was separated from the county in establishing Taleqan County, and the rural district was transferred to the new Central District. In 2010, the county was separated from the province in the establishment of Alborz province. The 2016 census measured the population of the village as 57 people in 26 households.
