= Gateh =

Gateh (Persian: گته) may refer to:

- Gateh Deh
- Gateh-ye Now
