= Kenar Rud Rural District =

Rural district in Alborz province, Iran

Kenar Rud Rural District Persian: دهستان کنار رود
- Rural District
- Location within Iran
- Coordinates: 36°13′N 50°47′E
- Country: Iran
- Province: Alborz
- County: Taleqan
- District: Bala Taleqan
- Established: 2010
- Capital: Guran

Population (2016)
  - Total: 3,146
- Time zone: UTC+3:30 (IRST)

Kenar Rud Rural District (Persian: دهستان کنار رود) is in Bala Taleqan District of Taleqan County, Alborz province, Iran. Its capital is the village of Guran.

== History ==
In 2008, Taleqan District was separated from Savojbolagh County in establishing Taleqan County, and Kenar Rud Rural District was created in the new Bala Taleqan District. In 2010, the county was separated from Tehran province in the establishment of Alborz province.

== Demographics ==
=== Population ===
At the time of the 2016 National Census, the rural district's population was 3,146 people in 1,183 households. The most populous of its 16 villages was Vashteh, with 593 inhabitants.

=== Other villages in the rural district ===
- Avanak
- Bezaj
- Geliyard
- Haranj
- Hasan Jun
- Hasiran
- Jazan
- Jozinan
- Karud
- Khasban
- Khvodkavand
- Mangolan
- Mohsenabad
- Navizak
- Owrazan
- Pordeh Sar
- Safaj Khani
- Sagran
- Sagran Chal
- Seyyedabad
