= Muchan =

Muchan may refer to:

- Muchan, Alborz, a village in Iran
- Muchan, Chaharmahal and Bakhtiari, a village in Iran
- Muchan, Markazi, a village in Iran
- Kalarippayattu stick fighting
- Muchan, a surname in the West of Scotland e.g. Ryan Muchan
