= Sang Bon, Alborz =

Village in Alborz province, Iran

Sang Bon Persian: سنگبن
- Village
- Location within Iran
- Coordinates: 36°09′48″N 50°38′33″E
- Country: Iran
- Province: Alborz
- County: Taleqan
- District: Central
- Rural District: Pain Taleqan
- Elevation: 1,910 m (6,270 ft)

Population (2016)
  - Total: 442
- Time zone: UTC+3:30 (IRST)

Sang Bon (Persian: سنگبن) is a village in Pain Taleqan Rural District of the Central District in Taleqan County, Alborz province, Iran.

== Demographics ==
=== Population ===
At the time of the 2006 National Census, the village's population was 421 in 92 households, when it was in the former Taleqan District of Savojbolagh County, Tehran province. In 2008, the district was separated from the county in establishing Taleqan County, and the rural district was transferred to the new Central District. In 2010, the county was separated from the province in the establishment of Alborz province. The 2016 census measured the population of the village as 442 in 199 households. It was the most populous village in its rural district.
