= Jovestan =

Village in Alborz, Iran

Jovestan Persian: جوستان
- Village
- Location within Iran
- Coordinates: 36°11′12″N 50°53′13″E
- Country: Iran
- Province: Alborz
- County: Taleqan
- District: Bala Taleqan
- Rural District: Jovestan

Population (2016)
  - Total: 358
- Time zone: UTC+3:30 (IRST)

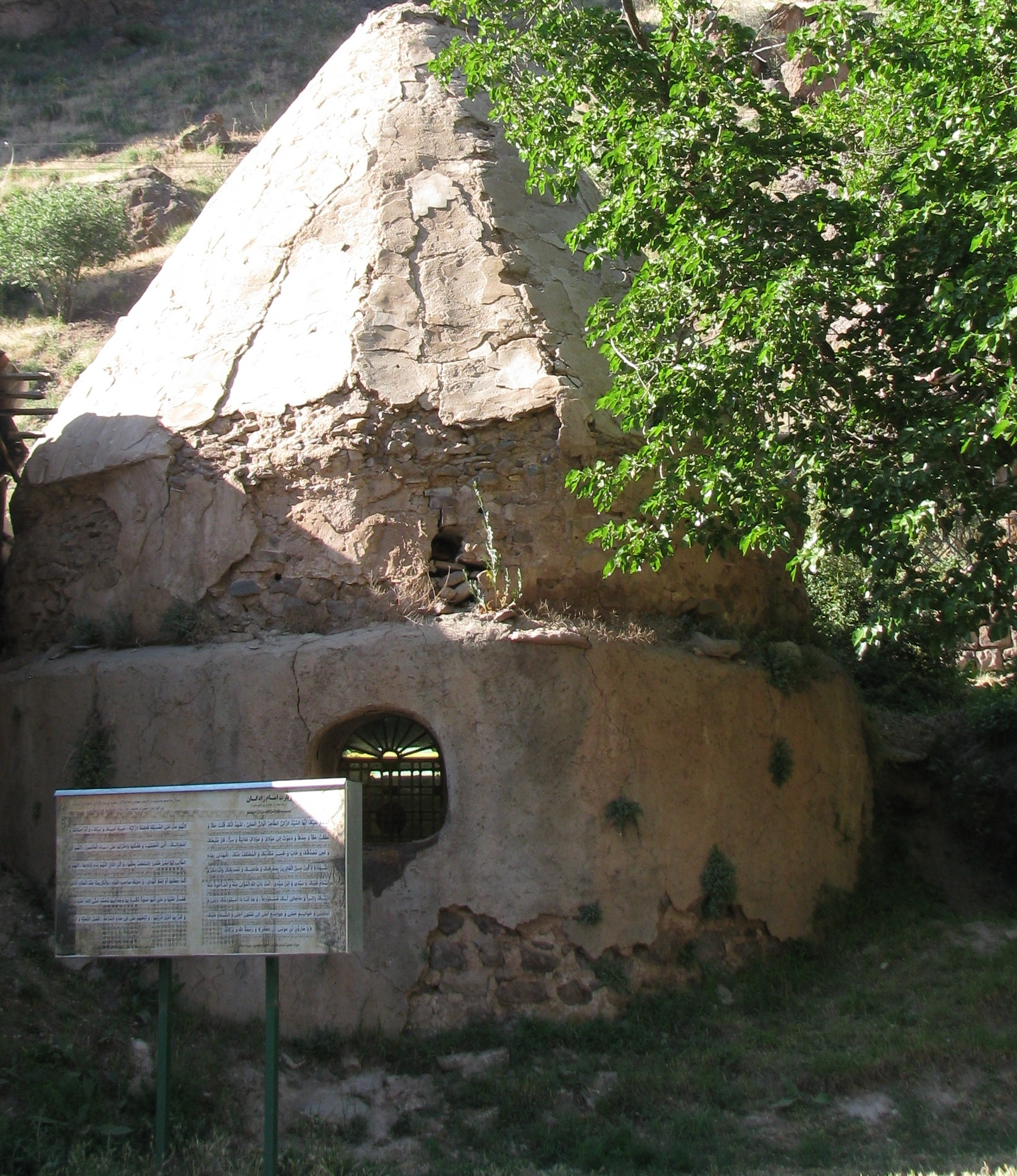
Tomb of Imamzadeh Haroun, located in the village

Jovestan (Persian: جوستان) (Note: Also romanized as Jovestān, Jowestān, and Jowstān; also known as Joīstān) is a village in Jovestan Rural District (Note: Formerly Bala Taleqan Rural District) of Bala Taleqan District in Taleqan County, Alborz province, Iran, serving as capital of both the district and the rural district.

== Demographics ==
=== Population ===
At the time of the 2006 National Census, the village's population was 421 in 125 households, when it was in Bala Taleqan Rural District (Note: Renamed Jovestan Rural District) of the former Taleqan District in Savojbolagh County, Tehran province. In 2008, the district was separated from the county in establishing Taleqan County. The rural district was transferred to the new Bala Taleqan District and renamed Jovestan Rural District. In 2010, the county was separated from the province in the establishment of Alborz province. The 2016 census measured the population of the village as 358 people in 144 households.
