= Avanak =

Avanak (Persian: اوانك) may refer to:

- Avanak, Alborz
- Avanak, Qazvin
