= Sowhan, Alborz =

Village in Alborz province, Iran

Sowhan Persian: سوهان
- Village
- Location within Iran
- Coordinates: 36°13′13″N 50°38′59″E
- Country: Iran
- Province: Alborz
- County: Taleqan
- District: Central
- Rural District: Pain Taleqan

Population (2016)
  - Total: 355
- Time zone: UTC+3:30 (IRST)

Sowhan (Persian: سوهان) (Note: Also romanized as Sowhān and Sūhān) is a village in Pain Taleqan Rural District of the Central District in Taleqan County, Alborz province, Iran.

== Demographics ==
=== Population ===
At the time of the 2006 National Census, the village's population was 775 in 212 households, when it was in the former Taleqan District of Savojbolagh County, Tehran province. In 2008, the district was separated from the county in establishing Taleqan County, and the rural district was transferred to the new Central District. In 2010, the county was separated from the province in the establishment of Alborz province. The 2016 census measured the population of the village as 355 in 147 households.
