= HIV (disambiguation) =

HIV, or human immunodeficiency virus, is a retrovirus that causes AIDS.

HIV or hiv may also refer to:

- .hiv, a generic top-level domain
- Hiv Rural District, in Alborz Province of Iran
  - Hiv, Iran, a village in the district
- H.IV+ (Hoarse Industrial Viremia), a 2009 album by Havoc Unit
- H.I.V (album), a 2012 album by Jovi

== See also ==
- Hive
