= Sang Bon =

Sang Bon (Persian: سنگ بن) may refer to:

- Sang Bon, Alborz
- Sang Bon, Mazandaran
