= Pordeh Sar =

Pordeh Sar or Pordsar (Persian: پرده سر) may refer to:

- Pordeh Sar, Alborz
- Pordeh Sar, Mazandaran
