= Falis Castle =

Castle in Alborz Province, Iran

Falis castle
- قلعه فالیس

General information
- Type: Castle
- Location: Taleqan County, Iran

Falis castle (Persian: قلعه فالیس) is a historical castle located in Taleqan County in Alborz Province, The longevity of this fortress dates back to the Historical periods after Islam.
