= Gabaran Castle =

Castle in Alborz Province, Iran

Gabaran castle
- قلعه گبران
- Interactive map of the Gabaran castle area

General information
- Type: Castle
- Location: Savojbolagh County, Iran
- Coordinates: 36.0272°N 50.6425°E

Gabaran castle (Persian: قلعه گبران) is a historical castle located in Savojbolagh County in Alborz province, The longevity of this fortress dates back to the Historical periods after Islam.
