= Karkabud Waterfall =

Limestone waterfall

Coordinates: 36°13′06″N 50°51′20″E

Karkabud Waterfall (Persian: آبشار كركبود, also in local usage Gor) is a limestone waterfall in Karkabud, Taleqan region, Alborz Province, Iran. It is located in a rocky and mountainous valley. The waterfall's river originate in the highlands of Hesarchal, Mazandaran.

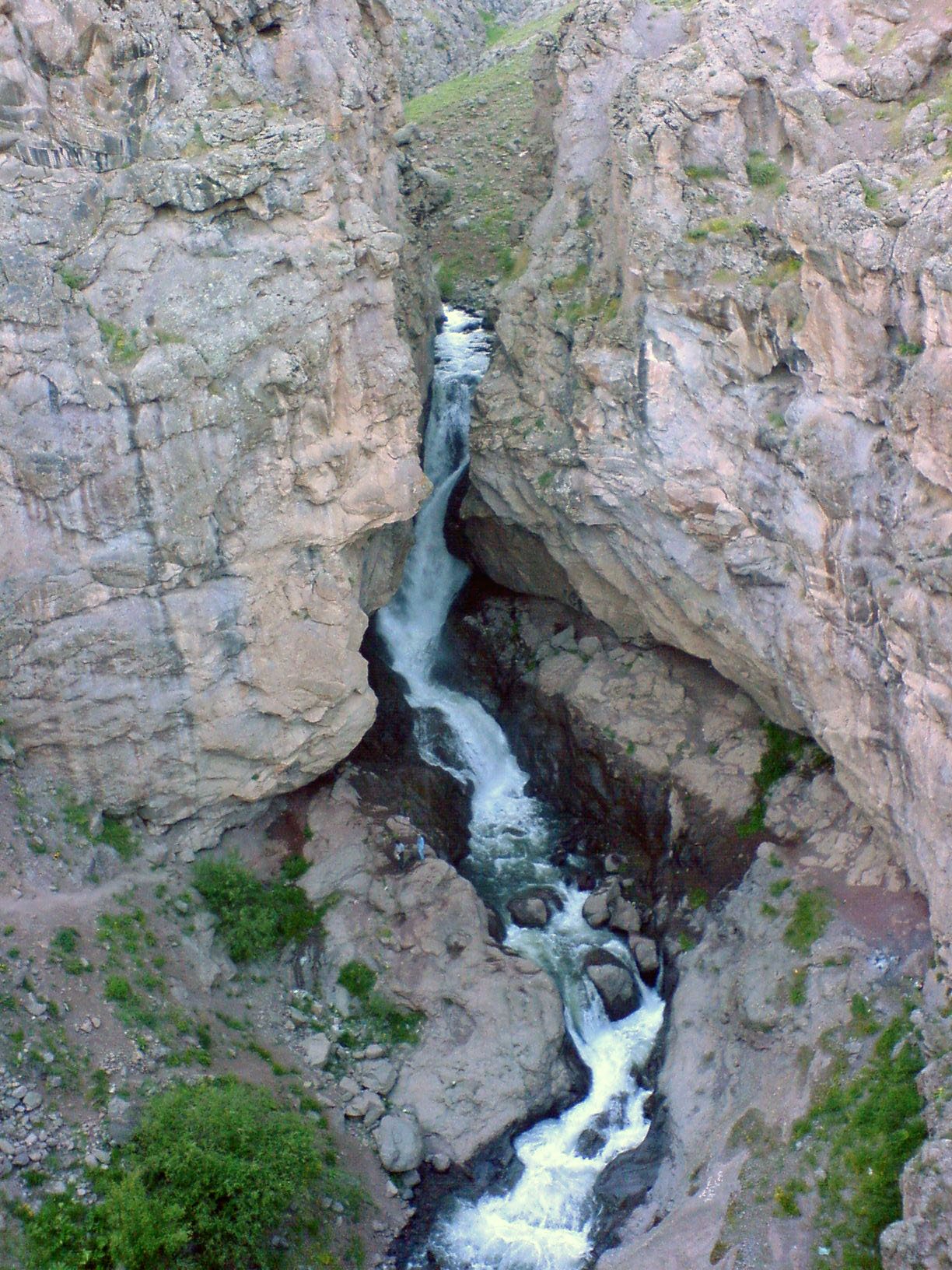
Karkabud Waterfall (Gor)

== Artistic aspects ==
Although the waterfall is not especially tall, the volume of water through its outfalls is significant.
