= Ardakan (disambiguation) =

Ardakan is a city in Yazd Province, Iran.

Ardakan (Persian: اردكان) may also refer to:

- Ardakan, Alborz
- Ardakan, Fars
- Ardakan County, in Yazd Province
