= Voshteh =

Voshteh or Veshteh or Vashteh (Persian: وشته) may refer to:

- Vashteh, Alborz
- Voshteh, Qazvin
