= Asekan =

Asekan or Askan or Eskan (Persian: اسكان) may refer to:

- Asekan, Alborz
- Eskan, Hamadan
- Eskan, Markazi
- Asekan, Sistan and Baluchestan
