= Sowhan =

Sowhan or Suhan may refer to:

- Sohan (cake)
- Sowhan, Alborz, a village in Alborz Province, Iran
- Sowhan, Razavi Khorasan, a village in Razavi Khorasan Province, Iran
