= Uchan =

Uchan may refer to:

- Owchan, a village in Iran
- Uchen script
