= Morghak-e Yek =

Morghak-e Yek مرغك یک
- Village
- Country: Iran
- Province: Alborz
- County: Savojbolagh
- Bakhsh: Chaharbagh
- Rural District: Ramjin

Population (2006)
  - Total: 70
- Time zone: UTC+3:30 (IRST)

Morghak-e Yek (Persian: مرغك یک, also Romanized as Morghaḵ-e Yek) is a village in Ramjin Rural District, Chaharbagh District, Savojbolagh County, Alborz Province, Iran. At the 2006 census, its population was 70, in 25 families.
