= Shalamzar, Alborz =

Village in Alborz province, Iran

Shalamzar Persian: شلمزار
- Village
- Location within Iran
- Coordinates: 36°02′49″N 50°39′26″E
- Country: Iran
- Province: Alborz
- County: Savojbolagh
- District: Central
- Rural District: Hiv

Population (2016)
  - Total: 1,367
- Time zone: UTC+3:30 (IRST)

Shalamzar (Persian: شلمزار) (Note: Also romanized as Shalamzār and Shelamzār) is a village in Hiv Rural District of the Central District in Savojbolagh County, Alborz province, Iran.

== Demographics ==
=== Population ===
At the time of the 2006 National Census, the village's population was 1,336 in 382 households, when it was in Tehran province. The 2016 census measured the population of the village as 1,367 in 452 households, by which time the county had been separated from the province in the establishment of Alborz province.
