= Sefidarak =

Village in Alborz province, Iran

Sefidarak Persian: سفيدارک
- Village
- Location within Iran
- Coordinates: 36°03′06″N 50°43′44″E
- Country: Iran
- Province: Alborz
- County: Savojbolagh
- District: Central
- Rural District: Hiv

Population (2016)
  - Total: 195
- Time zone: UTC+3:30 (IRST)

Sefidarak (Persian: سفيدارک) (Note: Also romanized as Sefīdārak; also known as Sepidarak (سپيدارک), also romanized as Sepīdārak and Sepīddārak) is a village in Hiv Rural District of the Central District in Savojbolagh County, Alborz province, Iran.

== Demographics ==
=== Population ===
At the time of the 2006 National Census, the village's population was 26 in 10 households, when it was in Tehran province. The 2016 census measured the population of the village as 195 in 63 households, by which time the county had been separated from the province in the establishment of Alborz province.
