= Arababad, Alborz =

Village in Alborz province, Iran

Arababad Persian: عرب اباد
- Village
- Location within Iran
- Coordinates: 36°00′39″N 50°40′36″E
- Country: Iran
- Province: Alborz
- County: Savojbolagh
- District: Central
- Rural District: Hiv

Population (2016)
  - Total: 496
- Time zone: UTC+3:30 (IRST)

Arababad (Persian: عرب اباد) (Note: Also romanized as ‘Arabābād; also known as ‘Arabābād-e Afshār) is a village in Hiv Rural District of the Central District in Savojbolagh County, Alborz province, Iran.

== Demographics ==
=== Population ===
At the time of the 2006 National Census, the village's population was 516 in 147 households, when it was in Tehran province. The 2016 census measured the population of the village as 496 in 156 households, by which time the county had been separated from the province in the establishment of Alborz province.
