= Khur, Savojbolagh =

Village in Alborz province, Iran

Khur Persian: خور
- Village
- Location within Iran
- Coordinates: 36°00′53″N 50°42′21″E
- Country: Iran
- Province: Alborz
- County: Savojbolagh
- District: Central
- Rural District: Hiv

Population (2016)
  - Total: 4,409
- Time zone: UTC+3:30 (IRST)

Khur (Persian: خور) (Note: Also romanized as Khūr) is a village in Hiv Rural District of the Central District in Savojbolagh County, Alborz province, Iran.

== Demographics ==
=== Population ===
At the time of the 2006 National Census, the village's population was 4,413 in 1,206 households, when it was in Tehran province. The 2016 census measured the population of the village as 4,409 in 1,418 households, by which time the county had been separated from the province in the establishment of Alborz province.
