= Muchan, Chaharmahal and Bakhtiari =

Muchan موچان
- Village
- Location within Iran
- Coordinates: 32°17′15″N 49°59′19″E
- Country: Iran
- Province: Chaharmahal and Bakhtiari
- County: Kuhrang
- Bakhsh: Bazoft
- Rural District: Bazoft

Population (2006)
  - Total: 28
- Time zone: UTC+3:30 (IRST)
  - Summer (DST): UTC+4:30 (IRDT)

Muchan (Persian: موچان, also Romanized as Mūchān) is a village in Bazoft Rural District, Bazoft District, Kuhrang County, Chaharmahal and Bakhtiari Province, Iran. At the 2006 census, its population was 28, in 5 families. The village is populated by Lurs.
