= Hiv Rural District =

Rural district in Alborz province, Iran

Hiv Rural District Persian: دهستان هيو
- Rural District
- Location within Iran
- Coordinates: 36°03′N 50°39′E
- Country: Iran
- Province: Alborz
- County: Savojbolagh
- District: Central
- Established: 1987
- Capital: Hiv

Population (2016)
  - Total: 15,164
- Time zone: UTC+3:30 (IRST)

Hiv Rural District (Persian: دهستان هيو) is in the Central District of Savojbolagh County, Alborz province, Iran. Its capital is the village of Hiv.

== Demographics ==
=== Population ===
At the time of the 2006 National Census, the rural district's population (as a part of Tehran province) was 14,352 in 3,992 households. The 2016 census measured the population of the rural district as 15,164 in 4,927 households, by which time the county had been separated from the province in the establishment of Alborz province. The most populous of its eight villages was Hiv, with 8,697 people.

=== Other villages in the rural district ===
- Arababad
- Khur
- Sefidarak
- Shalamzar
