= Barajin =

Barajin باراجين
- Village
- Location within Iran
- Coordinates: 36°21′19″N 50°04′00″E
- Country: Iran
- Province: Qazvin
- County: Qazvin
- Bakhsh: Central
- Rural District: Eqbal-e Gharbi

Population (2006)
  - Total: 98
- Time zone: UTC+3:30 (IRST)
  - Summer (DST): UTC+4:30 (IRDT)

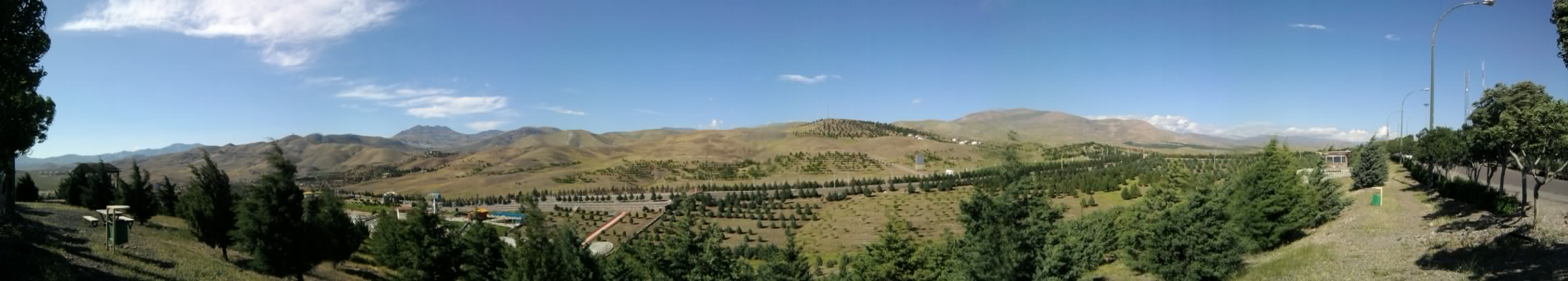
Wide-angle photo of a park in Barajin

Barajin (Persian: باراجين, also Romanized as Bārājīn, Bārāchīn, Barajān; also known as Parāchān) is a village in Eqbal-e Gharbi Rural District, in the Central District of Qazvin County, Qazvin Province, Iran. At the 2006 census, its population was 98, in 25 families.
