= Hiv, Iran =

Village in Alborz province, Iran

Hiv Persian: هيو
- Village
- Location within Iran
- Coordinates: 36°01′26″N 50°38′39″E
- Country: Iran
- Province: Alborz
- County: Savojbolagh
- District: Central
- Rural District: Hiv

Population (2016)
  - Total: 8,697
- Time zone: UTC+3:30 (IRST)

Hiv (Persian: هيو) (Note: Also romanized as Heev and Hīv) is a village in, and the capital of, Hiv Rural District in the Central District of Savojbolagh County, Alborz province, Iran.

== Demographics ==
=== Population ===
At the time of the 2006 National Census, the village's population was 8,061 in 2,247 households, when it was in Tehran province. The 2016 census measured the population of the village as 8,697 in 2,838 households, by which time the county had been separated from the province in the establishment of Alborz province. It was the most populous village in its rural district.
