= Taleqan =

City in Alborz province, Iran

Taleqan Persian: طالقان
- City

- Location within Iran
- Coordinates: 36°10′33″N 50°45′50″E
- Country: Iran
- Province: Alborz
- County: Taleqan
- District: Central
- Established as a city: 1994

Population (2016)
  - Total: 3,545
- Time zone: UTC+3:30 (IRST)

Taleqan (Persian: طالقان) (Note: Also romanized as Ṭâleqân; formerly the village of Shahrak) is a city in the Central District of Taleqan County, Alborz province, Iran, serving as capital of both the county and the district. It is also the administrative center for Miyan Taleqan Rural District. Taleqan is in the Alborz mountain range.

== Demographics ==
=== Population ===
At the time of the 2006 National Census, the city's population was 3,281 in 988 households, when it was capital of the former Taleqan District in Savojbolagh County, Tehran province. In 2008, the district was separated from the county in establishing Taleqan County, and Taleqan was transferred to the new Central District as the county's capital. In 2010, the county was separated from the province in the establishment of Alborz province. The 2016 census measured the population of the city as 3,545 in 1,241 households.

== See also ==
Taleghan travel guide from Wikivoyage
