= Pain Taleqan Rural District =

Rural district in Alborz province Iran

Pain Taleqan Rural District Persian: دهستان پائين طالقان
- Rural District
- Location within Iran
- Coordinates: 36°14′N 50°35′E
- Country: Iran
- Province: Alborz
- County: Taleqan
- District: Central
- Established: 1987
- Capital: Shahrasar

Population (2016)
  - Total: 3,660
- Time zone: UTC+3:30 (IRST)

Pain Taleqan Rural District (Persian: دهستان پائين طالقان) is in the Central District of Taleqan County, Alborz province, Iran. Its capital is the village of Shahrasar.

== Demographics ==
=== Population ===
At the time of the 2006 National Census, the rural district's population (as a part of the former Taleqan District in Savojbolagh County, Tehran province) was 6,018 in 1,875 households. In 2008, the district was separated from the county in establishing Taleqan County, and the rural district was transferred to the new Central District. In 2010, the county was separated from the province in the establishment of Alborz province. The 2016 census measured the population of the rural district as 3,660 in 1,449 households. The most populous of its 30 villages was Sang Bon, with 442 people.

=== Other villages in the rural district ===
- Ahvarak
- Alisar
- Amirnan
- Angeh
- Armut
- Artun
- Asfaran
- Danbalid
- Kajiran
- Kash
- Kash Rud
- Kelarud
- Khvoran
- Khvoranak
- Lahran
- Mir
- Muchan
- Nesa-ye Sofla
- Owchan
- Pargeh
- Rowshanabdar
- Sowhan
- Takyeh-ye Armut
- Takyeh-ye Naveh
