= Jovestan Rural District =

Rural district in Alborz province, Iran

Jovestan Rural District Persian: دهستان جوستان
- Rural District
- Location within Iran
- Coordinates: 36°13′N 51°02′E
- Country: Iran
- Province: Alborz
- County: Taleqan
- District: Bala Taleqan
- Established: 1987
- Capital: Jovestan

Population (2016)
  - Total: 4,193
- Time zone: UTC+3:30 (IRST)

Jovestan Rural District (Persian: دهستان جوستان) (Note: Formerly Bala Taleqan Rural District (دهستان بالا طالقان)) is in Bala Taleqan District of Taleqan County, Alborz province, Iran. Its capital is the village of Jovestan.

== Demographics ==
=== Population ===
At the time of the 2006 National Census, the rural district's population (as Bala Taleqan Rural District of the former Taleqan District in Savojbolagh County, Tehran province) was 6,609 in 1,932 households. In 2008, the district was separated from the county in establishing Taleqan County, and the rural district was transferred to the new Bala Taleqan District. In 2010, the county was separated from the province in the establishment of Alborz province. The 2016 census measured the population of the rural district as 4,193 people in 1,622 households. The most populous of its 26 villages was Dizan, with 665 inhabitants.

=== Other villages in the rural district ===
- Absar
- Ain Kalaieh
- Asekan
- Dehdar
- Dera Pey
- Gar Ab
- Gateh Deh
- Hashan
- Karkabud
- Khachireh
- Khikan
- Kia Mahalleh
- Kuin-e Olya
- Marjan
- Mehran
- Narian
- Nesa-e Olya
- Noviz-e Olya
- Parachan
- Takyeh-ye Jovestan
