= Miyan Taleqan Rural District =

Rural district in Alborz province, Iran

Miyan Taleqan Rural District Persian: دهستان ميان طالقان
- Rural District
- Location within Iran
- Coordinates: 36°09′N 50°43′E
- Country: Iran
- Province: Alborz
- County: Taleqan
- District: Central
- Established: 1987
- Capital: Taleqan

Population (2016)
  - Total: 2,271
- Time zone: UTC+3:30 (IRST)

Miyan Taleqan Rural District (Persian: دهستان ميان طالقان) is in the Central District of Taleqan County, Alborz province, Iran. Administered from the city of Taleqan, (Note: Formerly the village of Shahrak) it is in the Alborz (Elburz) mountain range.

== Demographics ==
=== Population ===
At the time of the 2006 National Census, the rural district's population (as a part of the former Taleqan District in Savojbolagh County, Tehran province) was 9,873 in 2,779 households. In 2008, the district was separated from the county in establishing Taleqan County, and the rural district was transferred to the new Central District. In 2010, the county was separated from the province in the establishment of Alborz province. The 2016 census measured the population of the rural district as 2,271 in 859 households. The most populous of its 24 villages was Zidasht, with 816 people.

=== Other villages in the rural district ===
- Ardakan
- Barikan
- Fashandak
- Galinak
- Kalanak
- Kulej
- Minavand
- Mirash
- Varkash
