= Bala Taleqan District =

District in Alborz province, Iran

Bala Taleqan District Persian: بخش بالا طالقان
- District
- Location within Iran
- Coordinates: 36°13′N 50°57′E
- Country: Iran
- Province: Alborz
- County: Taleqan
- Established: 2008
- Capital: Jovestan

Population (2016)
  - Total: 7,339
- Time zone: UTC+3:30 (IRST)

Bala Taleqan District (Persian: بخش بالا طالقان) is in Taleqan County, Alborz province, Iran. Its capital is the village of Jovestan.

== History ==
In 2008, Taleqan District was separated from Savojbolagh County in establishing Taleqan County, which was divided into two districts of two rural districts each, with Taleqan (Note: Formerly the village of Shahrak) as its capital and only city at the time. In 2010, the county was separated from Tehran province in the establishment of Alborz province.

== Demographics ==
=== Population ===
At the time of the 2016 National Census, the district's population was 7,339 in 2,805 households.

=== Administrative divisions ===
Bala Taleqan District Population
| Administrative Divisions | 2016 |
|---|---|
| Jovestan RD (Note: Formerly Bala Taleqan Rural District) | 4,193 |
| Kenar Rud RD | 3,146 |
| Total | 7,339 |
RD = Rural District
