= Central District (Taleqan County) =

District in Alborz province, Iran

Central District (Taleqan County) Persian: بخش مرکزی شهرستان طالقان
- District
- Location within Iran
- Coordinates: 36°13′N 50°37′E
- Country: Iran
- Province: Alborz
- County: Taleqan
- Established: 2008

Population (2016)
  - Total: 9,476
- Time zone: UTC+3:30 (IRST)

The Central District of Taleqan County (Persian: بخش مرکزی شهرستان طالقان) is in Taleqan County, Alborz province, Iran. Its capital is the city of Taleqan. (Note: Formerly the village of Shahrak)

== History ==
In 2008, Taleqan District was separated from Savojbolagh County in establishing Taleqan County, which was divided into two districts of two rural districts each, with Taleqan as its capital and only city at the time. In 2010, the county was separated from Tehran province in the establishment of Alborz province.

== Demographics ==
=== Population ===
At the time of the 2016 National Census, the district's population was 9,476 in 3,549 households.

=== Administrative divisions ===
Central District Population
Administrative Divisions	2016
Miyan Taleqan RD	2,271
Pain Taleqan RD	3,660
Taleqan (city)	3,545
Total	9,476
RD = Rural District
