= Taleqan County =

County in Alborz province, Iran

Taleqan County Persian: شهرستان طالقان
- County
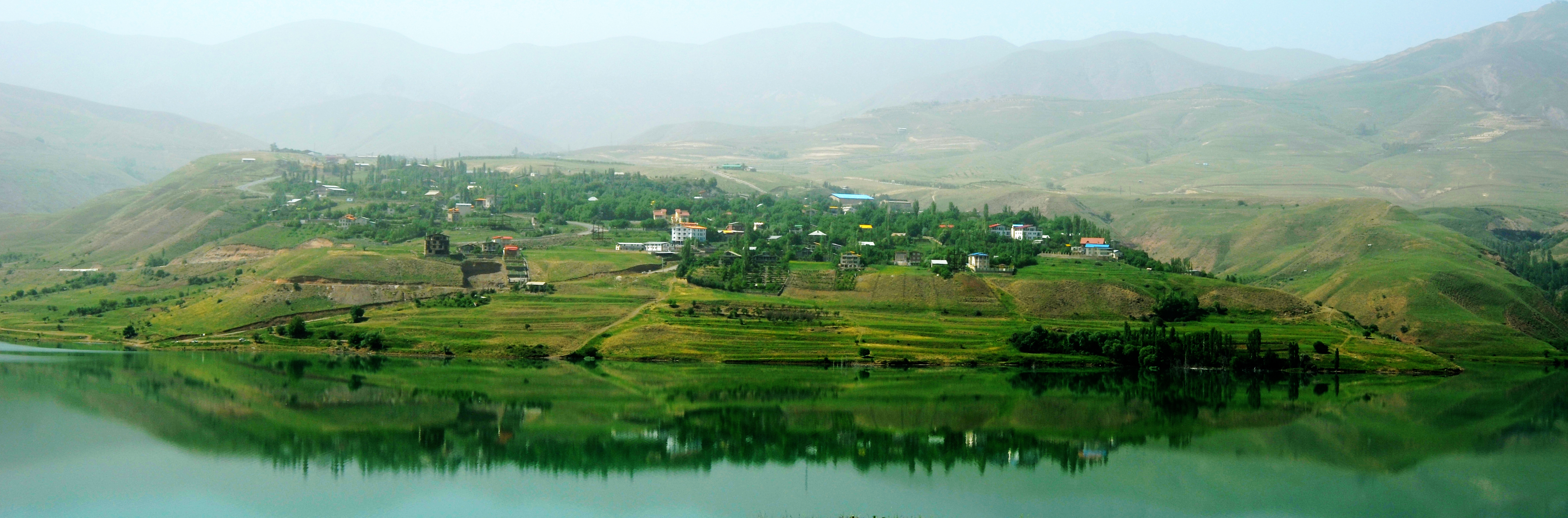

- Location of Taleqan County in Alborz province (top, purple)

- Location of Alborz province in Iran
- Coordinates: 36°13′N 50°49′E
- Country: Iran
- Province: Alborz
- Established: 2008
- Capital: Taleqan
- Districts: Central, Bala Taleqan

Area
  - Total: 1,117 km^{2} (431 sq mi)
- Elevation: 1,830 m (6,000 ft)

Population (2016)
  - Total: 16,815
  - Density: 15.05/km^{2} (38.99/sq mi)
- Time zone: UTC+3:30 (IRST)
- Main language(s): Persian, Tati

Taleqan County (Persian: شهرستان طالقان) is in Alborz province, Iran. Its capital is the city of Taleqan. (Note: Formerly the village of Shahrak)

The area is known for its mild, sunny summers and cold winters. Nasser al-Din Shah Qajar is quoted as saying of Taleqan weather: Har che dar Tehran harf ast, dar inja barf ast (As much as there is politics in Tehran, there is snow here).

== Etymology ==
Some folk etymology says that the name Taleqan means "separators" in Persian, but Dehkhoda says that: Taleqan root is talcan from talc because of the existence of talc mine there. Talc in English is a loan word from Arabic talq, from Persian talk "talc".

== History ==
In 2008, Taleqan District was separated from Savojbolagh County in establishing Taleqan County, which was divided into two districts of two rural districts each, with Taleqan as its capital and only city at the time. In 2010, the county was separated from Tehran province in the establishment of Alborz province.

== Demographics ==
=== Population ===
At the time of the 2016 National Census, the population was 16,815, in 6,354 households.

=== Administrative divisions ===
Taleqan County's population and administrative structure are shown in the following table.

Taleqan County Population
Administrative Divisions	2016
Central District	9,476
Miyan Taleqan RD	2,271
Pain Taleqan RD	3,660
Taleqan (city)	3,545
Bala Taleqan District	7,339
Jovestan RD (Note: Formerly Bala Taleqan Rural District)	4,193
Kenar Rud RD	3,146
Total	16,815
RD = Rural District

== Economy ==
In recent years, the construction of Taleqan Dam and the installation of its hydroelectric project on Shah Rud river (a right-hand tributary of the Sefid Rud river) has added new dimensions to the region's touristic attractions and infrastructure development, although it is also becoming a serious issue for the environment.

== Notable people ==
Politics:

- Ayatollah Seyed Mahmoud Taleghani, Iranian Revolutionary Leader
- Heshmat Taleqani, a leader in Jungle Movement of Gilan

Science:

- Maryam Mirzakhani first female Fields Medalist
- Reza Mansouri, Physicist
- Reza Shabani، Historian
- Mostafa Ronaghi, Molecular Biologist

Military:

- Valiollah Fallahi, Major General، Chief of Joint Staff of Iran Army
- Amir-Bahman Bagheri, Major General، Commander of Iran Air Force

Art and Literature:

- Darvish Khan, Musician
- Jalal Al-e-Ahmad, Writer
- Abdol Majid Taleqani, Calligrapher
- Gholam Hossein Amirkhani, Calligrapher
- Enayatollah Bakhshi, Actor
- Mohammad Davoudi, Writer

== See also ==
Media related to Taleghan County at Wikimedia Commons
