= Taleqan District =

Former district in Tehran province, Iran

Taleqan District Persian: بخش طالقان
- Former District
- Location within Iran
- Coordinates: 36°13′N 50°49′E
- Country: Iran
- Province: Tehran
- County: Savojbolagh
- Capital: Taleqan

Population (2006)
  - Total: 25,781
- Time zone: UTC+3:30 (IRDT)

Taleqan District (Persian: بخش طالقان) is a former administrative division of Savojbolagh County, Tehran province, Iran. Its capital was the city of Taleqan. (Note: Formerly the village of Shahrak)

== History ==
In 2008, the district was separated from the county in the establishment of Taleqan County.

== Demographics ==
=== Population ===
At the time of the 2006 census, the district's population (as a part of Tehran province) was 25,781 in 7,574 households.

=== Administrative divisions ===
Taleqan District Population
Administrative Divisions	2006
Bala Taleqan RD (Note: Renamed Jovestan Rural District)	6,609
Miyan Taleqan RD	9,873
Pain Taleqan RD	6,018
Taleqan (city)	3,281
Total	25,781
RD: Rural District
