= Savojbolagh County =

County in Alborz province, Iran

Savojbolagh County Persian: شهرستان ساوجبلاغ
- County
- Hashtgerd

- Location of Savojbolagh County in Alborz province (center, pink)

- Location of Alborz province in Iran
- Coordinates: 35°58′N 50°49′E
- Country: Iran
- Province: Alborz
- Established: 1989
- Capital: Hashtgerd
- Districts: Central, Chendar

Area
  - Total: 1,170 km^{2} (450 sq mi)

Population (2016)
  - Total: 259,973
  - Density: 222/km^{2} (575/sq mi)
- Time zone: UTC+3:30 (IRST)

Savojbolagh County (Persian: شهرستان ساوجبلاغ) is in Alborz province, Iran. Its capital is the city of Hashtgerd.

== History ==
The name Savojbolagh (Note: Also romanized as Sāvojbolāgh) is derived from Turkish and means 'cold springs'. The 14th-century author Hamdallah Mustawfi described it as having "a fine climate"; most of its water was drawn from qanats, and it produced a lot of fruit and grain. He wrote that the district had previously been attached to Ray for fiscal purposes under the Seljuk Empire, but under Mongol rule it had been detached. Its inhabitants, he wrote, were nomads who were "indifferent to religious matters". The main villages were Sonqorabad, Najmabad, and Kharav. The district's tax revenues he listed as 12,000 dinars.

In 2007, two villages merged to form the new city of Seyfabad, renamed Golsar in 2010.

Taleqan District was separated from the county in establishing Taleqan County in 2008. In 2020, Chaharbagh District (Note: Renamed the Central District of Chaharbagh County) was separated from the county to establish Chaharbagh County. The city of Shahr-e Jadid-e Hashtgerd was renamed Mehestan in 2023.

== Demographics ==
=== Population ===
At the time of the 2006 census, the county's population (as a part of Tehran province) was 215,086 in 57,497 households. The 2016 census measured the population of the county as 259,973 in 80,953 households.

=== Administrative divisions ===
Savojbolagh County's population history and administrative structure over two censuses are shown in the following table.

Savojbolagh County Population (Note: As a part of Tehran province at the 2006 census)
Administrative Divisions	2006	2016
Central District	106,879	153,675
Hiv RD	14,352	15,164
Saidabad RD	31,576	26,979
Golsar (city) (Note: Merger of two villages as the city of Seyfabad, later renamed Golsar)		13,745
Hashtgerd (city)	45,332	55,640
Mehestan (city) (Note: Formerly Shahr-e Jadid-e Hashtgerd)	15,619	42,147
Chaharbagh District (Note: Transferred to Chaharbagh County)	61,135	77,409
Chahardangeh RD	38,598	5,233
Ramjin RD	16,960	23,348
Chaharbagh (city) (Note: Formerly the village of Chahar Dangeh)	5,577	48,828
Chendar District	21,291	28,841
Baraghan RD	1,424	3,949
Chendar RD	12,110	13,952
Kuhsar (city)	7,757	10,940
Taleqan District (Note: Transferred to Taleqan County)	25,781	
Bala Taleqan RD (Note: Renamed Jovestan Rural District)	6,609	
Miyan Taleqan RD	9,873	
Pain Taleqan RD	6,018	
Taleqan (city) (Note: Formerly the village of Shahrak)	3,281	
Total	215,086	259,973
RD = Rural District

== See also ==
Media related to Savojbolagh County at Wikimedia Commons
