= Bara Kashipur =

Bara Kashipur Barakashipur
- Village
- Nickname: kashipur
- Location in West Bengal, India
- Coordinates: 25.258604°N 88.730630°E
- Country: India
- State: West Bengal
- District: Dakshin Dinajpur

Government
  - Pradhan: AITC
- Elevation: 24 m (79 ft)

Population (2011)
  - Total: 926

Languages
  - Official: Bengali, English
- Time zone: UTC+5:30 (IST)
- PIN: 733 102
- Telephone code: 03522
- Vehicle registration: WB-61/WB-62
- Lok Sabha constituency: Balurghat
- Vidhan Sabha constituency: Tapan

Bara Kashipur (also called Barakashipur) is the small village located in Balurghat of the Dakshin Dinajpur district of West Bengal in India. Hili (Bangladesh border) is situated few kilometers from the heart of the village.

== Geography ==
Barakashipur is located at 25.258°N 88.730°E.

== Demographics ==
In the 2011 census, Bara Kashipur Rural Agglomeration had a population of 926, out of which 82,466 were 450 males and 476 were females. The 0–6 years population was 92. Effective literacy rate for the 7+ population was 67.71 per cent.

Caste Factor: In Bara Kashipur village, most of the village population is from Schedule Tribe (ST). Schedule Tribe (ST) constitutes 38.34% while Schedule Caste (SC) were 4.00% of total population in Bara Kashipur village.

Work Profile: In Bara Kashipur village out of total population, 386 were engaged in work activities. 92.23% of workers describe their work as Main Work (Employment or Earning more than 6 Months) while 7.77% were involved in Marginal activity providing livelihood for less than 6 months. Of 386 workers engaged in Main Work, 138 were cultivators (owner or co-owner) while 168 were Agricultural labourer.

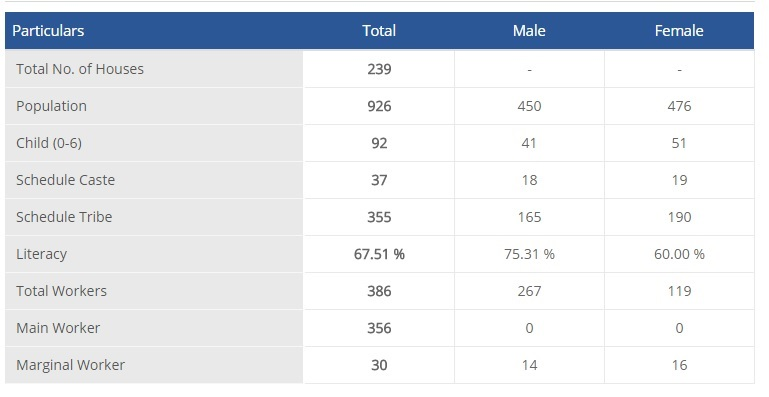

== Bara Kashipur Forest ==
This is a reserve forest which has led to Kashipur forest and it is dense enough compared to other spots of the forest. It is an island in the forest surrounded by the Kashiya creek. It's isolated from the main land.

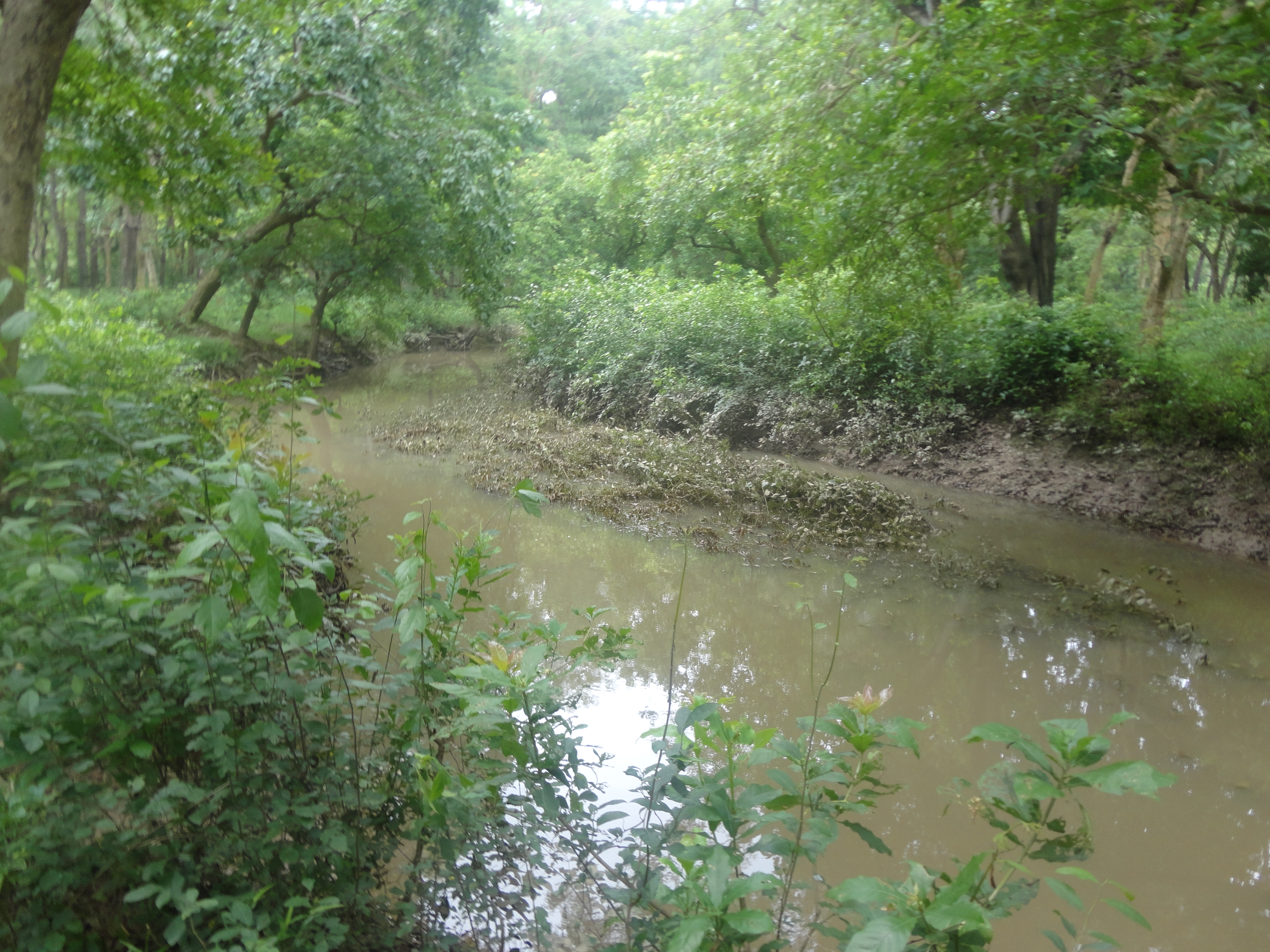
Barakashipur Forest

== Economics ==
Bara Kashipur is a crop cultivation area of Balurghat distribution centre in northern West Bengal. The main goods traded here include rice, wheat, jute, sugar cane, and oilseeds. Also some amount of jute is grown in the outskirts of the town.

== Transportation ==
Already well-connected by road to Balurghat, Malda, Siliguri, Kolkata, Raiganj and other premier cities in North Bengal. The nearest railway station is Balurghat railway station, as well located on the eastern bank of River Atrayee. The railway line to Balurghat commences at Eklakhi railway station in Maldah district, is now connected to Kolkata via Gour Exp and Tebhaga Exp. The distance between Eklakhi and Balurghat is about 79 km and it crosses two rivers en route - Tangon and Punarbhaba. Three trains connect Balurghat to Kolkata directly. They are: 1. Gour Express (Departure 5:05pm everyday) 2. Tebhaga Express (Departure 6 am daily except Sunday) 3. Balurghat Howrah bi-weekly Express (Departure 8:30pm every Monday and Tuesday) One train connect Balurghat to New Jalpaiguri. This is Balurghat-NJP intercity express. One train connects Balurghat to Malda too, Balurghat - Malda Town DEMU Passenger

== Education ==
=== Schools ===
The Barakashipur F.P. School is the only primary school located in the heart of the village.

=== Hospital ===
There is a small village hospital in the western part of the village.

== Festivals ==
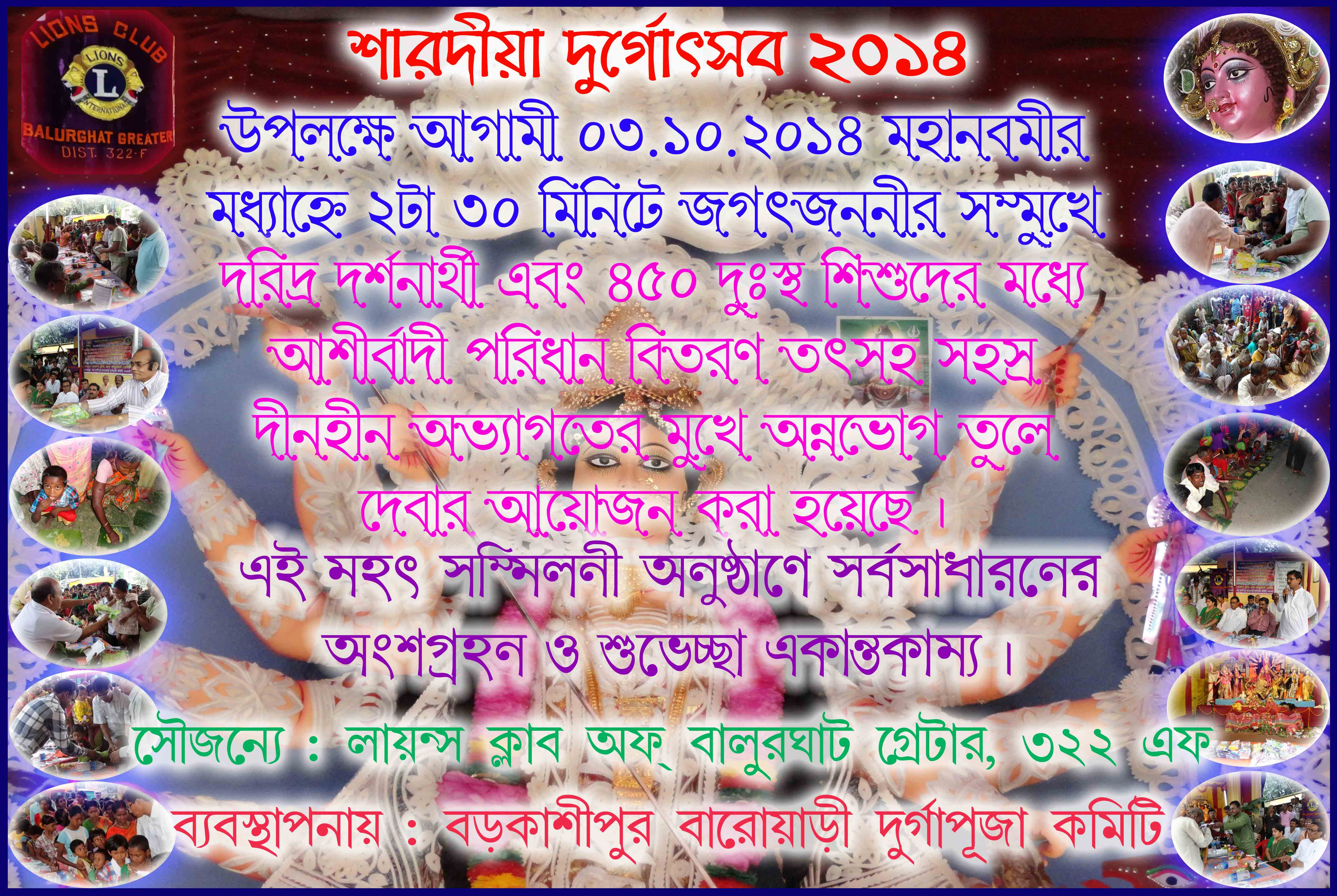
Dress and Food Distribution Programme in Barakashipur Durga Puja, organised by Lions Club Balurghat and Barakashipur Durga Puja Committee

Durga Puja, Kali Puja, Saraswati puja and Biswakarma Puja are widely celebrated at Barakashipur. The Bara Kashipur Durga Puja, arranged by Barakashipur Durga Puja committee is the famous festival and DURGA PUJA MELA in the Dakshin Dinajpur. Rajuah Kali Mela is celebrated at Rajuha, approx 1.5 km from Barakashipur. Bolla Kali Puja is celebrated at Bolla, approximately 6 kilometers from Barakashipur.

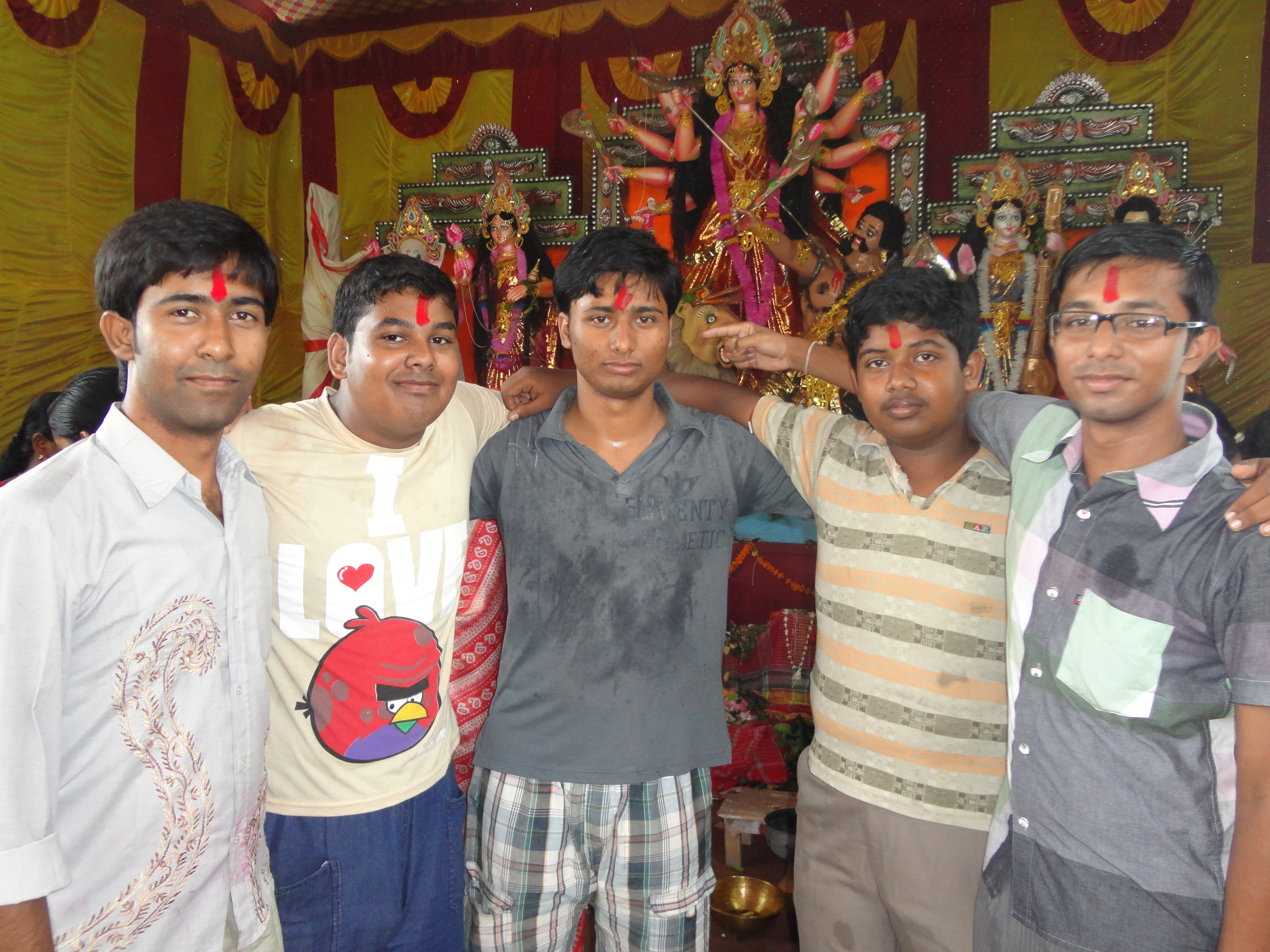
A great moment of Durga Puja 2013

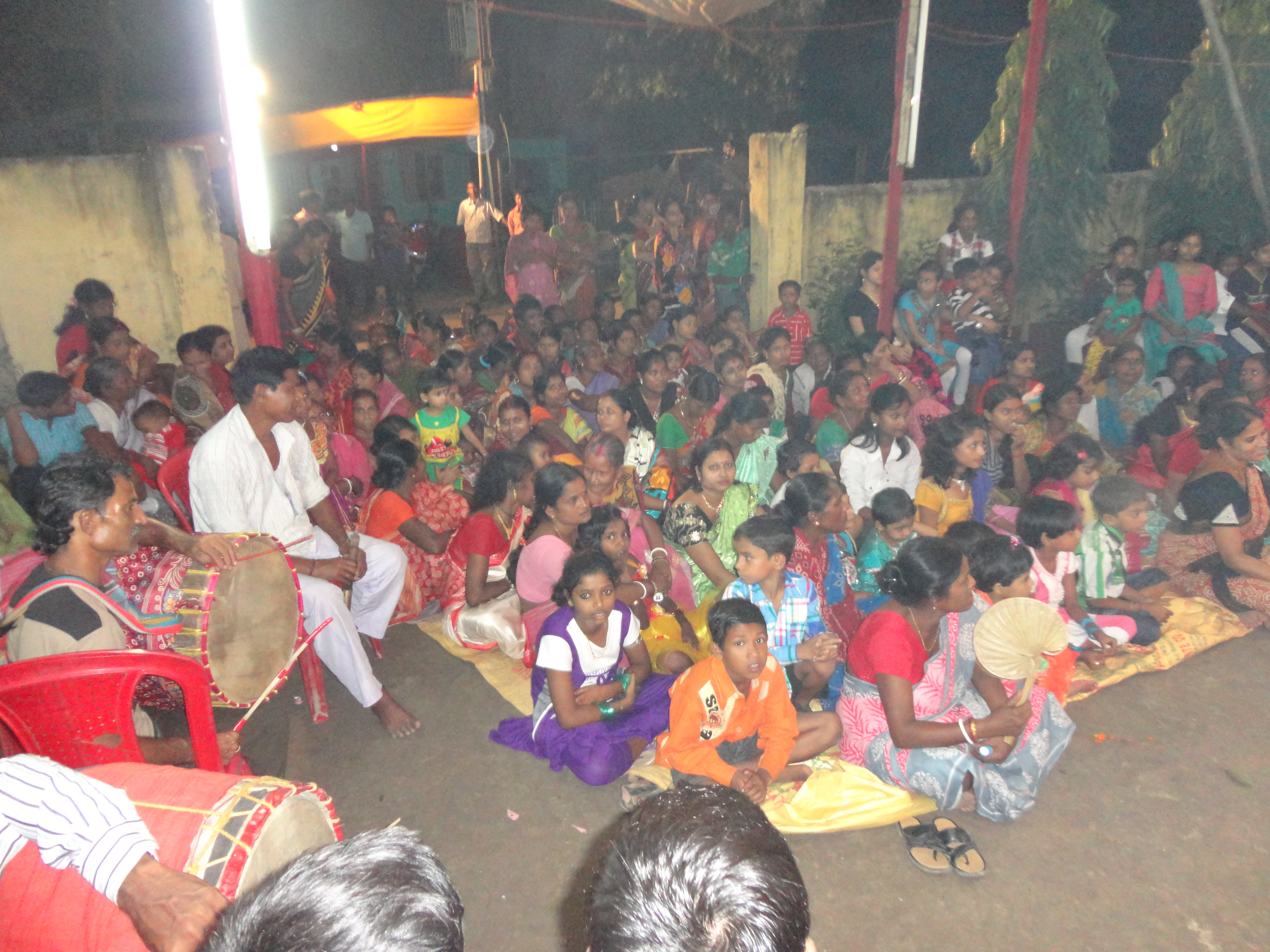
Durga Puja Mandop 2013

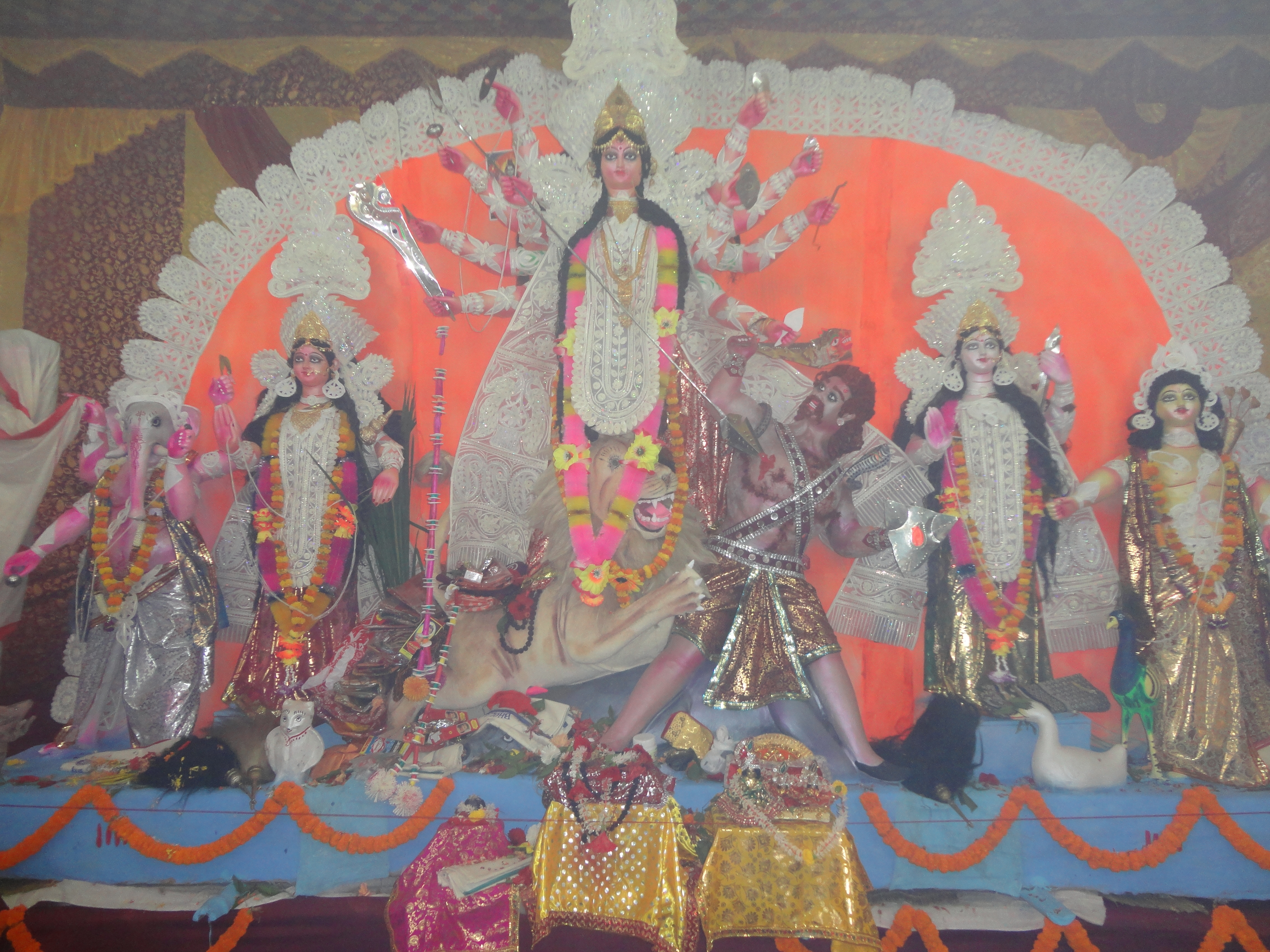
BARAKASHIPUR DURGA PUJA 2014, ORGANISED BY BARAKASHIPUR DURGA PUJA COMMITTEE

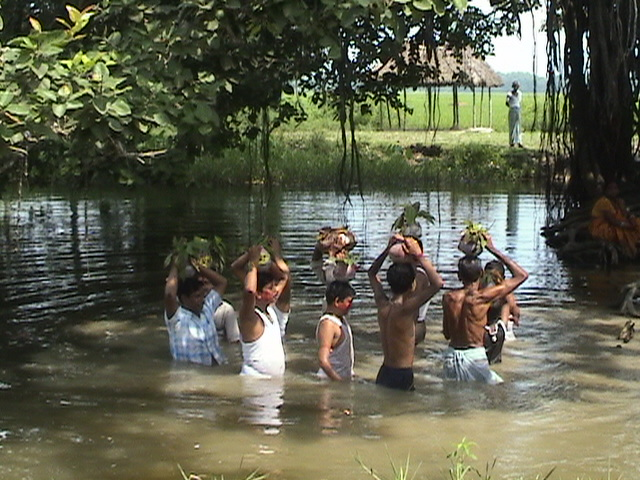
The Bijaya Dashomi Of Barakashipur Durga Puja 2008

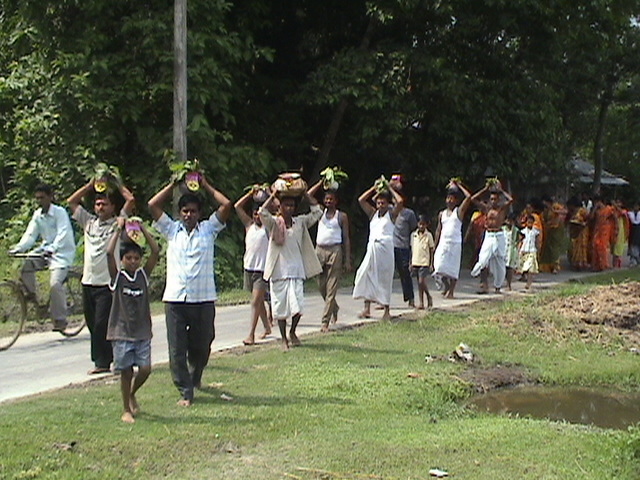
The last moment Bijaya Dashomi Of Durga Puja 2008

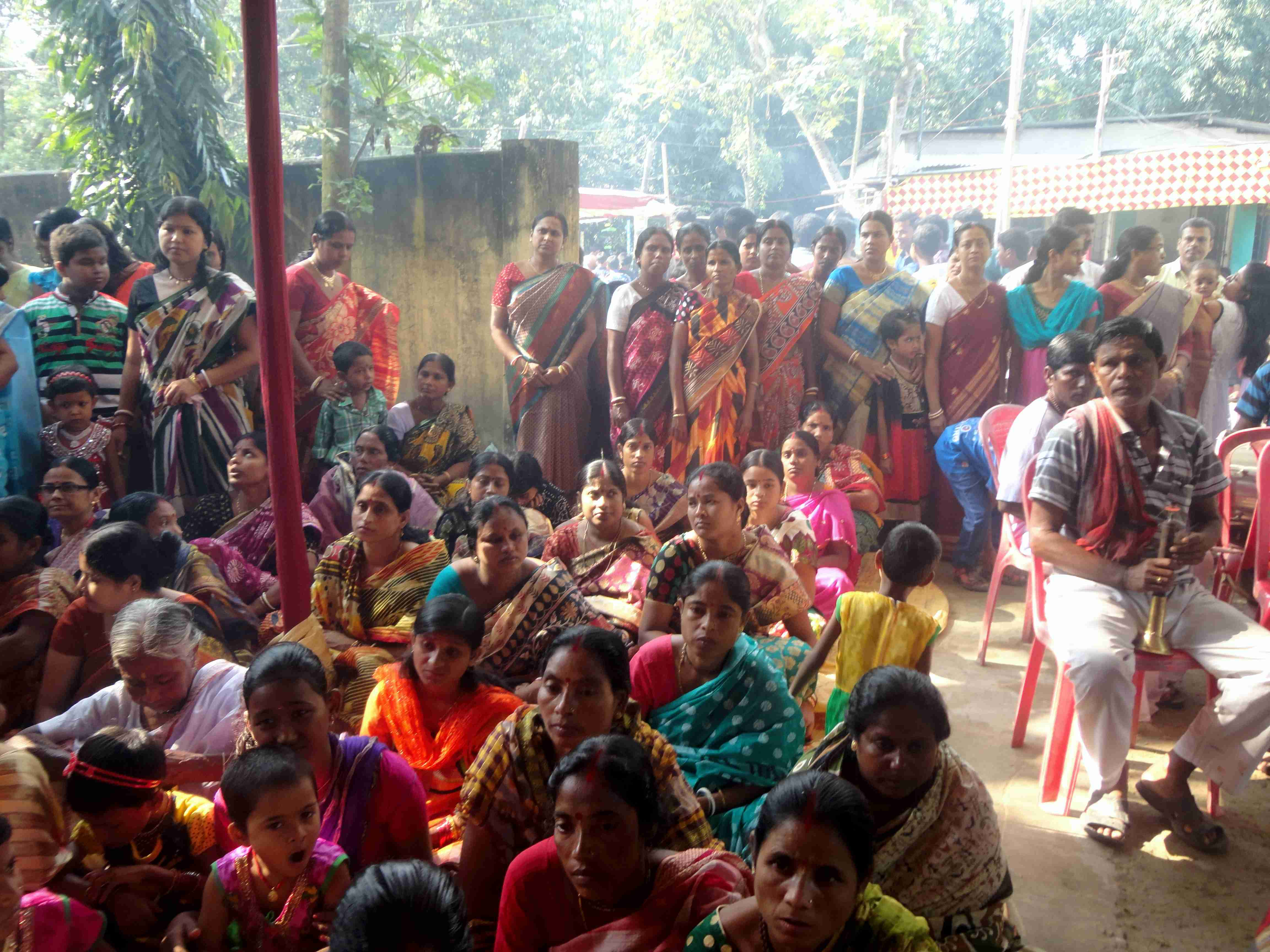
DURGA PUJA MANDOP OF BARAKASHIPUR, 2014

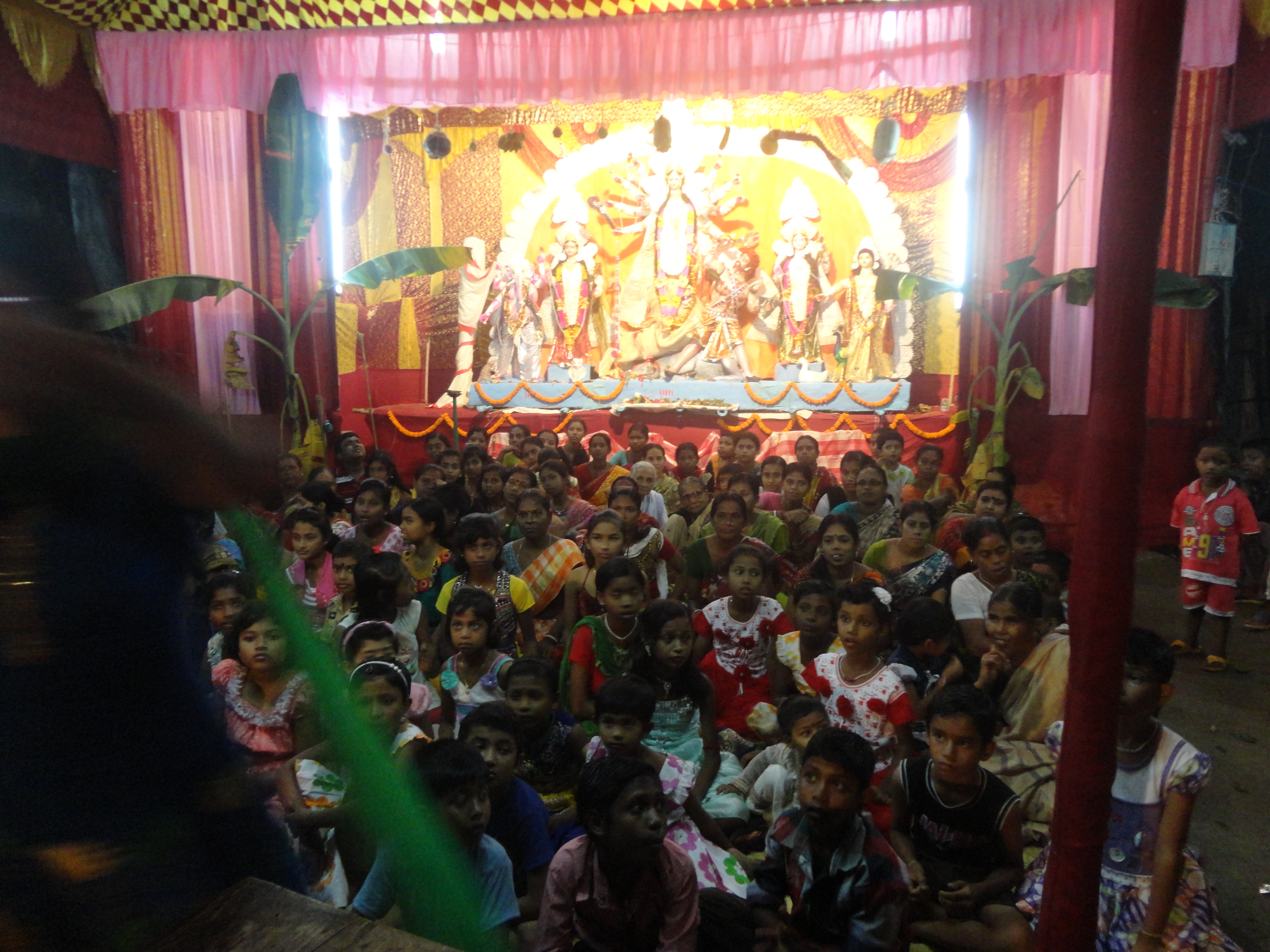
Durga Puja Mandop 2010

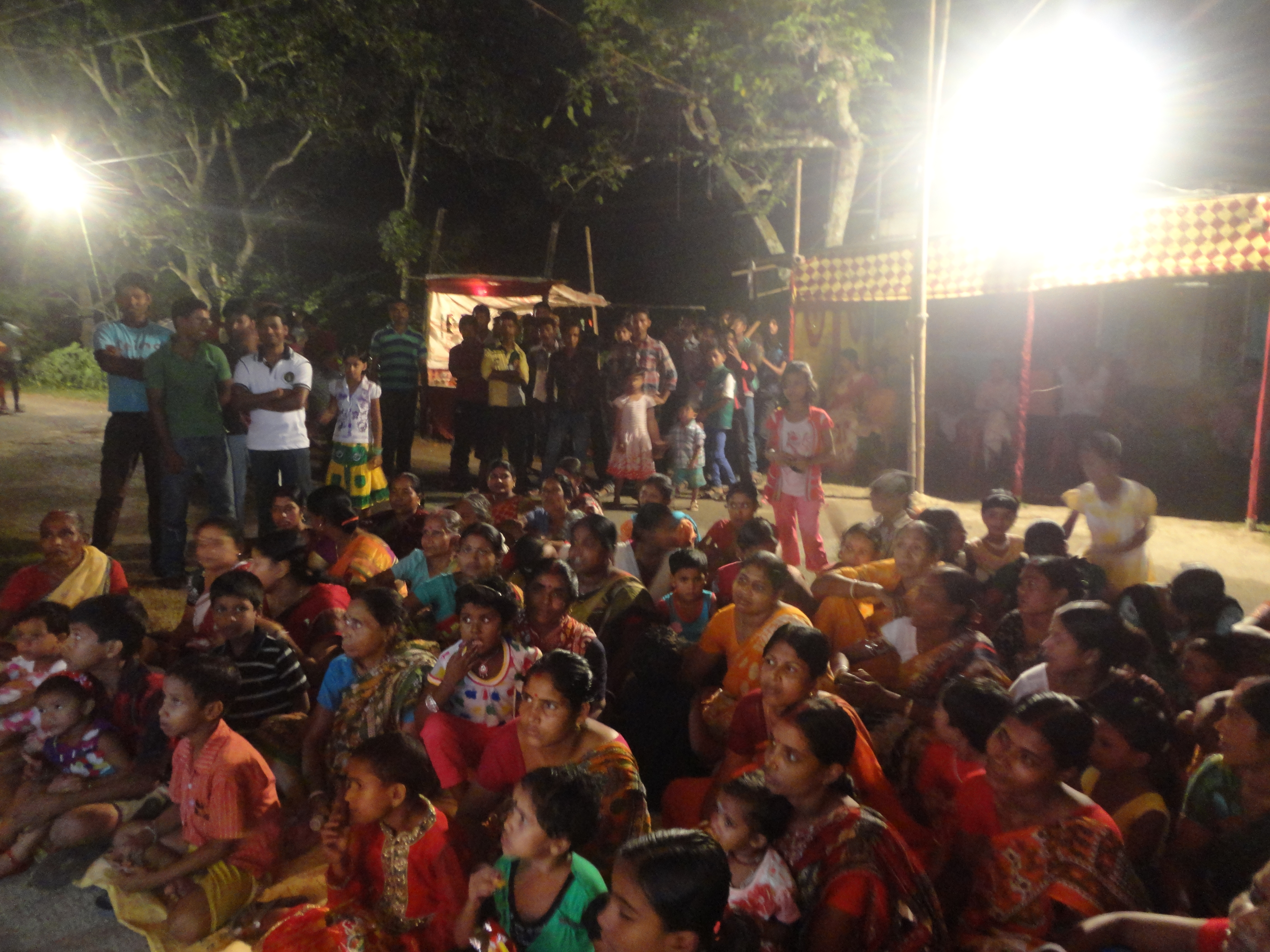
Viewer of Durga Puja Astami

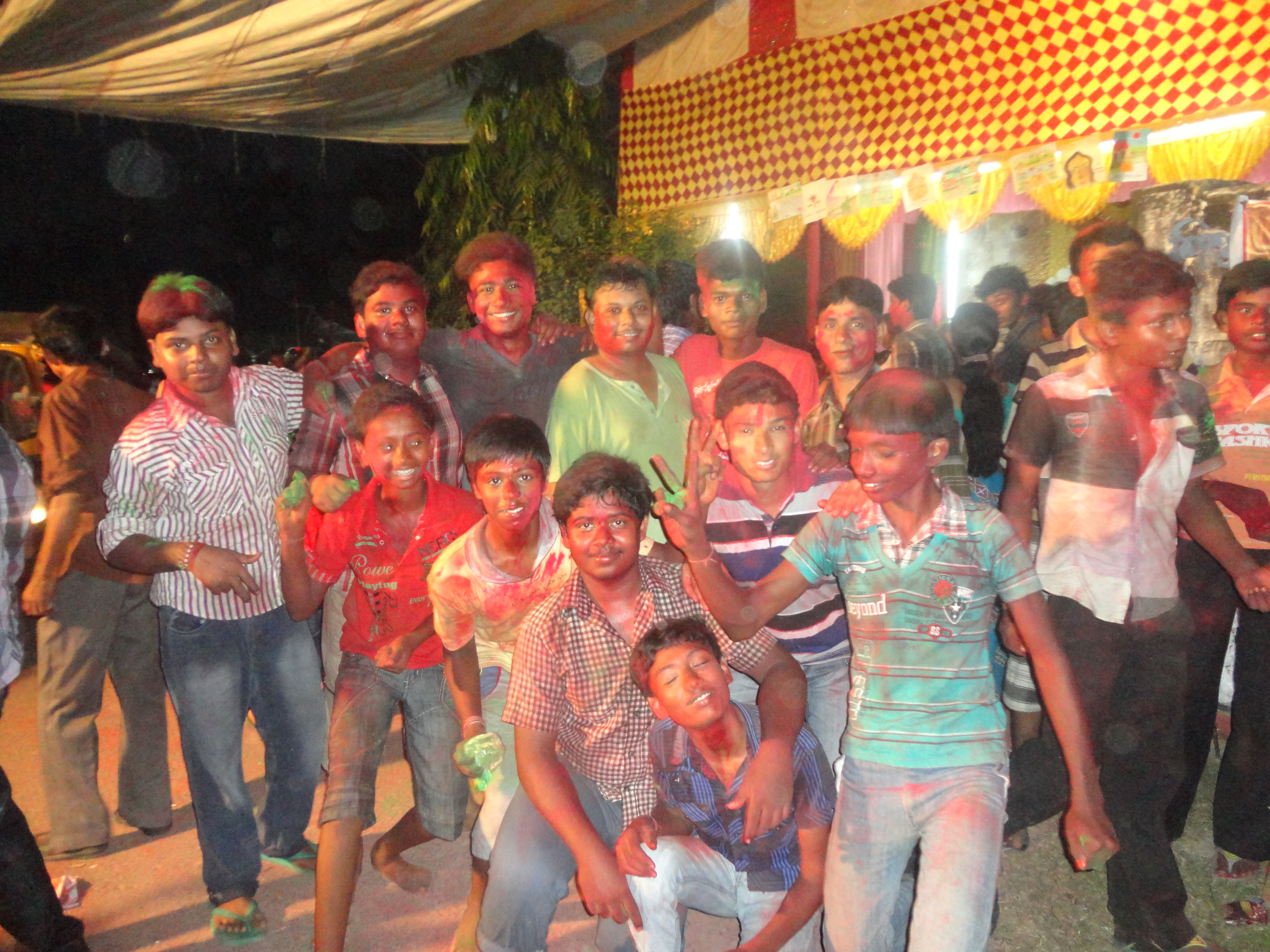
Bijaya Dashami Festival 2014

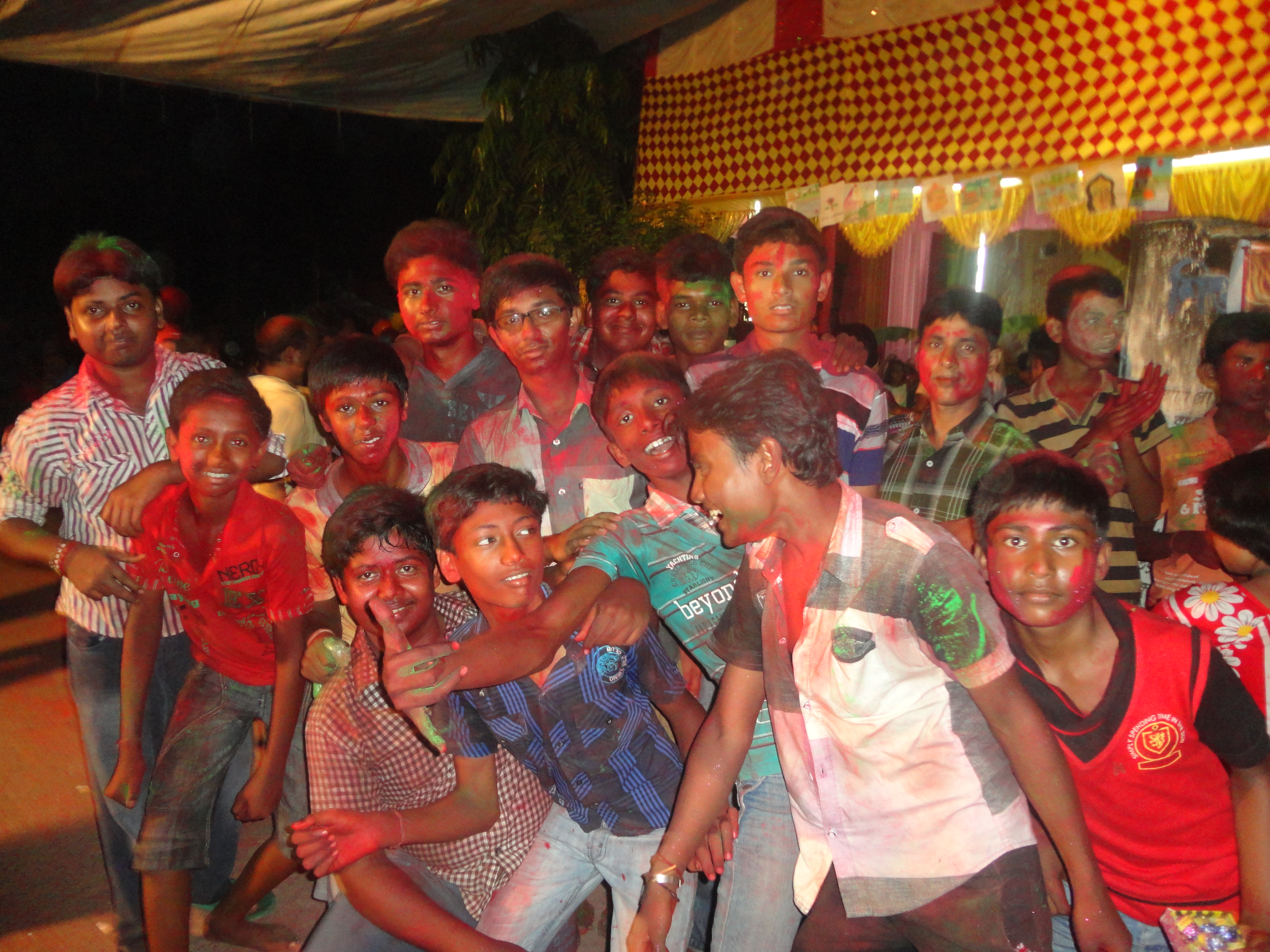
Bijaya Dashami Festival of Barakashipur 2014

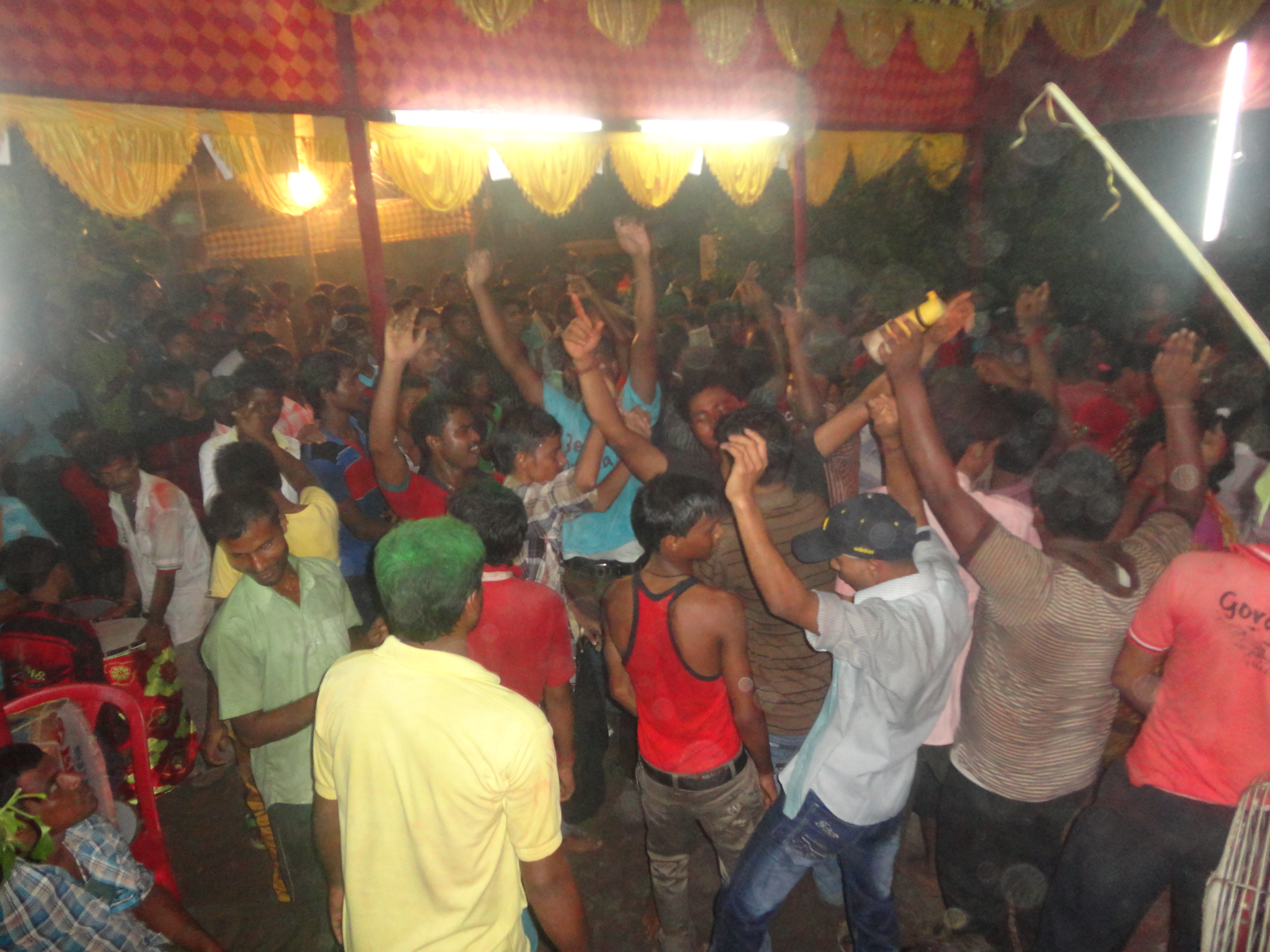
Dancing at Barakashipur Puja Mandap, 2014

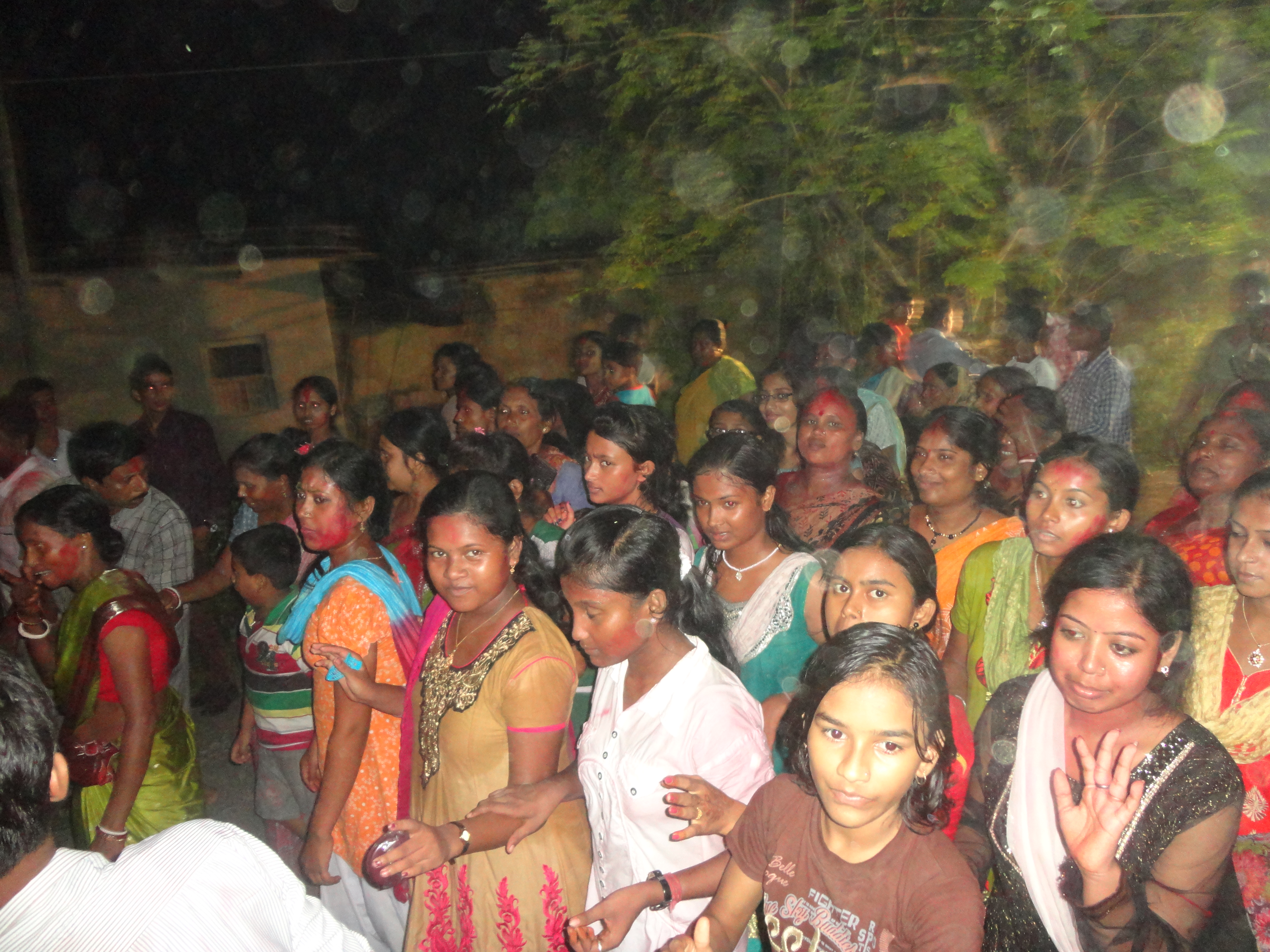
Dancing by Villagers in Durga Puja

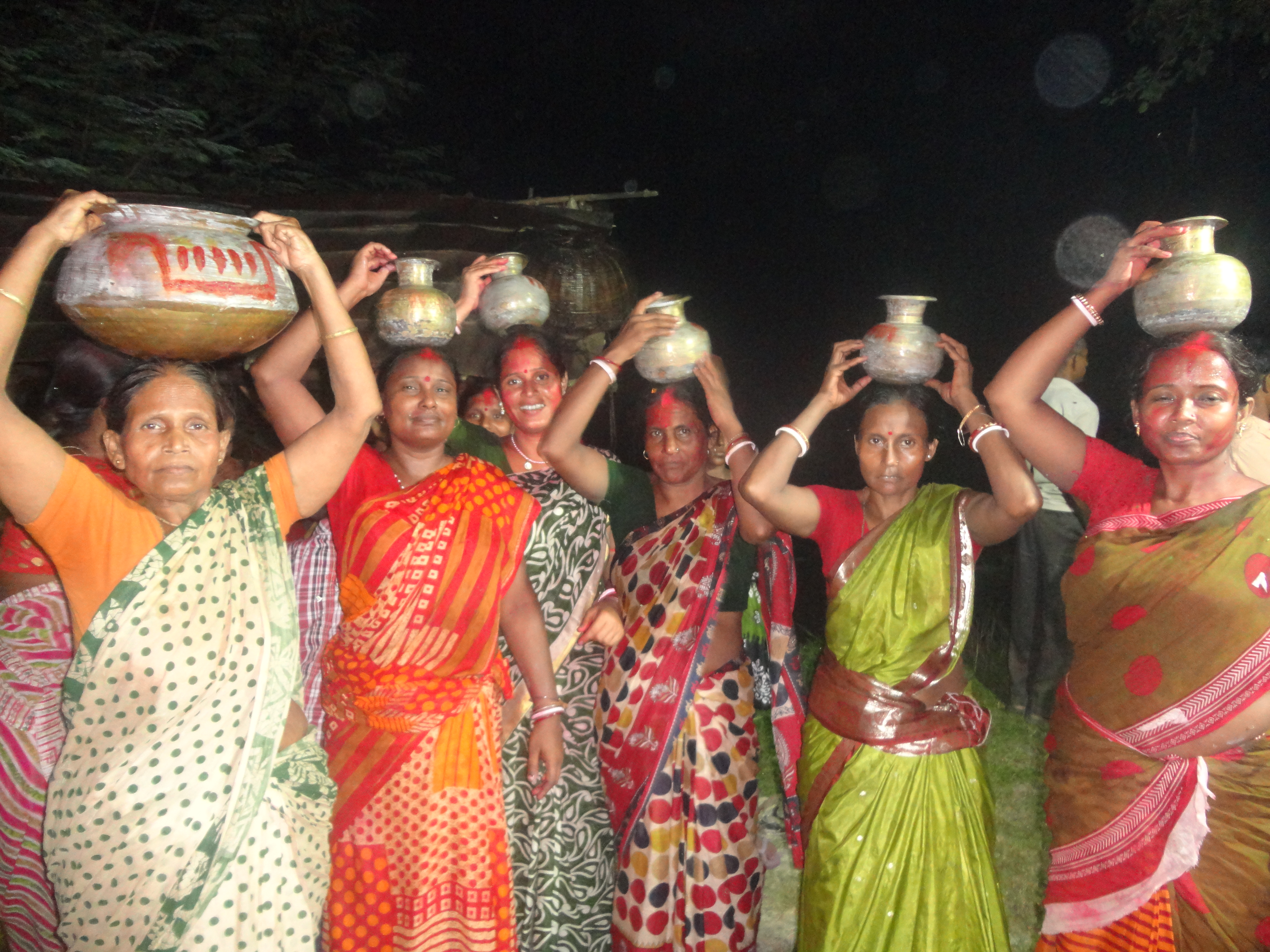
Durga Puja Ghat Vasan

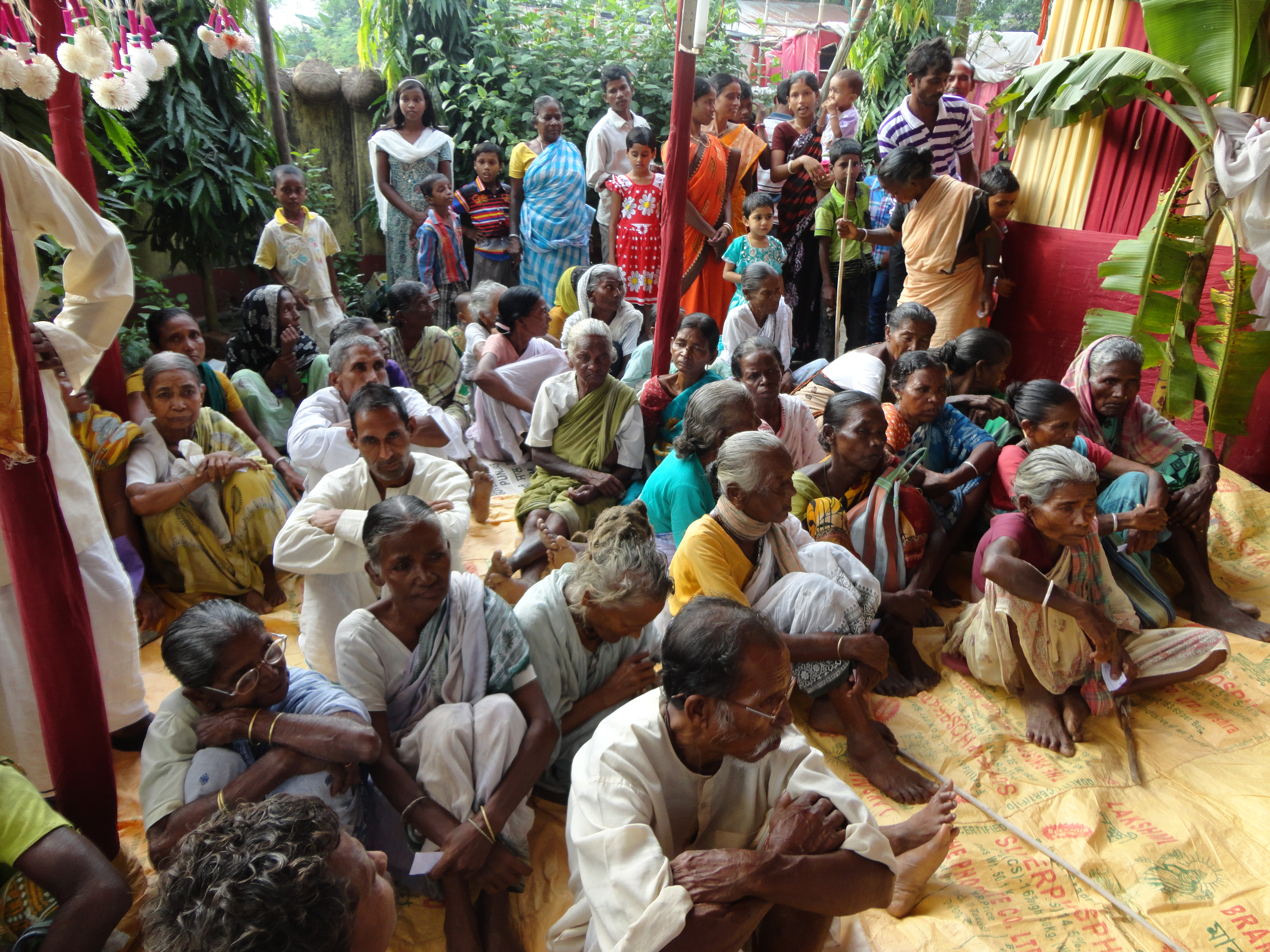
Dress distribution in Barakashipur Durga Puja 2014

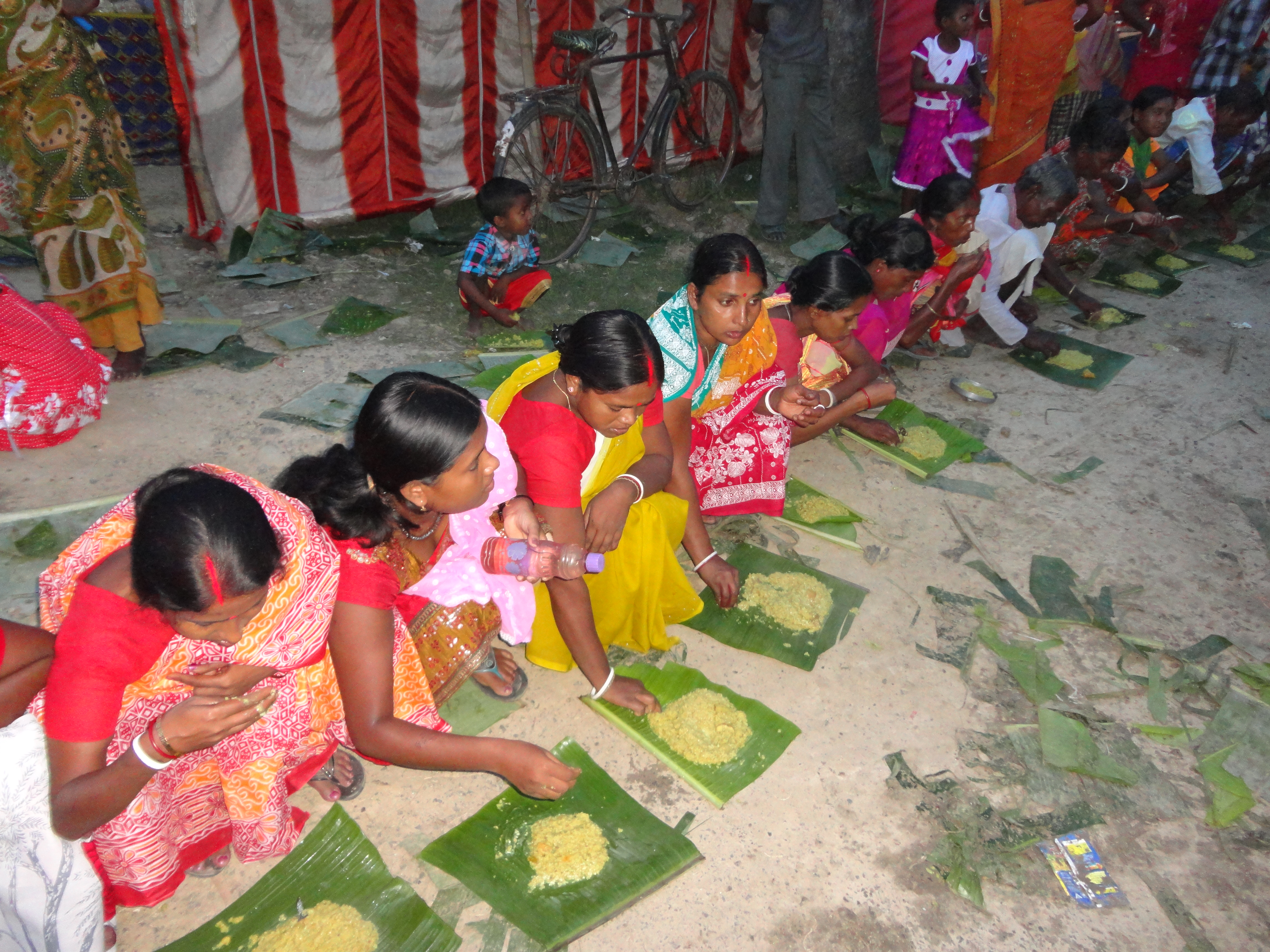
Durga Puja Khichuri Prasad

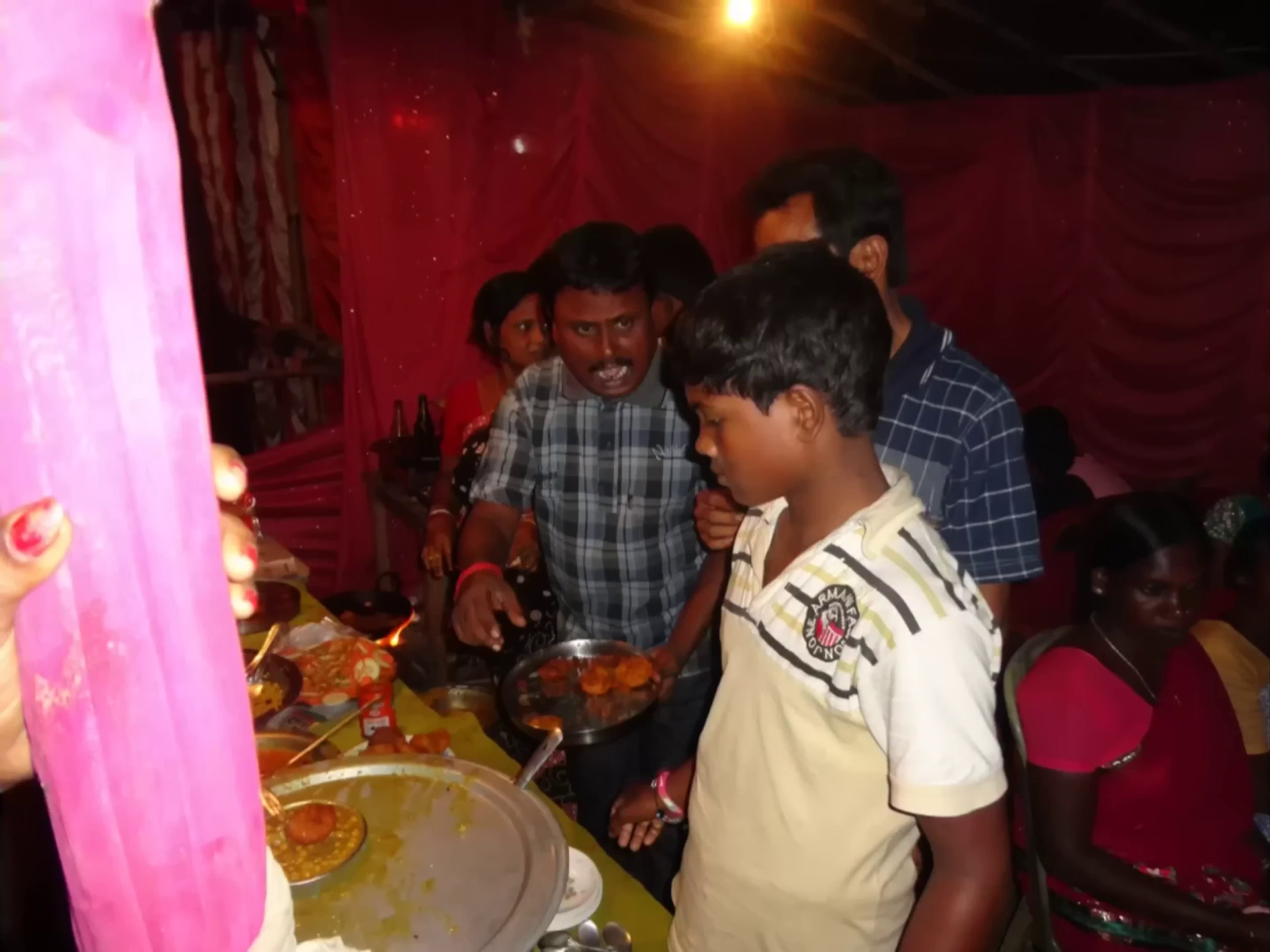
Durga Puja mela 2013

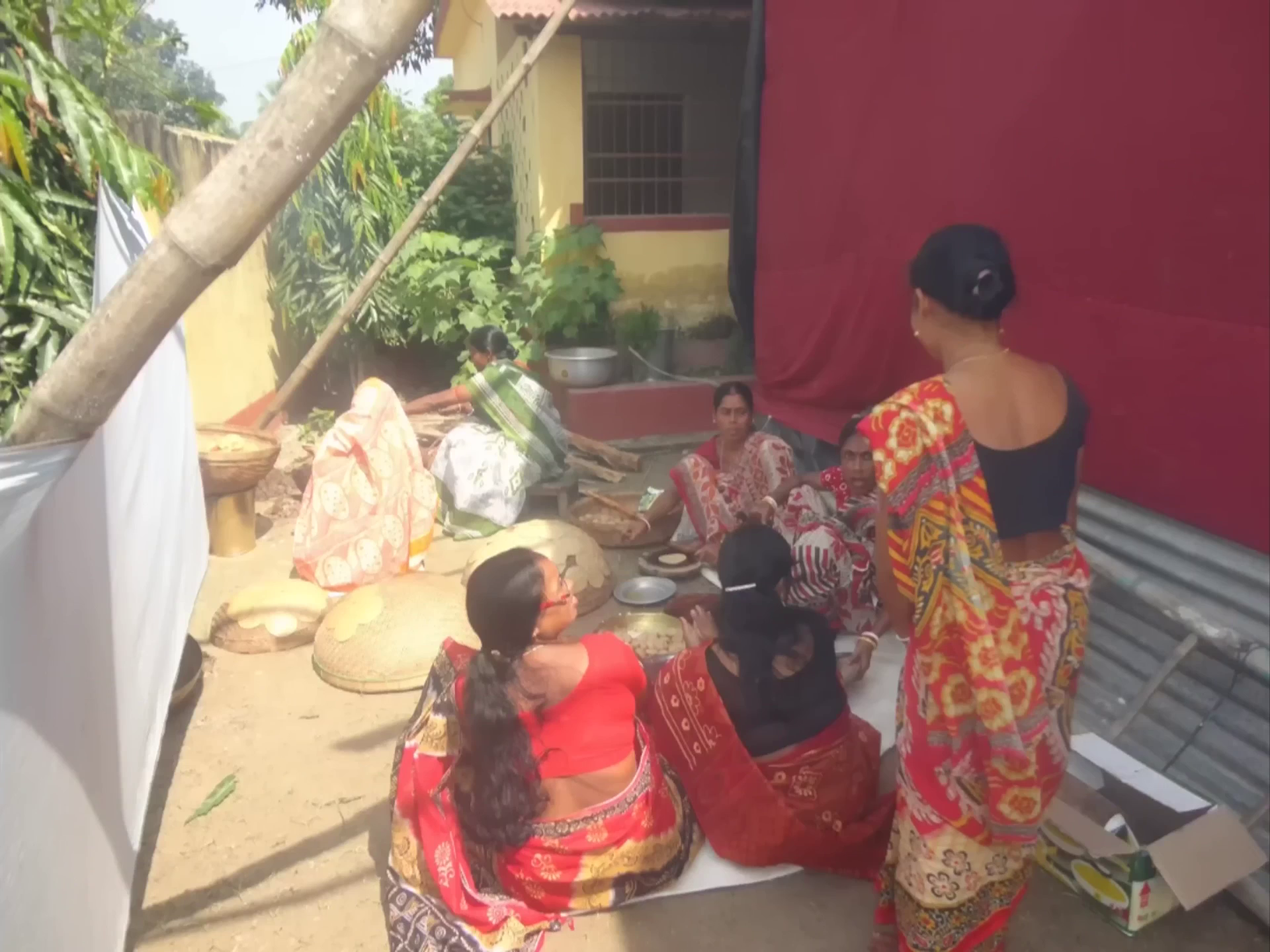
Prasad of Maha Astami arrangement by village ladies

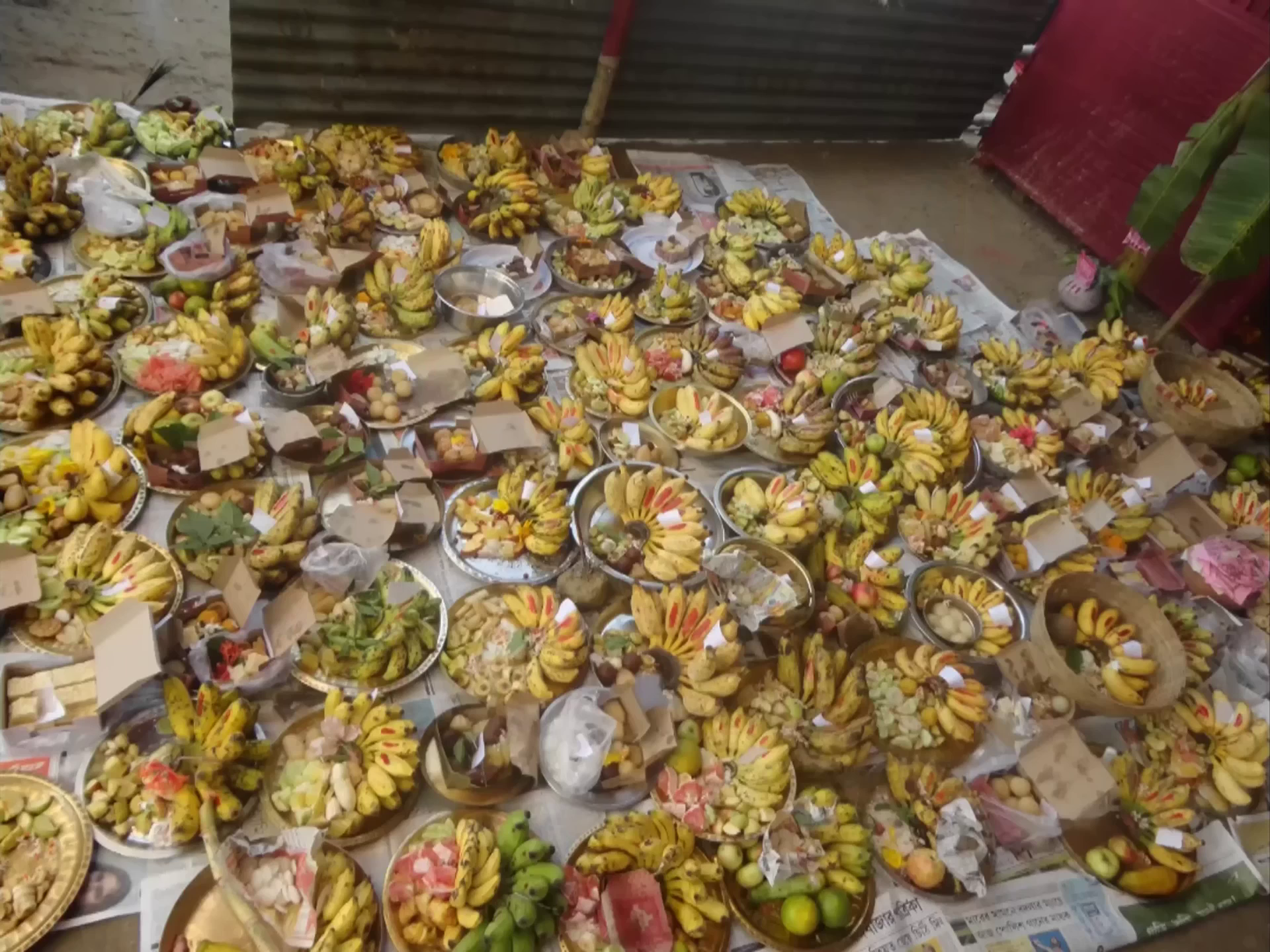
Vog of Durga Puja

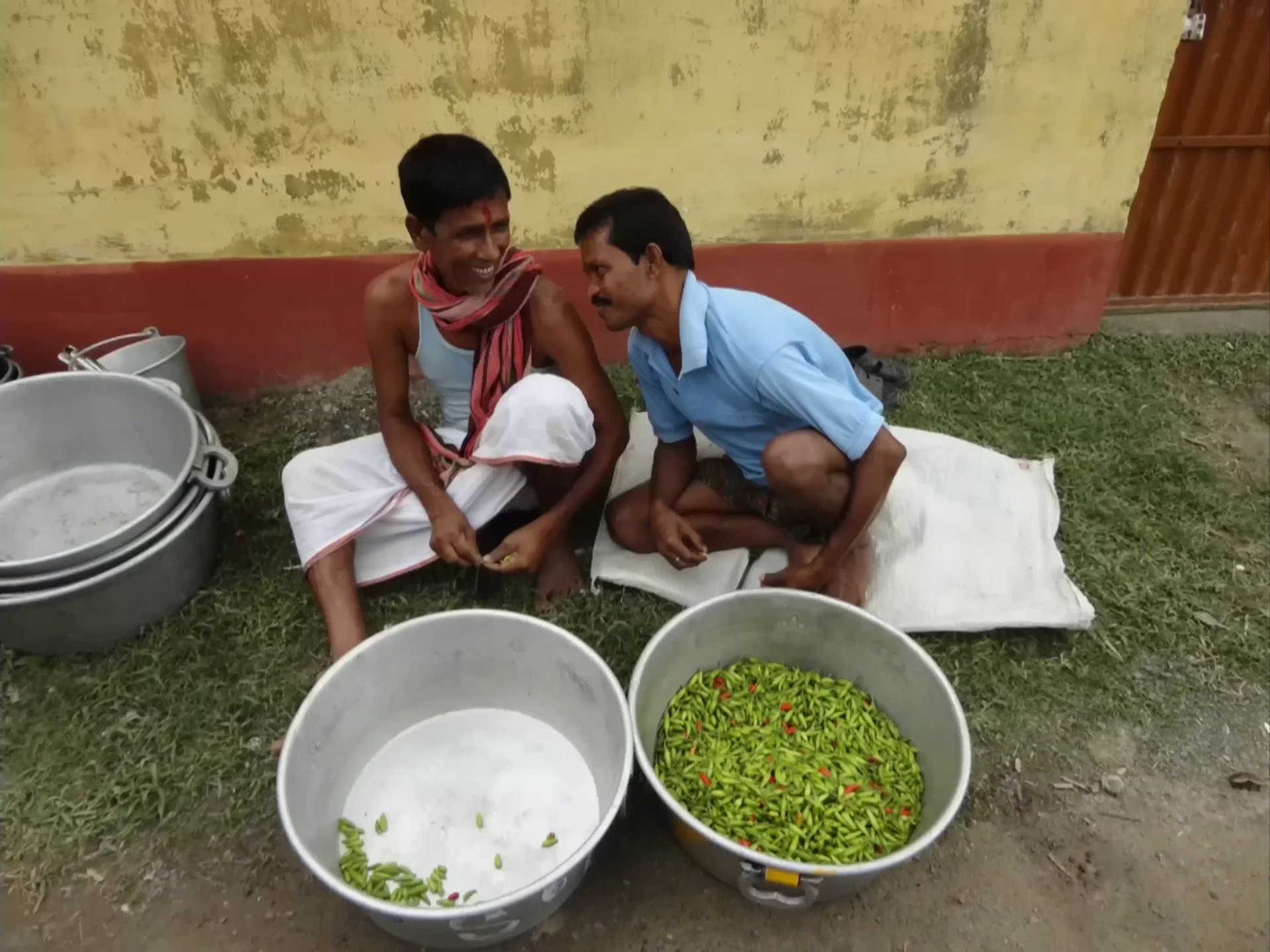
Khichuri arrangement by village people

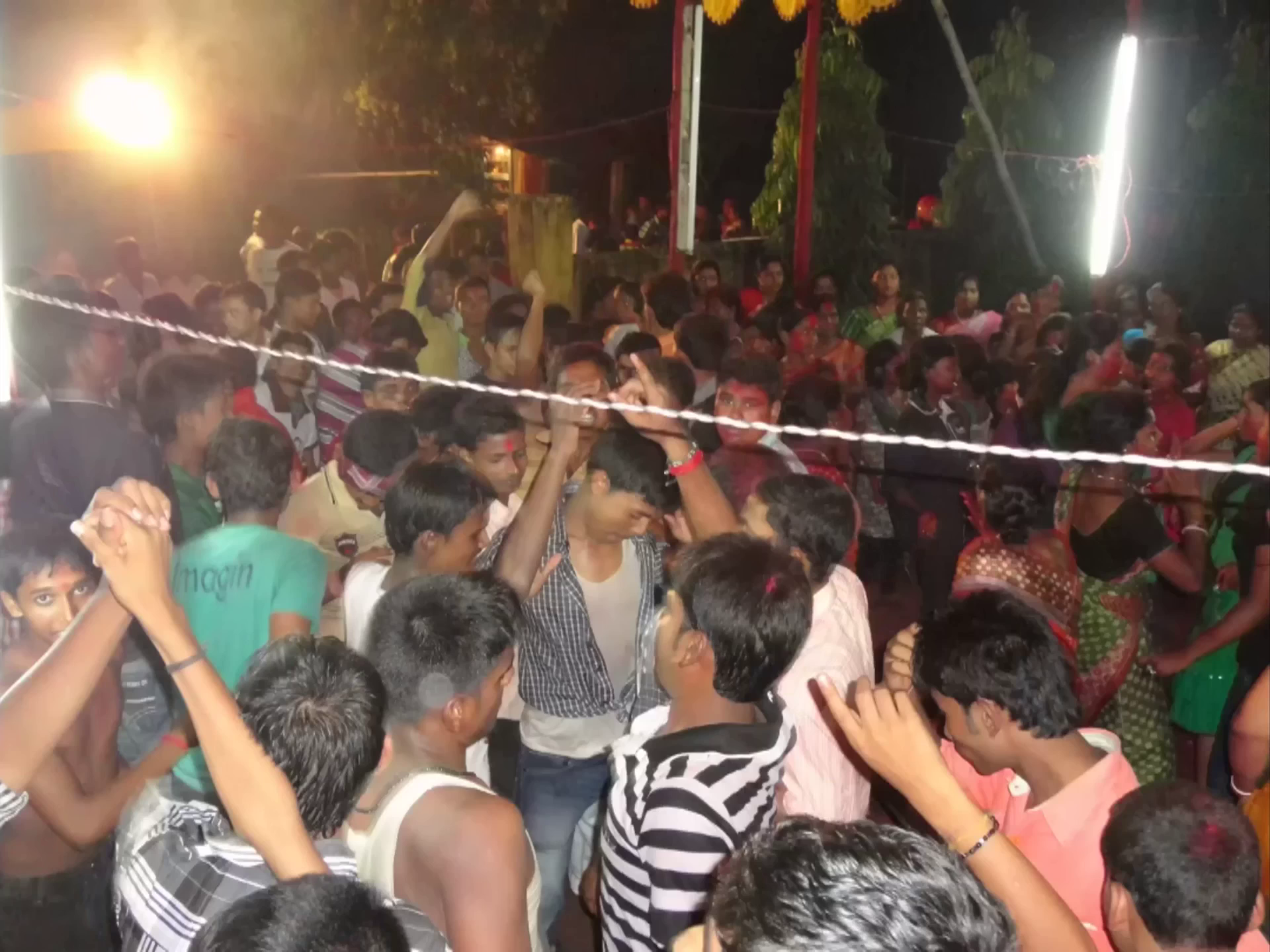
Dance in Durga Puja Dashami

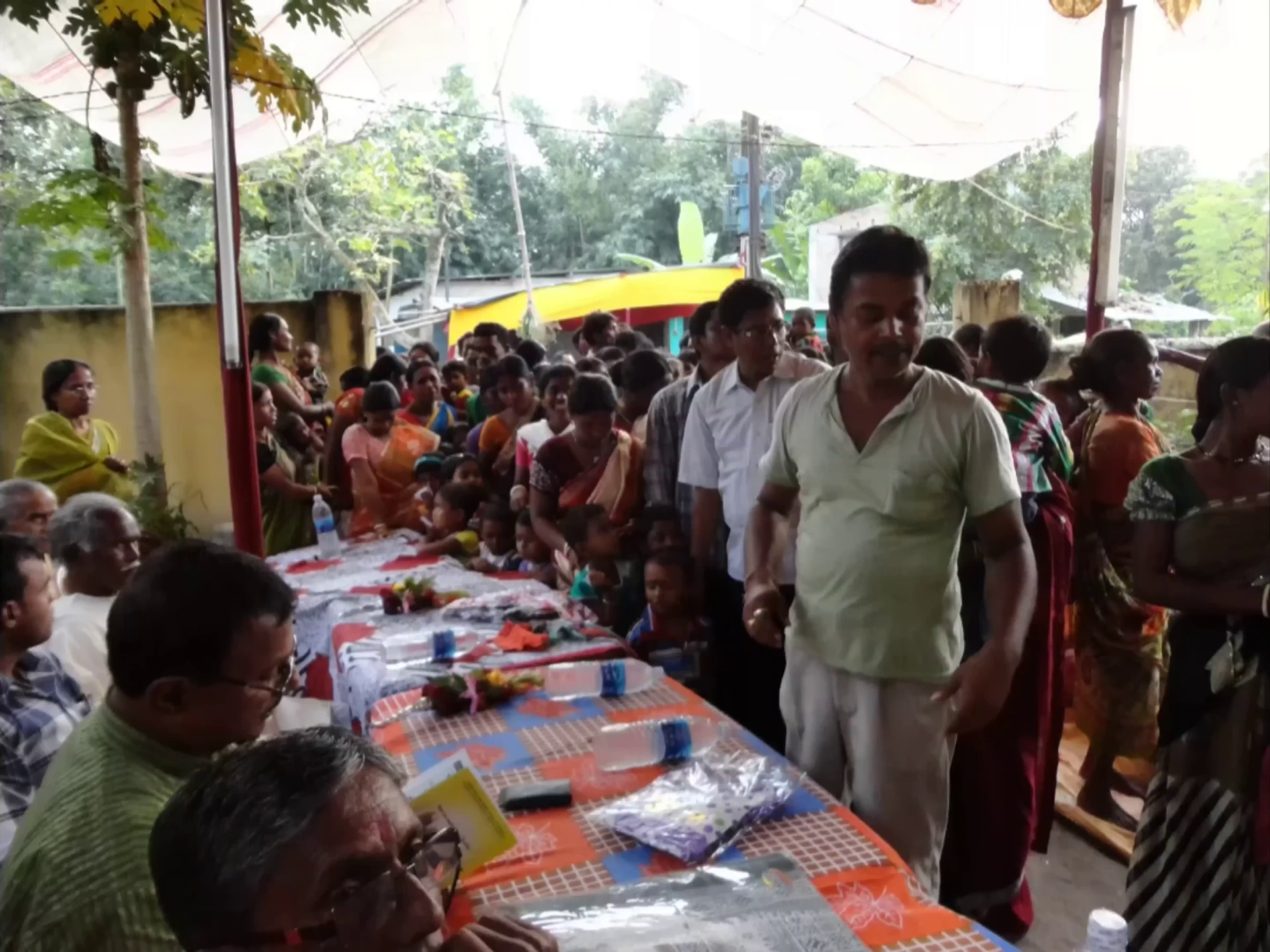
Dress distribution by Lions Clubs members

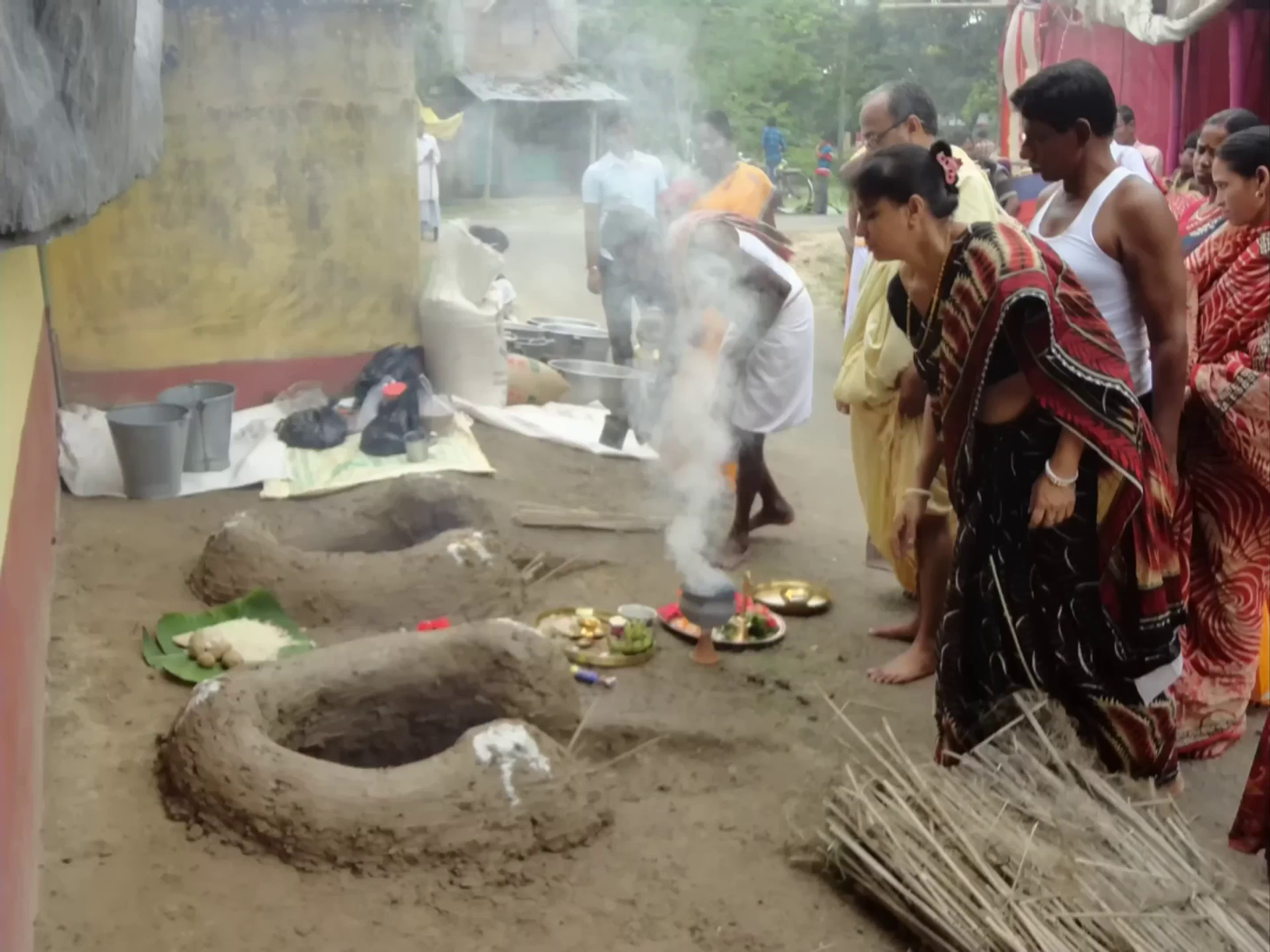
Preparation of Khichuri Vog

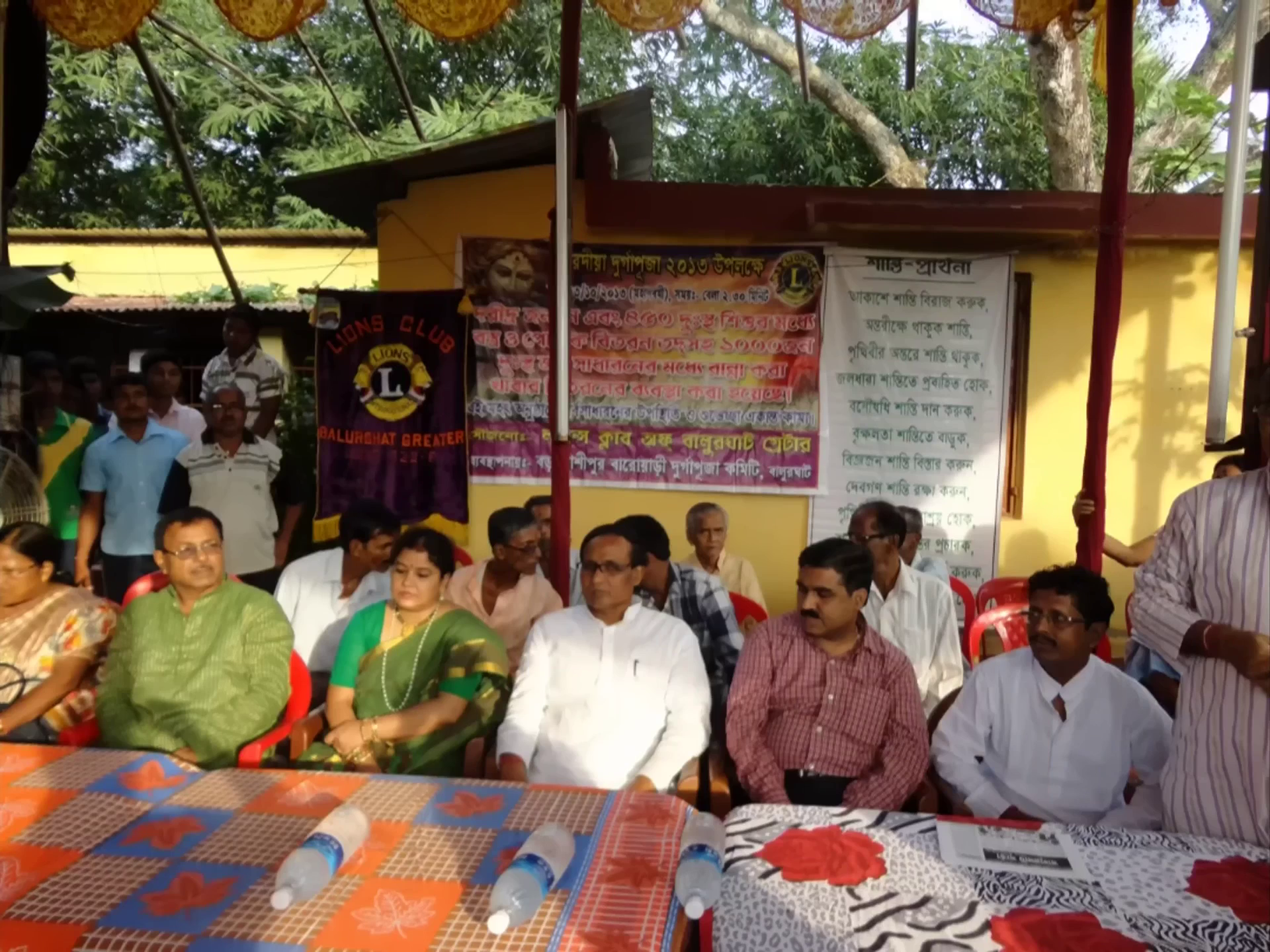
Guest of Barakashipur Durga Puja, notable person DM of Dakshin Dinajpur

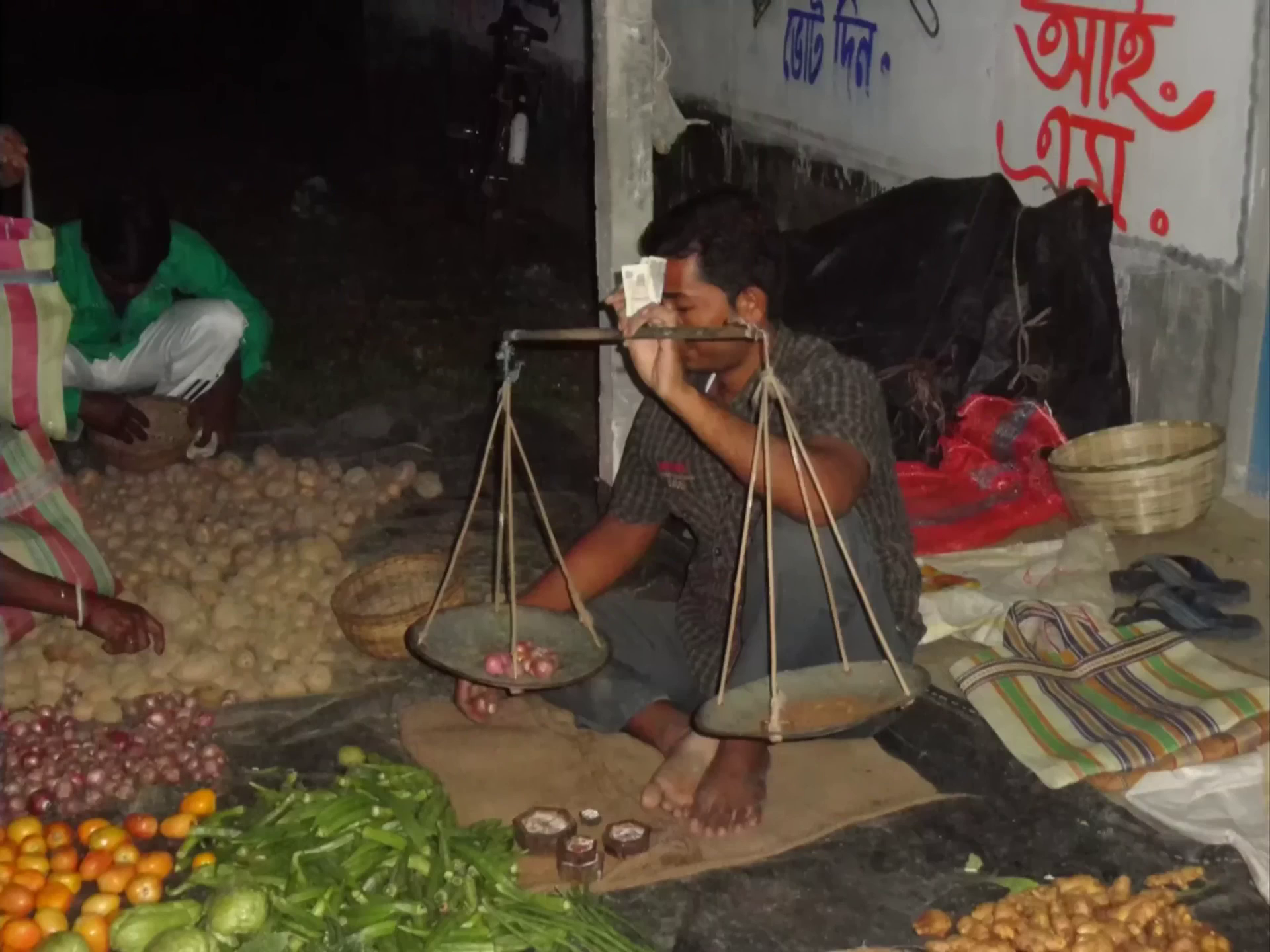
Durga Puja mela shop

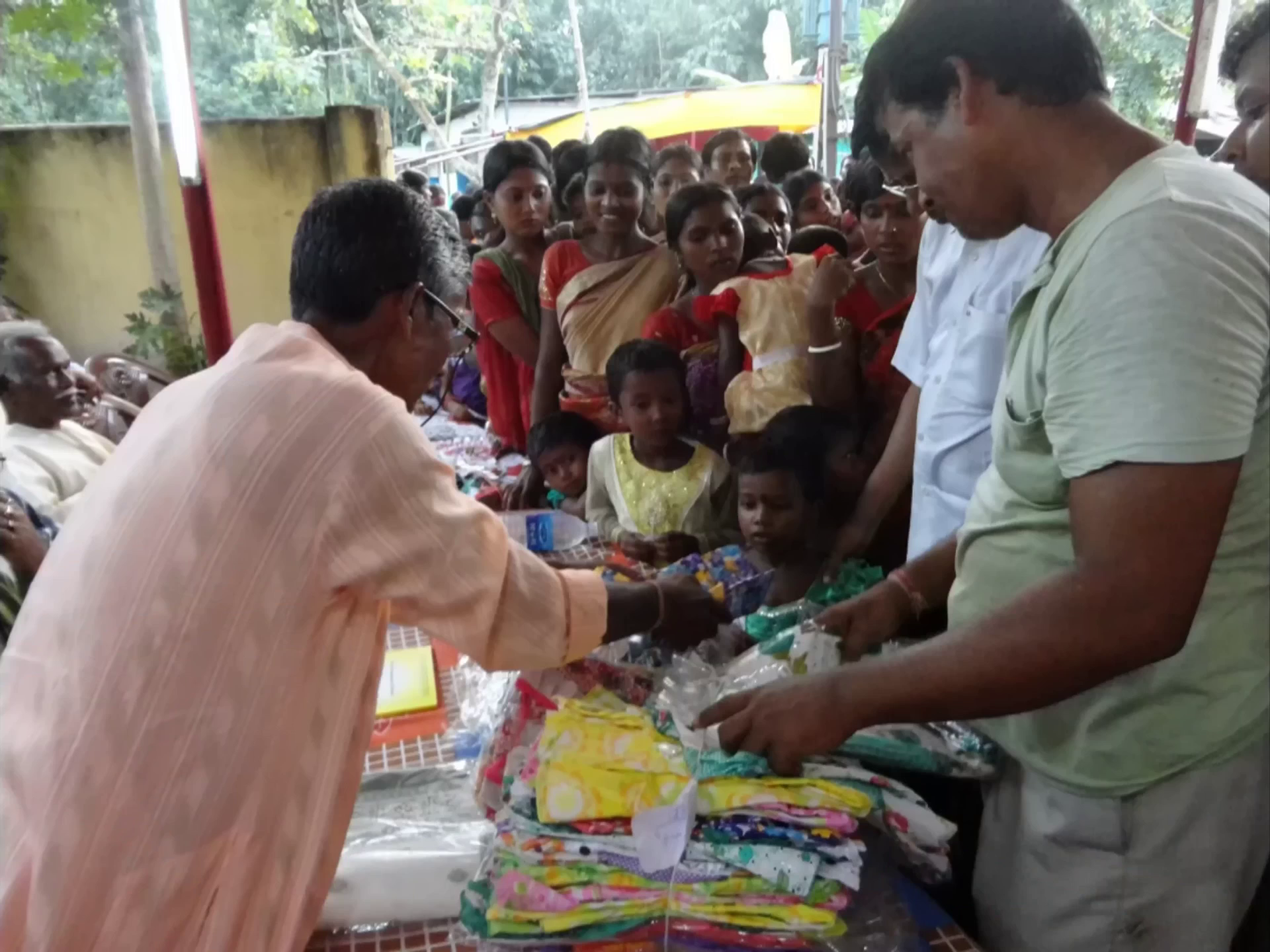
Dress Distribution at barakashipur Durga puja mandop

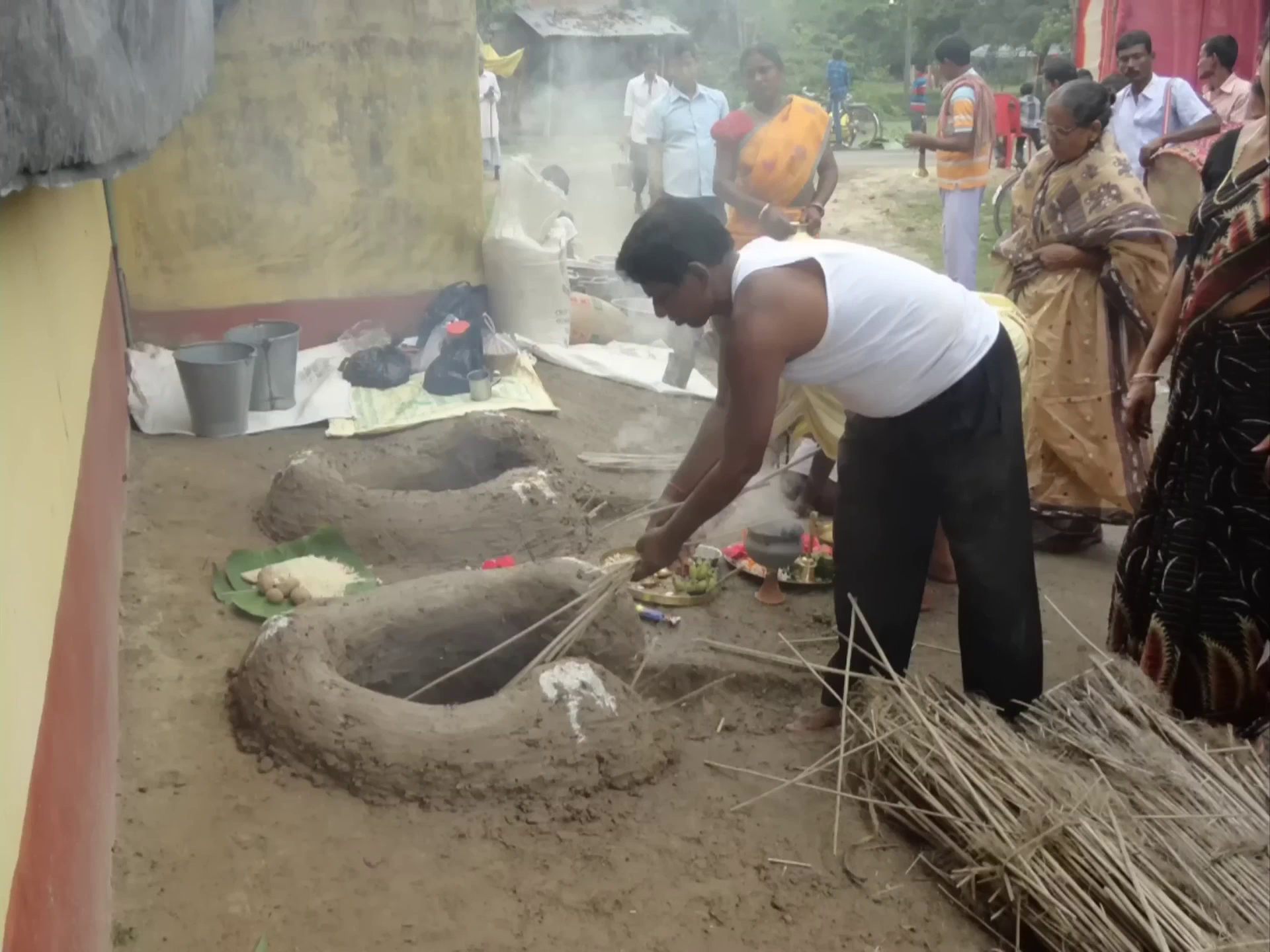
Khichuri Rana by villagers

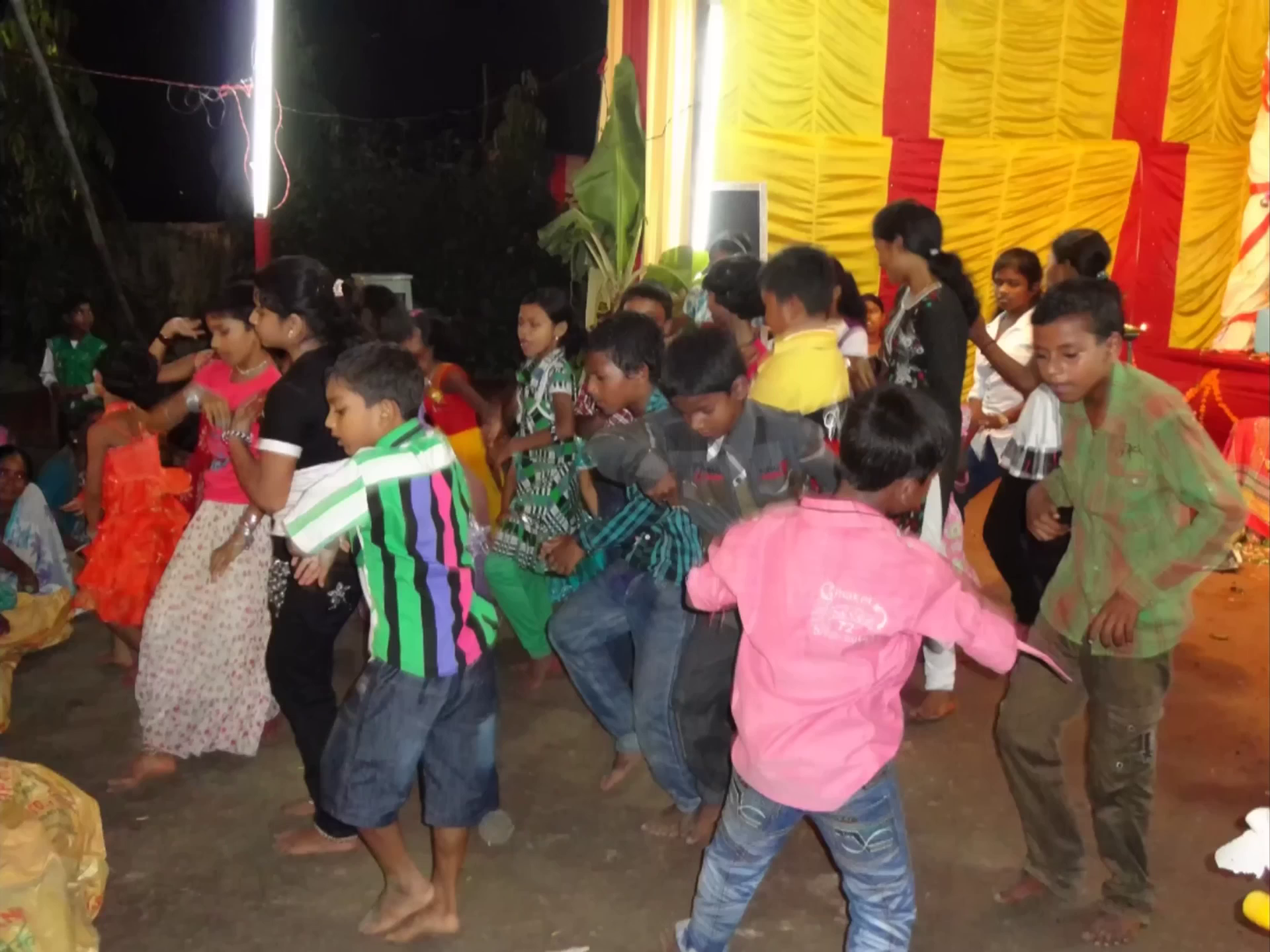
Dance, Maha Nabami

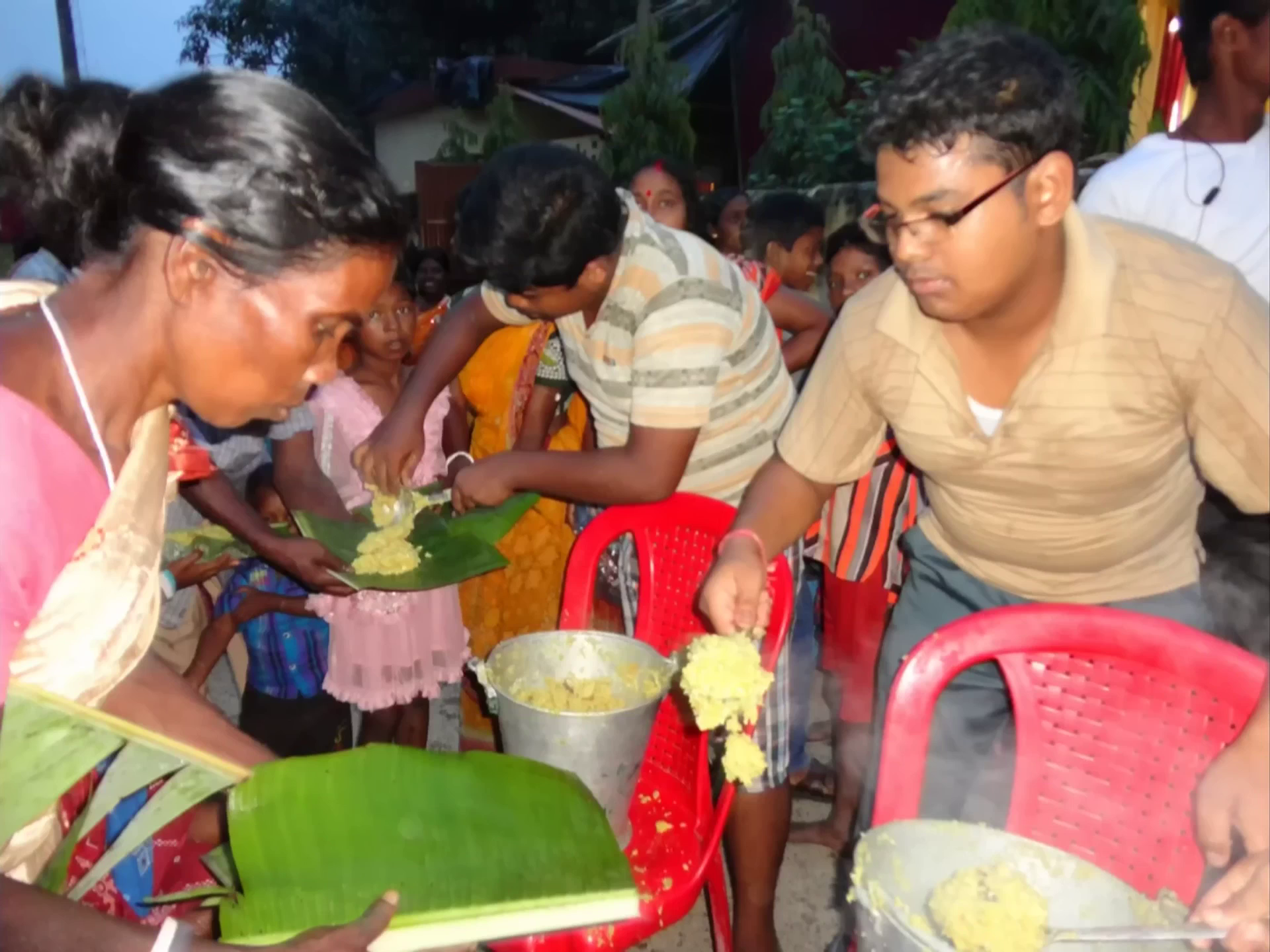
Khichuri distribution at puja mandop, 2014

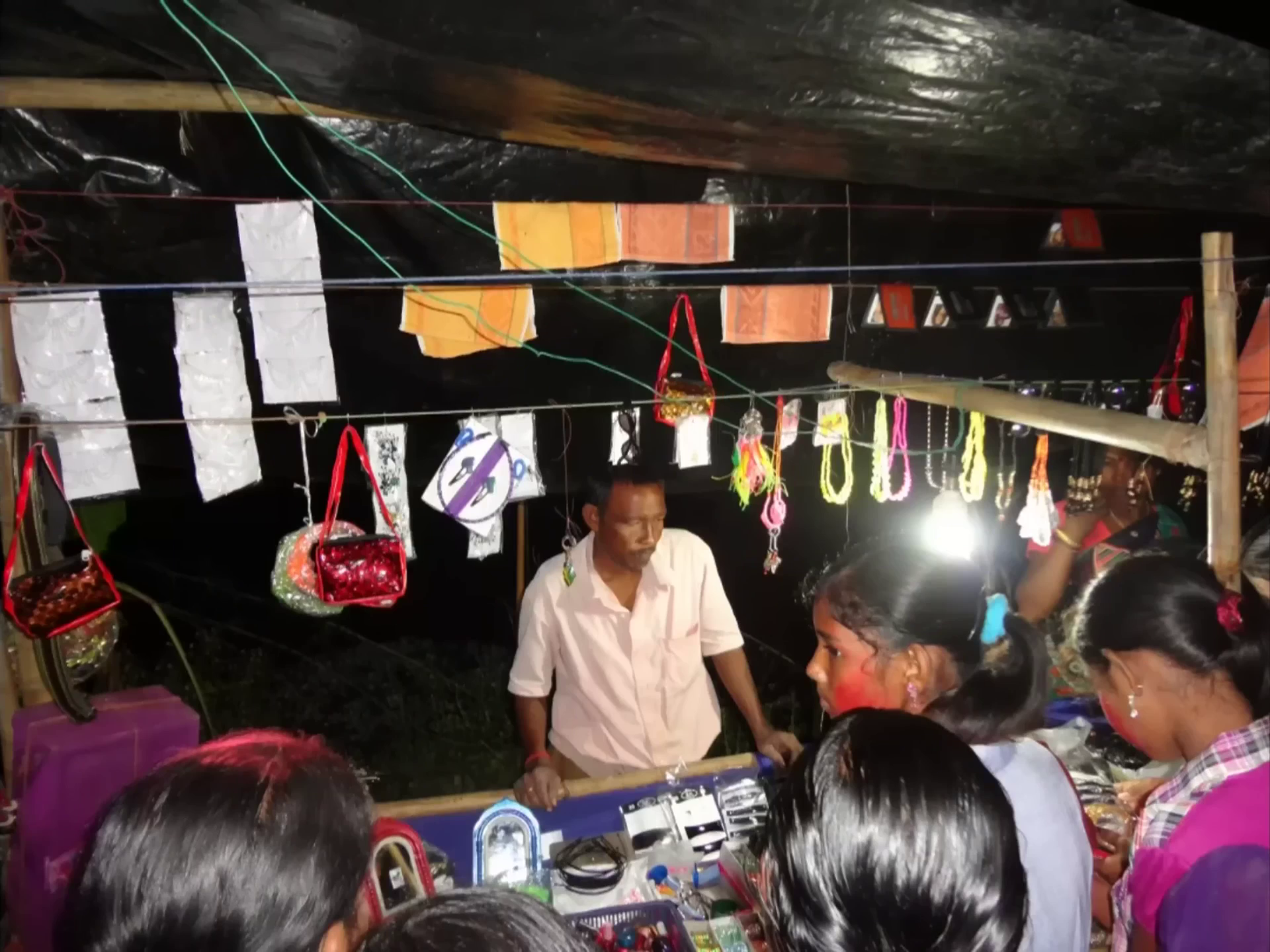
Mela Shop 2

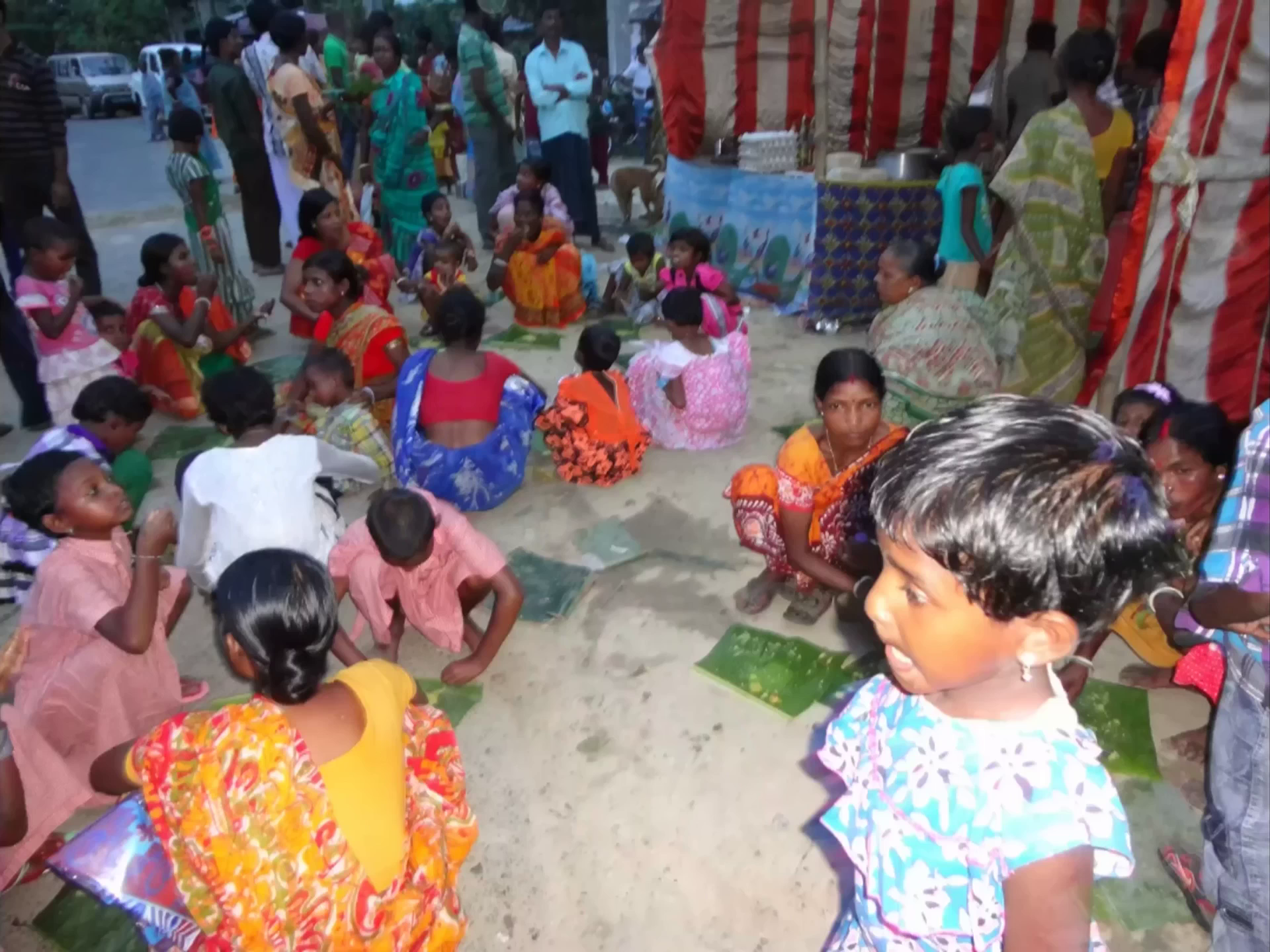
Durga Puja Khichuri vog 2013

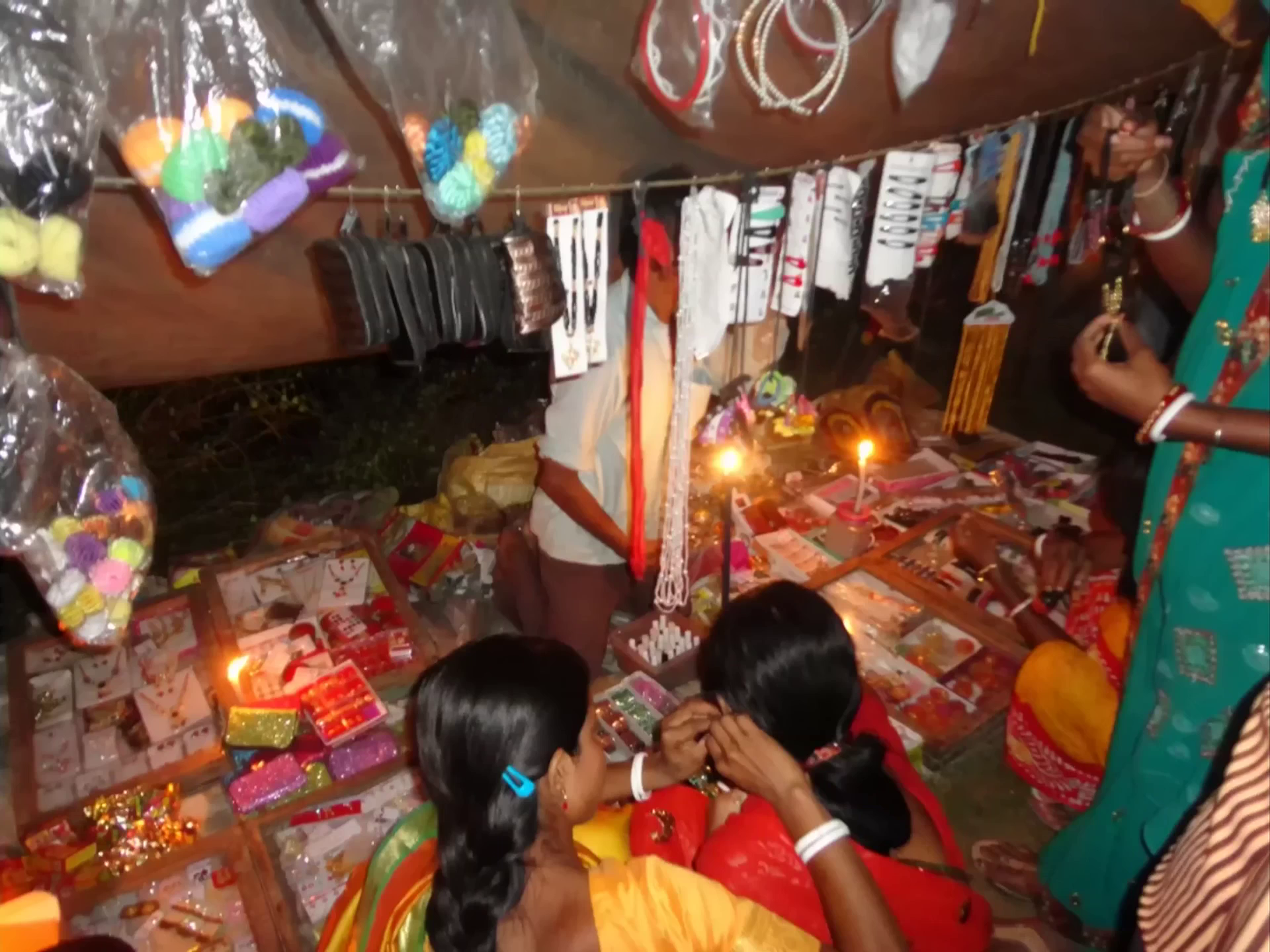
Durga Puja 2011 Mela
