= Shahr (country subdivision) =

Country subdivision of Azerbaijan and Iran

A shahr (from Persian: شهر, romanized: šahr, lit. 'city'; Azerbaijani: şəhər) is a country subdivision in Iran and the Republic of Azerbaijan.

== See also ==
- Subdivisions of Iran
- Subdivisions of Azerbaijan
