= Yeman Jeluq =

Village in Alborz province, Iran

Yeman Jeluq Persian: يمان جلوق
- Village
- Location within Iran
- Coordinates: 35°59′19″N 50°28′49″E
- Country: Iran
- Province: Alborz
- County: Nazarabad
- Rural District: Ahmadabad

Population (2006)
  - Total: 210
- Time zone: UTC+03:30 (IRST)

Yeman Jeluq (Persian: يمان جلوق) (Note: Also romanized as Yemān Jeleq and Yemān Jelūq; also known as Eslamabad, also romanized as Eslāmābād) is a village in Ahmadabad Rural District of the Central District in Nazarabad County, Alborz province, Iran.

== Demographics ==
=== Population ===
At the time of the 2006 National Census, the village's population was 210 in 41 households, when it was in Tehran province. In 2010, the county was separated from the province in the establishment of Alborz province. The village did not appear in the 2016 census.
