= Mehdiabad, Nazarabad =

Village in Alborz province, Iran

Mehdiabad Persian: مهدي آباد
- Village
- Location within Iran
- Coordinates: 35°58′51″N 50°35′47″E
- Country: Iran
- Province: Alborz
- County: Nazarabad
- Rural District: Ahmadabad

Population (2016)
  - Total: 451
- Time zone: UTC+03:30 (IRST)

Mehdiabad (Persian: مهدي آباد) is a village in Ahmadabad Rural District of the Central District in Nazarabad County, Alborz province, Iran.

== Demographics ==
=== Population ===
The village did not appear in the 2006 National Census, when it was in Tehran province. In 2010, the county was separated from the province in the establishment of Alborz province. The 2016 census measured the population of the village as 451 in 139 households.
