= Kalleh-ye Bahram =

Village in Alborz province, Iran

Kalleh-ye Bahram Persian: كله بهرام
- Village
- Location within Iran
- Coordinates: 35°59′13″N 50°29′53″E
- Country: Iran
- Province: Alborz
- County: Nazarabad
- Rural District: Ahmadabad

Population (2016)
  - Total: 80
- Time zone: UTC+03:30 (IRST)

Kalleh-ye Bahram (Persian: كله بهرام) (Note: Also romanized as Kalleh-ye Bahrām, Koleh Bahrām, Qal‘eh Bahrām, and Qal‘eh-ye Bahrām) is a village in Ahmadabad Rural District of the Central District in Nazarabad County, Alborz province, Iran.

== Demographics ==
=== Population ===
At the time of the 2006 National Census, the village's population was 71 in 12 households, when it was in Tehran province. In 2010, the county was separated from the province in the establishment of Alborz province. The 2016 census measured the population of the village as 80 in 26 households.
