= Qazvin-Azadi Airport =

- IATA: none; ICAO: OIIA

Summary
- Airport type: Public
- Owner: Government of Iran
- Operator: Iran Airports Company
- Location: Qarpuzabad, Alborz Province, Iran
- Elevation AMSL: 3,800 ft / 1,158 m
- Coordinates: 35°57′07.6″N 050°27′02.8″E

Map
- Location of airport in Iran

Runways
Direction	Length		Surface
Direction	ft	m	Surface
10/28	4,579	1,396	Asphalt
- Source: World Aero Data

Qazvin-Azadi Airport (Persian: فرودگاه آزادی) (ICAO: OIIA) is an airport located near Qazvin Province, Iran, near Qarpuzabad village.
