= Hemmatabad, Alborz =

Village in Alborz province, Iran

Hemmatabad Persian: همت‌آباد
- Village
- Location within Iran
- Coordinates: 35°58′11″N 50°34′18″E
- Country: Iran
- Province: Alborz
- County: Nazarabad
- Rural District: Ahmadabad

Population (2016)
  - Total: Below reporting threshold
- Time zone: UTC+03:30 (IRST)

Hemmatabad (Persian: همت‌آباد) (Note: Also romanized as Hemmatābād; also known as Kelāk (کلاک)) is a village in Ahmadabad Rural District of the Central District in Nazarabad County, Alborz province, Iran.

== Demographics ==
=== Population ===
At the time of the 2006 National Census, the village's population was 15 in five households, when it was in Tehran province. In 2010, the county was separated from the province in the establishment of Alborz province. The 2016 census measured the population of the village as below the reporting threshold.
