= Safar Khvajeh =

Village in Alborz province, Iran

Safar Khvajeh Persian: صفرخواجه
- Village
- Location within Iran
- Coordinates: 35°59′51″N 50°25′26″E
- Country: Iran
- Province: Alborz
- County: Nazarabad
- Rural District: Ahmadabad

Population (2016)
  - Total: 761
- Time zone: UTC+03:30 (IRST)

Safar Khvajeh (Persian: صفرخواجه) (Note: Also romanized as Şafar Khvājeh and Safar Khwājeh) is a village in Ahmadabad Rural District of the Central District in Nazarabad County, Alborz province, Iran.

== Demographics ==
=== Population ===
At the time of the 2006 National Census, the village's population was 793 in 208 households, when it was in Tehran province. In 2010, the county was separated from the province in the establishment of Alborz province. The 2016 census measured the population of the village as 761 in 244 households.
