= Hasanabad-e Majd ol Dolleh =

Village in Alborz province, Iran

Hasanabad-e Majd ol Dolleh Persian: حسن‌آباد مجدالدوله
- Village
- Location within Iran
- Coordinates: 35°58′22″N 50°32′20″E
- Country: Iran
- Province: Alborz
- County: Nazarabad
- Rural District: Ahmadabad

Population (2016)
  - Total: 68
- Time zone: UTC+03:30 (IRST)

Hasanabad-e Majd ol Dolleh (Persian: حسن‌آباد مجدالدوله) (Note: Also romanized as Ḩasanābād-e Majd-od-Dowleh and Ḩasanābād-e Majd-ol-Dowleh; also known as Ḩasanābād) is a village in Ahmadabad Rural District of the Central District in Nazarabad County, Alborz province, Iran.

== Demographics ==
=== Population ===
At the time of the 2006 National Census, the village's population was 77 in 18 households, when it was in Tehran province. In 2010, the county was separated from the province in the establishment of Alborz province. The 2016 census measured the population of the village as 68 in 19 households.
