= Gazer Sang =

Village in Alborz province, Iran

Gazer Sang Persian: گازرسنگ
- Village
- Location within Iran
- Coordinates: 35°59′57″N 50°32′15″E
- Country: Iran
- Province: Alborz
- County: Nazarabad
- Rural District: Ahmadabad

Population (2016)
  - Total: 535
- Time zone: UTC+03:30 (IRST)

Gazer Sang (Persian: گازرسنگ) (Note: Also romanized as Gāzor Sang; also known as Qāder Sang' and Qādirsang) is a village in Ahmadabad Rural District of the Central District in Nazarabad County, Alborz province, Iran.

== Demographics ==
=== Population ===
At the time of the 2006 National Census, the village's population was 512 in 136 households, when it was in Tehran province. In 2010, the county was separated from the province in the establishment of Alborz province. The 2016 census measured the population of the village as 535 in 164 households.
