= Hasan Bakul =

Village in Alborz province, Iran

Hasan Bakul Persian: حسن بكول
- Village
- Location within Iran
- Coordinates: 35°58′30″N 50°29′04″E
- Country: Iran
- Province: Alborz
- County: Nazarabad
- Rural District: Ahmadabad

Population (2016)
  - Total: 14
- Time zone: UTC+03:30 (IRST)

Hasan Bakul (Persian: حسن بكول) (Note: Also romanized as Ḩasan Bakūl) is a village in Ahmadabad Rural District of the Central District in Nazarabad County, Alborz province, Iran.

== Demographics ==
=== Population ===
At the time of the 2006 National Census, the village's population was 33 in seven households, when it was in Tehran province. In 2010, the county was separated from the province in the establishment of Alborz province. The 2016 census measured the population of the village as 14 in four households.
