= Kazemabad, Alborz =

Village in Alborz province, Iran

Kazemabad Persian: كاظم اباد
- Village
- Location within Iran
- Coordinates: 35°59′59″N 50°30′16″E
- Country: Iran
- Province: Alborz
- County: Nazarabad
- Rural District: Ahmadabad

Population (2016)
  - Total: 688
- Time zone: UTC+03:30 (IRST)

Kazemabad (Persian: كاظم اباد) (Note: Also romanized as Kāz̧emābād) is a village in Ahmadabad Rural District of the Central District in Nazarabad County, Alborz province, Iran.

== Demographics ==
=== Population ===
At the time of the 2006 National Census, the village's population was 806 in 211 households, when it was in Tehran province. In 2010, the county was separated from the province in the establishment of Alborz province. The 2016 census measured the population of the village as 688 in 189 households.
