= Azbeki =

Village in Alborz province, Iran

Azbeki Persian: ازبكي
- Village
- Country: Iran
- Province: Alborz
- County: Nazarabad
- Rural District: Ahmadabad

Population (2016)
  - Total: 83
- Time zone: UTC+03:30 (IRST)

Azbeki (Persian: ازبكي) (Note: Also romanized as Āzbeḵī) is a village in Ahmadabad Rural District of the Central District in Nazarabad County, Alborz province, Iran.

== Demographics ==
=== Population ===
At the time of the 2006 National Census, the village's population was 69 in 16 households, when it was in Tehran province. In 2010, the county was separated from the province in the establishment of Alborz province. The 2016 census measured the population of the village as 83 in 23 households.
