= Maghrurabad =

Village in Alborz province, Iran

Maghrurabad Persian: مغروراباد
- Village
- Location within Iran
- Coordinates: 35°57′54″N 50°34′52″E
- Country: Iran
- Province: Alborz
- County: Nazarabad
- Rural District: Ahmadabad

Population (2016)
  - Total: Below reporting threshold
- Time zone: UTC+03:30 (IRST)

Maghrurabad (Persian: مغروراباد) (Note: Also romanized as Maghrūrābād) is a village in Ahmadabad Rural District of the Central District in Nazarabad County, Alborz province, Iran.

== Demographics ==
=== Population ===
At the time of the 2006 National Census, the village's population was 29 in five households, when it was in Tehran province. In 2010, the county was separated from the province in the establishment of Alborz province. The 2016 census measured the population of the village as below the reporting threshold.
