= Rezaabad, Alborz =

Village in Alborz province, Iran

Rezaabad Persian: رضااباد
- Village
- Location within Iran
- Coordinates: 35°57′37″N 50°32′26″E
- Country: Iran
- Province: Alborz
- County: Nazarabad
- Rural District: Ahmadabad

Population (2016)
  - Total: 38
- Time zone: UTC+03:30 (IRST)

Rezaabad (Persian: رضااباد) (Note: Also romanized as Reẕāābād) is a village in Ahmadabad Rural District of the Central District in Nazarabad County, Alborz province, Iran.

== Demographics ==
=== Population ===
At the time of the 2006 National Census, the village's population was 25 in eight households, when it was in Tehran province. In 2010, the county was separated from the province in the establishment of Alborz province. The 2016 census measured the population of the village as 38 in 10 households.
