= Ahmadabad-e Mosaddeq =

Village in Alborz province, Iran

Ahmadabad-e Mosaddeq Persian: احمداباد مصدق
- Village
- Location within Iran
- Coordinates: 35°59′37″N 50°28′29″E
- Country: Iran
- Province: Alborz
- County: Nazarabad
- Rural District: Ahmadabad

Population (2016)
  - Total: 1,603
- Time zone: UTC+03:30 (IRST)

Ahmadabad-e Mosaddeq (Persian: احمداباد مصدق) (Note: Also romanized as Aḩmadābād-e Moşaddeq; also known as Aḩmadābād and Aḩmadābād-e Kāshānī) is a village in, and the capital of, Ahmadabad Rural District in the Central District of Nazarabad County, Alborz province, Iran, 7.5 km southwest of Abyek. Mohammad Mosaddegh, former Prime Minister of Iran, is buried in Ahmadabad-e Mosaddeq.

== Demographics ==
=== Population ===
At the time of the 2006 National Census, the village's population was 1,401 in 358 households, when it was in Tehran province. In 2010, the county was separated from the province in the establishment of Alborz province. The 2016 census measured the population of the village as 1,603 in 507 households. Ahmadabad-e Mosaddeq was the most populous village in its rural district.

== Notable people ==
The Iranian politician Mohammad Mosaddegh spent his days of exile in his estates and is buried under his dining room. The compound has been subjected to serious deterioration, due to newly imposed government restrictions.

There was previously a high school named after Mossadegh, called Mossadegh High School, by popular vote during the Iranian Revolution in the late 1970s. However, it was renamed following the denunciations made against Mossadegh by Ayatollah Khomeini. The place now stands as Emam Khomeini High School.
