= Chegini, Alborz =

Village in Alborz province, Iran

Chegini Persian: چگيني
- Village
- Location within Iran
- Coordinates: 35°59′29″N 50°31′59″E
- Country: Iran
- Province: Alborz
- County: Nazarabad
- Rural District: Ahmadabad

Population (2016)
  - Total: 88
- Time zone: UTC+03:30 (IRST)

Chegini (Persian: چگيني) (Note: Also romanized as Chegīnī; also known as Jalīlābād) is a village in Ahmadabad Rural District of the Central District in Nazarabad County, Alborz province, Iran.

== Demographics ==
=== Population ===
At the time of the 2006 National Census, the village's population was 39 in 10 households, when it was in Tehran province. In 2010, the county was separated from the province in the establishment of Alborz province. The 2016 census measured the population of the village as 88 in 27 households.
