= Salehiyeh, Alborz =

Village in Alborz province, Iran

Salehiyeh Persian: صالحیه
- Village
- Location within Iran
- Coordinates: 35°57′50″N 50°26′26″E
- Country: Iran
- Province: Alborz
- County: Nazarabad
- Rural District: Ahmadabad

Population (2016)
  - Total: 1,530
- Time zone: UTC+03:30 (IRST)

Salehiyeh (Persian: صالحیه) (Note: Also romanized as Şāleḩīyeh; formerly known as Qarpuzabad (قارپوزاباد), also romanized as Qārpūzābād; also known as Ghārpūzābād and Qārpozābād) is a village in Ahmadabad Rural District of the Central District in Nazarabad County, Alborz province, Iran.

== Demographics ==
=== Population ===
At the time of the 2006 National Census, the village's population (as Qarpuzabad) was 1,567 in 412 households, when it was in Tehran province. The name of the village was changed to Salehiyeh in 2009. In 2010, the county was separated from the province in the establishment of Alborz province. The 2016 census measured the population of the village as 1,530 in 492 households.
