= Ahmadabad Rural District (Nazarabad County) =

Rural district in Alborz province, Iran

Ahmadabad Rural District Persian: دهستان احمدآباد
- Rural District
- Location within Iran
- Coordinates: 35°55′N 50°28′E
- Country: Iran
- Province: Alborz
- County: Nazarabad
- District: Central
- Established: 1987
- Capital: Ahmadabad-e Mosaddeq

Population (2016)
  - Total: 6,053
- Time zone: UTC+3:30 (IRST)

Ahmadabad Rural District (Persian: دهستان احمدآباد) is in the Central District of Nazarabad County, Alborz province, Iran. Its capital is the village of Ahmadabad-e Mosaddeq.

== Demographics ==
=== Population ===
At the time of the 2006 National Census, the rural district's population (as a part of Tehran province) was 5,792 in 1,477 households. In 2010, the county was separated from the province in the establishment of Alborz province. The 2016 census measured the population of the rural district as 6,053 in 1,877 households. The most populous of its 22 villages was Ahmadabad-e Mosaddeq, with 1,603 people.

=== Other villages in the rural district ===
- Azbeki
- Chegini
- Gazer Sang
- Hasan Bakul
- Hasanabad-e Majd ol Dolleh
- Hemmatabad
- Kalleh-ye Bahram
- Kazemabad
- Maghrurabad
- Mehdiabad
- Qaleh-ye Sheykh
- Rezaabad
- Salehiyeh
- Safar Khvajeh
- Sherkat-e Darafshan
- Yeman Jeluq
