= Administrative divisions of Iran =

The administrative divisions of Iran are arranged in four levels, the first level of which is the province (Persian: استان‌: ostān). Provinces are divided into counties (شهرستان: shahrestān); counties are divided into districts (بخش: bakhsh); and districts are divided into rural districts (دهستان: dehestān) and cities (شهر: shahr). Rural districts contain villages and other population points. One of the cities of the county is appointed as the capital (مرکز: markaz, or center) of the county.

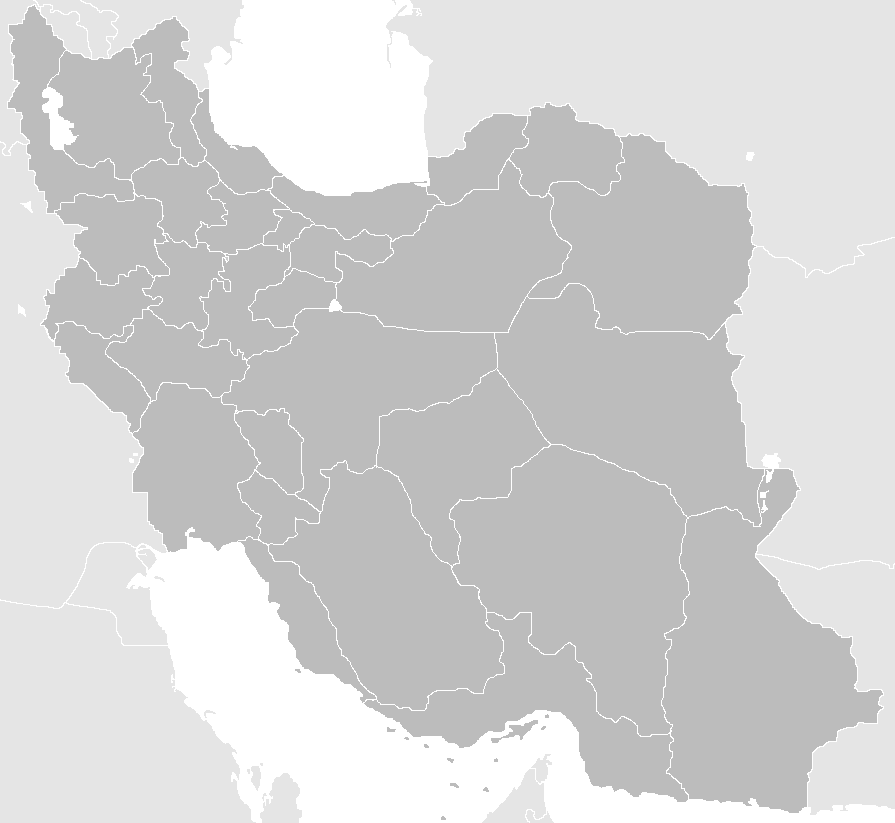
Map of Iran's provinces

According to the Statistical Center of Iran, the figures are as follows, as of March 2016 (end of Iranian calendar 1394):

English	Persian singular	Persian plural	Number
Provinces	استان ostān	استان‌ها ostānhā	31
Counties	شهرستان shahrestān	شهرستانها shahrestānhā	429
Districts	بخش bakhsh	بخشها bakhshhā	1057
Rural Districts	دهستان dehestān	دهستانها dehestānhā	2589
Cities	شهر shahr	شهرها shahrhā	1245

== Guide ==
Map of Provinces, Capitals, and Counties of Iran

The total population of a province is the total of its counties.

The total population of a county is the total of its districts.

The total population of a district is the total of its cities and rural districts.

To better understand these subdivisions, the following table for Sepidan County in Fars province (as it existed in 2006) is an example showing the hierarchy of a county's divisions:

Sepidan County (2006)
Administrative division	Pop.
Central District	24,059
Khafri Rural District	4,035
Komehr Rural District	3,812
Ardakan (city)	16,212
Beyza District (Note: Transferred to Beyza County after the 2016 census)	36,694
Banesh Rural District	9,718
Beyza Rural District	13,761
Kushk-e Hezar Rural District	9,622
Beyza (city)	3,593
Hamaijan District	27,048
Hamaijan Rural District	15,449
Shesh Pir Rural District	8,197
Sornabad Rural District	3,402
Total	87,801

Administrative divisions of Iran in 1956

== See also ==
- -stan
- -abad
