= Meshkin =

Meshkin, Moshkin, or Mushkin (Persian: مشكين); or Meshgin, Moshgin, or Mushgin (مشگين), may refer to:

== Alborz province ==
- Meshkin Dasht District, an administrative division of Fardis County
- Meshkinabad Rural District, an administrative division of Fardis County
- Meshkin Dasht, a city in Fardis County

== Ardabil province ==
- Meshgin Shahr County, an administrative division
- Meshgin-e Sharqi District, an administrative division of Meshgin Shahr County
- Meshgin-e Gharbi Rural District, an administrative division of Meshgin Shahr County
- Meshgin-e Sharqi Rural District, an administrative division of Meshgin Shahr County
- Meshginshahr, a city in Meshgin Shahr County
- Meshkin Shahr, an alternate name for Meshginshahr

== East Azerbaijan province ==
- Meshgin Jiq, a village in Bostanabad County

== Qazvin province ==
- Meshkin Tappeh, a village in Buin Zahra County
- Zakan, Qazvin, a village in Qazvin County whose alternative name is Meshkin Deh
- Meshkin Deh an alternate name for Zakan, Qazvin County
- Meshkin, Qazvin, a village in Takestan County

== Zanjan province ==
- Meshkin, Zanjan, a village in Zanjan County
