= Farrokhabad, Alborz =

Village in Alborz province, Iran

Farrokhabad Persian: فرخ اباد
- Village
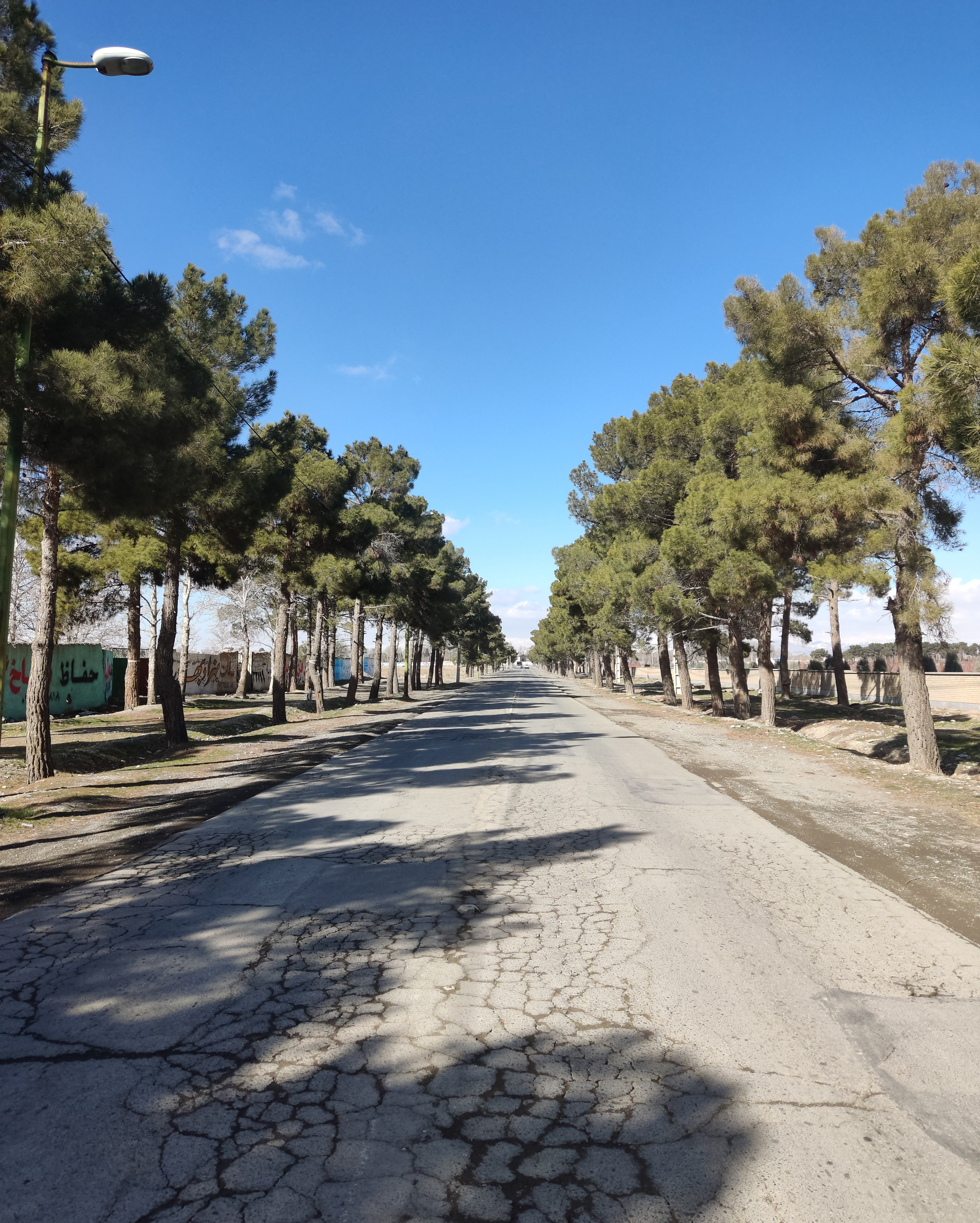

- Location within Iran
- Coordinates: 35°42′53″N 50°54′45″E
- Country: Iran
- Province: Alborz
- County: Fardis
- District: Meshkin Dasht
- Rural District: Farrokhabad

Population (2016)
  - Total: 5,407
- Time zone: UTC+3:30 (IRST)

Farrokhabad (Persian: فرخ اباد) (Note: Also romanized as Farrokhābād; also known as Farrukhābād) a village in, and the capital of, Farrokhabad Rural District in Meshkin Dasht District of Fardis County, Alborz province, Iran.

== Demographics ==
=== Population ===
At the time of the 2006 National Census, the village's population was 6,383, in 1,593 households, when it was in Mohammadabad Rural District of the Central District in Karaj County, Tehran province. In 2010, the county was separated from the province in the establishment of Alborz province. In 2013, the village was separated from the county in establishing Fardis County and was transferred to Farrokhabad Rural District created in the new Meshkin Dasht District. The 2016 census measured the population of Farrokhabad as 5,407 people in 1,675 households, the only village in its rural district at the time.
