= Sarhadabad, Alborz =

Village in Alborz province, Iran

Sarhadabad Persian: سرحدآباد
- Village
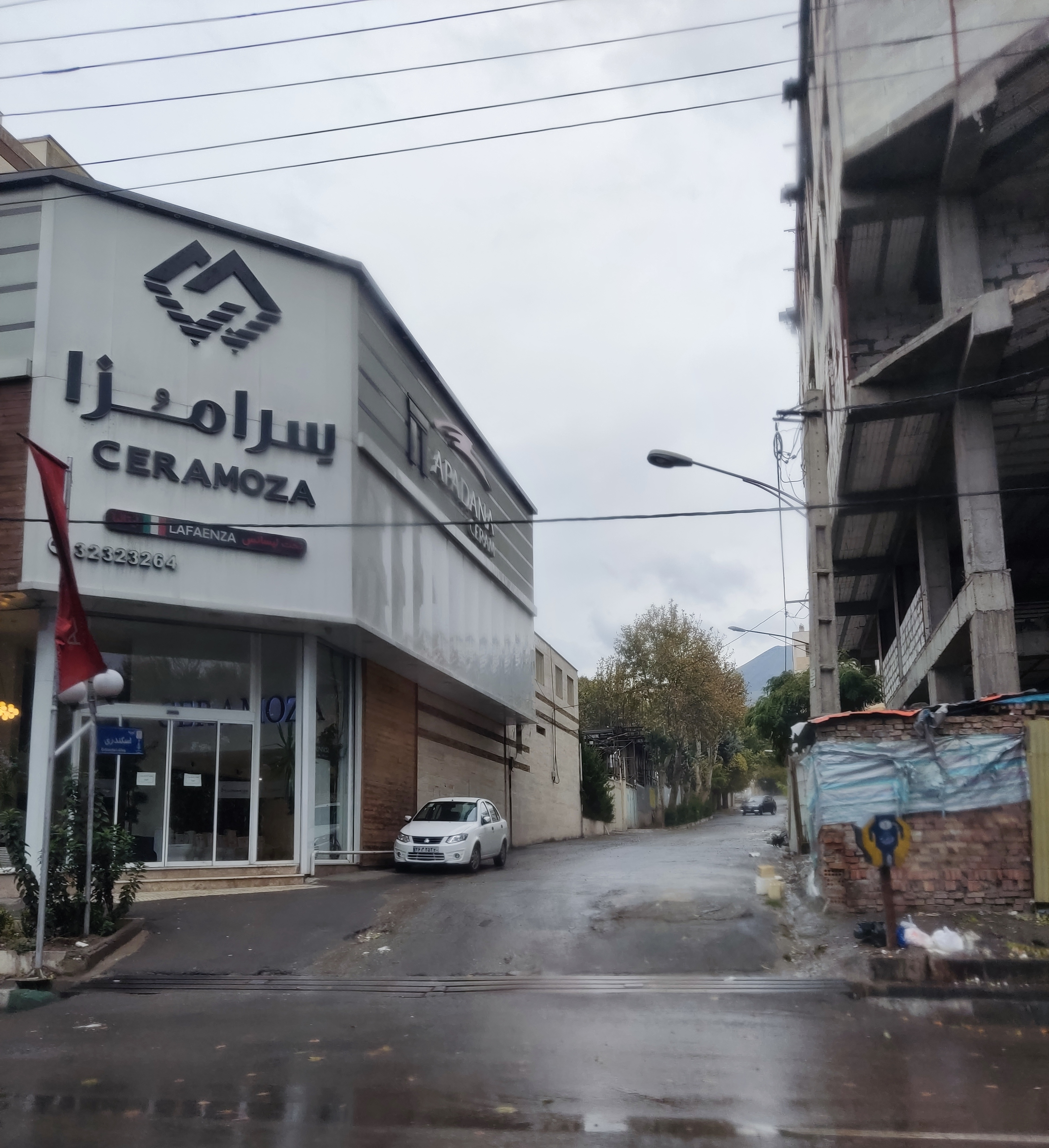
- Sarhadabad

- Location within Iran
- Coordinates: 35°45′59″N 51°00′42″E
- Country: Iran
- Province: Alborz
- County: Fardis
- District: Central
- Rural District: Vahdat

Population (2016)
  - Total: 3,617
- Time zone: UTC+3:30 (IRST)

Sarhadabad (Persian: سرحدآباد) is a village in Vahdat Rural District of the Central District in Fardis County, Alborz province, Iran.

== History ==
In 2010, Karaj County was separated from Tehran province in the establishment of Alborz province.

In 2013, the city of Meshkin Dasht, the Fardis neighborhood (Note: Became the city of Fardis) in the city of Karaj, and other parts of the county were separated from it in establishing Fardis County. Vahdat Rural District was created in the new Central District.

== Demographics ==
=== Population ===
At the time of the 2016 National Census, the village's population was 3,617 people in 1,157 households. It was the only village in its rural district.
