= Shahrak-e Mohandesi-ye Zerai =

Village in Alborz province, Iran

Shahrak-e Mohandesi-ye Zerai Persian: شهرک مهندسی زراعی
- Village
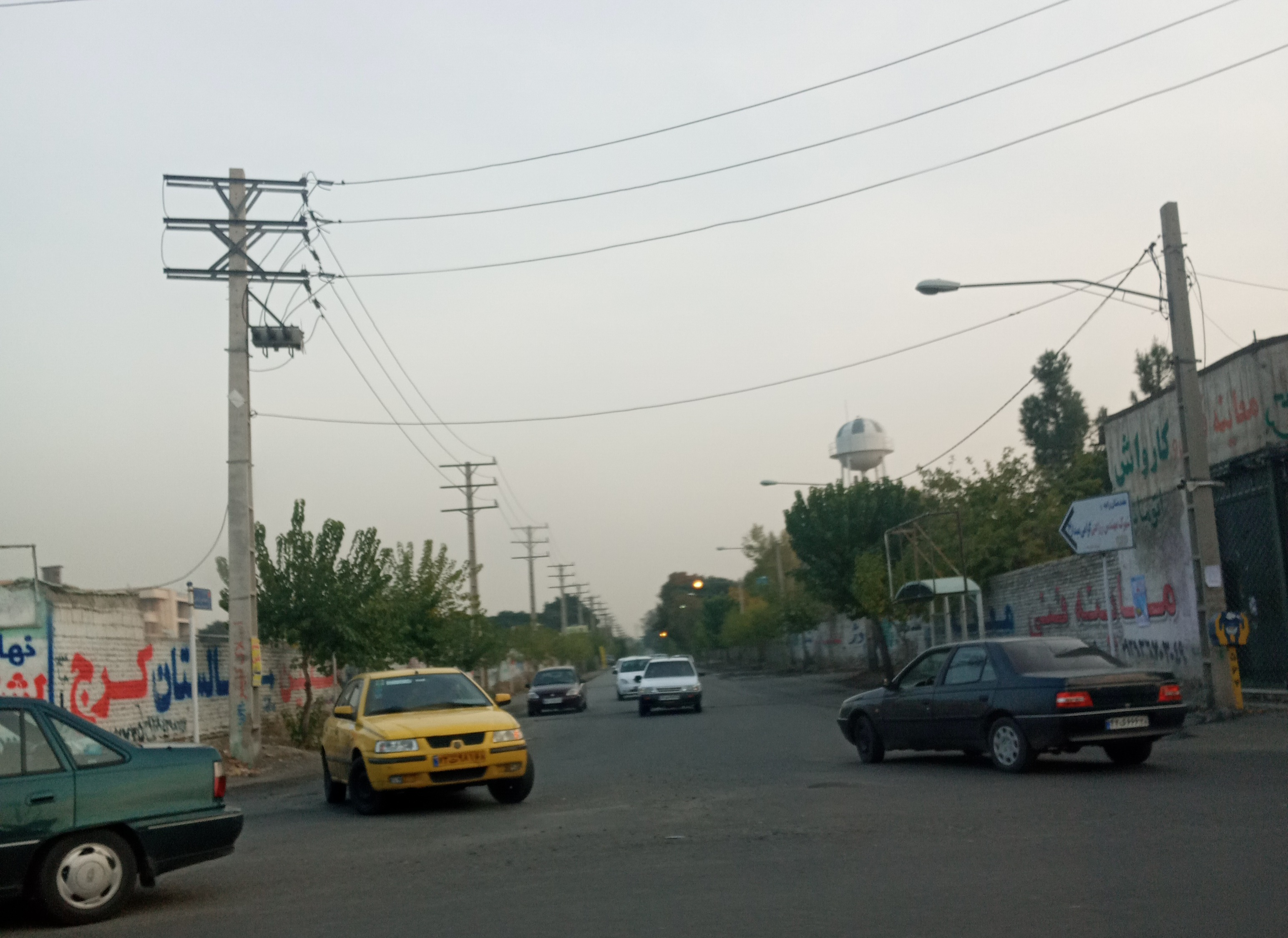

- Location within Iran
- Coordinates: 35°46′19″N 50°57′20″E
- Country: Iran
- Province: Alborz
- County: Fardis
- District: Meshkin Dasht
- Rural District: Meshkinabad

Population (2016)
  - Total: 16,104
- Time zone: UTC+3:30 (IRST)

Shahrak-e Mohandesi-ye Zerai (Persian: شهرک مهندسی زراعی) (Note: Also romanized as Shahrak-e Mohandesī-ye Zerā‘ī; English: Agricultural Engineering Town) is a village in, and the capital of, Meshkinabad Rural District in Meshkin Dasht District of Fardis County, Alborz province, Iran.

== Demographics ==
=== Population ===
At the time of the 2006 National Census, the village's population was 4,276 in 1,181 households, when it was in Mohammadabad Rural District of the Central District in Karaj County, Tehran province. In 2010, the county was separated from the province in the establishment of Alborz province. In 2013, the village was separated from the county in establishing Fardis County, and was transferred to Meshkinabad Rural District created in the new Meshkin Dasht District. The 2016 census measured the population of the village as 16,104 people in 5,120 households. Shahrak-e Mohandesi-ye Zerai was the most populous village in its rural district.
