= Soil Fertility Centre =

Village in Alborz province, Iran

Soil Fertility Centre Persian: مرکز خاکشناسی و حاصلخیزی خاک
- Village
- Location within Iran
- Coordinates: 35°45′21″N 50°57′26″E
- Country: Iran
- Province: Alborz
- County: Fardis
- District: Meshkin Dasht
- Rural District: Meshkinabad

Population (2016)
  - Total: 57
- Time zone: UTC+3:30 (IRST)

Soil Fertility Centre (Persian: مرکز خاکشناسی و حاصلخیزی خاک) (Note: Transliterated as Marḵaz Khāḵshenāsī va Hāṣlekhīzī Khāḵ) is a village in Meshkinabad Rural District of Meshkin Dasht District in Fardis County, Alborz province, Iran.

== Demographics ==
=== Population ===
At the time of the 2006 National Census, the village's population was 45 in 21 households, when it was in Mohammadabad Rural District of the Central District in Karaj County, Tehran province. In 2010, the county was separated from the province in the establishment of Alborz province. In 2013, the village was separated from the county in establishing Fardis County, and was transferred to Meshkinabad Rural District created in the new Meshkin Dasht District. The 2016 census measured the population of the village as 57 people in 26 households.
