= Sepiddasht, Alborz =

Village in Alborz province, Iran

Sepiddasht Persian: سپيددشت
- Village
- Location within Iran
- Country: Iran
- Province: Alborz
- County: Fardis
- District: Central
- Rural District: Fardis

Population (2016)
  - Total: 3,338
- Time zone: UTC+3:30 (IRST)

Sepiddasht (Persian: سپيددشت) (Note: Also romanized as Sepīddasht; also known as Sefīddasht) is a village in Fardis Rural District of the Central District in Fardis County, Alborz province, Iran.

== Demographics ==
=== Population ===
At the time of the 2006 National Census, the village's population was 1,418 in 375 households, when it was in Mohammadabad Rural District of the Central District in Karaj County, Tehran province. In 2010, the county was separated from the province in the establishment of Alborz province. In 2013, the village was separated from the county in establishing Fardis County and transferred to Fardis Rural District created in the new Central District. The 2016 census measured the population of Sepiddasht as 3,338 people in 1,019 households, the only village in its rural district at the time.
