= Garmdarreh (disambiguation) =

Garmdarreh is a city in Alborz province, Iran.

Garmdarreh (also spelled Garm Darreh) (Persian: گرم دره) may also refer to:

- Garmdarreh Rural District, an administrative division of Karaj County, Alborz province
- Garmdarreh, Chaharmahal and Bakhtiari, a village in Saman County, Chaharmahal and Bakhtiari province
- Garm Darreh, West Azerbaijan, a village in Khoy County, West Azerbaijan province
