= Omid Barak =

Iranian serial killer (1986–2011)

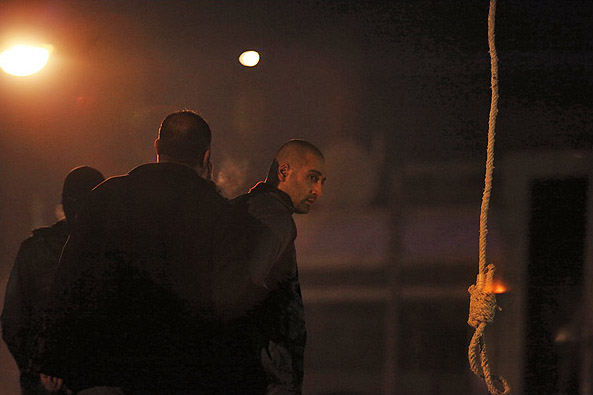
- Barak on the way to his execution
- Born: 1986; Qazvin, Iran
- Died: 7 February 2011 (aged 24–25); Quds Square, Karaj, Iran
- Cause of death: Execution by hanging
- Other name: "The Highway Killer"
- Convictions: Murder × 10; Adultery ×8; Rape ×2; Receiving stolen property
- Penalty: Death (murders); 5 years (receiving stolen property)

Details
- Victims: 10
- Span of crimes: 2006–2008
- Country: Iran
- States: Gilan, Alborz
- Date apprehended: 10 July 2008

Omid Barak (1986 – 7 February 2011), known as The Highway Killer (Persian: قاتل بزرگراه), was an Iranian serial killer who strangled ten women from 2006 to 2008. Most of his killings occurred in the city of Karaj and the surrounding areas.

Barak was tried, convicted, and sentenced to death for the killings, and was subsequently executed in 2011.

== Early life ==
Barak was born in 1986 in Qazvin. He was one of four children born to a labourer and a nurse's aide. According to later interviews, Barak claimed that his parents fought so often that they rarely paid attention to either him or his siblings.

Due to the family's difficult financial situation, Barak dropped out of school at age 13 and lived on the streets for the following five years before being drafted into the Army. After serving two years, he quit and moved to Astaneh-ye Ashrafiyeh, where he found a job as a labourer.

In 2005, Barak married a local woman. He would eventually start working as a taxi driver. He was arrested after a woman accused him of attempted kidnapping.

== Murders ==
The first two murders occurred in the cities of Langarud and Astaneh-ye Ashrafiyeh in 2006, after which Barak and his wife moved to Karaj. For the first several months of his residence there, he decided to attempt to live a normal life for the sake of his wife, but eventually returned to his old habits because killing made him "feel calm".

In February 2008, the body of a 35-year-old woman was discovered near a highway in Kamal Shahr. A police unit was quickly dispatched to the crime scene, with one of the investigators determining that she had been strangled with a cloth, likely at another location, before being dumped at the crime scene. About a month later, the body of another woman was found in similar circumstances, followed by a third victim in April, who was found strangled with her own headscarf near Qezel Hesar. The belief that a serial killer was operating in the area was cemented with the discovery of a fourth victim in May, with an autopsy determining that she had suffocated to death.

On 29 June, the body of the fifth victim was found near the Payam International Airport in Karaj, with criminal investigators again determining that she had likely been killed at another location. About two days later, authorities found the body of a 24-year-old woman in Kamal Shahr, who had recently been declared missing after failing to return home from shopping. Like the previous victims, she had been strangled with her own headscarf. Just a few days later, the body of yet another victim was found on an isolated road near Qezel Hesar.

== Arrest, trial and execution ==
After examining the latest victim's phone calls, police traced a call to a young man named Omid, eventually identifying Omid Barak as the prime suspect in the killings. Apparently realizing that they were onto him, Barak fled to another city but was arrested on 10 July 2008. After being extradited back to Karaj, he confessed to all of the murders in subsequent interrogations. His wife was also arrested as an accomplice and was accused of aiding and abetting in at least six of the cases. In response, Barak repeatedly said that she had only helped in selling the victims' stolen items.

During the trial, Barak entered an insanity plea, claiming that he was under the effects of neuroleptics at the time of the crimes. The results of a psychiatric examination disproved these claims, however, and he was subsequently convicted on ten counts of murder, eight counts of adultery, and two counts of rape. He would later be convicted for aiding and abetting and for receiving stolen property, for which he was given a 5-year prison term and 74 lashes.

While awaiting execution, Barak was interviewed by several journalists about his crimes, during which he continued to proclaim that he had acted out of his own accord and gave accurate details of each crime scene. However, days prior to his execution, he suddenly changed his stance and said that he had only moved the bodies, pinning all of the killings on his wife with the excuse that he was only trying to protect her. His explanations were not believed, and on 7 February 2011, he was publicly hanged in Karaj's Quds Square. As the execution was carried out early in the morning and no notice was handed out, it was only attended by the two security guards who performed the hanging. Reportedly, Barak showed no visible emotion during the procedure and was described as calm.

He was one among several convicts to be executed across the country on this date, including a trio of child rapists in Evin.

== See also ==
- List of serial killers by country
