= Farrokhabad Rural District =

Rural district in Alborz province, Iran

Farrokhabad Rural District Persian: دهستان فرخ‌آباد
- Rural District
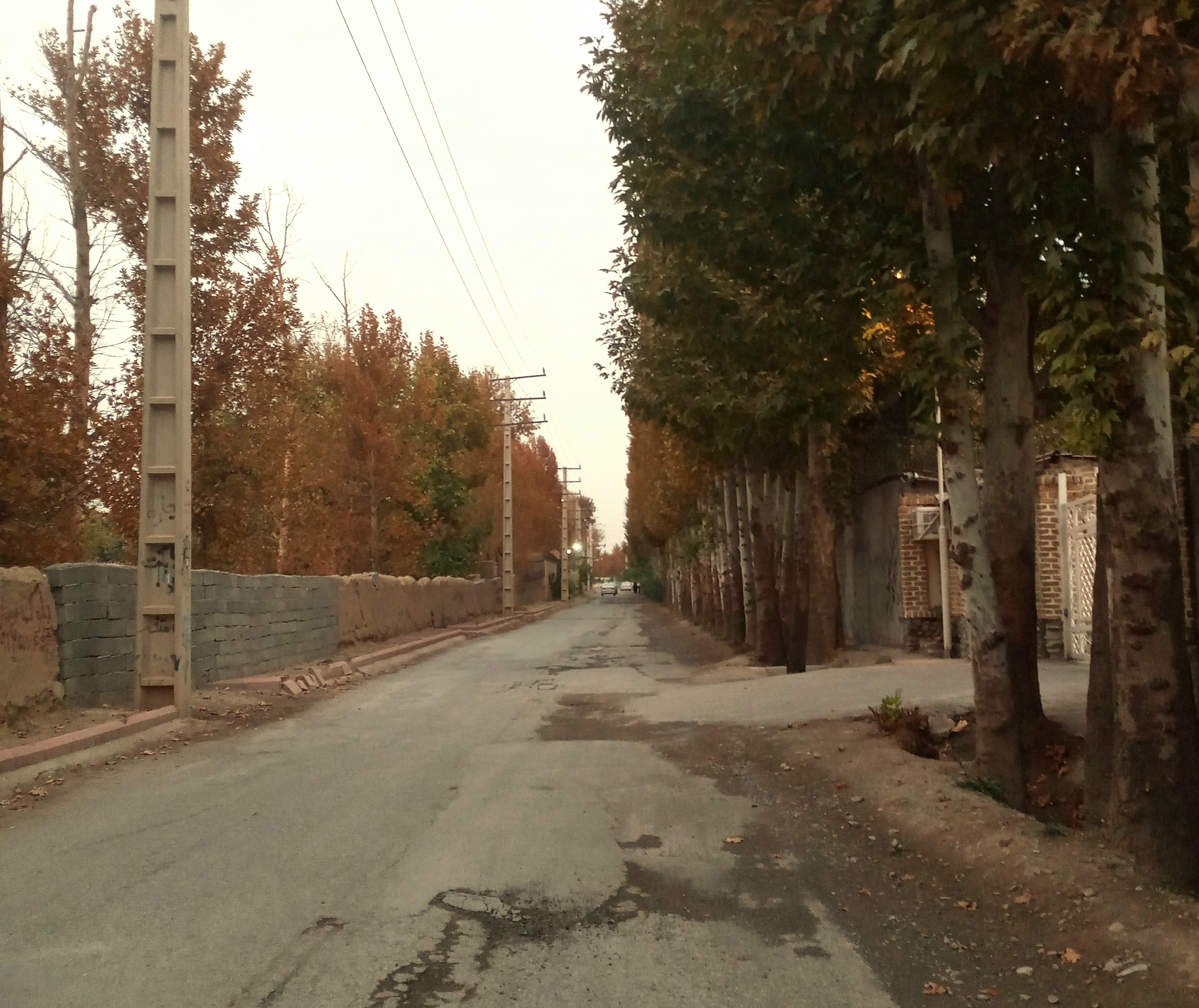

- Location within Iran
- Coordinates: 35°43′N 50°55′E
- Country: Iran
- Province: Alborz
- County: Fardis
- District: Meshkin Dasht
- Established: 2013
- Capital: Farrokhabad

Population (2016)
  - Total: 5,407
- Time zone: UTC+3:30 (IRST)

Farrokhabad Rural District (Persian: دهستان فرخ‌آباد) is in Meshkin Dasht District of Fardis County, Alborz province, Iran. Its capital is the village of Farrokhabad.

== History ==
In 2010, Karaj County was separated from Tehran province in the establishment of Alborz province.

In 2013, the city of Meshkin Dasht, the Fardis neighborhood (Note: Became the city of Fardis) in the city of Karaj, and other parts of the county were separated from it in establishing Fardis County. Farrokhabad Rural District was created in the new Meshkin Dasht District.

== Demographics ==
=== Population ===
At the time of the 2016 National Census, the rural district's population was 5,407 in 1,675 households. Its only village was Farrokhabad, with 5,407 people.
