= Fardis Rural District =

Rural district in Alborz province, Iran

Fardis Rural District Persian: دهستان فردیس
- Rural District
- Location within Iran
- Coordinates: 35°45′N 50°59′E
- Country: Iran
- Province: Alborz
- County: Fardis
- District: Central
- Established: 2013
- Capital: Shahrak-e Naz

Population (2016)
  - Total: 3,338
- Time zone: UTC+3:30 (IRST)

Fardis Rural District (Persian: دهستان فردیس) is in the Central District of Fardis County, Alborz province, Iran. Its capital is the neighborhood of Shahrak-e Naz.

== History ==
In 2010, Karaj County was separated from Tehran province in the establishment of Alborz province.

In 2013, the city of Meshkin Dasht, the Fardis neighborhood (Note: Became the city of Fardis) in the city of Karaj, and other parts of the county were separated from it in establishing Fardis County. Fardis Rural District was created in the new Central District.

== Demographics ==
=== Population ===
At the time of the 2016 National Census, the rural district's population was 3,338 in 1,019 households. Its only village was Sepiddasht, with 3,338 people.
