= Khvares =

Village in Alborz province, Iran

Khvares Persian: خوارس
- Village
- Location within Iran
- Coordinates: 35°57′41″N 51°00′03″E
- Country: Iran
- Province: Alborz
- County: Karaj
- District: Central
- Rural District: Kamalabad

Population (2016)
  - Total: 6
- Time zone: UTC+3:30 (IRST)

Khvares (Persian: خوارس) (Note: Also romanized as Khovārs, Khūvāres, and Khvāres) is a village in Kamalabad Rural District of the Central District in Karaj County, Alborz province, Iran.

== Demographics ==
=== Population ===
At the time of the 2006 National Census, the village's population was 44 in 21 households, when it was in Tehran province. The 2016 census measured the population of the village as six in five households, by which time the county had been separated from the province in the establishment of Alborz province.
