= Qaleh-ye Rustai =

Village in Alborz province, Iran

Qaleh-ye Rustai قلعه روستائي
- Village
- Country: Iran
- Province: Alborz
- County: Karaj
- District: Central
- Rural District: Mohammadabad

Population (2016)
  - Total: 365
- Time zone: UTC+3:30 (IRST)

Qaleh-ye Rustai (Persian: قلعه روستائي) (Note: Also romanized as Qal‘eh-ye Rūstā‘ī) is a village in Mohammadabad Rural District of the Central District in Karaj County, Alborz province, Iran.

== Demographics ==
=== Population ===
At the time of the 2006 National Census, the village's population was 491 in 135 households, when it was in Tehran province. The 2016 census measured the population of the village as 365 people in 115 households, by which time the county had been separated from the province in the establishment of Alborz province.
