= Karaj prison =

There are three main prisons around Karaj:

- Rajai Shahr prison (a.k.a. Gohardasht Prison),
- Ghezel Hesar Prison, and
- the Central Prison at Karaj.
