= Shahrak-e Taleqani, Alborz =

Village in Alborz province, Iran

Shahrak-e Taleqani Persian: شهرک طالقانی
- Village
- Location within Iran
- Coordinates: 35°52′32″N 50°53′44″E
- Country: Iran
- Province: Alborz
- County: Karaj
- District: Central
- Rural District: Garmdarreh

Population (2016)
  - Total: 111
- Time zone: UTC+3:30 (IRST)

Shahrak-e Taleqani (Persian: شهرک طالقانی) (Note: Also romanized as Shahrak-e Ţāleqānī) is a village in Garmdarreh Rural District of the Central District in Karaj County, Alborz province, Iran.

== Demographics ==
=== Population ===
At the time of the 2006 National Census, the village's population was 200 in 44 households, when it was in Tehran province. The 2016 census measured the population of the village as 111 in 35 households, by which time the county had separated from the province in the establishment of Alborz province. Shahrak-e Taleqani was the most populous village in its rural district.
