= Meshkinabad Rural District =

Rural district in Alborz province, Iran

Meshkinabad Rural District Persian: دهستان مشکین‌آباد
- Rural District
- Location within Iran
- Coordinates: 35°46′N 50°57′E
- Country: Iran
- Province: Alborz
- County: Fardis
- District: Meshkin Dasht
- Established: 2013
- Capital: Shahrak-e Mohandesi-ye Zerai

Population (2016)
  - Total: 16,288
- Time zone: UTC+3:30 (IRST)

Meshkinabad Rural District (Persian: دهستان مشکین‌آباد) is in Meshkin Dasht District of Fardis County, Alborz province, Iran. Its capital is the village of Shahrak-e Mohandesi-ye Zerai.

== History ==
In 2010, Karaj County was separated from Tehran province in the establishment of Alborz province.

In 2013, the city of Meshkin Dasht, the Fardis neighborhood (Note: Became the city of Fardis) in the city of Karaj, and other parts of the county were separated from it in establishing Fardis County. Meshkinabad Rural District was created in the new Meshkin Dasht District.

== Demographics ==
=== Population ===
At the time of the 2016 National Census, the rural district's population was 16,288 in 5,171 households. The most populous of its two villages was Shahrak-e Mohandesi-ye Zerai, with 16,104 people. The village of Soil Fertility Centre reported 57 people.
