= Atashgah, Alborz =

Village in Alborz province, Iran

Atashgah Persian: اتشگاه
- Village
- Location within Iran
- Coordinates: 35°55′05″N 50°59′36″E
- Country: Iran
- Province: Alborz
- County: Karaj
- District: Central
- Rural District: Kamalabad

Population (2016)
  - Total: 300
- Time zone: UTC+3:30 (IRST)

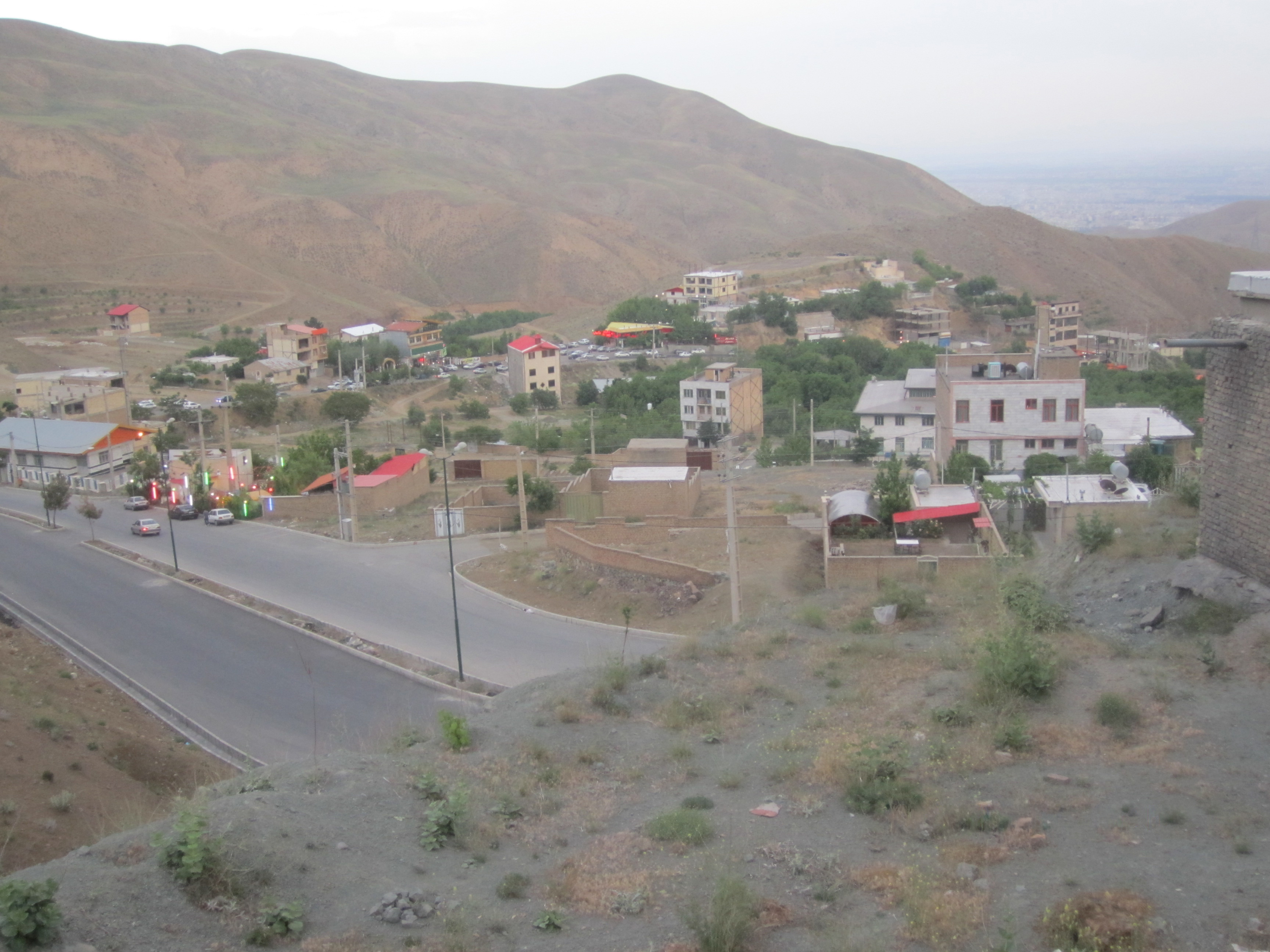

Atashgah (Persian: اتشگاه) (Note: Also romanized as Ātashgāh and Āteshgāh) is a village in Kamalabad Rural District of the Central District in Karaj County, Alborz province, Iran.

== Demographics ==
=== Population ===
At the time of the 2006 National Census, the village's population was 520 in 137 households, when it was in Tehran province. The 2016 census measured the population of the village as 300 in 108 households, by which time the county had been separated from the province in the establishment of Alborz province.
