= Siah Kalan, Alborz =

Village in Alborz province, Iran

Siah Kalan Persian: سياه كلان
- Village
- Location within Iran
- Coordinates: 35°53′17″N 51°00′20″E
- Country: Iran
- Province: Alborz
- County: Karaj
- District: Central
- Rural District: Kamalabad

Population (2016)
  - Total: 567
- Time zone: UTC+3:30 (IRST)

Siah Kalan (Persian: سياه كلان) (Note: Also romanized as Sīāh Kalān; also known as Sīāh Kolāhān) is a village in Kamalabad Rural District of the Central District in Karaj County, Alborz province, Iran.

== Demographics ==
=== Population ===
At the 2006 National Census, the village's population was 712 in 204 households, when it was part of Tehran province. The 2016 census recorded the population as 567 in 200 households, by which time the county had become a part of the newly established Alborz province.
