= Shahrak-e Eslah va Tahiyeh Nahal va Bazar =

Village in Alborz province, Iran

Shahrak-e Eslah va Tahiyeh Nahal va Bazar شهرك اصلاح وتهيه نهال وبذر
- Village
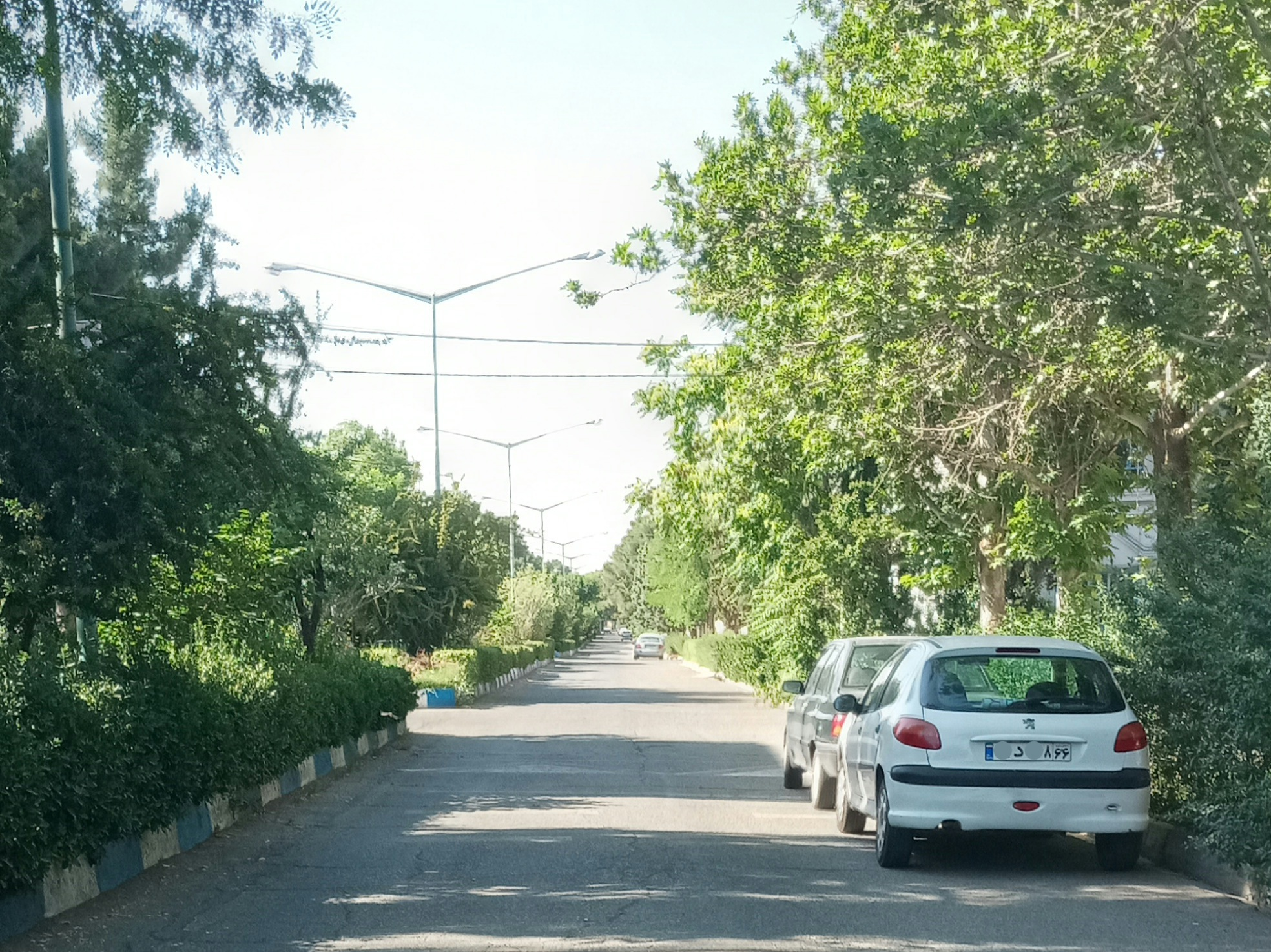
- Landscape in the village

- Location within Iran
- Coordinates: 35°47′28″N 50°56′48″E
- Country: Iran
- Province: Alborz
- County: Karaj
- District: Central
- Rural District: Mohammadabad

Population (2016)
  - Total: 2,001
- Time zone: UTC+3:30 (IRST)

Shahrak-e Eslah va Tahiyeh Nahal va Bazar (Persian: شهرك اصلاح وتهيه نهال وبذر) (Note: Also known as Vabẕar; English: Seedling and Seed Improvement and Supply Town) is a village in Mohammadabad Rural District of the Central District in Karaj County, Alborz province, Iran.

== Demographics ==
=== Population ===
At the time of the 2006 National Census, the village's population was 2,832 in 785 households, when it was in Tehran province. The 2016 census measured the population of the village as 2,001 people in 622 households, by which time the county had been separated from the province in the establishment of Alborz province.
