= Sefid Dasht =

Sefid Dasht (Persian: سفيددشت) may refer to several places in Iran:

- Sefid Dasht, Ardabil, a village in Ardabil province
- Sefiddasht, a city in Chaharmahal and Bakhtiari province
- Sefiddasht Rural District, in Isfahan province
- Sefid Dasht, Lorestan, a village in Lorestan province

== See also ==
Sepiddasht (disambiguation)
