= Aliabad-e Guneh =

Village in Alborz province, Iran

Aliabad-e Guneh علی‌آباد گونه
- Village
- Location within Iran
- Coordinates: 35°45′23″N 50°52′42″E
- Country: Iran
- Province: Alborz
- County: Karaj
- District: Central
- Rural District: Mohammadabad

Population (2016)
  - Total: 3,256
- Time zone: UTC+3:30 (IRST)

Aliabad-e Guneh (Persian: علی‌آباد گونه) (Note: Also romanized as ‘Alīābād-e Gūneh) is a village in Mohammadabad Rural District of the Central District in Karaj County, Alborz province, Iran.

== Demographics ==
=== Population ===
At the time of the 2006 National Census, the village's population was 3,803 in 974 households, when it was in Tehran province. The 2016 census measured the population of the village as 3,256 people in 1,015 households, by which time the county had been separated from the province in the establishment of Alborz province. Aliabad-e Guneh was the most populous village in its rural district.
