= Sepiddasht =

Sepiddasht may refer to several places in Iran:

- Sepiddasht, Alborz, a village in Fardis County, Alborz province
- Sepiddasht Rural District, an administrative division of Khorramabad County, Lorestan province
- Sepiddasht, Lorestan, a city in Khorramabad County, Lorestan province

== See also ==
Sefid Dasht (disambiguation)
