= Haljerd =

Village in Alborz province, Iran

Haljerd Persian: هلجرد
- Village
- Location within Iran
- Coordinates: 35°54′08″N 50°54′26″E
- Country: Iran
- Province: Alborz
- County: Karaj
- District: Central
- Rural District: Kamalabad

Population (2016)
  - Total: 20
- Time zone: UTC+3:30 (IRST)

Haljerd (Persian: هلجرد) (Note: Also romanized as Halah Jerd, Halajerd, Halajird, and Halījerd) is a village in Kamalabad Rural District of the Central District in Karaj County, Alborz province, Iran.

== Demographics ==
=== Population ===
At the time of the 2006 National Census, the village's population was 31 in 11 households, when it was in Tehran province. The 2016 census measured the population of the village as 20 in five households, by which time the county had been separated from the province in the establishment of Alborz province.
