= Vahdat Rural District =

Vahdat Rural District (Persian: دهستان وحدت) may refer to several administrative divisions of Iran:

- Vahdat Rural District (Fardis County), Alborz province
- Vahdat Rural District (Zarand County), Kerman province
- Vahdat Rural District (Landeh County), Kohgiluyeh and Boyer-Ahmad province
