= Bagh-e Pir =

Bagh-e Pir or Bagh Pir or Bagh-i-Pir (Persian: پورزند) may refer to:

- Bagh-e Pir, Alborz
- Bagh Pir, Bushehr
