= Mahmudabad, Alborz =

Neighborhood in Alborz province, Iran

Mahmudabad Persian: محموداباد
- Neighborhood
- Location within Iran
- Coordinates: 35°52′44″N 51°00′11″E
- Country: Iran
- Province: Alborz
- County: Karaj
- District: Central
- City: Karaj

Population (2016)
  - Total: 3,817
- Time zone: UTC+3:30 (IRST)

Mahmudabad (Persian: محموداباد) (Note: Also romanized as Maḩmūdābād) is a neighborhood in the city of Karaj in the Central District of Karaj County, Alborz province, Iran.

== Demographics ==
=== Population ===
At the time of the 2006 National Census, Mahmudabad's population was 2,430 in 680 households, when it was a village in Kamalabad Rural District of Tehran province. The 2016 census measured the population of the village as 3,817 in 1,254 households, by which time the county had been separated from the province in the establishment of Alborz province. It was the most populous village in its rural district.

Mahmudabad was annexed by the city of Karaj in 2021.
