= Darvan =

Village in Alborz province, Iran

Darvan Persian: دروان
- Village
- Location within Iran
- Coordinates: 36°00′05″N 51°01′57″E
- Country: Iran
- Province: Alborz
- County: Karaj
- District: Central
- Rural District: Kamalabad

Population (2016)
  - Total: 182
- Time zone: UTC+3:30 (IRST)

Darvan (Persian: دروان) (Note: Also Romanized as Darvān) is a village in Kamalabad Rural District of the Central District in Karaj County, Alborz province, Iran.

== Demographics ==
=== Population ===
At the time of the 2006 National Census, the village's population was 99 in 37 households, when it was in Tehran province. The 2016 census measured the population of the village as 182 in 64 households, by which time the county had been separated from the province in the establishment of Alborz province.
