= Golestanak =

Golestanak (Persian: گلستانك) may refer to:

- Golestanak, Alborz
- Golestanak, Lorestan
