= Execution of Mehdi Hassani and Behrouz Ehsani =

2025 executions in Iran

- Date: 27 July 2025
- Location: Ghezel Hesar Prison, Karaj, Iran
- Type: Execution
- Deaths: 2
- Charges: Baghi (rebellion), moharebeh, ifsad fil-arz
- Verdict: Death sentence (16 January 2025)

The execution of Mehdi Hassani and Behrouz Ehsani concerns the death sentences imposed on two political prisoners in Iran and the subsequent international response to their cases.

On 26 January, Ehsani and Hassani were transferred from Tehran’s Evin Prison to Ghezel Hesar Prison. Human rights organizations raised concerns about the judicial proceedings, citing allegations of torture, coerced confessions, and violations of fair-trial standards. The charges reportedly brought against the two men included baghi (rebellion), moharebeh (waging war against God), and ifsad fil-arz (spreading corruption on Earth).

On 16 January 2025, Behrouz Ehsani and Mehdi Hassani were sentenced to death by Judge Iman Afshari, head of Branch 26 of the Revolutionary Court in Tehran. According to the Human Rights Activists News Agency (HRANA), the verdicts were formally communicated to their respective lawyers.

In an appeal to halt the planned executions, 166 experts addressed a joint request to United Nations High Commissioner for Human Rights Volker Türk, calling for UN intervention. The New York City Bar Association also publicly condemned the death sentences.

Maryam Hassani, the daughter of Mehdi Hassani, confirmed that Ehsani and Hassani were executed on 27 July 2025. According to reports, their families were not permitted a final visit before the executions.
