= Vahdat Rural District (Fardis County) =

Rural district in Alborz province, Iran

Vahdat Rural District Persian: دهستان وحدت
- Rural District
- Location within Iran
- Coordinates: 35°45′N 51°01′E
- Country: Iran
- Province: Alborz
- County: Fardis
- District: Central
- Established: 2013
- Capital: Shahrak-e Vahdat

Population (2016)
  - Total: 3,617
- Time zone: UTC+3:30 (IRST)

Vahdat Rural District (Persian: دهستان وحدت) is in the Central District of Fardis County, Alborz province, Iran. Its capital is the neighborhood of Shahrak-e Vahdat.

== History ==
In 2010, Karaj County was separated from Tehran province in the establishment of Alborz province.

In 2013, the city of Meshkin Dasht, the Fardis neighborhood (Note: Became the city of Fardis) in the city of Karaj, and other parts of the county were separated from it in establishing Fardis County. Vahdat Rural District was created in the new Central District.

== Demographics ==
=== Population ===
At the time of the 2016 National Census, the rural district's population was 3,617 in 1,157 households. Its only village was Sarhadabad, with 3,617 people.
