= Golestanak, Alborz =

Village in Alborz province, Iran

Golestanak گلستانك
- Village
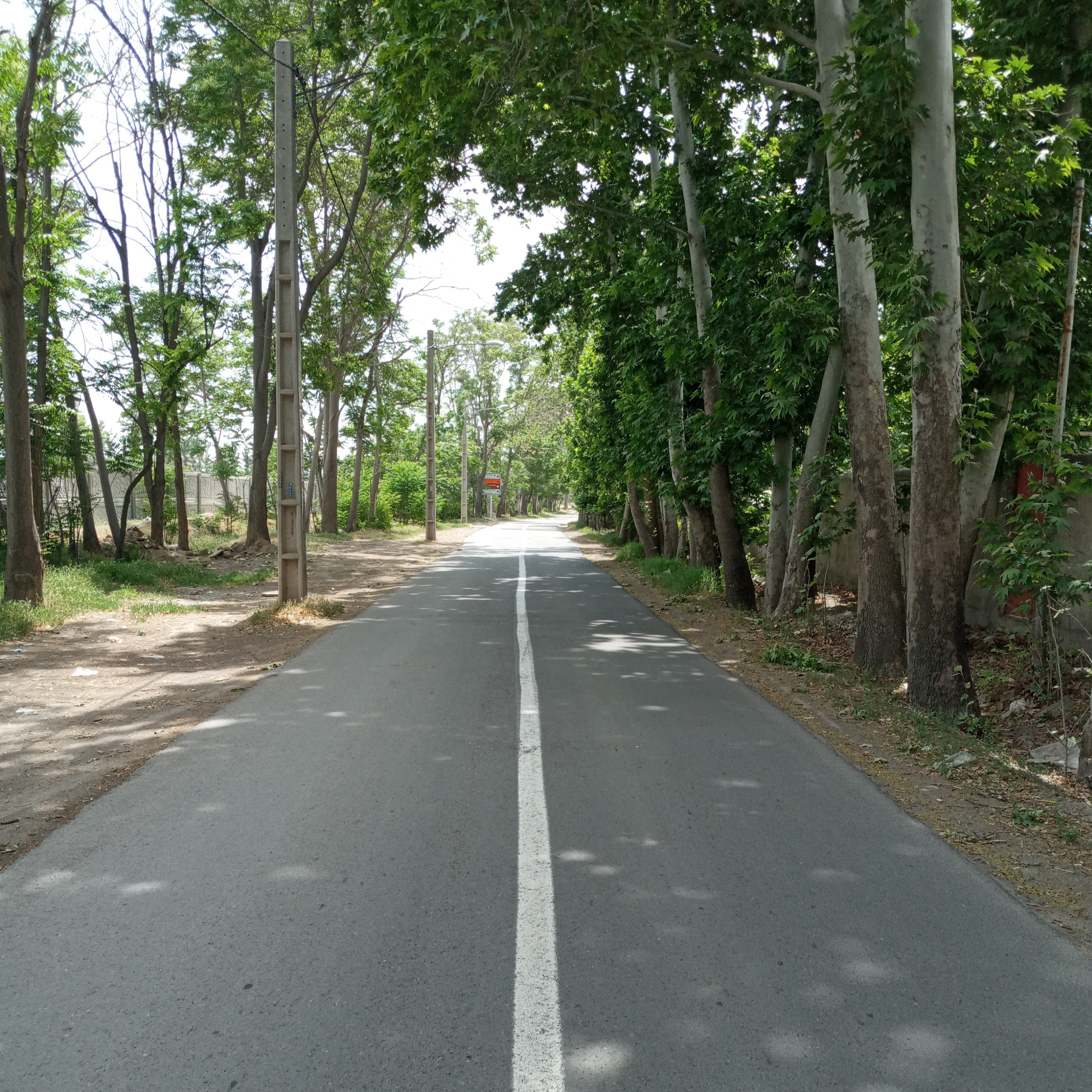
- Landscape in the village of Golestanak

- Location within Iran
- Coordinates: 35°46′29″N 50°53′53″E
- Country: Iran
- Province: Alborz
- County: Karaj
- District: Central
- Rural District: Mohammadabad

Population (2016)
  - Total: 1,827
- Time zone: UTC+3:30 (IRST)

Golestanak (Persian: گلستانك) (Note: Also romanized as Golestānak; also known as Gulistān) is a village in Mohammadabad Rural District of the Central District in Karaj County, Alborz province, Iran.

== Demographics ==
=== Population ===
At the time of the 2006 National Census, the village's population was 1,468 in 371 households, when it was in Tehran province. The 2016 census measured the population of the village as 1,827 people in 539 households, by which time the county had been separated from the province in the establishment of Alborz province.
