= Mohammadshahr =

City in Alborz province, Iran

Mohammadshahr Persian: محمدشهر
- City
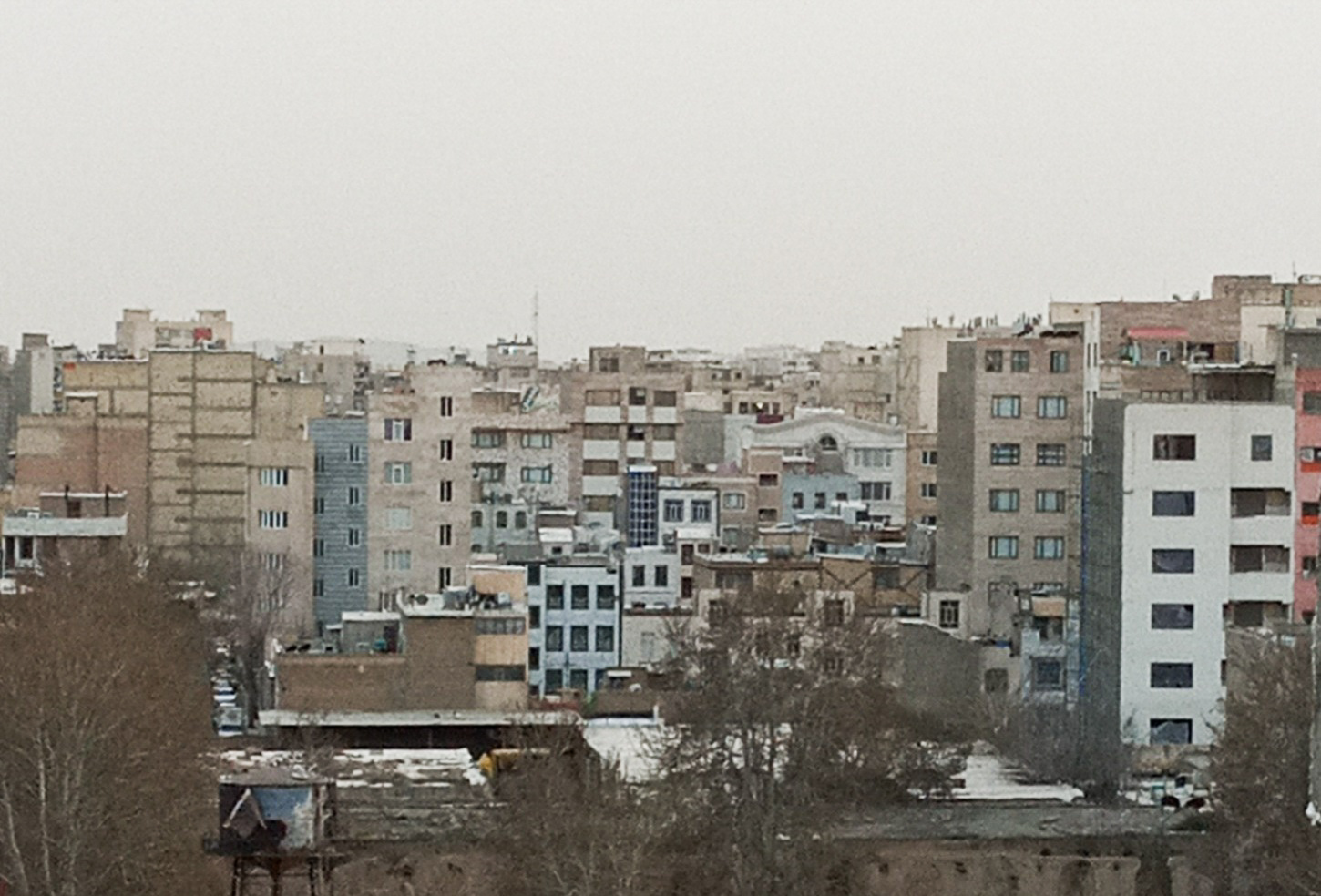

- Location within Iran
- Coordinates: 35°45′12″N 50°54′05″E
- Country: Iran
- Province: Alborz
- County: Karaj
- District: Central

Population (2016)
  - Urban: 119,418
- Time zone: UTC+3:30 (IRST)

Mohammadshahr (Persian: محمدشهر) (Note: Also romanized as Moḩamadshahr; also known as Mahanshahr (ماهانشهر), also romanized as Māhānŝahr) is a city in the Central District of Karaj County, Alborz province, Iran, serving as the administrative center for Mohammadabad Rural District.

== Demographics ==
=== Population ===
At the time of the 2006 National Census, the city's population was 83,126 in 21,071 households, when it was in Tehran province. The 2016 census measured the population of the city as 119,418 people in 35,902 households, by which time the county had been separated from the province in the establishment of Alborz province.
