= Qezel Hesar, Karaj =

Village in Alborz province, Iran

Qezel Hesar قزل حصار
- Village
- Location within Iran
- Coordinates: 35°48′20″N 50°51′40″E
- Country: Iran
- Province: Alborz
- County: Karaj
- District: Central
- Rural District: Mohammadabad

Population (2016)
  - Total: Below reporting threshold
- Time zone: UTC+3:30 (IRST)

Qezel Hesar (Persian: قزل حصار) (Note: Also romanized as Qezel Ḥeṣār; also known as Ghezel Ḥeṣār and Ghiral Hisār) is a village in Mohammadabad Rural District of the Central District in Karaj County, Alborz province, Iran. Ghezel Hesar prison is a large state prison.

== Demographics ==
=== Population ===
At the time of the 2006 National Census, the village's population was 807 in 208 households, when it was in Tehran province. The 2016 census measured the population of the village as below the reporting threshold, by which time the county had been separated from the province in the establishment of Alborz province.
