= Kamalabad Rural District =

Rural district in Alborz province, Iran

Kamalabad Rural District Persian: دهستان كمال آباد
- Rural District
- Location within Iran
- Coordinates: 35°56′N 50°59′E
- Country: Iran
- Province: Alborz
- County: Karaj
- District: Central
- Capital: Kamal Shahr

Population (2016)
  - Total: 4,892
- Time zone: UTC+3:30 (IRST)

Kamalabad Rural District (Persian: دهستان كمال آباد) is in the Central District of Karaj County, Alborz province, Iran. It is administered from the city of Kamal Shahr.

== Demographics ==
=== Population ===
At the time of the 2006 National Census, the rural district's population (as a part of Tehran province) was 3,836 in 1,090 households. The 2016 census measured the population of the rural district as 4,892 people in 1,636 households, by which time the county had been separated from the province in the establishment of Alborz province. The most populous of its six villages was Mahmudabad (now a neighborhood in the city of Karaj), with 3,817 people.

=== Other villages in the rural district ===
- Atashgah
- Darvan
- Haljerd
- Khvares
- Siah Kalan
