= Bagh-e Pir, Alborz =

Village in Alborz province, Iran

Bagh-e Pir Persian: باغ پير
- Village
- Location within Iran
- Coordinates: 35°50′01″N 51°02′44″E
- Country: Iran
- Province: Alborz
- County: Karaj
- District: Central
- Rural District: Garmdarreh

Population (2016)
  - Total: 94
- Time zone: UTC+3:30 (IRST)

Bagh-e Pir (Persian: باغ پير) (Note: Also romanized as Bāgh-e Pīr) is a village in Garmdarreh Rural District of the Central District in Karaj County, Alborz province, Iran.

== Demographics ==
=== Population ===
At the time of the 2006 National Census, the village's population was 208 in 57 households, when it was in Tehran province. The 2016 census measured the population of the village as 94 in 33 households, by which time the county had separated from the province in the establishment of Alborz province.
