= Mahdasht =

City in Alborz province, Iran

Mahdasht Persian: ماهدشت
- City
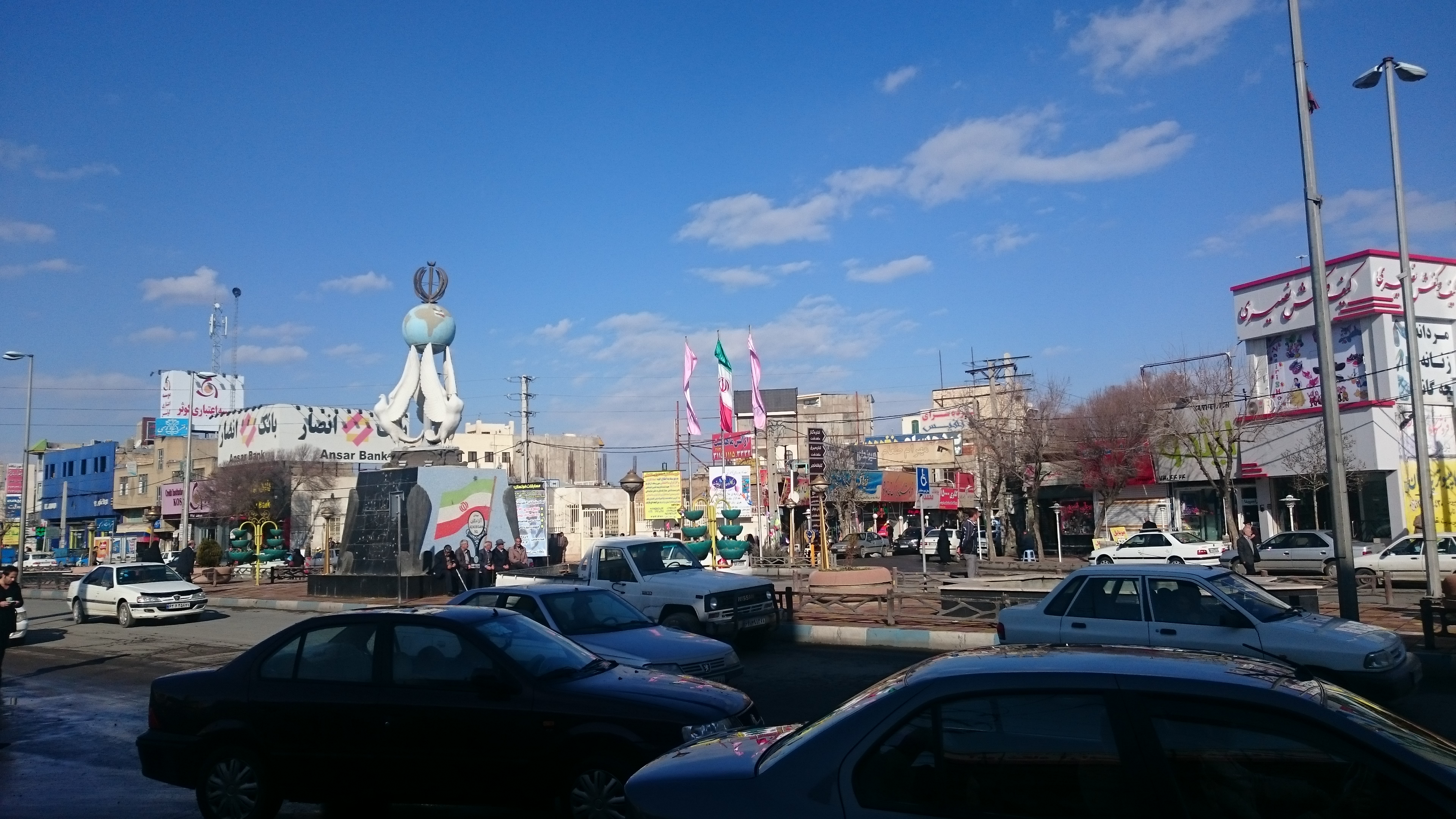
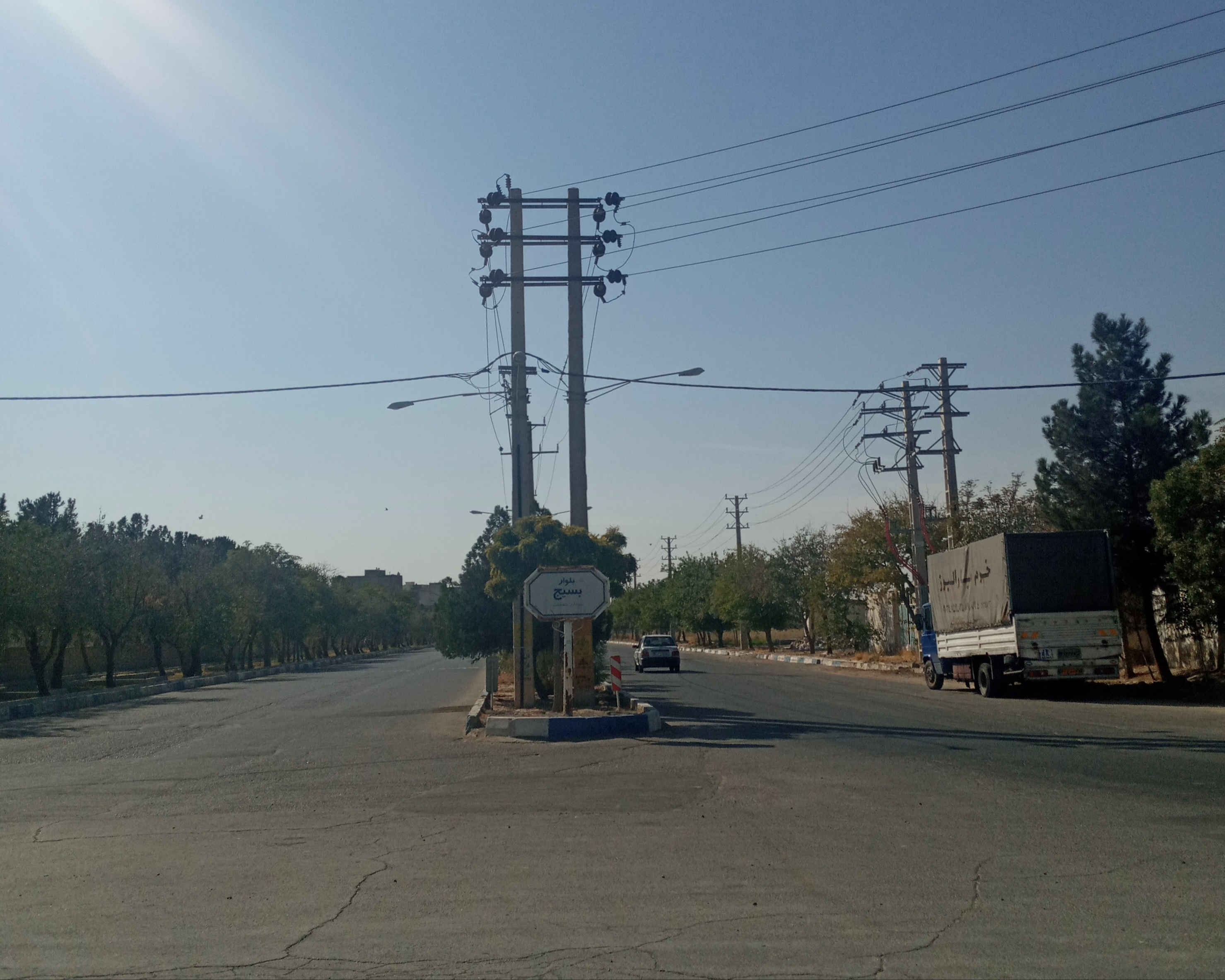
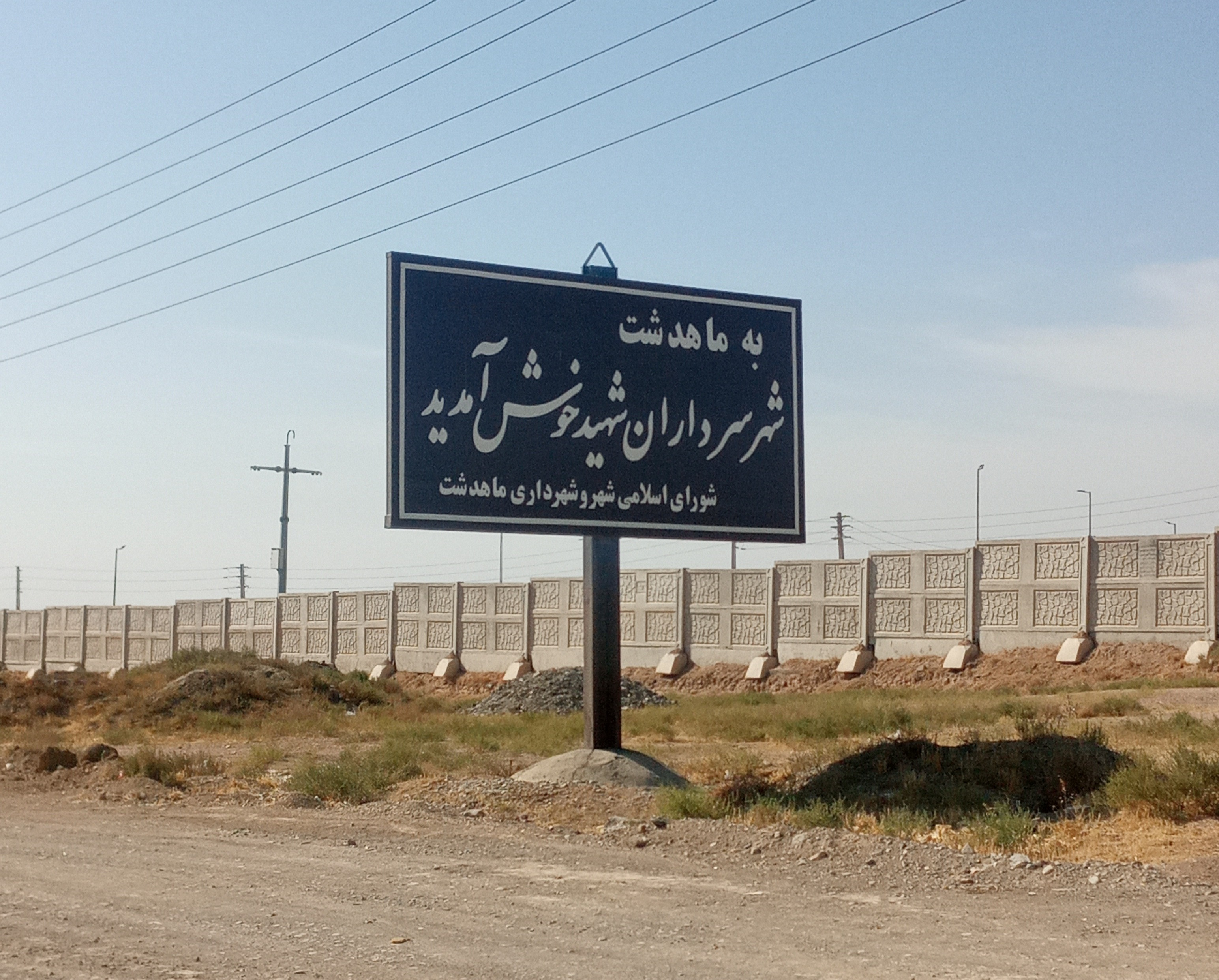

- Location within Iran
- Coordinates: 35°43′40″N 50°48′32″E
- Country: Iran
- Province: Alborz
- County: Karaj
- District: Central
- Established as a city: 1991

Population (2016)
  - Total: 62,910
- Time zone: UTC+3:30 (IRST)
- Area code: 026

Mahdasht (Persian: ماهدشت) (Note: Also romanized as Māhdāsht; formerly known as Mardabad (مَردآباد), also romanized as Mardābād) is a city in the Central District of Karaj County, Alborz province, Iran. The village of Mardabad was converted to the city of Mahdasht in 1991.

== Demographics ==
=== Population ===
At the time of the 2006 National Census, the city's population was 43,100 in 10,760 households, when it was in Tehran province. The 2016 census measured the population of the city as 62,910 people in 19,147 households, by which time the county had been separated from the province in the establishment of Alborz province.

== Notable people ==
Baito Abbaspour, bodybuilder.

Majid Khodabandelou, retired footballer who previously played in the top three divisions of the Iranian football league system.
