= Garmdarreh Rural District =

Rural district in Alborz province, Iran

Garmdarreh Rural District Persian: دهستان گرمدره
- Rural District
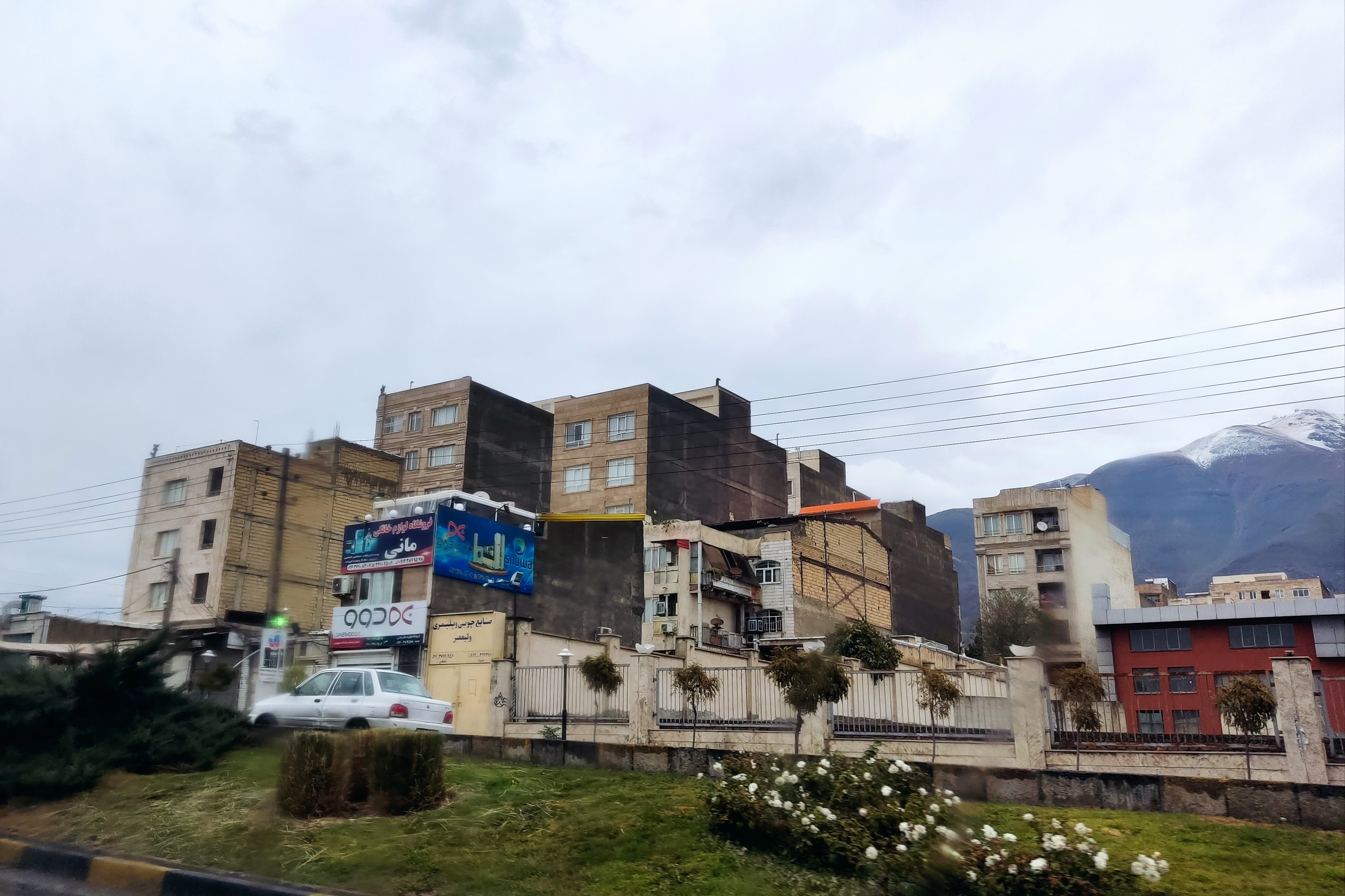
- Garmdarreh

- Location within Iran
- Coordinates: 35°48′N 51°05′E
- Country: Iran
- Province: Alborz
- County: Karaj
- District: Central
- Established: 1987
- Capital: Garmdarreh

Population (2016)
  - Total: 221
- Time zone: UTC+3:30 (IRST)

Garmdarreh Rural District (Persian: دهستان گرمدره) is in the Central District of Karaj County, Alborz province, Iran. It is administered from the city of Garmdarreh.

== Demographics ==
=== Population ===
At the time of the 2006 National Census, the rural district's population (as a part of Tehran province) was 544 in 138 households. The 2016 census measured the population of the rural district as 221 people in 75 households, by which time the county had been separated from the province in the establishment of Alborz province. The most populous of its 13 villages was Shahrak-e Taleqani, with 111 people. The only other villages in the rural district reporting a population were Bagh-e Pir (94) and Mazraeh-ye Kazemabad (9).
