= Meshkin Tappeh =

Meshkin Tappeh مشكين تپه
- Village
- Location within Iran
- Coordinates: 35°50′12″N 50°02′05″E
- Country: Iran
- Province: Qazvin
- County: Buin Zahra
- Bakhsh: Central
- Rural District: Zahray-ye Bala

Population (2006)
  - Total: 346
- Time zone: UTC+3:30 (IRST)
  - Summer (DST): UTC+4:30 (IRDT)

Meshkin Tappeh (Persian: مشكين تپه, also Romanized as Meshkīn Tappeh and Moshkīn Tappeh; also known as Qeshlāq-e Moshgīn and Qishlāq Mushkīn) is a village in Zahray-ye Bala Rural District, in the Central District of Buin Zahra County, Qazvin Province, Iran. At the 2006 census, its population was 346, in 103 families.
