= Garm Darreh, West Azerbaijan =

Garm Darreh گرم دره
- Village
- Location within Iran
- Coordinates: 38°45′37″N 44°34′45″E
- Country: Iran
- Province: West Azerbaijan
- County: Khoy
- Bakhsh: Safayyeh
- Rural District: Sokmanabad

Population (2006)
  - Total: 358
- Time zone: UTC+3:30 (IRST)
  - Summer (DST): UTC+4:30 (IRDT)

Garm Darreh (Persian: گرم دره; also known as Garmdaraq) is a village in Sokmanabad Rural District, Safayyeh District, Khoy County, West Azerbaijan Province, Iran. At the 2006 census, its population was 358, in 69 families.
