= Zakan, Qazvin =

Zakan زاكان
- Village
- Location within Iran
- Coordinates: 36°21′43″N 49°51′46″E
- Country: Iran
- Province: Qazvin
- County: Qazvin
- Bakhsh: Central
- Rural District: Eqbal-e Gharbi

Population (2006)
  - Total: 351
- Time zone: UTC+3:30 (IRST)
  - Summer (DST): UTC+4:30 (IRDT)

Zakan (Persian: زاكان, also Romanized as Zākān; also known as Meshkīn Deh) is a village in Eqbal-e Gharbi Rural District, in the Central District of Qazvin County, Qazvin Province, Iran. At the 2006 census, its population was 351, in 83 families.
