= Kamal Shahr =

City in Alborz province, Iran

Kamal Shahr Persian: کمال‌شهر
- City
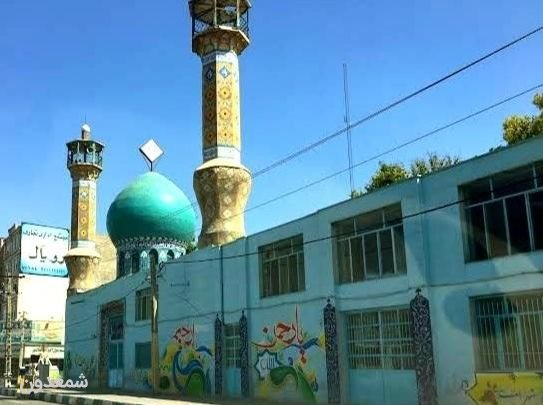

- Location within Iran
- Coordinates: 35°51′57″N 50°52′18″E
- Country: Iran
- Province: Alborz
- County: Karaj
- District: Central
- Established as a city: 1996

Population (2016)
  - Total: 141,669
- Time zone: UTC+3:30 (IRST)

Kamal Shahr (Persian: کمال‌شهر) (Note: Also romanized as Kamāl Shahr; also known as Kamalabad (کمال‌آباد), also romanized as Kamālābād) is a city in the Central District of Karaj County, Alborz province, Iran, serving as the administrative center for Kamalabad Rural District.

== Demographics ==
=== Population ===
At the time of the 2006 National Census, the city's population was 80,435 in 20,940 households, when it was in Tehran province. The 2016 census measured the population of the city as 141,669 people in 43,171 households, by which time the county had been separated from the province in the establishment of Alborz province.
