= Garmdarreh =

City in Alborz province, Iran

Garmdarreh Persian: گرمدره
- City
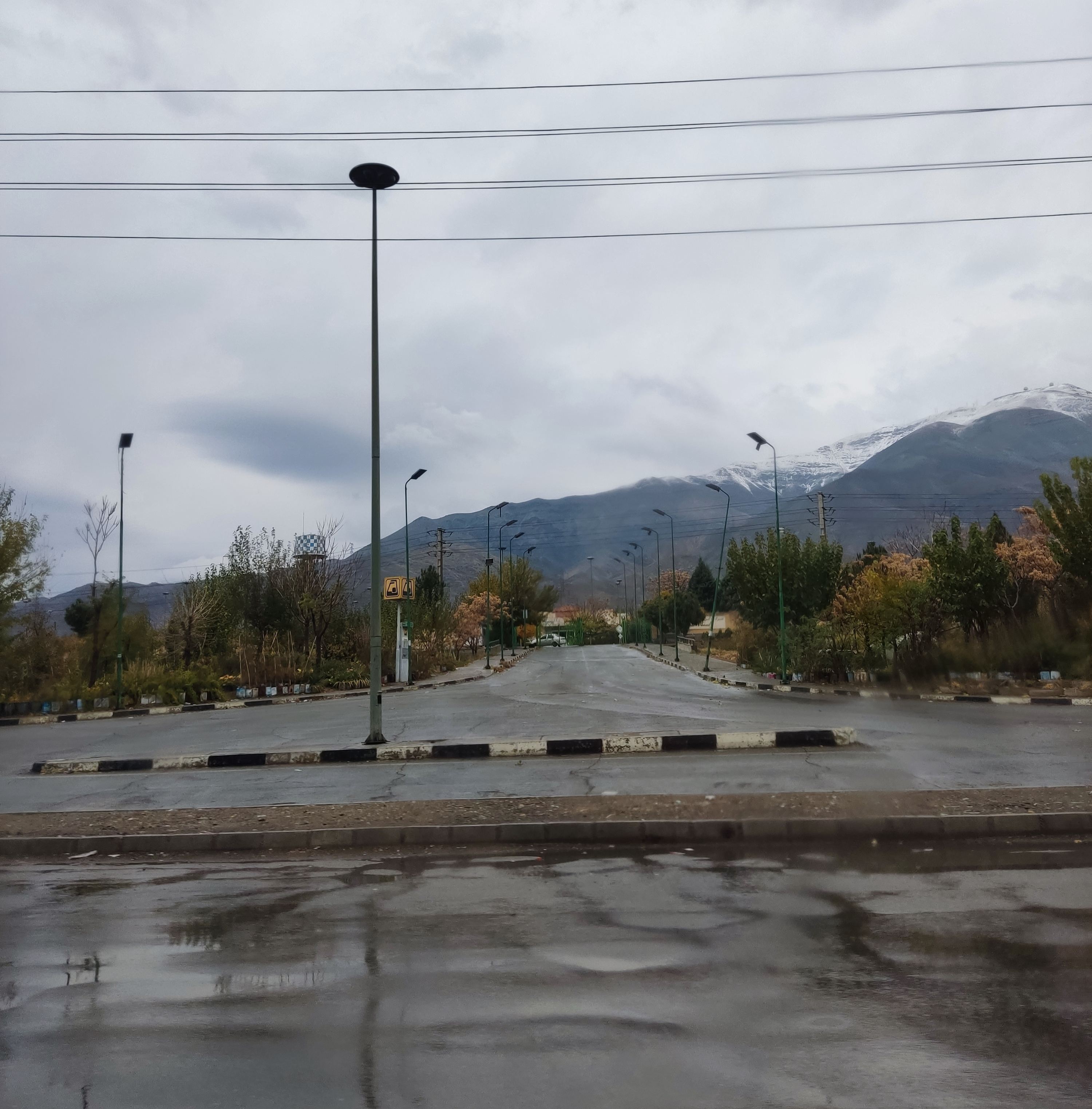
- Garmdareh

- Location within Iran
- Coordinates: 35°44′52″N 51°04′04″E
- Country: Iran
- Province: Alborz
- County: Karaj
- District: Central
- Established as a city: 2004

Government

Population (2016)
  - Total: 22,726
- Time zone: UTC+3:30 (IRST)

Garmdarreh (Persian: گرمدره) (Note: Also romanized as Garm Darreh; also known as Garmdarreh-ye Pā'īn) is a city in the Central District of Karaj County, Alborz province, Iran, serving as the administrative center for Garmdarreh Rural District. In 2004, the village of Garmdarreh merged with the villages of Kuhak (کوهک), Amirabad (امیرآباد), Qaleh-ye Salar Nasriyeh-ye Garmdarreh (قلعه سالارناصریه گرمدره‌), Sa'adatiyeh-ye Qadim (سعادتیه قدیم), and Sa'adatiyeh-ye Now (سعادتیه نو), converting to the city of Garmdarreh.

== Demographics ==
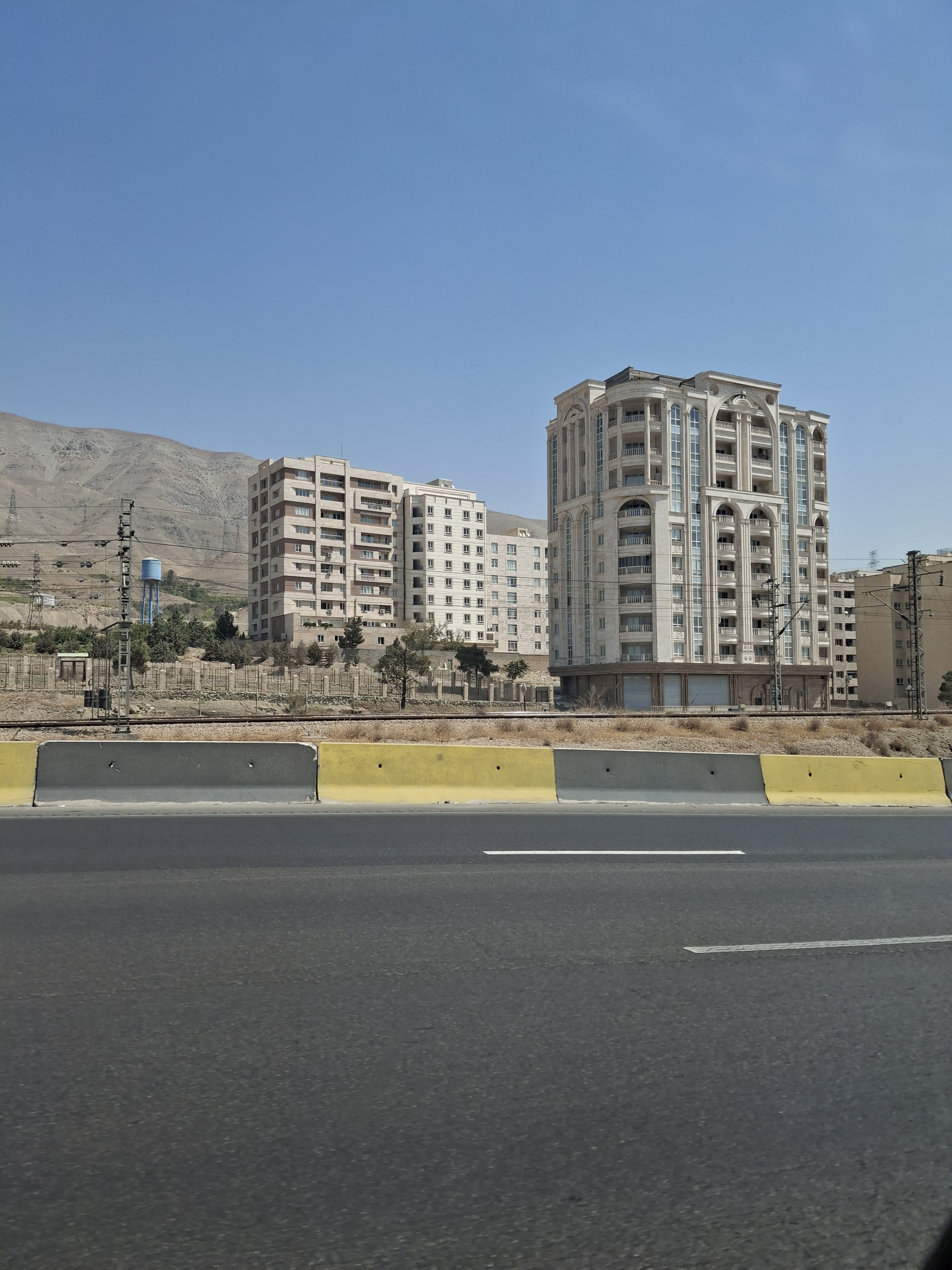
Garmdarreh city, 2025

=== Population ===
At the time of the 2006 National Census, the city's population was 12,738 in 3,329 households, when it was in Tehran province. The 2016 census measured the population of the city as 22,726 people in 7,129 households, by which time the county had been separated from the province in the establishment of Alborz province.
