= Sefid Dasht, Ardabil =

Village in Ardabil Province, Iran

Sefid Dasht
- Location in Iran
- Coordinates: 37°16′21″N 48°53′46″E
- Country: Iran
- Province: Ardabil Province
- Time zone: UTC+3:30 (IRST)
  - Summer (DST): UTC+4:30 (IRDT)

Sefid Dasht is a village in the Ardabil Province of Iran.
