= Meshkin Dasht District =

District in Alborz province, Iran

Meshkin Dasht District Persian: بخش مشکين دشت
- District
- Location within Iran
- Coordinates: 35°44′N 50°57′E
- Country: Iran
- Province: Alborz
- County: Fardis
- Established: 2013
- Capital: Meshkin Dasht

Population (2016)
  - Total: 83,700
- Time zone: UTC+3:30 (IRST)

Meshkin Dasht District (Persian: بخش مشکين دشت) is in Fardis County of Alborz province, Iran. Its capital is the city of Meshkin Dasht.

== History ==
In 2010, Karaj County was separated from Tehran province in the establishment of Alborz province.

In 2013, the city of Meshkin Dasht, the Fardis neighborhood (Note: Became the city of Fardis) in the city of Karaj, and other parts of the county were separated from it in establishing Fardis County, which was divided into two districts of two rural districts each. The neighborhood was elevated to city status as Fardis and transferred to the new Central District as the county's capital.

== Demographics ==
=== Population ===
At the time of the 2016 National Census, Meshkin Dasht District's population was 83,700 inhabitants in 25,490 households.

=== Administrative divisions ===
Meshkin Dasht District Population
Administrative Divisions	2016
Farrokhabad RD	5,407
Meshkinabad RD	16,288
Meshkin Dasht (city)	62,005
Total	83,700
RD = Rural District
