= Ghezel Hesar prison =

Iranian prison

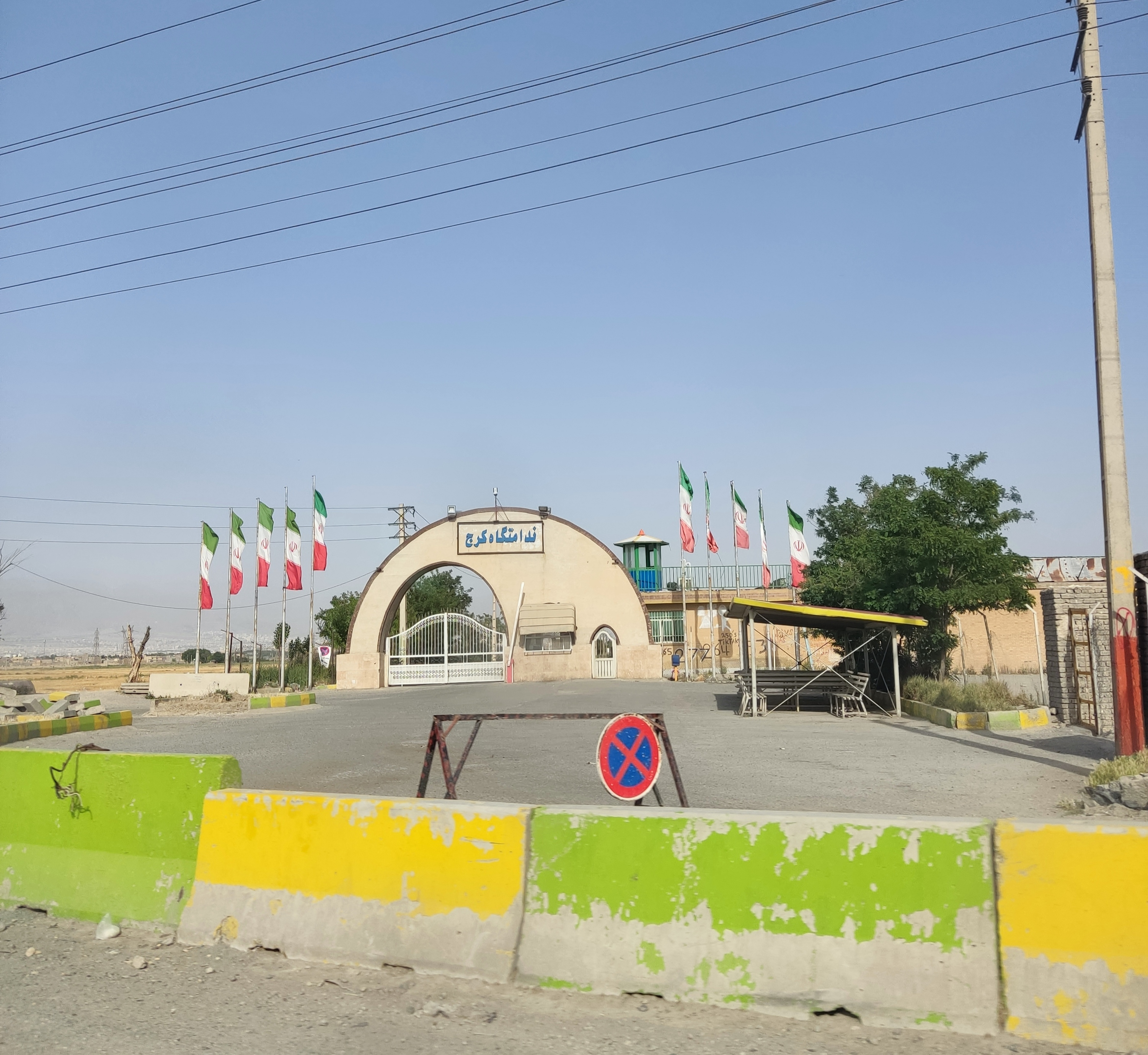
- Location in Tehran Province
- Location: Ghezel Hesar, Iran; 35°48′12″N 50°51′38″E
- Status: Operational
- Capacity: est. 20,000 (2011)
- Opened: 1964; 62 years ago
- Managed by: Judicial system of Iran

Ghezel Hesar prison (Persian: زندان قزل‌حصار) is the largest state prison in Iran. As of 2011, it was holding about 20,000 prisoners, of which 13,000 were held on drug-related charges - said to be four times its planned capacity.
It is located in Ghezel Hesar, city of Karaj, 20 km northwest of the Iranian capital Tehran (there are two other prisons around Karaj: Rajai Shahr prison and the Central Prison at Karaj).

The Ghezel Hesar prison is infamous for its conditions. In March 2011, it made headlines when, according to official reports, 14 people were killed and 33 wounded during a prison revolt. The actual number of victims may have been higher. Former prisoners report torture and physical abuse by the staff, catastrophic hygiene conditions, and a lack of medical care. There are reports that clashes inside Karaj Ghezel Hesar Prison began when some prisoners protested against the execution of dozens of other prisoners. One hundred fifty people are said to have suffered serious injuries, and several dozens to have been killed. Sources close to the government have announced that 47 people have been killed or injured in this incident, yet this number differs dramatically from similar reports from independent sources.
May 2015 has seen mass executions of prisoners: between May 6 and June 10, 2015, at least 77 inmates, all charged with drug offenses, were executed in Ghezelhesar prison. The execution wave started after prisoners had gathered in the prison's yard to ask Ali Khamenei for forgiveness.

== See also ==
- 1988 executions of Iranian political prisoners
- 2010 Iranian political prisoners' hunger strike for prisoners' rights
- Human rights in Iran
- Judicial system of Iran #Prison system
- List of prisons in Iran
- White torture in Iran
