= Central District (Fardis County) =

District in Alborz province, Iran

Central District (Fardis County) Persian: بخش مرکزی شهرستان فردیس
- District
- Location within Iran
- Coordinates: 35°45′N 51°00′E
- Country: Iran
- Province: Alborz
- County: Fardis
- Established: 2013
- Capital: Fardis

Population (2016)
  - Total: 188,129
- Time zone: UTC+3:30 (IRST)

The Central District of Fardis County (Persian: بخش مرکزی شهرستان فردیس) is in Alborz province, Iran. Its capital is the city of Fardis. (Note: Formerly the Fardis neighborhood of the city of Karaj)

== History ==
In 2010, Karaj County was separated from Tehran province in the establishment of Alborz province.

In 2013, the city of Meshkin Dasht, the Fardis neighborhood (Note: Became the city of Fardis) in the city of Karaj, and other parts of the county were separated from it in establishing Fardis County, which was divided into two districts of two rural districts each. The neighborhood was elevated to city status as Fardis and transferred to the new Central District as the county's capital.

== Demographics ==
=== Population ===
At the time of the 2016 National Census, the district's population was 188,129 inhabitants in 61,129 households.

=== Administrative divisions ===
Central District (Fardis County) Population
Administrative Divisions	2016
Fardis RD	3,338
Vahdat RD	3,617
Fardis (city)	181,174
Total	188,129
RD = Rural District
