= Mohammadabad Rural District (Karaj County) =

Rural district in Alborz province, Iran

Mohammadabad Rural District Persian: دهستان محمدآباد
- Rural District
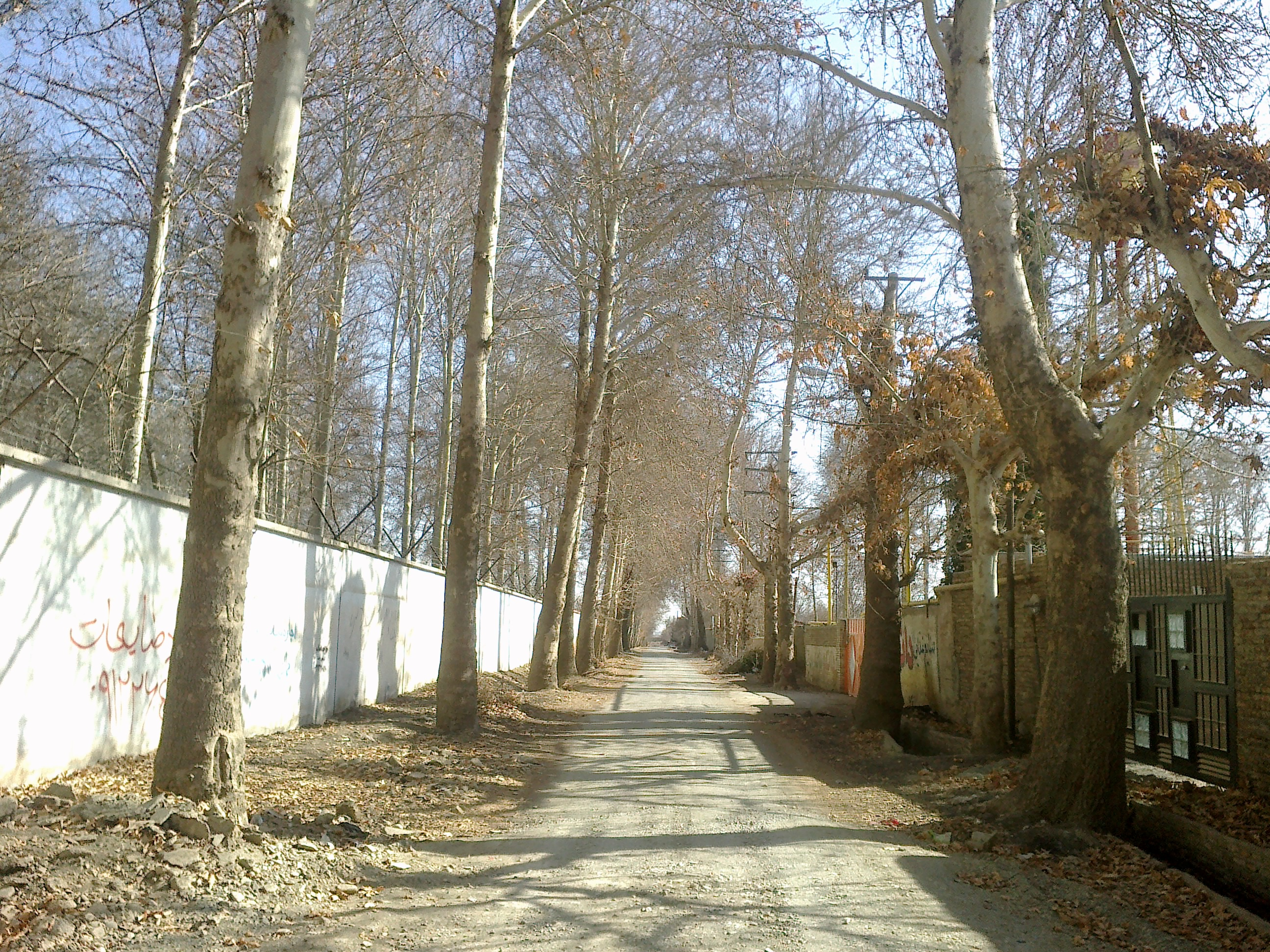
- Mihan Street in Mohammadshahr

- Location within Iran
- Coordinates: 35°45′N 50°51′E
- Country: Iran
- Province: Alborz
- County: Karaj
- District: Central
- Established: 1987
- Capital: Mohammadshahr

Population (2016)
  - Total: 11,939
- Time zone: UTC+3:30 (IRST)

Mohammadabad Rural District (Persian: دهستان محمدآباد) is in the Central District of Karaj County, Alborz province, Iran. It is administered from the city of Mohammadshahr.

== Demographics ==
=== Population ===
At the time of the 2006 National Census, the rural district's population (as a part of Tehran province) was 22,099 in 5,788 households. The 2016 census measured the population of the rural district as 11,939 people in 2,293 households, by which time the county had been separated from the province in the establishment of Alborz province. The most populous of its 13 villages was Aliabad-e Guneh, with 3,256 people.

=== Other villages in the rural district ===
- Golestanak
- Qaleh-ye Rustai
- Qezel Hesar
- Shahrak-e Eslah va Tahiyeh Nahal va Bazar
