= Fardis County =

County in Alborz province, Iran

Fardis County Persian: شهرستان فردیس
- County
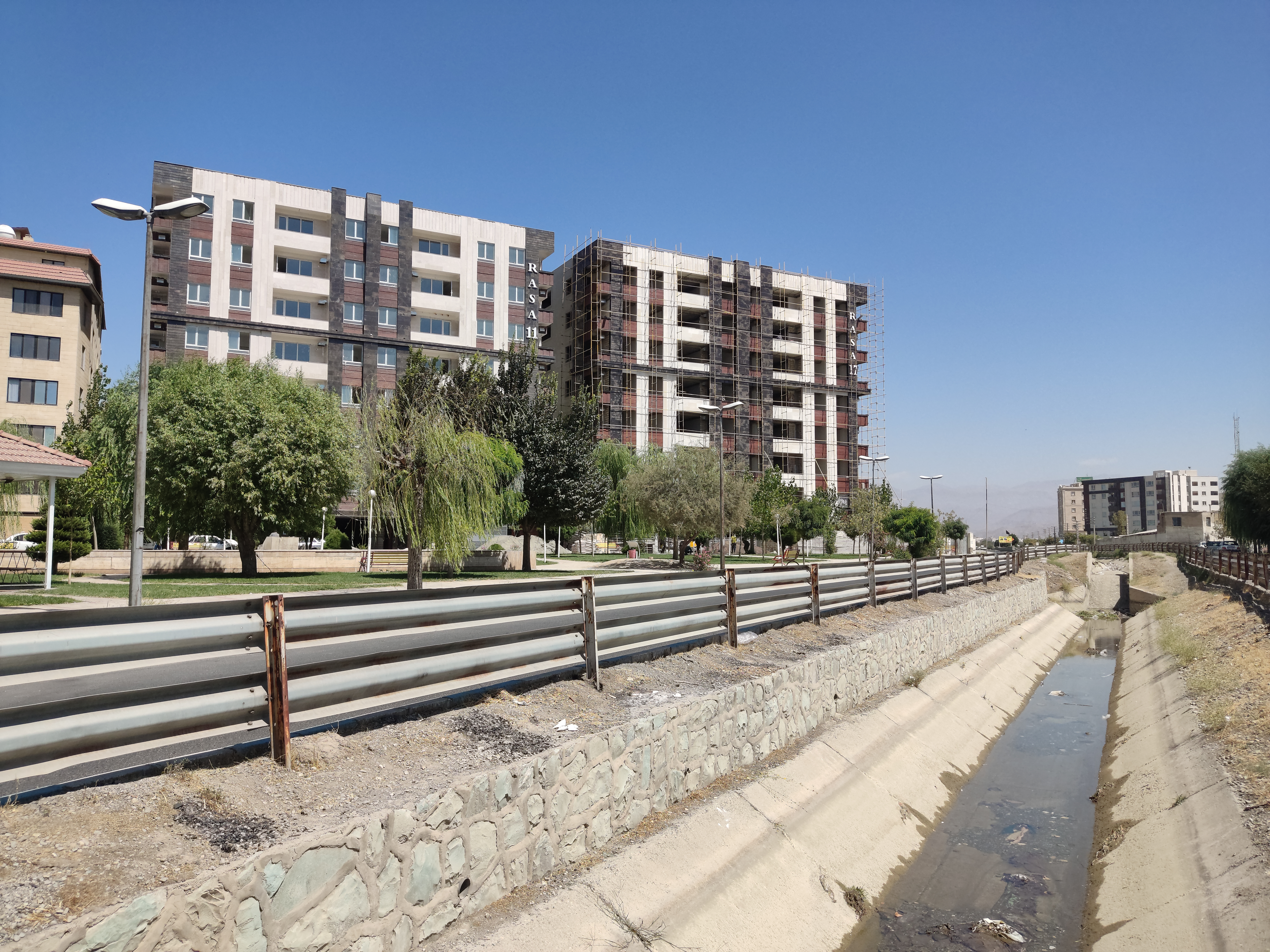
- Landscape in the city of Meshkin Dasht

- Location of Fardis County in Alborz province (bottom, pink)

- Location of Alborz province in Iran
- Coordinates: 35°45′N 50°58′E
- Country: Iran
- Province: Alborz
- Established: 2013
- Capital: Fardis
- Districts: Central, Meshkin Dasht

Area
  - Total: 76 km^{2} (29 sq mi)

Population (2016)
  - Total: 271,829
  - Density: 3,600/km^{2} (9,300/sq mi)
- Time zone: UTC+3:30 (IRST)

Fardis County (Persian: شهرستان فردیس) is in Alborz province, Iran. Its capital is the city of Fardis. (Note: Formerly the Fardis neighborhood of the city of Karaj)

== History ==
In 2010, Karaj County was separated from Tehran province in the establishment of Alborz province.

In 2013, the city of Meshkin Dasht, the Fardis neighborhood (Note: Became the city of Fardis) in the city of Karaj, and other parts of the county were separated from it in establishing Fardis County, which was divided into two districts of two rural districts each. The neighborhood was elevated to city status as Fardis and transferred to the new Central District as the county's capital.

== Demographics ==
=== Population ===
At the time of the 2016 National Census, the county's population was 271,829 in 86,619 households.

=== Administrative divisions ===
Fardis County's population and administrative structure are shown in the following table.

Fardis County Population
Administrative Divisions	2016
Central District	188,129
Fardis RD	3,338
Vahdat RD	3,617
Fardis (city)	181,174
Meshkin Dasht District	83,700
Farrokhabad RD	5,407
Meshkinabad RD	16,288
Meshkin Dasht (city)	62,005
Total	271,829
RD = Rural District

== See also ==
Media related to Fardis County at Wikimedia Commons
