= Fardis =

City in Alborz province, Iran

Fardis Persian: فردیس
- City
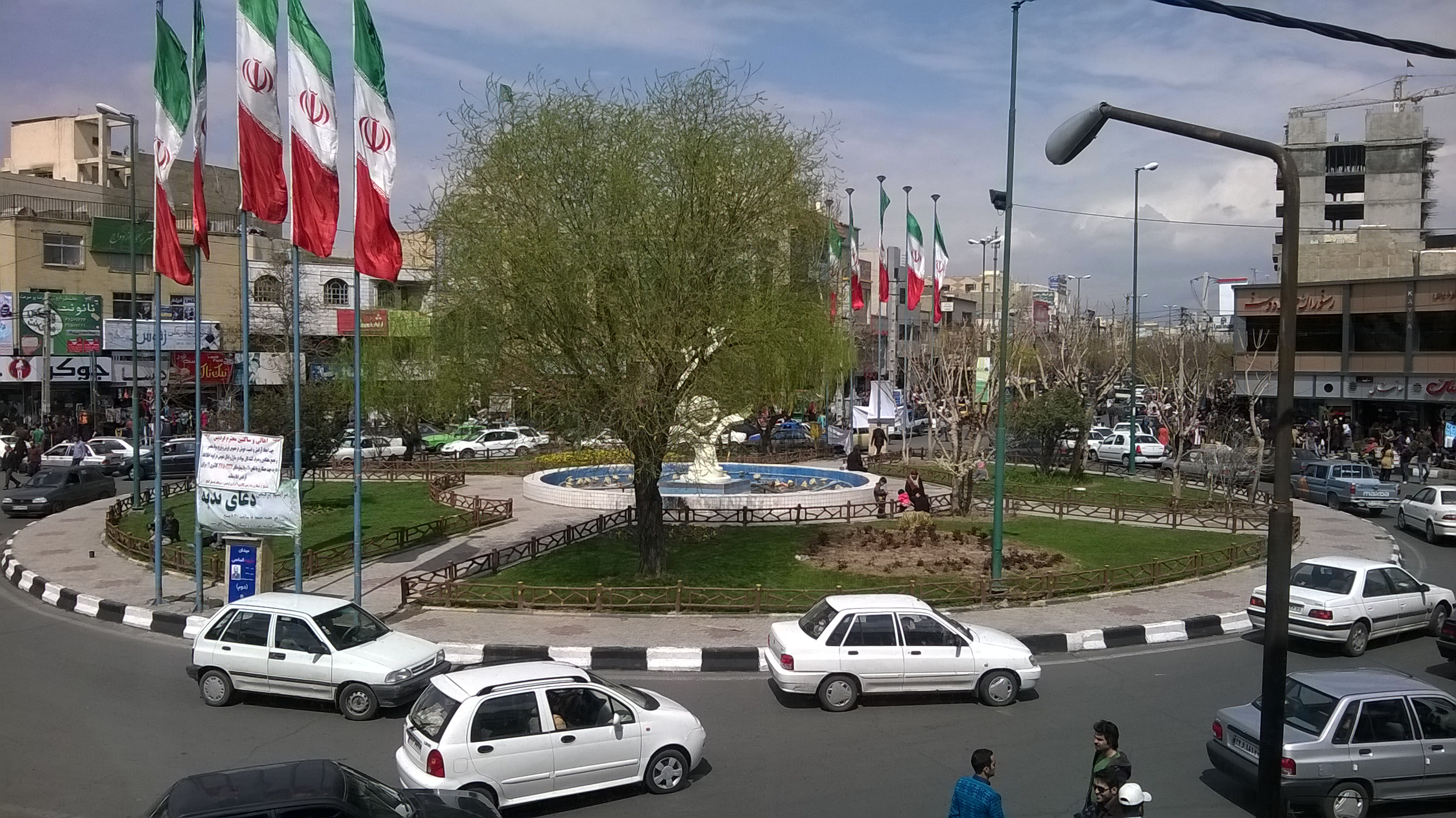
- Second Square in Fardis

- Location within Iran
- Coordinates: 35°43′51″N 50°58′55″E
- Country: Iran
- Province: Alborz
- County: Fardis
- District: Central
- Established as a city: 2013

Population (2016)
  - Urban: 181,174
- Time zone: UTC+3:30 (IRST)
- Area code: 026 (36)

Fardis (Persian: فردیس) (Note: Formerly the Fardis neighborhood in the city of Karaj) is a city in the Central District of Fardis County, Alborz province, Iran, serving as capital of both the county and the district.

== History ==
In 2010, Karaj County was separated from Tehran province in the establishment of Alborz province.

In 2013, the city of Meshkin Dasht, the Fardis neighborhood (Note: Became the city of Fardis) in the city of Karaj, and other parts of the county were separated from it in establishing Fardis County. The neighborhood was elevated to city status as Fardis and transferred to the new Central District as the county's capital.

== Demographics ==
=== Population ===
At the time of the 2016 National Census, the city's population was 181,174 people in 58,953 households.

== 2026 Iran massacres ==
During the 2026 Iran massacres, Erfan Soltani, a 26-year-old resident of Fardis, was arrested in his home on 8 January 2026, during ongoing anti-government protests in Iran. Following Soltani's arrest, several reports said he was refused any legal representation and was not given a trial before his sentence was decided. He was sentenced to death by Iranian authorities for "waging war against God" (Persian: محاربه, romanized: moharebeh), a capital offense under Iranian law. On 14 January 2026, the Iranian judiciary refuted the allegations, stating Soltani was charged with "colluding against national security" and "propaganda activities against the establishment," offenses which are not punishable by the death penalty in Iran. On 15 January 2026, Erfan Soltani's family said prison authorities informed them that his execution had been postponed. International media and human rights organisations have cited Soltani as an example of the Iranian authorities' handling of detainees during the January 2026 nationwide protests.

According to reports, on January 8, 2026 a massacre occurred in Fardis, where troops reportedly killed 50 protesters with a machine gun.
