= Meshkin Dasht =

City in Alborz province, Iran

Meshkin Dasht Persian: مشکین‌دشت
- City
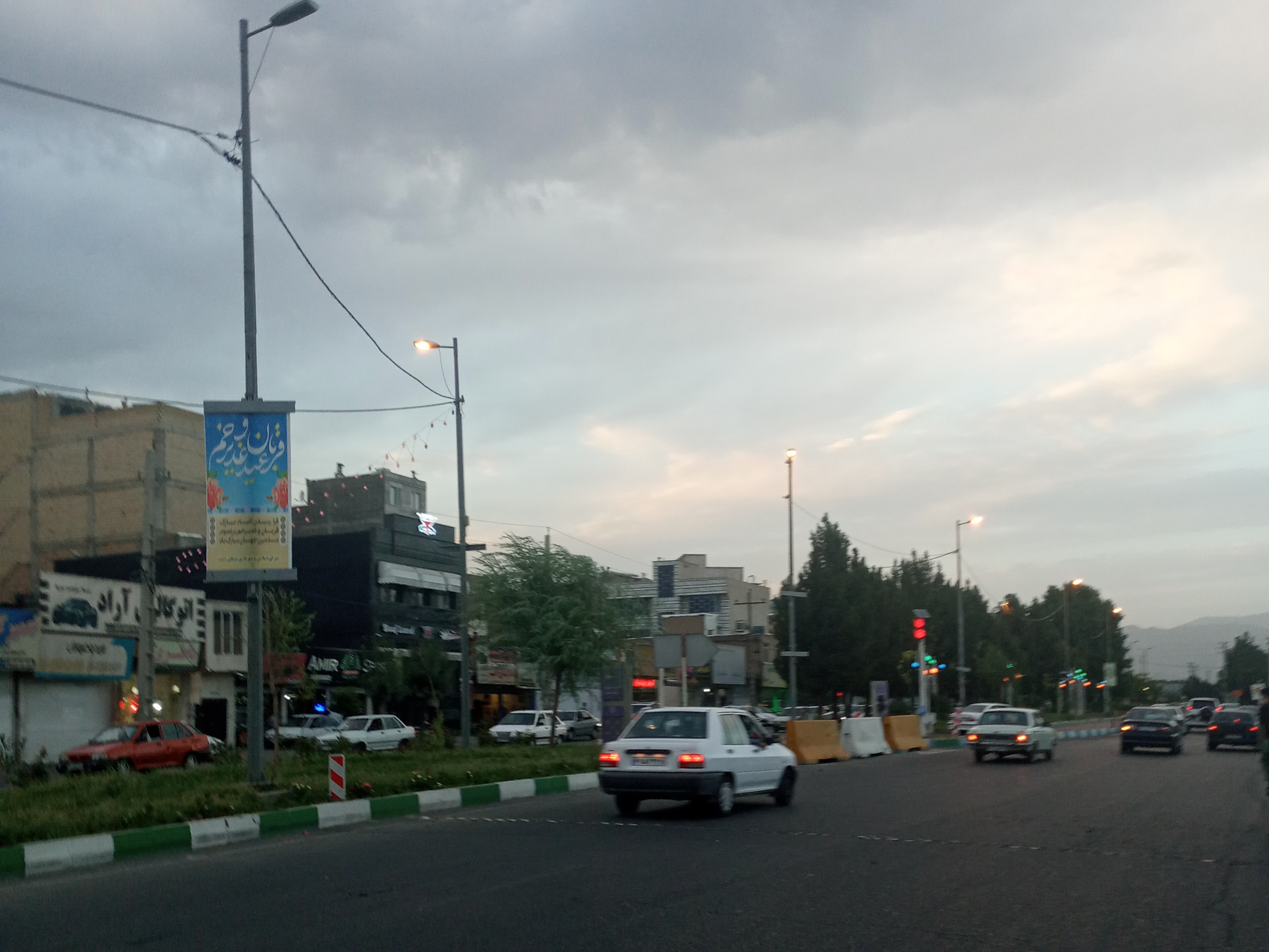

- Location within Iran
- Coordinates: 35°45′05″N 50°56′23″E
- Country: Iran
- Province: Alborz
- County: Fardis
- District: Meshkin Dasht
- Established as a city: 1996

Population (2016)
  - Total: 62,005
- Time zone: UTC+3:30 (IRST)

Meshkin Dasht (Persian: مشکین‌دشت) (Note: Also romanized as Meshkīn Dasht; formerly the village of Meshkinabad (مشکین‌آباد)) is a city in, and the capital of, Meshkin Dasht District in Fardis County, Alborz province, Iran. The village of Meshkinabad was converted to the city of Meshkin Dasht in 1996.

== Demographics ==
=== Population ===
At the time of the 2006 National Census, the city's population was 43,696 in 11,171 households, when it was in the Central District of Karaj County, Tehran province. In 2010, the county was separated from the province in the establishment of Alborz province. In 2013, the city was separated from the county in establishing Fardis County and was transferred to the new Meshkin Dasht District. The 2016 census measured the population of Meshkin Dasht as 62,005 in 18,644 households.
