= Central District (Karaj County) =

District in Alborz province, Iran

Central District (Karaj County) Persian: بخش مرکزی شهرستان کرج
- District
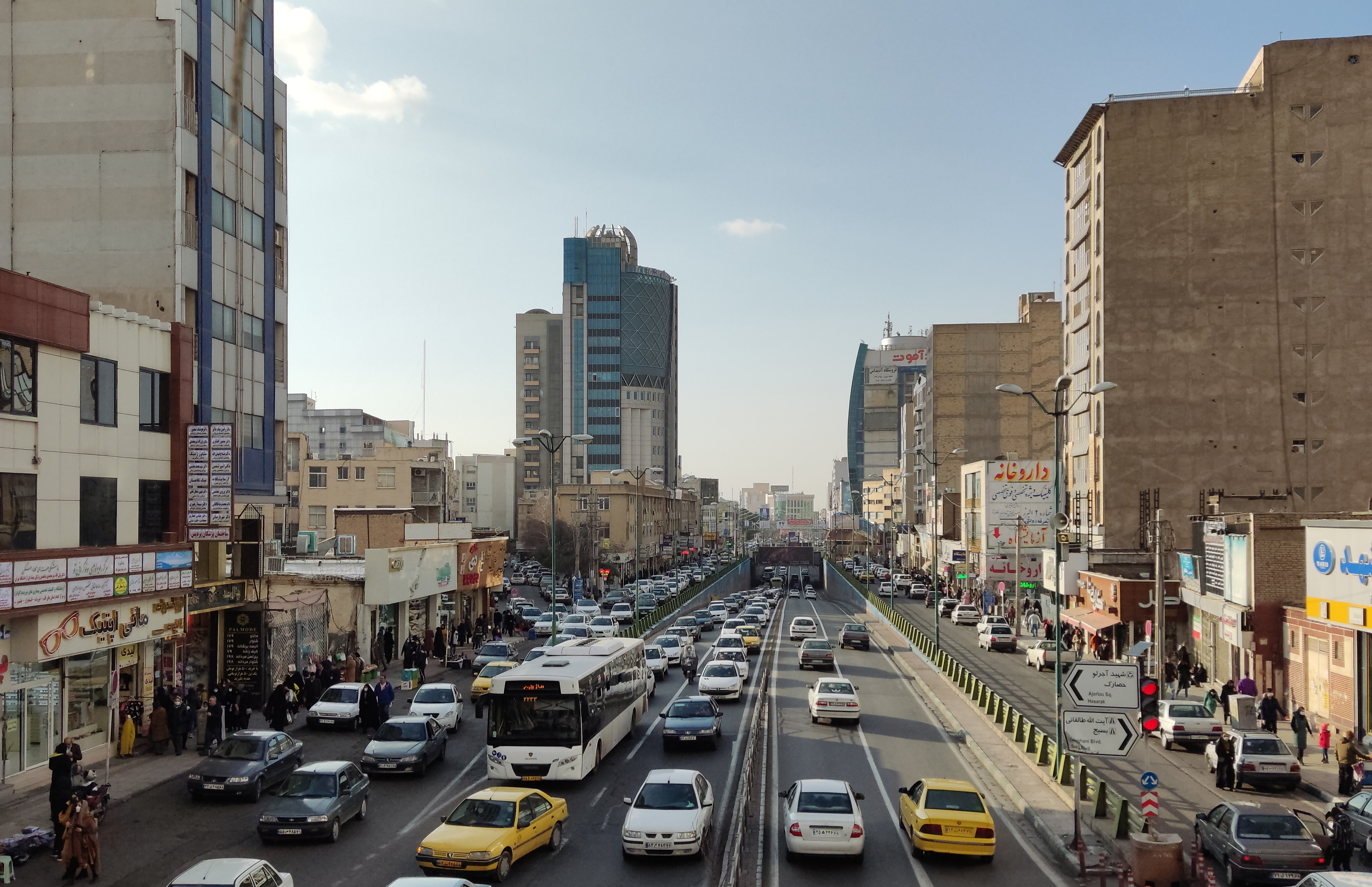
- Beheshti Street in the city of Karaj

- Location within Iran
- Coordinates: 35°51′N 50°56′E
- Country: Iran
- Province: Alborz
- County: Karaj
- Capital: Karaj

Population (2016)
  - Total: 1,956,267
- Time zone: UTC+3:30 (IRST)

The Central District of Karaj County (Persian: بخش مرکزی شهرستان کرج) is in Alborz province, Iran. Its capital is the city of Karaj.

== History ==
In 2010, the county was separated from Tehran province in the establishment of Alborz province. In 2013, the city of Meshkin Dasht, the Fardis neighborhood (Note: Became the city of Fardis) in the city of Karaj, and other parts of the district were separated from it in establishing Fardis County.

== Demographics ==
=== Population ===
At the time of the 2006 National Census, the district's population (as a part of Tehran province) was 1,667,024, in 460,242 households. The 2016 census measured the population of the district as 1,956,267 people in 617,773 households.

=== Administrative divisions ===
Central District (Karaj County) Population (Note: As a part of Tehran province at the 2006 census)
Administrative Divisions	2006	2016
Garmdarreh RD	544	221
Kamalabad RD	3,836	4,892
Mohammadabad RD	22,099	11,939
Garmdarreh (city)	12,738	22,726
Kamal Shahr (city)	80,435	141,669
Karaj (city)	1,377,450	1,592,492
Mahdasht (city)	43,100	62,910
Meshkin Dasht (city) (Note: Transferred to Fardis County)	43,696	
Mohammadshahr (city)	83,126	119,418
Total	1,667,024	1,956,267
RD = Rural District
