= Chendar =

Chendar or Chandar (Persian: چندار) may refer to:

- Chandar, Kohgiluyeh and Boyer-Ahmad, a village in Iran
- Chendar District, an administrative subdivision of Iran
- Kuhsar, capital of the previous
- Chendar Rural District, an administrative subdivision of Iran
- Chandar of Sindh, Brahmin ascetic who succeeded his brother, Chach of Alor, as king of Sindh
