= Imamzadeh Shahzadeh Hoseyn =

Village in Alborz province, Iran

Imamzadeh Shahzadeh Hoseyn Persian: امامزاده شاهزاده حسين
- Village
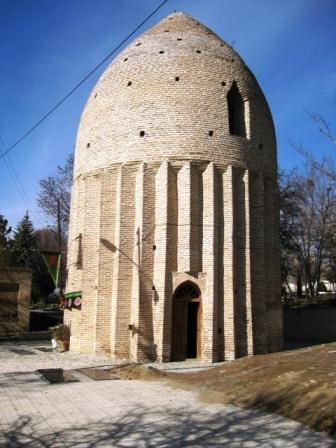
- The imamzadeh located in the village

- Location within Iran
- Country: Iran
- Province: Alborz
- County: Savojbolagh
- District: Chendar
- Rural District: Chendar

Population (2016)
  - Total: 0
- Time zone: UTC+3:30 (IRST)

Imamzadeh Shahzadeh Hoseyn (Persian: امامزاده شاهزاده حسين) (Note: Also romanized as Emāmzādeh Shāhzādeh Ḩoseyn; also known as Emāmzādeh Ḩoseyn) is a village in Chendar Rural District of Chendar District in Savojbolagh County, in the province of Alborz, Iran.

== Demographics ==
At the time of the 2006 National Census, the village's population was 118 in 32 households, when it was in Tehran province. The 2016 census measured the population of the village as zero, by which time the county had been separated from the province in the establishment of Alborz province.

== See also ==
- Alborz province
- Imamzadeh Hossein (Kordan)
