= Fashand (disambiguation) =

Fashand (Persian: فشند), or Pashand, is a village in Savojbolagh County, Alborz Province, Iran.

Fashand may also refer to:

- Fasham (Persian: فشم) also known as Facham, Fashand, and Pasham), a city in and the capital of Rudbar-e Qasran District, in Shemiranat County, Tehran Province, Iran
- Pashand, or Fashand, a village in Savajbolagh County, located in 75 km east of the Iranian capital of Tehran.
