= Khurvin =

Village in Alborz province, Iran

Khurvin Persian: خوروين
- Village
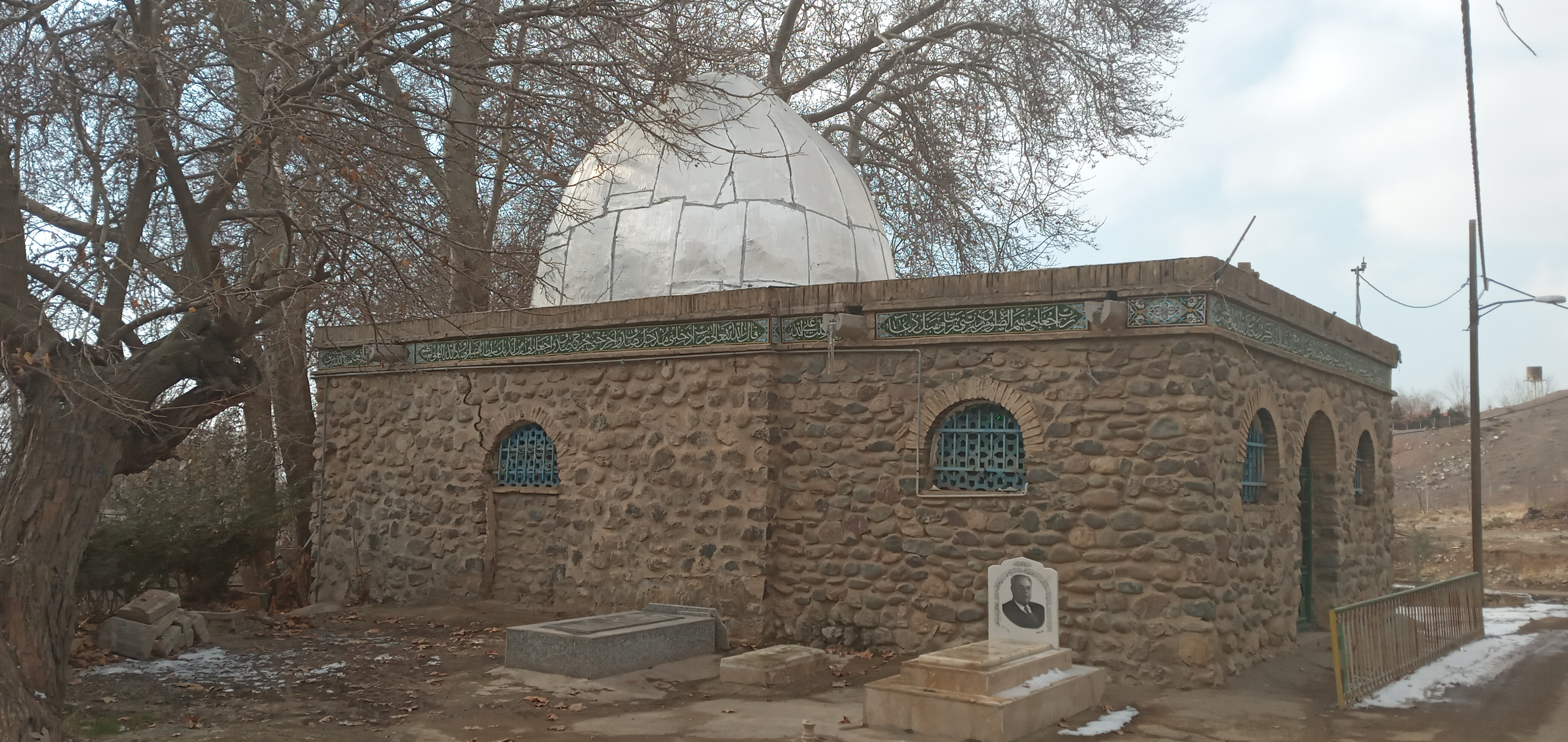
- Imamzadeh Musa

- Location within Iran
- Coordinates: 35°58′59″N 50°49′29″E
- Country: Iran
- Province: Alborz
- County: Savojbolagh
- District: Chendar
- Rural District: Chendar

Population (2016)
  - Total: 940
- Time zone: UTC+3:30 (IRST)

Khurvin (Persian: خوروين) (Note: Also romanized as Khowrvīn and Khūrvīn; also known as Khūrdīn and Khurūran) is a village in Chendar Rural District of Chendar District in Savojbolagh County, Alborz province, Iran.

== Demographics ==
=== Population ===
At the time of the 2006 National Census, the village's population was 866 in 261 households, when it was in Tehran province. The 2016 census measured the population of the village as 940 people in 325 households, by which time the county had been separated from the province in the establishment of Alborz province.

== Ganj Tape ==
Two ancient mounds named Ganj Tappeh and Siyah Tappeh are located near the village. The former of which is listed in the list of Iranian national heritage sites with the registration number 10827 on 22 January 2004.

== Gallery ==
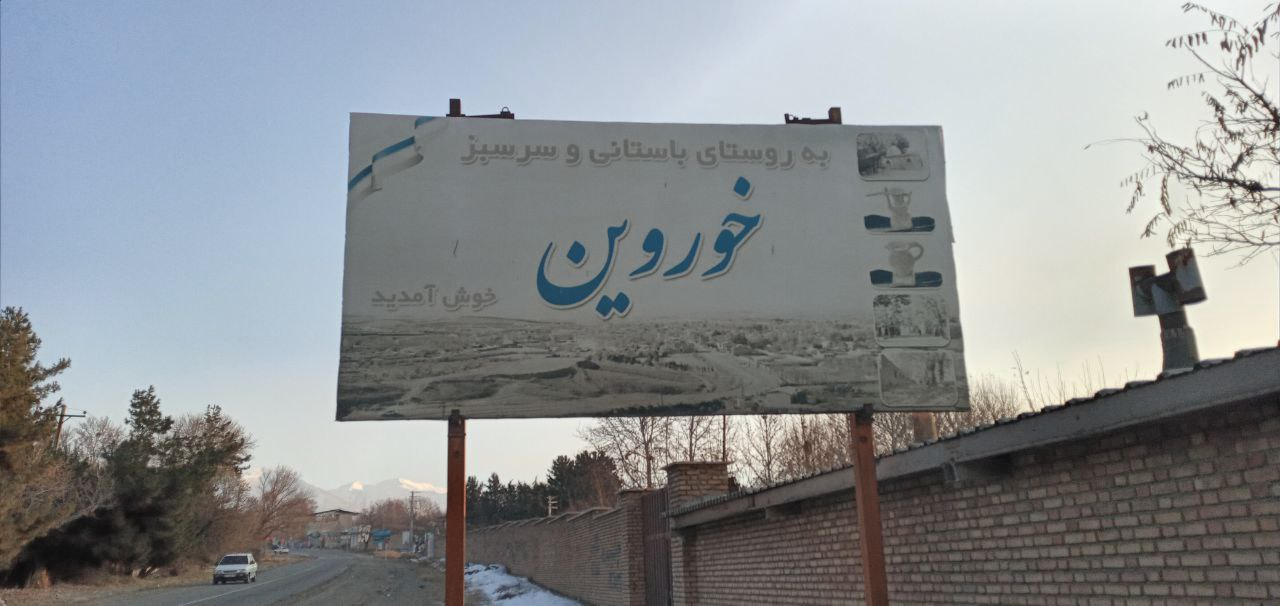

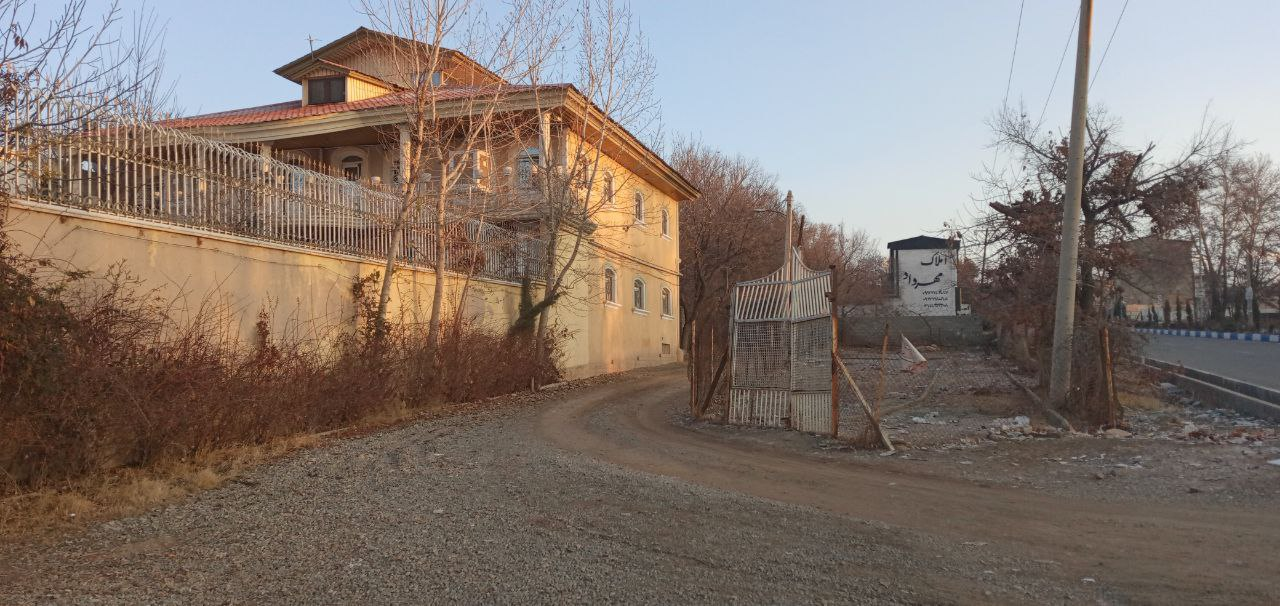

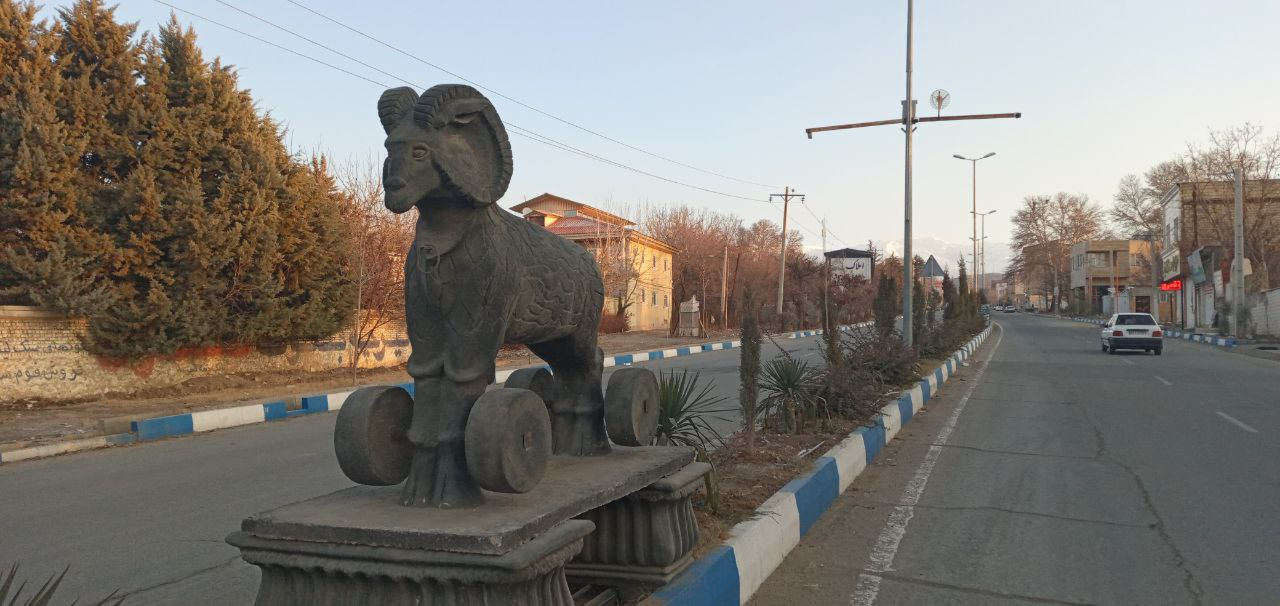
