= Barakan (surname) =

Barakan is a surname. Notable people with the surname include:

- Michael Barakan a.k.a. Shane Fontayne, English rock guitarist and audio engineer
- Peter Barakan, English DJ, broadcaster, and author; best known as the presenter for Begin Japanology

== See also ==
- Baraghan, a village in Iran
