= Sanj, Iran =

Sanj, Iran (Persian: سَنج) may refer to:

- Sanj, Alborz, a village in Alborz Province, Iran
- Sanj, Lorestan, a village in Lorestan Province, Iran
- Sanj, Qazvin, a village in Qazvin Province, Iran
