= Tekyeh Aghasht =

Village in Alborz province, Iran

Tekyeh Aghasht Persian: تكيه اغشت
- Village
- Location within Iran
- Coordinates: 35°59′03″N 50°51′28″E
- Country: Iran
- Province: Alborz
- County: Savojbolagh
- District: Chendar
- Rural District: Baraghan

Population (2016)
  - Total: 166
- Time zone: UTC+3:30 (IRST)

Tekyeh Aghasht (Persian: تكيه اغشت) (Note: Also romanized as Tekyeh Āghasht; also known as Takyeh and Tekyeh) is a village in Baraghan Rural District of Chendar District in Savojbolagh County, Alborz province, Iran.

== Demographics ==
=== Population ===
At the time of the 2006 National Census, the village's population was 29 in 13 households, when it was in Tehran province. The 2016 census measured the population of the village as 166 people in 54 households, by which time the county had been separated from the province in the establishment of Alborz province.
