= Banu Sahra =

Village in Alborz province, Iran

Banu Sahra Persian: بانوصحرا
- Village
- Location within Iran
- Coordinates: 35°56′53″N 50°49′15″E
- Country: Iran
- Province: Alborz
- County: Savojbolagh
- District: Chendar
- Rural District: Chendar

Population (2016)
  - Total: 532
- Time zone: UTC+3:30 (IRST)

Banu Sahra (Persian: بانوصحرا) (Note: Also romanized as Bānū Şaḩrā; also known as Bālsahra) is a village in Chendar Rural District of Chendar District in Savojbolagh County, Alborz province, Iran.

== Demographics ==
=== Population ===
At the time of the 2006 National Census, the village's population was 518 in 164 households, when it was in Tehran province. The 2016 census measured the population of the village as 532 people in 207 households, by which time the county had been separated from the province in the establishment of Alborz province.
