= Harjab =

Village in Alborz province, Iran

Harjab Persian: هرجاب
- Village
- Location within Iran
- Coordinates: 35°58′56″N 50°50′00″E
- Country: Iran
- Province: Alborz
- County: Savojbolagh
- District: Chendar
- Rural District: Chendar

Population (2016)
  - Total: 203
- Time zone: UTC+3:30 (IRST)

Harjab (Persian: هرجاب) (Note: Also romanized as Harjāb) is a village in Chendar Rural District of Chendar District in Savojbolagh County, Alborz province, Iran.

== Demographics ==
=== Population ===
At the time of the 2006 National Census, the village's population was 91 in 24 households, when it was in Tehran province. The 2016 census measured the population of the village as 203 people in 79 households, by which time the county had been separated from the province in the establishment of Alborz province.
