= Duz Anbar =

Village in Alborz province, Iran

Duz Anbar Persian: دوزعنبر
- Village
- Location within Iran
- Coordinates: 36°00′44″N 50°50′03″E
- Country: Iran
- Province: Alborz
- County: Savojbolagh
- District: Chendar
- Rural District: Chendar

Population (2016)
  - Total: 116
- Time zone: UTC+3:30 (IRST)

Duz Anbar (Persian: دوزعنبر) (Note: Also romanized as Dūz ‘Anbar) is a village in Chendar Rural District of Chendar District in Savojbolagh County, Alborz province, Iran.

== Demographics ==
=== Population ===
At the time of the 2006 National Census, the village's population was 141 in 47 households, when it was in Tehran province. The 2016 census measured the population of the village as 316 people in 107 households, by which time the county had been separated from the province in the establishment of Alborz province.
