= Ardaheh =

Village in Alborz province, Iran

Ardaheh Persian: اردهه
- Village
- Location within Iran
- Coordinates: 36°01′12″N 50°47′01″E
- Country: Iran
- Province: Alborz
- County: Savojbolagh
- District: Chendar
- Rural District: Chendar

Population (2016)
  - Total: 714
- Time zone: UTC+3:30 (IRST)

Ardaheh (Persian: اردهه) (Note: Also romanized as Ārdaheh) is a village in Chendar Rural District of Chendar District in Savojbolagh County, Alborz province, Iran.

== Demographics ==
=== Population ===
At the time of the 2006 National Census, the village's population was 694 in 207 households, when it was in Tehran province. The 2016 census measured the population of the village as 714 people in 241 households, by which time the county had been separated from the province in the establishment of Alborz province.
