= Sorheh =

Village in Alborz province, Iran

Sorheh Persian: سرحه
- Village
- Location within Iran
- Coordinates: 35°58′30″N 50°56′53″E
- Country: Iran
- Province: Alborz
- County: Savojbolagh
- District: Chendar
- Rural District: Baraghan

Population (2016)
  - Total: 301
- Time zone: UTC+3:30 (IRST)

Sorheh (Persian: سرحه) is a village in Baraghan Rural District of Chendar District in Savojbolagh County, Alborz province, Iran.

== Demographics ==
=== Population ===
At the time of the 2006 National Census, the village's population was 122, in 44 households, when it was in Tehran province. The 2016 census measured the population of the village as 301 people in 114 households, by which time the county had been separated from the province in the establishment of Alborz province.
