= Sibandarreh =

Village in Alborz province, Iran

Sibandarreh Persian: سيبان دره
- Village
- Location within Iran
- Coordinates: 36°01′30″N 50°56′10″E
- Country: Iran
- Province: Alborz
- County: Savojbolagh
- District: Chendar
- Rural District: Baraghan

Population (2016)
  - Total: 324
- Time zone: UTC+3:30 (IRST)

Sibandarreh (Persian: سيبان دره) (Note: Also romanized as Sībāndarreh) is a village in Baraghan Rural District of Chendar District in Savojbolagh County, Alborz province, Iran.

== Demographics ==
=== Population ===
At the time of the 2006 National Census, the village's population was 72, in 27 households, when it was in Tehran province. The 2016 census measured the population of the village as 324 people in 111 households, by which time the county had been separated from the province in the establishment of Alborz province.
