= Talian =

Talian may refer to:

== Places ==
- Talian, Iran, a village in Tehran province, Iran
- Dhok Talian, a village in Punjab, Pakistan

== People ==
- Jozef Talian (born 1985), Slovak footballer

== Other uses ==
- Talian dialect, a Venetian dialect spoken in Brazil

== See also ==
- Talion (disambiguation)
