= Kolaleh Chin =

Village in Alborz province, Iran

Kolaleh Chin Persian: كلاله چين
- Village
- Country: Iran
- Province: Alborz
- County: Savojbolagh
- District: Chendar
- Rural District: Chendar

Population (2016)
  - Total: Below reporting threshold
- Time zone: UTC+3:30 (IRST)

Kolaleh Chin (Persian: كلاله چين) (Note: Also romanized as Kolāleh Chīn) is a village in Chendar Rural District of Chendar District in Savojbolagh County, Alborz province, Iran.

== Demographics ==
=== Population ===
At the time of the 2006 National Census, the village's population was 64 in 19 households, when it was in Tehran province. The 2016 census measured the population of the village as below the reporting threshold, by which time the county had been separated from the province in the establishment of Alborz province.
