= Vamkuh =

Village in Alborz province, Iran

Vamkuh Persian: وامكوه
- Village
- Location within Iran
- Coordinates: 36°00′26″N 50°58′01″E
- Country: Iran
- Province: Alborz
- County: Savojbolagh
- District: Chendar
- Rural District: Baraghan

Population (2016)
  - Total: 104
- Time zone: UTC+3:30 (IRST)

Vamkuh (Persian: وامكوه) (Note: Also romanized as Vāmḵūh) is a village in Baraghan Rural District of Chendar District in Savojbolagh County, Alborz province, Iran.

== Demographics ==
=== Population ===
At the time of the 2006 National Census, the village's population was 12 in six households, when it was in Tehran province. The 2016 census measured the population of the village as 104 people in 40 households, by which time the county had been separated from the province in the establishment of Alborz province.
