= Ajin Dojin =

Village in Alborz province, Iran

Ajin Dojin Persian: اجين دوجين
- Village
- Location within Iran
- Coordinates: 36°00′15″N 50°50′00″E
- Country: Iran
- Province: Alborz
- County: Savojbolagh
- District: Chendar
- Rural District: Chendar

Population (2016)
  - Total: 951
- Time zone: UTC+3:30 (IRST)

Ajin Dojin (Persian: اجين دوجين) (Note: Also romanized as Ājīn Dojīn) is a village in Chendar Rural District of Chendar District in Savojbolagh County, Alborz province, Iran.

== Demographics ==
The village is populated by Tâts and their language is Tâti (Tâti Zobun).

== Population ==
At the time of the 2006 National Census, the village's population was 578 in 174 households, when it was in Tehran province. The 2016 census measured the population of the village as 951 people in 320 households, by which time the county had been separated from the province in the establishment of Alborz province.
