= Hasanabad, Savojbolagh =

Village in Alborz province, Iran

Hasanabad Persian: حسن‌آباد
- Village
- Location within Iran
- Country: Iran
- Province: Alborz
- County: Savojbolagh
- District: Chendar
- Rural District: Baraghan

Population (2016)
  - Total: 24
- Time zone: UTC+3:30 (IRST)

Hasanabad (Persian: حسن‌آباد) (Note: Also romanized as Ḩasanābād) is a village in Baraghan Rural District of Chendar District in Savojbolagh County, Alborz province, Iran.

== Demographics ==
=== Population ===
At the time of the 2006 National Census, the village's population was 30 in 11 households, when it was in Tehran province. The 2016 census measured the population of the village as 24 people in 13 households, by which time the county had been separated from the province in the establishment of Alborz province.
