= Siah Karan =

Village in Alborz province, Iran

Siah Karan Persian: سياه كران
- Village
- Location within Iran
- Coordinates: 35°57′26″N 50°52′29″E
- Country: Iran
- Province: Alborz
- County: Savojbolagh
- District: Chendar
- Rural District: Baraghan

Population (2016)
  - Total: 184
- Time zone: UTC+3:30 (IRST)

Siah Karan (Persian: سياه كران) (Note: Also romanized as Sīāh Karān) is a village in Baraghan Rural District of Chendar District in Savojbolagh County, Alborz province, Iran.

== Demographics ==
=== Population ===
At the time of the 2006 National Census, the village's population was 32 in 10 households, when it was in Tehran province. The 2016 census measured the population of the village as 184 people in 74 households, by which time the county had been separated from the province in the establishment of Alborz province.
