= Aznaq =

Village in Alborz province, Iran

Aznaq Persian: ازنق
- Village
- Location within Iran
- Coordinates: 35°58′30″N 50°49′06″E
- Country: Iran
- Province: Alborz
- County: Savojbolagh
- District: Chendar
- Rural District: Chendar

Population (2016)
  - Total: 251
- Time zone: UTC+3:30 (IRST)

Aznaq (Persian: ازنق) is a village in Chendar Rural District of Chendar District in Savojbolagh County, Alborz province, Iran.

== Demographics ==
=== Population ===
At the time of the 2006 National Census, the village's population was 271 in 84 households, when it was in Tehran province. The 2016 census measured the population of the village as 251 people in 117 households, by which time the county had been separated from the province in the establishment of Alborz province.
