= Sefid Aran =

Village in Alborz province, Iran

Sefid Aran Persian: سفيداران
- Village
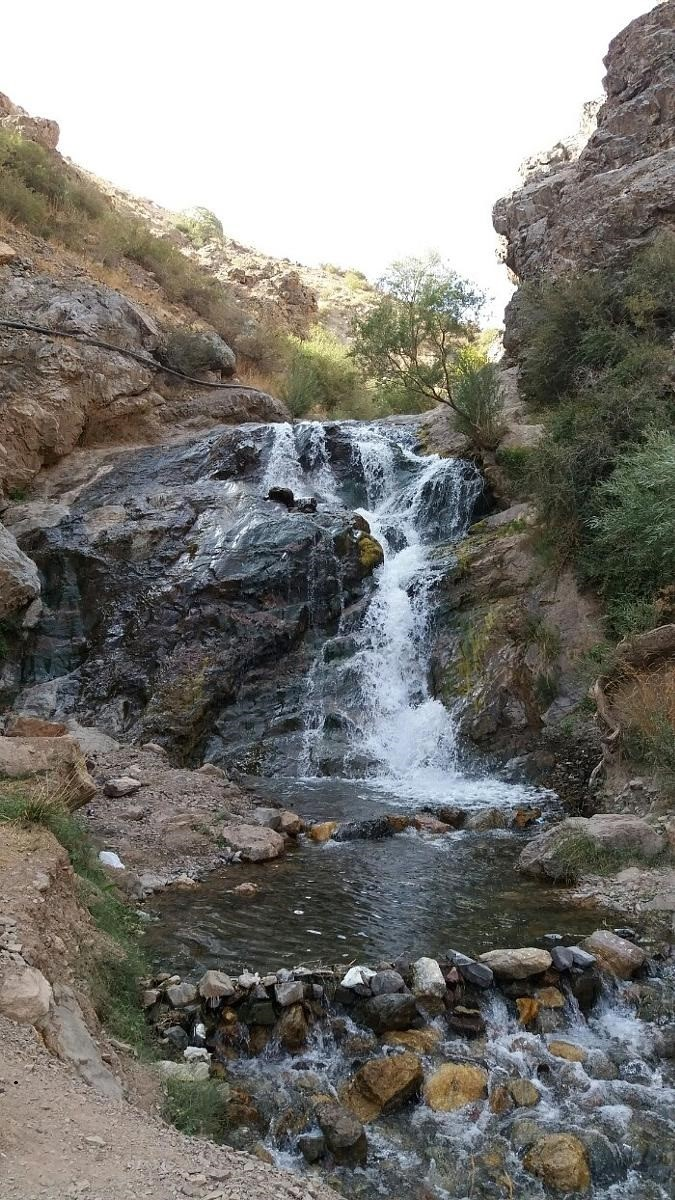
- First waterfall in Sefid Aran village

- Location within Iran
- Coordinates: 36°03′13″N 50°52′02″E
- Country: Iran
- Province: Alborz
- County: Savojbolagh
- District: Chendar
- Rural District: Chendar

Population (2016)
  - Total: 132
- Time zone: UTC+3:30 (IRST)

Sefid Aran (Persian: سفيداران) (Note: Also romanized as Sefīd Ārān; also known as Asfīdārān) is a village in Chendar Rural District of Chendar District in Savojbolagh County, Alborz province, Iran.

== Demographics ==
=== Population ===
At the time of the 2006 National Census, the village's population was 32 in 14 households, when it was in Tehran province. The 2016 census measured the population of the village as 132 people in 47 households, by which time the county had been separated from the province in the establishment of Alborz province.

== Etymology ==
The word sefid means "white," and the word aran means "trees."

== Tourism ==
The three Juzehrud Waterfalls (جوزه رود, also romanized as Jōse Rood) are located in Sefid Aran village.

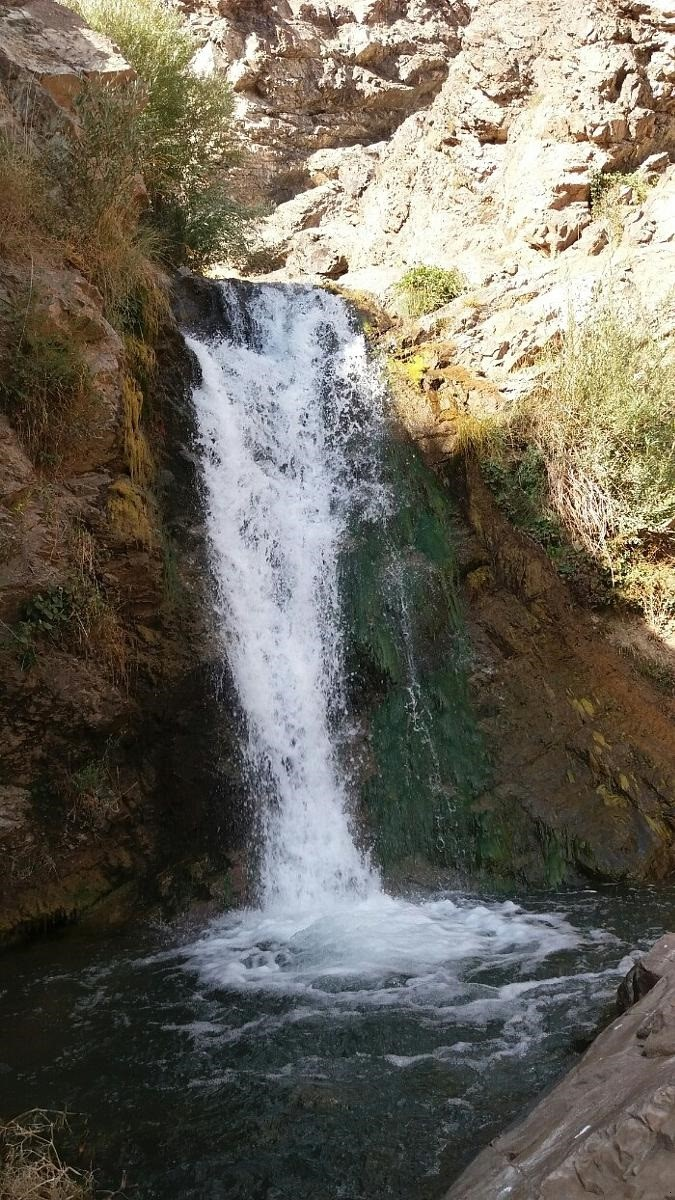
Jose Rood Waterfalls
