= Shendeh =

Village in Alborz province, Iran

Shendeh Persian: شنده
- Village
- Location within Iran
- Coordinates: 35°58′58″N 50°47′40″E
- Country: Iran
- Province: Alborz
- County: Savojbolagh
- District: Chendar
- Rural District: Chendar

Population (2016)
  - Total: 453
- Time zone: UTC+3:30 (IRST)

Shendeh (Persian: شنده) is a village in Chendar Rural District of Chendar District in Savojbolagh County, Alborz province, Iran.

== Demographics ==
=== Population ===
At the time of the 2006 National Census, the village's population was 970 in 280 households, when it was in Tehran province. The 2016 census measured the population of the village as 453 people in 200 households, by which time the county had been separated from the province in the establishment of Alborz province.
