= Valian, Alborz =

Village in Alborz province, Iran

Valian Persian: وليان
- Village
- Location within Iran
- Coordinates: 36°01′14″N 50°50′34″E
- Country: Iran
- Province: Alborz
- County: Savojbolagh
- District: Chendar
- Rural District: Chendar

Population (2016)
  - Total: 1,420
- Time zone: UTC+3:30 (IRST)

Valian (Persian: وليان) (Note: Also romanized as Valīān, Valiyan, Veleyan, and Velīān; also known as Vīlau and Viliān) is a village in Chendar Rural District of Chendar District in Savojbolagh County, Alborz province, Iran.

== Demographics ==
=== Population ===
At the time of the 2006 National Census, the village's population was 1,122 in 355 households, when it was in Tehran province. The 2016 census measured the population of the village as 1,420 people in 469 households, by which time the county had been separated from the province in the establishment of Alborz province.
