= Alaqeh Band =

Village in Alborz province, Iran

Alaqeh Band Persian: علاقه بند
- Village
- Location within Iran
- Coordinates: 35°57′23″N 50°53′03″E
- Country: Iran
- Province: Alborz
- County: Savojbolagh
- District: Chendar
- Rural District: Baraghan

Population (2016)
  - Total: 298
- Time zone: UTC+3:30 (IRST)

Alaqeh Band (Persian: علاقه بند) (Note: Also romanized as ‘Alāqeh Band; also known as Alaqeband and ‘Alāqeband) is a village in Baraghan Rural District of Chendar District in Savojbolagh County, Alborz province, Iran.

== Demographics ==
=== Population ===
At the time of the 2006 National Census, the village's population was 42 in 16 households, when it was in Tehran province. The 2016 census measured the population of the village as 298 people in 96 households, by which time the county had been separated from the province in the establishment of Alborz province.
