= Kalachi =

Kalachi may refer to:

- Kalachi, Kazakhstan
- An alternative romanisation for Qalaychi, Zanjan
- Kalachi (novel), novel by K. R. Meera

== See also ==
- Baghban Kalachi
