= Askul Darreh =

Village in Alborz province, Iran

Askul Darreh Persian: اسكول دره
- Village
- Location within Iran
- Country: Iran
- Province: Alborz
- County: Savojbolagh
- District: Chendar
- Rural District: Chendar

Population (2016)
  - Total: 179
- Time zone: UTC+3:30 (IRST)

Askul Darreh (Persian: اسكول دره) (Note: Also romanized as Āsḵūl Darreh) is a village in Chendar Rural District of Chendar District in Savojbolagh County, Alborz province, Iran.

== Demographics ==
=== Population ===
At the time of the 2006 National Census, the village's population was 17 people in seven households, when it was part of Tehran province. The 2016 census recorded a population of 179 people in 57 households, by which time the county had been separated from the province and incorporated into the newly established Alborz province.
