= Sibestan =

Village in Alborz province, Iran

Sibestan Persian: سيبستان
- Village
- Location within Iran
- Coordinates: 36°02′48″N 50°48′44″E
- Country: Iran
- Province: Alborz
- County: Savojbolagh
- District: Chendar
- Rural District: Chendar

Population (2016)
  - Total: 0
- Time zone: UTC+3:30 (IRST)

Sibestan (Persian: سيبستان) (Note: Also romanized as Sībestān) is a village in Chendar Rural District of Chendar District in Savojbolagh County, Alborz province, Iran.

== Demographics ==
=== Population ===
At the time of the 2006 National Census, the village's population was 179 in 47 households, when it was in Tehran province. The 2016 census measured the population of the village as zero, by which time the county had been separated from the province in the establishment of Alborz province.
