= Aminabad, Alborz =

Village in Alborz province, Iran

Aminabad Persian: امين اباد
- Village
- Location within Iran
- Coordinates: 35°57′26″N 50°54′40″E
- Country: Iran
- Province: Alborz
- County: Savojbolagh
- District: Chendar
- Rural District: Baraghan

Population (2016)
  - Total: 15
- Time zone: UTC+3:30 (IRST)

Aminabad (Persian: امين اباد) (Note: Also romanized as Amīnābād) is a village in Baraghan Rural District of Chendar District in Savojbolagh County, Alborz province, Iran.

== Demographics ==
=== Population ===
At the time of the 2006 National Census, the village's population was 37, in eight households, when it was in Tehran province. The 2016 census measured the population of the village as 15 people in 10 households, by which time the county had been separated from the province in the establishment of Alborz province.
