= Kordan, Alborz =

Village in Alborz province, Iran

Kordan Persian: كردان
- Village
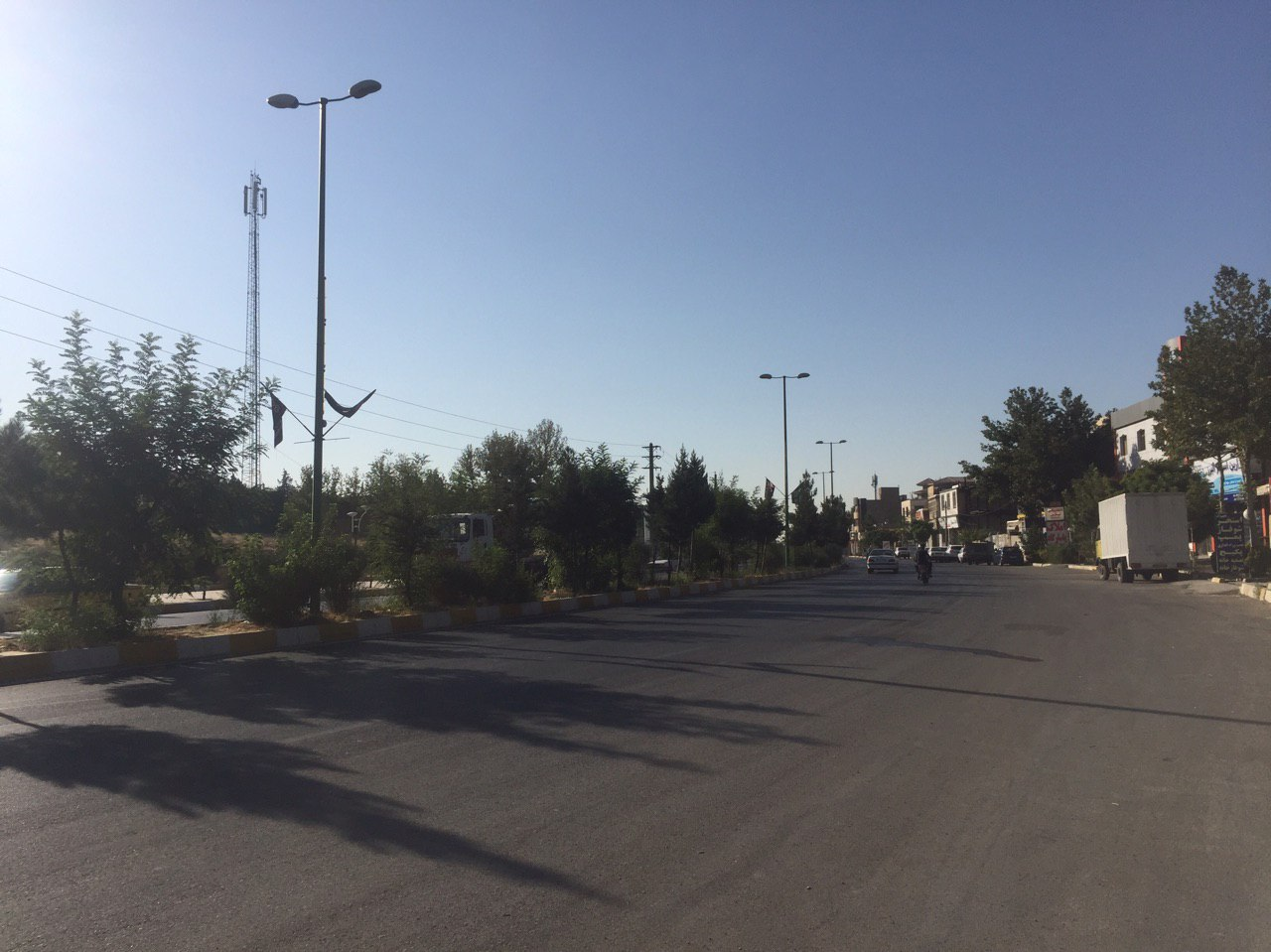
- Kordan's main street

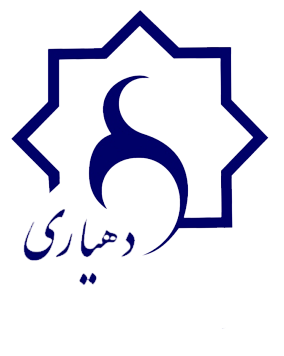
- Seal

- Location within Iran
- Coordinates: 35°56′06″N 50°49′39″E
- Country: Iran
- Province: Alborz
- County: Savojbolagh
- District: Chendar
- Rural District: Chendar

Government
  - Mayor: Reza Modirzare

Area
  - Total: 10.49 km^{2} (4.05 sq mi)

Population (2016)
  - Total: 3,795
  - Density: 361.8/km^{2} (937.0/sq mi)
- Time zone: UTC+3:30 (IRST)
- Telephone code: 026
- Vehicle registration: I.R 21/38/68/78/30
- Website: kordanvillage.com

Kordan (Persian: كردان) (Note: Also romanized as Kordān; also known as Kurdan) is a village in Chendar Rural District of Chendar District in Savojbolagh County, Alborz province, Iran.

== Demographics ==
=== Population ===
At the time of the 2006 National Census, the village's population was 3,697 in 1,018 households, when it was in Tehran province. The 2016 census measured the population of the village as 3,795 people in 1,150 households, by which time the county had been separated from the province in the establishment of Alborz province. It was the most populous village in its rural district.

== Historical and natural attractions ==
- Kordan mosque
- Kordan Police station
- Shahzade Hossein Shrine
- Sharbanoo Shrine
- Isar sport Complex
- Sangesoo mountain
- Barekat Road
- Kordan Islamic council
- Soleimani slaughter-house
- Kordan duct and river
- Horsemanship

== Sports fields ==
Mountaineering : Kordan area has suitable mountain connected from east to Talaghan and north to Karaj city. Sangeso is one of mountaineering team in Kordan village.

(horse) riding : It's the traditional sport in Kordan. athletes develop many sorts of horses. There are horse trading and horse keeping in horse riding club. There are more than 15 horse riding club in Kordan village.

Aviation : Mehr is first aviation club in Kordan village.

== Religious attractions ==
Imamzadeh Hossein (/huːˈseɪn/; Arabic: حُسَين Ḥusayn) : It was built in 10th century CE and is located in the Kordan cemetery. The shrine has a wooden door, the front of which is decorated with calligraphy.

Kordan Mosque : Not an old mosque. It has 2 out doors,1 elevator, and 2 indoors. Most pilgrims and mourners prepare food and give them to people in Ashura (Arabic: عاشوراء ʻĀshūrā') and Tasu'a events in that shrine.

== Gallery ==
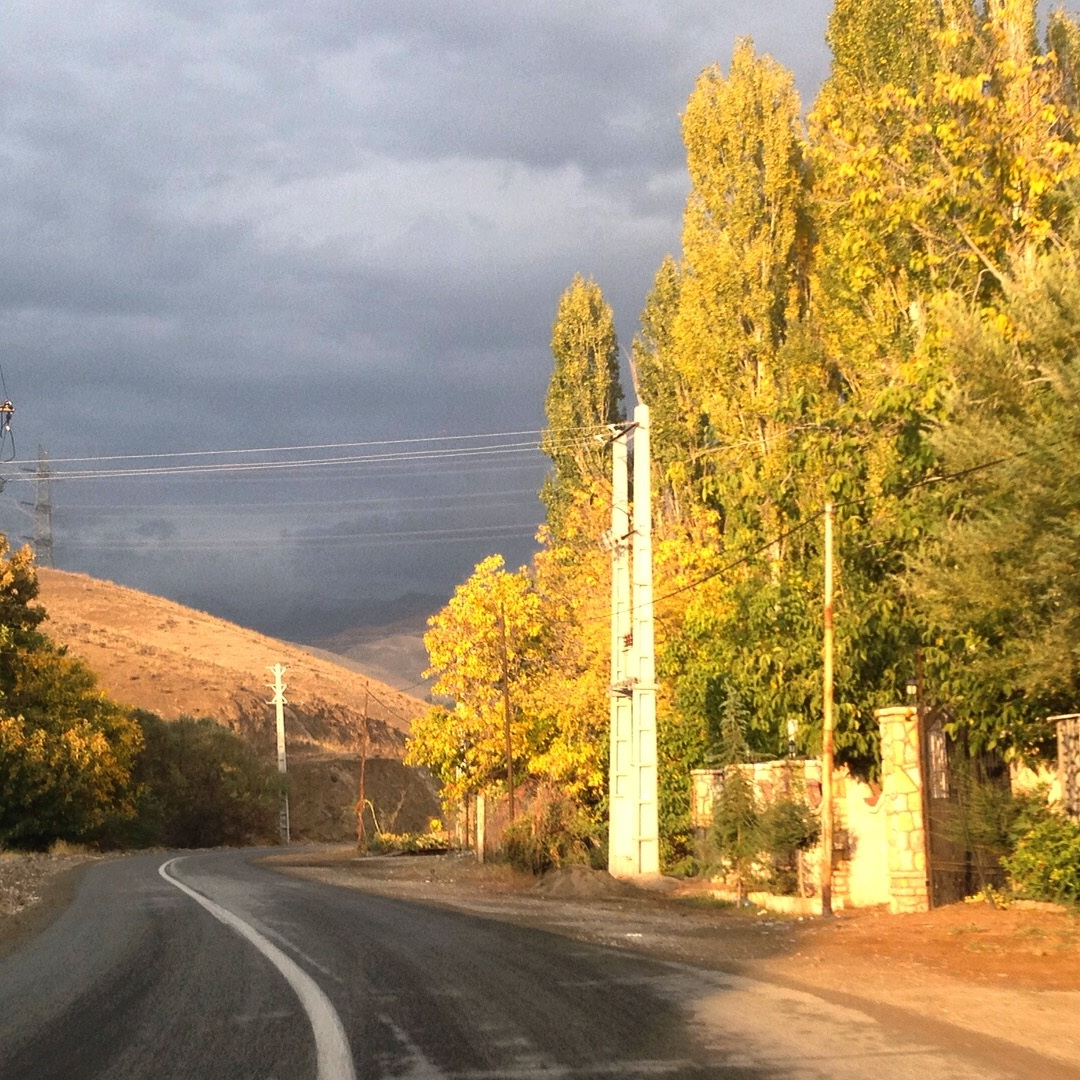
Road

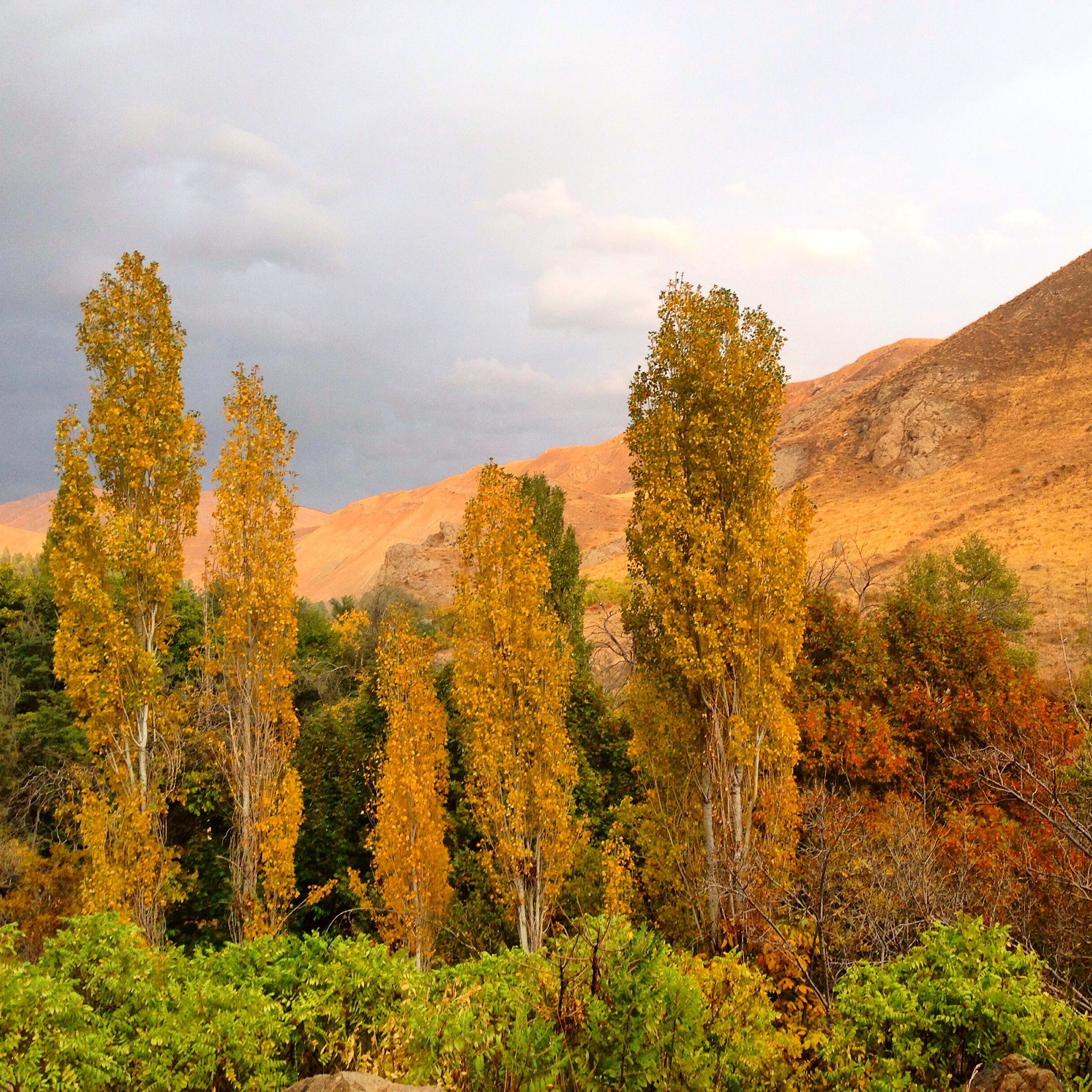
Trees

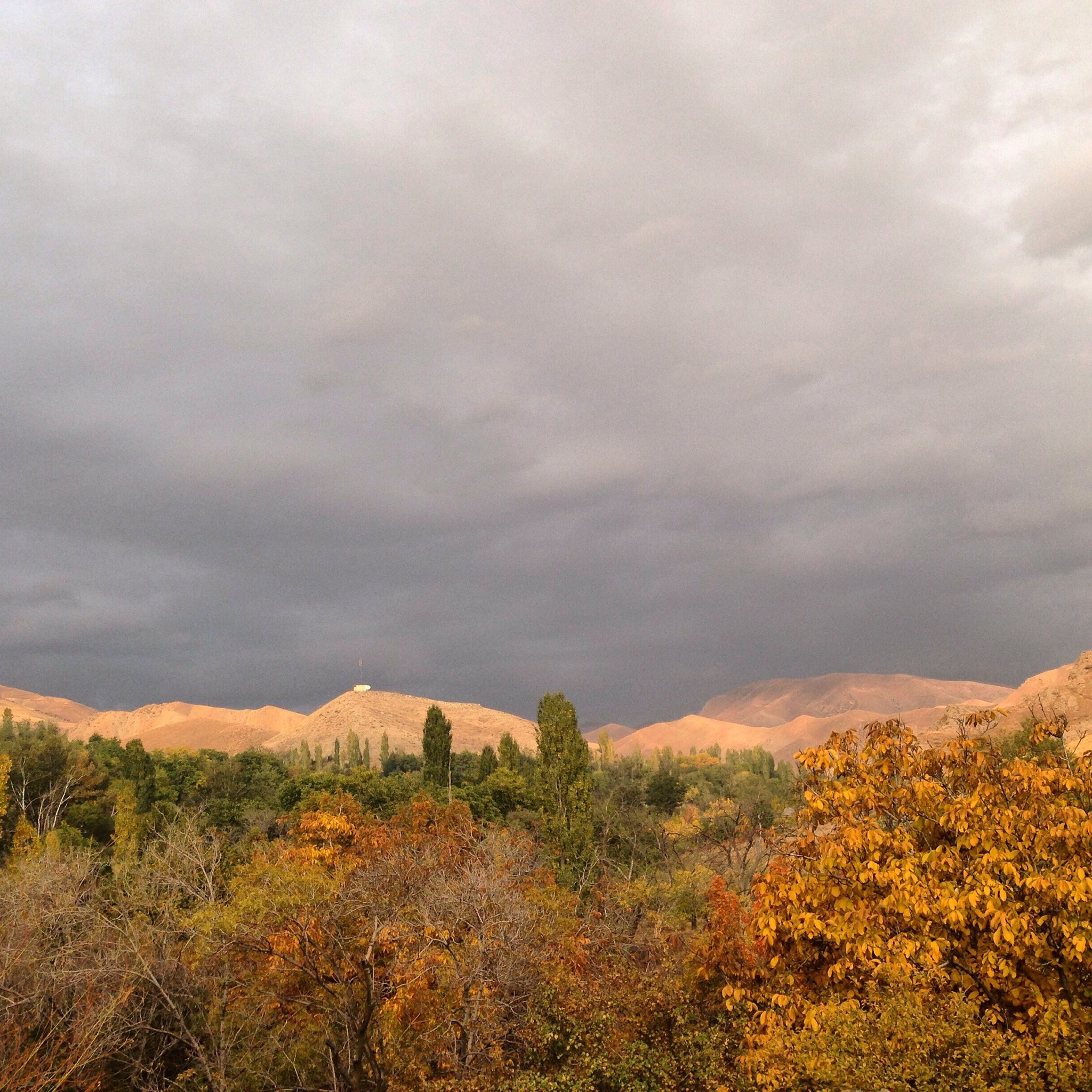
Nature

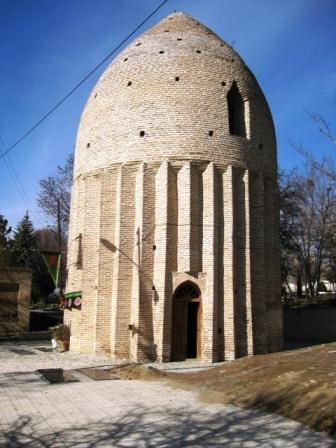
Imamzadeh Hossein
