= Kalinrud =

Village in Alborz province, Iran

Kalinrud Persian: كلين رود
- Village
- Location within Iran
- Country: Iran
- Province: Alborz
- County: Savojbolagh
- District: Chendar
- Rural District: Chendar

Population (2016)
  - Total: 306
- Time zone: UTC+3:30 (IRST)

Kalinrud (Persian: كلين رود) (Note: Also romanized as Kalīnrūd) is a village in Chendar Rural District of Chendar District in Savojbolagh County, Alborz province, Iran.

== Demographics ==
=== Population ===
At the time of the 2006 National Census, the village's population was 147 in 71 households, when it was in Tehran province. The 2016 census measured the population of the village as 306 people in 103 households, by which time the county had been separated from the province in the establishment of Alborz province.
