= Sirud =

Sirud and Sehrud (Persian: سيرود) may refer to:

- Sirud, Alborz
- Sirud, Mazandaran
