= Vardeh, Alborz =

Village in Alborz province, Iran

Vardeh Persian: ورده
- Village
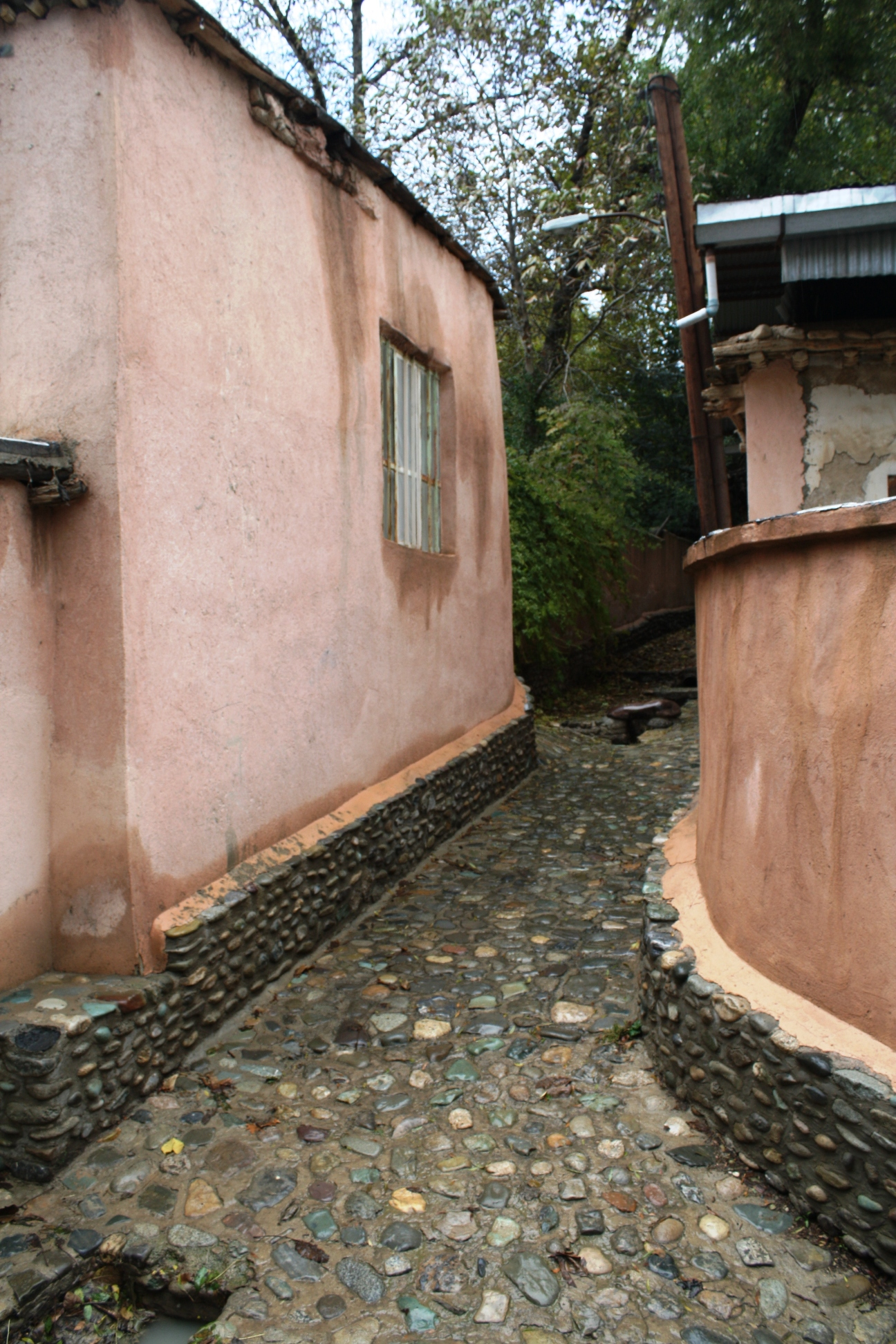
- Houses in rural Vardeh

- Location within Iran
- Coordinates: 35°58′56″N 50°54′19″E
- Country: Iran
- Province: Alborz
- County: Savojbolagh
- District: Chendar
- Rural District: Baraghan

Population (2016)
  - Total: 129
- Time zone: UTC+3:30 (IRST)

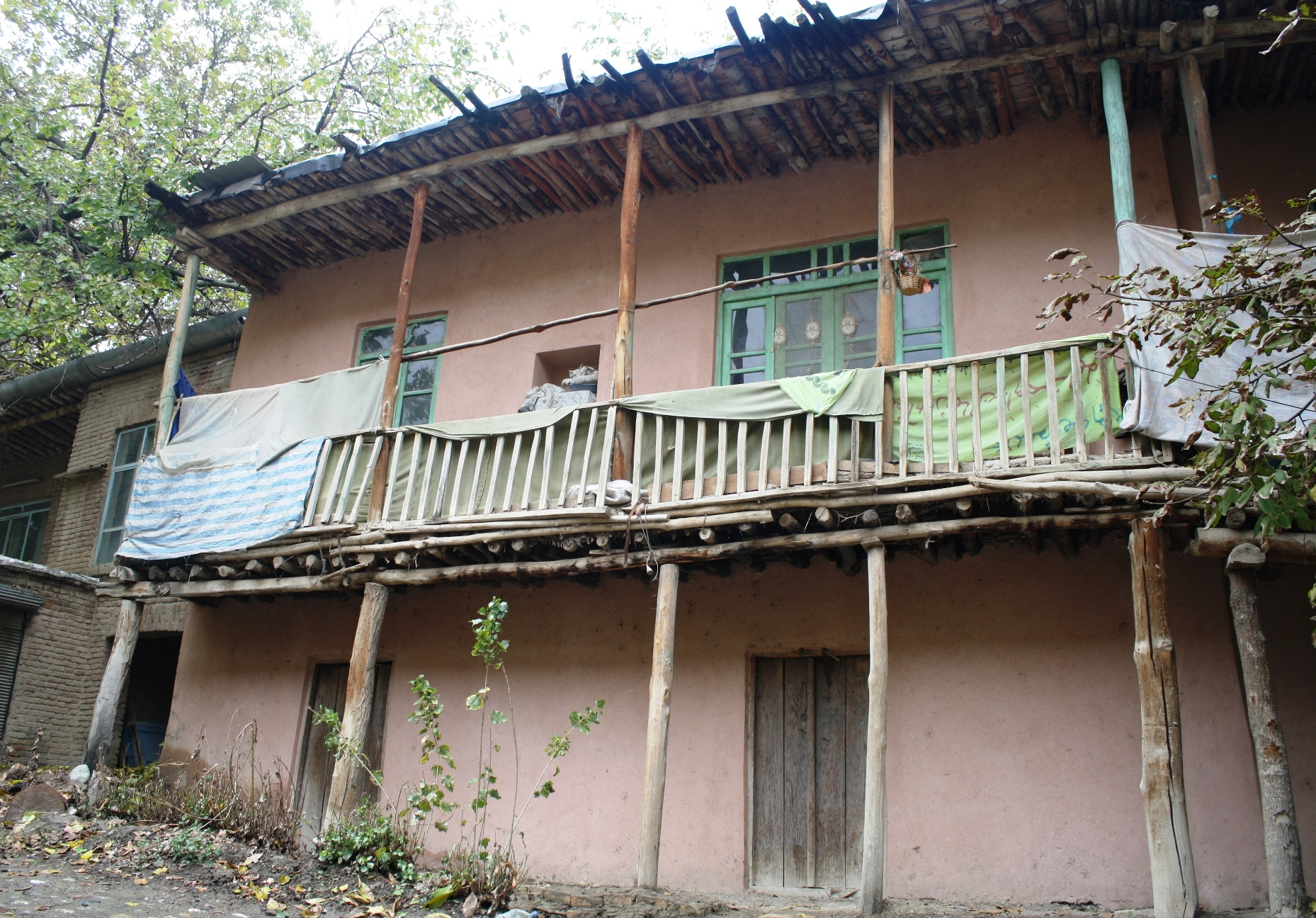
Facade of a house in Vardeh

Vardeh (Persian: ورده) (Note: Also romanized as Wardeh) is a village in Baraghan Rural District of Chendar District in Savojbolagh County, Alborz province, Iran.

== Demographics ==
=== Population ===
At the time of the 2006 National Census, the village's population was 74 in 28 households, when it was in Tehran province. The 2016 census measured the population of the village as 129 people in 53 households, by which time the county had been separated from the province in the establishment of Alborz province.
