= Aghasht =

Village in Alborz province, Iran

Aghasht Persian: اغشت
- Village
- Location within Iran
- Coordinates: 36°00′06″N 50°52′18″E
- Country: Iran
- Province: Alborz
- County: Savojbolagh
- District: Chendar
- Rural District: Baraghan

Population (2016)
  - Total: 770
- Time zone: UTC+3:30 (IRST)

Aghasht (Persian: اغشت) (Note: Also romanized as Āghasht and Āghesht; also known as Aghsha and Ātesheh) is a village in Baraghan Rural District of Chendar District in Savojbolagh County, Alborz province, Iran.

== Demographics ==
=== Population ===
At the time of the 2006 National Census, the village's population was 190, in 65 households, when it was in Tehran province. The 2016 census measured the population of the village as 770 people in 275 households, by which time the county had been separated from the province in the establishment of Alborz province. It was the most populous village in its rural district.
