= Talion =

Talion may refer to:

- lex talionis, in Latin legal terminology the ″law of exact retaliation″
- Lex Talion, an Argentine metal band
- "Talion", an episode of Stargate SG-1
- a trade name for bepotastine
- the protagonist of the video games Middle-earth: Shadow of Mordor and Middle-earth: Shadow of War

== See also ==
- Talian (disambiguation)
- Thalion (disambiguation)
- Thallium, a chemical element
