= Baghban Kalachi =

Village in Alborz province, Iran

Baghban Kalachi Persian: باغبان كلاچي
- Village
- Location within Iran
- Coordinates: 35°58′03″N 50°51′18″E
- Country: Iran
- Province: Alborz
- County: Savojbolagh
- District: Chendar
- Rural District: Baraghan

Population (2016)
  - Total: 247
- Time zone: UTC+3:30 (IRST)

Baghban Kalachi (Persian: باغبان كلاچي) (Note: Also romanized as Bāghbān Kalācheh and Bāghbān Kalāchī; also known as Bāghbān Kalā) is a village in Baraghan Rural District of Chendar District in Savojbolagh County, Alborz province, Iran.

== Demographics ==
=== Population ===
At the time of the 2006 National Census, the village's population was 72 in 25 households, when it was in Tehran province. The 2016 census measured the population of the village as 247 people in 88 households, by which time the county had been separated from the province in the establishment of Alborz province.
