= Sanj, Alborz =

Village in Alborz province, Iran

Sanj Persian: سنج
- Village
- Location within Iran
- Coordinates: 36°01′54″N 50°58′51″E
- Country: Iran
- Province: Alborz
- County: Savojbolagh
- District: Chendar
- Rural District: Baraghan

Population (2016)
  - Total: 171
- Time zone: UTC+3:30 (IRST)

Sanj (Persian: سنج) is a village in Baraghan Rural District of Chendar District in Savojbolagh County, Alborz province, Iran.

== Demographics ==
=== Population ===
At the time of the 2006 National Census, the village's population was 162, in 50 households, when it was in Tehran province. The 2016 census measured the population of the village as 171 people in 64 households, by which time the county had been separated from the province in the establishment of Alborz province.
