= Baraghan Rural District =

Rural district in Alborz province, Iran

Baraghan Rural District Persian: دهستان برغان
- Rural District
- Location within Iran
- Coordinates: 36°01′N 50°58′E
- Country: Iran
- Province: Alborz
- County: Savojbolagh
- District: Chendar
- Established: 1987
- Capital: Baraghan

Population (2016)
  - Total: 3,949
- Time zone: UTC+3:30 (IRST)

Baraghan Rural District (Persian: دهستان برغان) is in Chendar District of Savojbolagh County, Alborz province, Iran. Its capital is the village of Baraghan.

== Demographics ==
=== Population ===
At the time of the 2006 National Census, the rural district's population (as a part of Tehran province) was 1,424 in 518 households. The 2016 census measured the population of the rural district as 3,949 people in 1,484 households, by which time the county had been separated from the province in the establishment of Alborz province. The most populous of its 16 villages was Aghasht, with 770 people.

=== Other villages in the rural district ===
- Alaqeh Band
- Aminabad
- Baghban Kalachi
- Beryanchal
- Chalengdar
- Hasanabad
- Sanj
- Siah Karan
- Sibandarreh
- Sorheh
- Talian
- Tekyeh Aghasht
- Vamkuh
- Vardeh
