= Thalion =

Thalion may refer to:

- Húrin Thalion, a Tolkien character
- Thalion (band), a Brazilian metal band
- Thalion Software, a computer game company
- Thalion Technologies, software company

== See also ==
- Talion (disambiguation)
- Thallium, a chemical element
