= Chendar Rural District =

Rural district in Alborz province, Iran

Chendar Rural District Persian: دهستان چندار
- Rural District
- Location within Iran
- Coordinates: 36°00′N 50°49′E
- Country: Iran
- Province: Alborz
- County: Savojbolagh
- District: Chendar
- Established: 1987
- Capital: Kuhsar

Population (2016)
  - Total: 13,952
- Time zone: UTC+3:30 (IRST)

Chendar Rural District (Persian: دهستان چندار) is in Chendar District of Savojbolagh County, Alborz province, Iran. It is administered from the city of Kuhsar (Note: Formerly the village of Chendar)

== Demographics ==
=== Population ===
At the time of the 2006 National Census, the rural district's population (as a part of Tehran province) was 12,110 in 3,537 households. The 2016 census measured the population of the rural district as 13,952 people in 4,694 households, by which time the county had been separated from the province in the establishment of Alborz province. The most populous of its 23 villages was Kordan, with 3,795 people.

=== Other villages in the rural district ===
- Ajin Dojin
- Ardaheh
- Askul Darreh
- Aznaq
- Banu Sahra
- Duz Anbar
- Fashand
- Harjab
- Imamzadeh Shahzadeh Hoseyn
- Kalinrud
- Khurvin
- Kushk-e Zar (Note: Now a neighborhood in the city of Mehestan)
- Kolaleh Chin
- Sefid Aran
- Shendeh
- Sibestan
- Sirud
- Valian
