= Fashand =

Village in Alborz province, Iran

Fashand Persian: فشند
- Village
- Location within Iran
- Coordinates: 36°01′56″N 50°45′22″E
- Country: Iran
- Province: Alborz
- County: Savojbolagh
- District: Chendar
- Rural District: Chendar

Population (2016)
  - Total: 2,334
- Time zone: UTC+3:30 (IRST)

Fashand (Persian: فشند) (Note: Also known as Pashand) is a village in Chendar Rural District of Chendar District in Savojbolagh County, Alborz province, Iran.

== Demographics ==
=== Language ===
The people of the village speak Persian in the Tati dialect.

=== Population ===
At the time of the 2006 National Census, the village's population was 1,948 in 531 households, when it was in Tehran province. The 2016 census measured the population of the village as 2,334 people in 793 households, by which time the county had been separated from the province in the establishment of Alborz province.

== Notable people ==
- Mahmoud Bahmani
