= Baraghan =

Village in Alborz province, Iran

Baraghan Persian: برغان
- Village
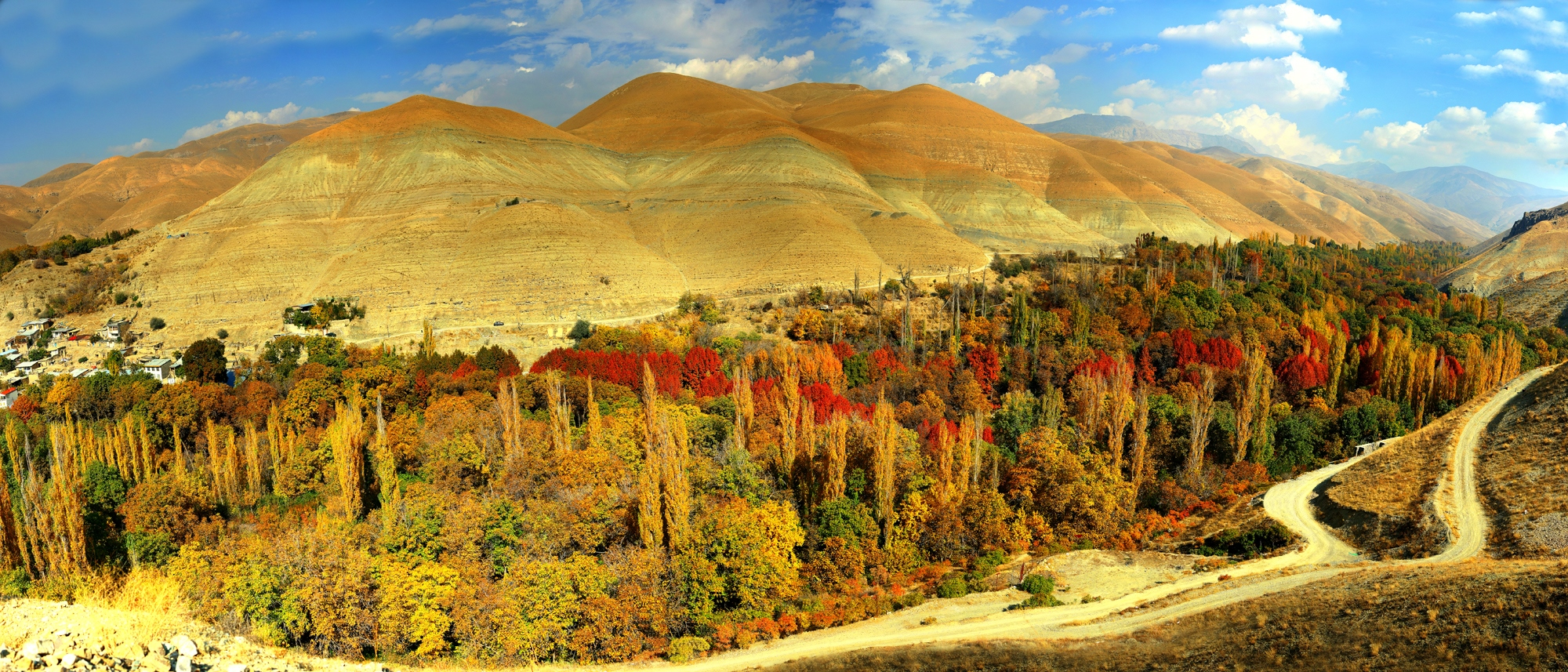
- Panoramic view from Baraghan

- Location within Iran
- Coordinates: 35°57′17″N 50°56′17″E
- Country: Iran
- Province: Alborz
- County: Savojbolagh
- District: Chendar
- Rural District: Baraghan

Population (2016)
  - Total: 470
- Time zone: UTC+3:30 (IRST)

Baraghan (Persian: برغان) (Note: Also romanized as Baraghān; also known as Barakān) is a village in, and the capital of, Baraghan Rural District in Chendar District of Savojbolagh County, Alborz province, Iran.

== Demographics ==
=== Population ===
At the time of the 2006 National Census, the village's population was 378, in 139 households, when it was in Tehran province. The 2016 census measured the population of the village as 470 people in 197 households, by which time the county had been separated from the province in the establishment of Alborz province.

== Gallery ==
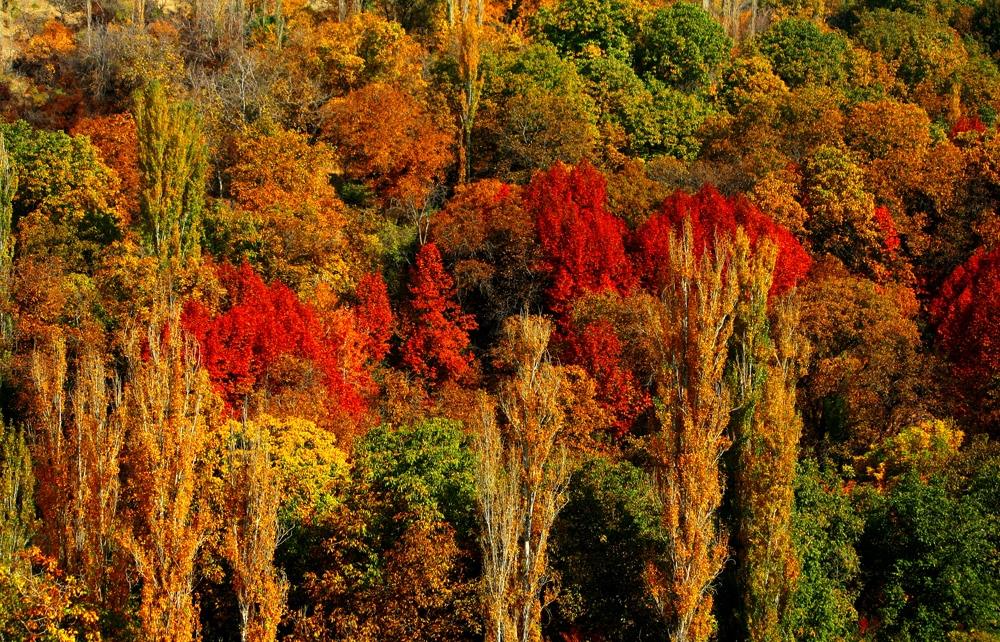

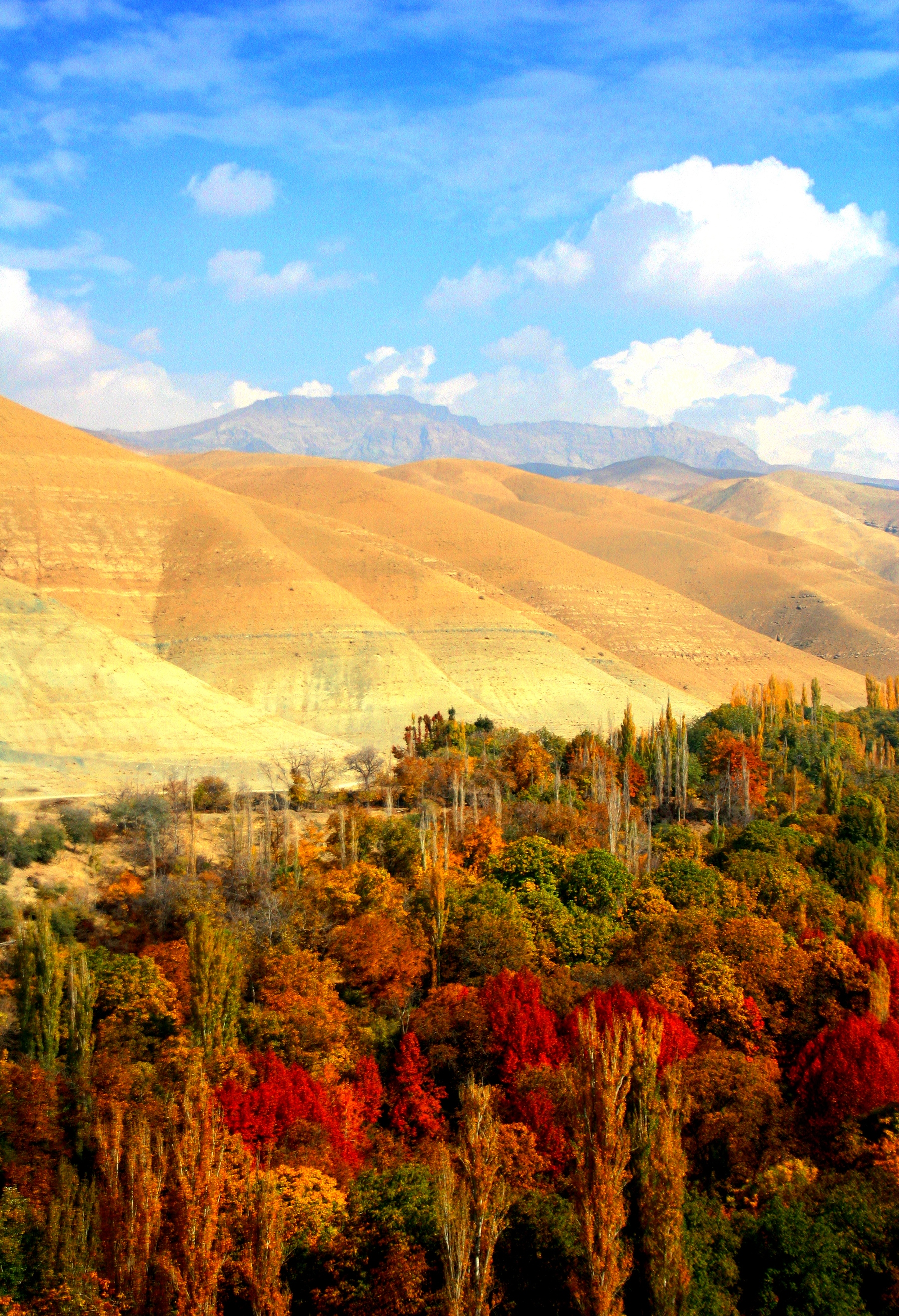

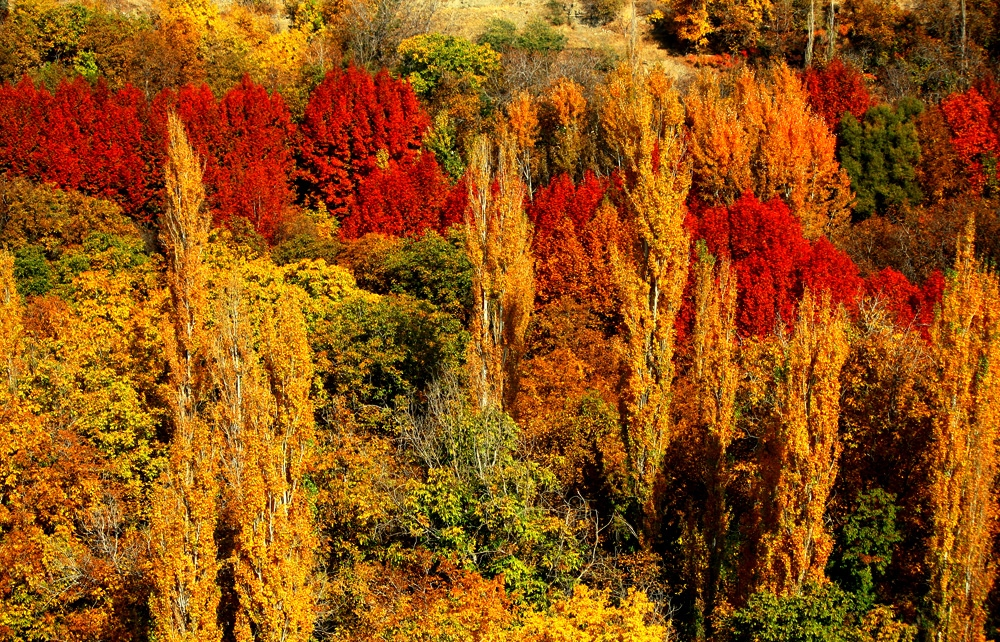
