= Talian, Iran =

Village in Alborz province, Iran

Talian Persian: طاليان
- Village
- Location within Iran
- Coordinates: 35°57′15″N 50°54′03″E
- Country: Iran
- Province: Alborz
- County: Savojbolagh
- District: Chendar
- Rural District: Baraghan

Population (2016)
  - Total: 212
- Time zone: UTC+3:30 (IRST)

Talian (Persian: طاليان) (Note: Also romanized as Tālīān and Ţālīān) is a village in Baraghan Rural District of Chendar District in Savojbolagh County, Alborz province, Iran. Talian is 20 km west of Karaj, at the foot of the Alborz mountains.

== Demographics ==
=== Population ===
At the time of the 2006 National Census, the village's population was 61, in 28 households, when it was in Tehran province. The 2016 census measured the population of the village as 212 people in 77 households, by which time the county had been separated from the province in the establishment of Alborz province.
