= Sirud, Alborz =

Village in Alborz province, Iran

Sirud Persian: سيرود
- Village
- Location within Iran
- Coordinates: 36°04′32″N 50°54′09″E
- Country: Iran
- Province: Alborz
- County: Savojbolagh
- District: Chendar
- Rural District: Chendar

Population (2016)
  - Total: 127
- Time zone: UTC+3:30 (IRST)

Sirud (Persian: سيرود) (Note: Also romanized as Sehrūd and Sīrūd) is a village in Chendar Rural District of Chendar District in Savojbolagh County, Alborz province, Iran.

== Demographics ==
=== Population ===
At the time of the 2006 National Census, the village's population was 95 in 42 households, when it was in Tehran province. The 2016 census measured the population of the village as 127 people in 56 households, by which time the county had been separated from the province in the establishment of Alborz province.
