= Pashand =

Village in Alborz province, Iran

Coordinates: 31°36′N 53°44′E

Pashand (or Fashand) is a village in Savojbolagh County, Alborz Province 75 km west of the Iranian capital of Tehran.

== Parishes ==
Pashand includes two main region entitled down (or jirma:le) and top-region (Juar ma:le). Each one also divides into some zones as Smithy-area (Angarma:le), (hoshtekola), Back-Garden (poshte bagh), tekki, ra:sto kucho (Direct-alley) etc.
