= Imamzadeh Hossein (Kordan) =

Imamzadeh in Alborz, Iran

- امامزاده حسین
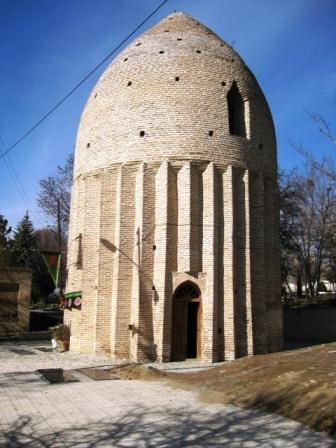
- The imamzadeh in 2017

- Location of the complex in Iran

Religion
- Affiliation: Shia Islam
- Ecclesiastical or organisational status: Imamzadeh and mausoleum
- Status: Active
- Architectural features: Triacontatetragon and hexagonal floorplans

Location
- Location: Kordan, Alborz Province
- Country: Iran
- Interactive map of Imamzadeh Hossein
- Coordinates: 35°56′2″N 50°50′18″E

Architecture
- Type: Islamic architecture
- Style: Seljuk

Specifications
- Dome: One
- Dome height (outer): 6 m (20 ft)
- Shrines: Two: (Prince Hussien and Bibi Nesa)
- Materials: Bricks; plaster

Iran National Heritage List
- Official name: Imamzadeh Hossein
- Type: Built
- Designated: 15 May 2001
- Reference no.: 3828
- Conservation organization: Cultural Heritage, Handicrafts and Tourism Organization of Iran

The Imamzadeh Hossein (Persian: امامزاده حسین), (Note: Also spelled as the Imamzadeh Husayn.) also known as the Shahzadeh Hossein (Persian: شاهزاده حسین) is a Shia funerary monument and religious complex, located in Kordan, in the province of Alborz, Iran. The building dates from the Sejuk era and is the burial site of one of the descendants of the fourth Shia Imam, Zayn al-Abidin.

The exterior floorpan of the building is unusual in that it is formed in the shape of a star with 34 nodes (triacontatetragon), that come together to form the dome. The interior floorpan of the dome is hexagonal. The complex was added to the Iran National Heritage List on 15 May 2001 and is administered by the Cultural Heritage, Handicrafts and Tourism Organization of Iran. The shrine a holy site in Shia Islam.

== See also ==
- Holiest sites in Shia Islam
- Shia Islam in Iran
- List of imamzadehs in Iran
- List of mausoleums in Iran
