= Kuhsar =

City in Alborz province, Iran

Kuhsar Persian: كوهسار
- City
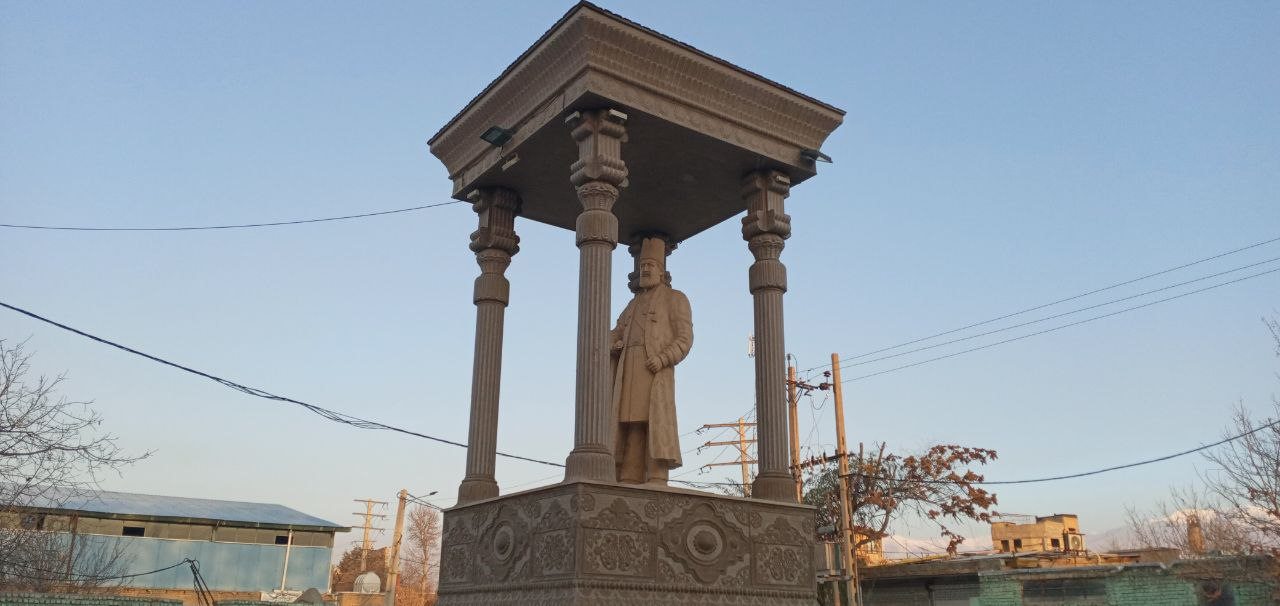

- Location within Iran
- Coordinates: 35°57′54″N 50°47′27″E
- Country: Iran
- Province: Alborz
- County: Savojbolagh
- District: Chendar
- Established as a city: 2004

Population (2016)
  - Total: 10,940
- Time zone: UTC+3:30 (IRST)

Kuhsar (Persian: كوهسار (Note: Formerly known as Chendar (چِندار), also romanized as Chandār and Chendār. Kuhsar is the merger two former villages: Chendar and Qaleh-ye Chendar (قلعه چندار), also known as Qal‘e-ye Chendar (قلعه ی چندار), and Qal‘e-ye Soleymankhani (قلعه سلیمانخانی)) is a city in, and the capital of, Chendar District in Savojbolagh County, Alborz province, Iran.

== Demographics ==
=== Population ===
At the time of the 2006 National Census, the city's population was 7,757, in 2,075 households, when it was in Tehran province. The 2016 census measured the population of the city as 10,940 in 3,321 households, by which time the county had been separated from the province in the establishment of Alborz province.
