= Chendar District =

District in Alborz province, Iran

Chendar District Persian: بخش چندار
- District
- Location within Iran
- Coordinates: 36°01′N 50°55′E
- Country: Iran
- Province: Alborz
- County: Savojbolagh
- Capital: Kuhsar

Population (2016)
  - Total: 28,841
- Time zone: UTC+3:30 (IRST)

Chendar District (Persian: بخش چندار) is in Savojbolagh County, Alborz province, Iran. Its capital is the city of Kuhsar.

== Demographics ==
=== Population ===
At the time of the 2006 National Census, the district's population was 21,291 in 6,130 households, when it was in Tehran province. The 2016 census measured the population of the district as 28,841 in 9,499 households, by which time the county had been separated from the province in the establishment of Alborz province.

=== Administrative divisions ===
Chendar District Population (Note: As a part of Tehran province at the 2006 Census)
Administrative Divisions	2006	2016
Baraghan RD	1,424	3,949
Chendar RD	12,110	13,952
Kuhsar (city)	7,757	10,940
Total	21,291	28,841
RD = Rural District
