= Qarah Bolagh =

Qarah Bolagh or Qareh Bolagh (Persian: قره بلاغ), also rendered as Qarah Bowlagh or Qareh Bowlagh or Qara Bulaq or Kara-Bulag or Qarah Bulagh or Qareh Bulagh, may refer to:

== Ardabil Province ==
- Qarah Bolagh, Ardabil

== East Azerbaijan Province ==
- Qarah Bolagh, Bostanabad, East Azerbaijan province
- Qarah Bolagh, Hashtrud, East Azerbaijan province
- Qarah Bolagh, Jolfa, East Azerbaijan province
- Qareh Bolagh, Marand, East Azerbaijan province
- Qarah Bolagh, Kolah Boz-e Sharqi, Mianeh County, East Azerbaijan province
- Qarah Bolagh, Kaghazkonan, Mianeh County, East Azerbaijan province
- Qareh Bolagh, alternate name of Quch Ghar, Kaghazkonan District, Mianeh County, East Azerbaijan province
- Qarah Bolagh, Sarab, East Azerbaijan province
- Qareh Bolagh, Varzaqan, East Azerbaijan province

== Fars Province ==
- Qarah Bolagh, Fasa, a city in Fasa County
- Qarah Bolagh Rural District (Fasa County)

== Golestan Province ==
- Qarah Bolagh, Golestan

== Hamadan Province ==
- Qarah Bolagh, Asadabad, Hamadan province
- Qarah Bolagh, Razan, Hamadan province

== Kermanshah Province ==
- Qareh Bolagh-e Azam, Kermanshah province
- Qareh Bolagh Sheykh Morad, Kermanshah province

== Kurdistan Province ==
- Qarah Bolagh, Baneh, a village in Baneh County
- Qarah Bolagh, Bijar, a village in Bijar County
- Qarah Bolagh-e Miankuh, a village in Bijar County
- Qarah Bolagh-e Khan, a village in Qorveh County
- Qarah Bolagh-e Panjeh, a village in Qorveh County

== Qazvin Province ==
- Qarah Bolagh, Qazvin

== West Azerbaijan Province ==
- Qarah Bolagh, Mahabad, West Azerbaijan province
- Qarah Bolagh, Bazargan, Maku County, West Azerbaijan province
- Qarah Bolagh, Takab, West Azerbaijan province
- Qareh Bolagh-e Olya, West Azerbaijan province
- Qareh Bolagh-e Sofla, West Azerbaijan province

== Zanjan Province ==
- Qarah Bulagh, Zanjan
- Qarah Bolagh, Abhar, Zanjan province
- Qarah Bolagh, Ijrud, Zanjan province
- Qarah Bolagh Rural District (Soltaniyeh County)
