= Chali Bolagh =

Chali Bolagh چالي بلاغ
- Village
- Location within Iran
- Coordinates: 36°03′19″N 47°43′51″E
- Country: Iran
- Province: Kurdistan
- County: Bijar
- Bakhsh: Central
- Rural District: Seylatan

Population (2006)
  - Total: 51
- Time zone: UTC+3:30 (IRST)
  - Summer (DST): UTC+4:30 (IRDT)

Chali Bolagh (Persian: چالي بلاغ, also Romanized as Chālī Bolāgh) is a village in Seylatan Rural District, in the Central District of Bijar County, Kurdistan province, Iran. At the 2006 census, its population was 51, in 11 families. The village is populated by Azerbaijanis.
