= Jafarabad, Chang Almas =

Jafarabad جعفر آباد
- Village
- Location within Iran
- Coordinates: 35°50′02″N 48°01′05″E
- Country: Iran
- Province: Kurdistan
- County: Bijar
- Bakhsh: Chang Almas
- Rural District: Pir Taj

Population (2006)
  - Total: 141
- Time zone: UTC+3:30 (IRST)
  - Summer (DST): UTC+4:30 (IRDT)

Jafarabad (Persian: جعفر آباد, also Romanized as Ja‘farābād) is a village in Pir Taj Rural District, Chang Almas District, Bijar County, Kurdistan province, Iran. At the 2006 census, its population was 141, in 31 families. The village is populated by Kurds.
