= Darvish Khaki =

Darvish Khaki درويش خاكي
- Village
- Location within Iran
- Coordinates: 35°51′18″N 47°14′05″E
- Country: Iran
- Province: Kurdistan
- County: Bijar
- Bakhsh: Central
- Rural District: Najafabad

Population (2006)
  - Total: 126
- Time zone: UTC+3:30 (IRST)
  - Summer (DST): UTC+4:30 (IRDT)

Darvish Khaki (Persian: درويش خاكي, also Romanized as Darvīsh Khākī; also known as Dhares Khākē) is a village in Najafabad Rural District, in the Central District of Bijar County, Kurdistan province, Iran. At the 2006 census, its population was 126, in 27 families. The village is populated by Kurds.
