= Deh Raqeh-ye Pir Hoseyn =

Deh Raqeh-ye Pir Hoseyn دهرقه پيرحسين
- Village
- Location within Iran
- Coordinates: 35°41′17″N 47°19′42″E
- Country: Iran
- Province: Kurdistan
- County: Bijar
- Bakhsh: Central
- Rural District: Najafabad

Population (2006)
  - Total: 138
- Time zone: UTC+3:30 (IRST)
  - Summer (DST): UTC+4:30 (IRDT)

Deh Raqeh-ye Pir Hoseyn (Persian: دهرقه پيرحسين, also Romanized as Deh Raqeh-ye Pīr Ḩoseyn; also known as Deh-e Reqā, Deh-i-Reqa, Deh Raqā, Dehraqeh-ye Mīrḩoseyn, Deh Raqqa, Diyeh Ragheh, and Dīyeh Raqqeh) is a village in Najafabad Rural District, in the Central District of Bijar County, Kurdistan Province, Iran. At the 2006 census, its population was 138, in 31 families. The village is populated by Kurds.
