= Khezrdin =

Khezrdin خزردين
- Village
- Location within Iran
- Coordinates: 35°38′18″N 47°36′12″E
- Country: Iran
- Province: Kurdistan
- County: Bijar
- Bakhsh: Chang Almas
- Rural District: Khosrowabad

Population (2006)
  - Total: 101
- Time zone: UTC+3:30 (IRST)
  - Summer (DST): UTC+4:30 (IRDT)

Khezrdin (Persian: خزردين, also Romanized as Khezrdīn; also known as Kherzdīn) is a village in Khosrowabad Rural District, Chang Almas District, Bijar County, Kurdistan Province, Iran. At the 2006 census, its population was 101, in 22 families. The village is populated by Kurds.
