= Qeshlaq-e Hasan Khan =

Qeshlaq-e Hasan Khan قشلاق حسن خان
- Village
- Location within Iran
- Coordinates: 35°59′42″N 47°43′36″E
- Country: Iran
- Province: Kurdistan
- County: Bijar
- Bakhsh: Central
- Rural District: Khvor Khvoreh

Population (2006)
  - Total: 146
- Time zone: UTC+3:30 (IRST)
  - Summer (DST): UTC+4:30 (IRDT)

Qeshlaq-e Hasan Khan (Persian: قشلاق حسن خان, also Romanized as Qeshlāq-e Ḩasan Khān, Qeshlāq Ḩasan Khān, and Qishlāq Hasan Khān; also known as Qeshlāq-e Ḩasan) is a village in Khvor Khvoreh Rural District, in the Central District of Bijar County, Kurdistan Province, Iran. At the 2006 census, its population was 146, in 30 families. The village is populated by Kurds.
