= Maqut =

Maqut ماقوت
- Village
- Location within Iran
- Coordinates: 35°50′52″N 47°50′36″E
- Country: Iran
- Province: Kurdistan
- County: Bijar
- Bakhsh: Central
- Rural District: Khvor Khvoreh

Population (2006)
  - Total: 100
- Time zone: UTC+3:30 (IRST)
  - Summer (DST): UTC+4:30 (IRDT)

Maqut (Persian: ماقوت, also Romanized as Māqūt; also known as Māh-i-Kūt) is a village in Khvor Khvoreh Rural District, in the Central District of Bijar County, Kurdistan Province, Iran. At the 2006 census, its population was 100, in 22 families. The village is populated by Kurds.
