= Madak, Kurdistan =

Madak مدك
- Village
- Location within Iran
- Coordinates: 36°12′31″N 47°30′34″E
- Country: Iran
- Province: Kurdistan
- County: Bijar
- Bakhsh: Central
- Rural District: Siyah Mansur

Population (2006)
  - Total: 96
- Time zone: UTC+3:30 (IRST)
  - Summer (DST): UTC+4:30 (IRDT)

Madak (Persian: مدك) is a village in Siyah Mansur Rural District, in the Central District of Bijar County, Kurdistan province, Iran. At the 2006 census, its population was 96, in 22 families. The village is populated by Azerbaijanis.
