= Qazi Qushchi =

Qazi Qushchi قاضي قوشچي
- Village
- Location within Iran
- Coordinates: 35°51′32″N 47°23′15″E
- Country: Iran
- Province: Kurdistan
- County: Bijar
- Bakhsh: Central
- Rural District: Howmeh

Population (2006)
  - Total: 99
- Time zone: UTC+3:30 (IRST)
  - Summer (DST): UTC+4:30 (IRDT)

Qazi Qushchi (Persian: قاضي قوشچي, also Romanized as Qāẕī Qūshchī) is a village in Howmeh Rural District, in the Central District of Bijar County, Kurdistan Province, Iran. At the 2006 census, its population was 99, in 22 families. The village is populated by Kurds.
