= Owch Gol =

Owch Gol اوچ گل
- Village
- Location within Iran
- Coordinates: 36°13′38″N 47°26′27″E
- Country: Iran
- Province: Kurdistan
- County: Bijar
- Bakhsh: Central
- Rural District: Siyah Mansur

Population (2006)
  - Total: 122
- Time zone: UTC+3:30 (IRST)
  - Summer (DST): UTC+4:30 (IRDT)

Owch Gol (Persian: اوچ گل, also Romanized as Ūchgol) is a village in Siyah Mansur Rural District, in the Central District of Bijar County, Kurdistan Province, Iran. At the 2006 census, its population was 122, in 22 families. The village is populated by Azerbaijanis.
