= Cheshmeh Khalil =

Cheshmeh Khalil چشمه خليل
- Village
- Location within Iran
- Coordinates: 35°35′18″N 47°37′05″E
- Country: Iran
- Province: Kurdistan
- County: Bijar
- Bakhsh: Chang Almas
- Rural District: Khosrowabad

Population (2006)
  - Total: 56
- Time zone: UTC+3:30 (IRST)
  - Summer (DST): UTC+4:30 (IRDT)

Cheshmeh Khalil (Persian: چشمه خليل, also Romanized as Cheshmeh Khalīl, Chashmeh Khalīl, Chashmeh-ye Khalīl, and Cheshmeh-ye Khalīl; also known as Shashma Khalil) is a village in Khosrowabad Rural District, Chang Almas District, Bijar County, Kurdistan province, Iran. At the 2006 census, its population was 56, in 14 families. The village is populated by Kurds.
