= Baba Karam =

Baba Karam باباكرم
- Village
- Location within Iran
- Coordinates: 35°46′47″N 47°44′02″E
- Country: Iran
- Province: Kurdistan
- County: Bijar
- Bakhsh: Chang Almas
- Rural District: Babarashani

Population (2006)
  - Total: 30
- Time zone: UTC+3:30 (IRST)
  - Summer (DST): UTC+4:30 (IRDT)

Baba Karam (Persian: باباكرم, also Romanized as Bābā Karam) is a village in Babarashani Rural District, Chang Almas District, Bijar County, Kurdistan province, Iran. At the 2006 census, its population was 30, in 7 families. The village is populated by Kurds.
