= Gug Qash =

Gug Qash گوگقاش
- Village
- Location within Iran
- Coordinates: 35°41′15″N 48°01′31″E
- Country: Iran
- Province: Kurdistan
- County: Bijar
- Bakhsh: Chang Almas
- Rural District: Pir Taj

Population (2006)
  - Total: 103
- Time zone: UTC+3:30 (IRST)
  - Summer (DST): UTC+4:30 (IRDT)

Gug Qash (Persian: گوگقاش, also Romanized as Gūg Qāsh and Gūgqāsh) is a village in Pir Taj Rural District, Chang Almas District, Bijar County, Kurdistan province, Iran. At the 2006 census, its population was 103, in 19 families. The village is populated by Azerbaijanis.
