= Qezel Aghaj =

Qezel Aghaj قزل آغاج
- Village
- Location within Iran
- Coordinates: 35°43′25″N 47°42′02″E
- Country: Iran
- Province: Kurdistan
- County: Bijar
- Bakhsh: Chang Almas
- Rural District: Babarashani

Population (2006)
  - Total: 82
- Time zone: UTC+3:30 (IRST)
  - Summer (DST): UTC+4:30 (IRDT)

Qezel Aghaj (Persian: قزل آغاج, also romanized as Qezel Āghāj; also known as Qezel Āqāch, Qezel Āqāj, and Qizil Aghāch) is a village in Babarashani Rural District, Chang Almas District, Bijar County, Kurdistan Province, Iran. At the 2006 census its population was 82, in 22 families. The village is populated by Iranian Azerbaijanis.
