= Qavshoq =

Qavshoq قاوشق
- Village
- Location within Iran
- Coordinates: 36°14′36″N 47°25′24″E
- Country: Iran
- Province: Kurdistan
- County: Bijar
- Bakhsh: Central
- Rural District: Siyah Mansur

Population (2006)
  - Total: 56
- Time zone: UTC+3:30 (IRST)
  - Summer (DST): UTC+4:30 (IRDT)

Qavshoq (Persian: قاوشق, also Romanized as Qāvshoq; also known as Qavshowq) is a village in Siyah Mansur Rural District, in the Central District of Bijar County, Kurdistan Province, Iran. At the 2006 census, its population was 56, in 13 families. The village is populated by Azerbaijanis.
