= Qareh Darband =

Qareh Darband قره دربند
- Village
- Location within Iran
- Coordinates: 35°36′23″N 47°48′20″E
- Country: Iran
- Province: Kurdistan
- County: Bijar
- Bakhsh: Chang Almas
- Rural District: Babarashani

Population (2006)
  - Total: 93
- Time zone: UTC+3:30 (IRST)
  - Summer (DST): UTC+4:30 (IRDT)

Qareh Darband (Persian: قره دربند; also known as Qarā Darband) is a village in Babarashani Rural District, Chang Almas District, Bijar County, Kurdistan Province, Iran. At the 2006 census, its population was 93, in 23 families. The village is populated by Kurds.
