= Nedri =

Nedri ندري
- Village
- Location within Iran
- Coordinates: 35°45′49″N 47°31′47″E
- Country: Iran
- Province: Kurdistan
- County: Bijar
- Bakhsh: Central
- Rural District: Howmeh

Population (2006)
  - Total: 77
- Time zone: UTC+3:30 (IRST)
  - Summer (DST): UTC+4:30 (IRDT)

Nedri (Persian: ندري, also Romanized as Nedrī, Nādarī, Nāderī, and Nadrī) is a village in Howmeh Rural District, in the Central District of Bijar County, Kurdistan Province, Iran. At the 2006 census, its population was 77, in 19 families. The village is populated by Kurds.
