= Qezel Kand =

Qezel Kand (Persian: قزل كند), also rendered as Ghezel Kand, may refer to:

- Qezel Kand, Afghanistan
- Qezel Kand, Iran
- Qezel Kand, Razavi Khorasan, Iran
- Qezel Kand-e Olya, Iran
- Qezel Kand-e Sofla, Iran
