= Qeshlaqlu =

Qeshlaqlu قشلاق لو
- Village
- Location within Iran
- Coordinates: 35°47′45″N 47°17′00″E
- Country: Iran
- Province: Kurdistan
- County: Bijar
- Bakhsh: Central
- Rural District: Najafabad

Population (2006)
  - Total: 82
- Time zone: UTC+3:30 (IRST)
  - Summer (DST): UTC+4:30 (IRDT)

Qeshlaqlu (Persian: قشلاق لو, also Romanized as Qeshlāqlū) is a village in Najafabad Rural District, in the Central District of Bijar County, Kurdistan Province, Iran. At the 2006 census, its population was 82, in 19 families. The village is populated by Kurds.
