= Baba Sorkheh =

Baba Sorkheh باباسرخه
- Village
- Location within Iran
- Coordinates: 35°51′37″N 47°28′02″E
- Country: Iran
- Province: Kurdistan
- County: Bijar
- Bakhsh: Central
- Rural District: Howmeh

Population (2006)
  - Total: 102
- Time zone: UTC+3:30 (IRST)
  - Summer (DST): UTC+4:30 (IRDT)

Baba Sorkheh (Persian: باباسرخه, also Romanized as Bābā Sorkheh; also known as Bāba Sūrkh and Bāba Sūrkheh) is a village in Howmeh Rural District, in the Central District of Bijar County, Kurdistan Province, Iran. At the 2006 census, its population was 102, in 25 families. The village is populated by Kurds.
