= Khusheh Gol =

Khusheh Gol خوشه گل
- Village
- Location within Iran
- Coordinates: 36°04′21″N 47°35′29″E
- Country: Iran
- Province: Kurdistan
- County: Bijar
- Bakhsh: Central
- Rural District: Seylatan

Population (2006)
  - Total: 37
- Time zone: UTC+3:30 (IRST)
  - Summer (DST): UTC+4:30 (IRDT)

Khusheh Gol (Persian: خوشه گل, also Romanized as Khūsheh Gol) is a village in Seylatan Rural District, in the Central District of Bijar County, Kurdistan province, Iran. At the 2006 census, its population was 37, in 13 families. The village is populated by Kurds.
