= Qomdarreh =

Qomdarreh قمدره
- Village
- Location within Iran
- Coordinates: 35°56′25″N 47°23′39″E
- Country: Iran
- Province: Kurdistan
- County: Bijar
- Bakhsh: Central
- Rural District: Howmeh

Population (2006)
  - Total: 67
- Time zone: UTC+3:30 (IRST)
  - Summer (DST): UTC+4:30 (IRDT)

Qomdarreh (Persian: قمدره; also known as Gomdarreh) is a village in Howmeh Rural District, in the Central District of Bijar County, Kurdistan Province, Iran. At the 2006 census, its population was 67, in 13 families. The village is populated by Kurds.
