= Gav Daneh Zar =

Gav Daneh Zar گاودانه زار
- Village
- Location within Iran
- Coordinates: 35°36′11″N 47°23′54″E
- Country: Iran
- Province: Kurdistan
- County: Bijar
- Bakhsh: Chang Almas
- Rural District: Khosrowabad

Population (2006)
  - Total: 73
- Time zone: UTC+3:30 (IRST)
  - Summer (DST): UTC+4:30 (IRDT)

Gav Daneh Zar (Persian: گاودانه زار, also Romanized as Gāv Dāneh Zār; also known as Kān-e Zar, Kānī Zar, and Kan Zar) is a village in Khosrowabad Rural District, Chang Almas District, Bijar County, Kurdistan Province, Iran. At the 2006 census, its population was 73, in 14 families. The village is populated by Kurds.
