= Cheshmeh Jan Qoli =

Cheshmeh Jan Qoli چشمه جان قلي
- Village
- Location within Iran
- Coordinates: 35°49′17″N 47°26′38″E
- Country: Iran
- Province: Kurdistan
- County: Bijar
- Bakhsh: Central
- Rural District: Howmeh

Population (2006)
  - Total: 105
- Time zone: UTC+3:30 (IRST)
  - Summer (DST): UTC+4:30 (IRDT)

Cheshmeh Jan Qoli (Persian: چشمه جان قلي, also Romanized as Cheshmeh Jān Qolī and Chashmeh-ye Jānqolī, Cheshmeh Jānqolī, and Cheshmeh-ye Jānqolī; also known as Cheshmeh Khānqolī, Ganj-i-Quli, Kānī-ye Jānqolī, and Kanj-e Kūlī) is a village in Howmeh Rural District, in the Central District of Bijar County, Kurdistan Province, Iran. At the 2006 census, its population was 105, in 28 families. The village is populated by Kurds.
