= Tahmures =

Tahmures طهمورث
- Village
- Location within Iran
- Coordinates: 35°41′41″N 47°37′40″E
- Country: Iran
- Province: Kurdistan
- County: Bijar
- Bakhsh: Chang Almas
- Rural District: Babarashani

Population (2006)
  - Total: 83
- Time zone: UTC+3:30 (IRST)
  - Summer (DST): UTC+4:30 (IRDT)

Tahmures (Persian: طهمورث, also romanized as Ṭahmūres and Tehmuras; also known as Ṭahures̄) is a village in Babarashani Rural District, Chang Almas District, Bijar County, Kurdistan Province, Iran. At the 2006 census, its population was 83, in 19 families. The village is populated by Kurds.
