= Veys Morid =

Veys Morid ويسمريد
- Village
- Location within Iran
- Coordinates: 35°49′06″N 47°31′06″E
- Country: Iran
- Province: Kurdistan
- County: Bijar
- Bakhsh: Central
- Rural District: Howmeh

Population (2006)
  - Total: 60
- Time zone: UTC+3:30 (IRST)
  - Summer (DST): UTC+4:30 (IRDT)

Veys Morid (Persian: ويسمريد, also Romanized as Veys Morīd and Veis Morid; also known as Vāzmīreh, Veys Morī, and Wāzmīri) is a village in Howmeh Rural District, in the Central District of Bijar County, Kurdistan Province, Iran. At the 2006 census, its population was 60, in 12 families. The village is populated by Kurds.
