= Gonbadi =

Gonbadi گنبدي
- Village
- Location within Iran
- Coordinates: 35°50′17″N 47°47′59″E
- Country: Iran
- Province: Kurdistan
- County: Bijar
- Bakhsh: Central
- Rural District: Khvor Khvoreh

Population (2006)
  - Total: 95
- Time zone: UTC+3:30 (IRST)
  - Summer (DST): UTC+4:30 (IRDT)

Gonbadi (Persian: گنبدي, also Romanized as Gonbadī) is a village in Khvor Khvoreh Rural District, in the Central District of Bijar County, Kurdistan Province, Iran. At the 2006 census, its population was 95, in 22 families. The village is populated by Kurds.
