= Aq Bolagh-e Chang Almas =

Aq Bolagh-e Chang Almas آقبلاغ چنگ الماس
- Village
- Location within Iran
- Coordinates: 35°45′57″N 48°01′58″E
- Country: Iran
- Province: Kurdistan
- County: Bijar
- Bakhsh: Chang Almas
- Rural District: Pir Taj

Population (2006)
  - Total: 181
- Time zone: UTC+3:30 (IRST)
  - Summer (DST): UTC+4:30 (IRDT)

Aq Bolagh-e Chang Almas (Persian: آقبلاغ چنگ الماس, also Romanized as Āq Bolāgh-e Chang Almās; also known as Āghbolāgh, Aghbolagh Gavbazeh, Āq Bolāgh-e Chang Almāsī, Aq Bolāq-e Chang Almās, and Āq Bulāq Changal Almās) is a village in Pir Taj Rural District, Chang Almas District, Bijar County, Kurdistan province, Iran. At the 2006 census, its population was 181, in 45 families. The village is populated by Azerbaijanis.
