= Ali Badal =

Ali Badal علي بدل
- Village
- Location within Iran
- Coordinates: 35°55′55″N 47°33′54″E
- Country: Iran
- Province: Kurdistan
- County: Bijar
- Bakhsh: Central
- Rural District: Howmeh

Population (2006)
  - Total: 19
- Time zone: UTC+3:30 (IRST)
  - Summer (DST): UTC+4:30 (IRDT)

Ali Badal (Persian: علي بدل, also Romanized as ‘Alī Badal; also known as ‘Ali Bādeh) is a village in Howmeh Rural District, in the Central District of Bijar County, Kurdistan Province, Iran. At the 2006 census, its population was 19, in 8 families. The village is populated by Kurds.
