= Fathabad, Kurdistan =

Fathabad فتح آباد
- Village
- Location within Iran
- Coordinates: 35°50′20″N 47°59′51″E
- Country: Iran
- Province: Kurdistan
- County: Bijar
- Bakhsh: Chang Almas
- Rural District: Pir Taj

Population (2006)
  - Total: 121
- Time zone: UTC+3:30 (IRST)
  - Summer (DST): UTC+4:30 (IRDT)

Fathabad (Persian: فتح آباد, also Romanized as Fatḩābād; also known as Fatehābād and Qareh Saqal) is a village in Pir Taj Rural District, Chang Almas District, Bijar County, Kurdistan Province, Iran. At the 2006 census, its population was 121, in 23 families. The village is populated by Azerbaijanis with a Kurdish minority.
