= Gavandag =

Gavandag گوندگ
- Village
- Location within Iran
- Coordinates: 35°46′18″N 47°22′26″E
- Country: Iran
- Province: Kurdistan
- County: Bijar
- Bakhsh: Central
- Rural District: Najafabad

Population (2006)
  - Total: 65
- Time zone: UTC+3:30 (IRST)
  - Summer (DST): UTC+4:30 (IRDT)

Gavandag (Persian: گوندگ; also known as Gavandak, Gavandok) is a village in Najafabad Rural District, in the Central District of Bijar County, Kurdistan province, Iran. At the 2006 census, its population was 65, in 15 families. The village is populated by Kurds.
