= Hoseyn Khan, Kurdistan =

Hoseyn Khan حسين خان
- Village
- Location within Iran
- Coordinates: 35°43′13″N 47°17′14″E
- Country: Iran
- Province: Kurdistan
- County: Bijar
- Bakhsh: Central
- Rural District: Najafabad

Population (2006)
  - Total: 93
- Time zone: UTC+3:30 (IRST)
  - Summer (DST): UTC+4:30 (IRDT)

Hoseyn Khan (Persian: حسين خان, also Romanized as Ḩoseyn Khān; also known as Husain Khān) is a village in Najafabad Rural District, in the Central District of Bijar County, Kurdistan province, Iran. At the 2006 census, its population was 93, in 25 families. The village is populated by Kurds.
