= Qarah Bolagh, Bijar =

Qarah Bolagh قره بلاغ
- Village
- Location within Iran
- Coordinates: 35°53′46″N 47°32′43″E
- Country: Iran
- Province: Kurdistan
- County: Bijar
- Bakhsh: Central
- Rural District: Howmeh

Population (2006)
  - Total: 21
- Time zone: UTC+3:30 (IRST)
  - Summer (DST): UTC+4:30 (IRDT)

Qarah Bolagh (Persian: قره بلاغ, also Romanized as Qarah Bolāgh and Qareh Bolāgh; also known as Qārā Bolāgh, Qara Bulāq, Qarah Bolāgh-e Ḩowmeh Bījār, and Qareh Būlāgh) is a village in Howmeh Rural District, in the Central District of Bijar County, Kurdistan Province, Iran. At the 2006 census, its population was 21, in 4 families. The village is populated by Kurds.
