= Shirin Bolagh, Kurdistan =

Village in Kurdistan province, Iran

Shirin Bolagh Persian: شيرين بلاغ
- Village
- Location within Iran Location within Iran Kurdistan
- Coordinates: 36°04′04″N 47°57′11″E
- Country: Iran
- Province: Kurdistan
- County: Bijar
- District: Central
- Rural District: Seylatan

Population (2016)
  - Total: 155
- Time zone: UTC+3:30 (IRST)

Shirin Bolagh (Persian: شيرين بلاغ) (Note: Also romanized as Shīrīn Bolāgh) is a village in Seylatan Rural District of the Central District in Bijar County, Kurdistan province, Iran.

== Demographics ==
=== Ethnicity ===
The village is populated by Azerbaijanis.

=== Population ===
At the time of the 2006 National Census, the village's population was 300 in 57 households. The following census in 2011 counted 203 people in 48 households. The 2016 census measured the population of the village as 155 people in 49 households.
