= Chehel Amiran =

Chehel Amiran (Persian: چهل اميران) may refer to:

- Chehel Amiran, Bijar
- Chehel Amiran, Chang Almas, Bijar County
