= Hoseynkhan =

Hoseynkhan or Hoseyn Khan (Persian: حسين خان) may refer to:

- Hoseyn Khan, Kurdistan
- Hoseyn Aliabad, Lorestan
- Hoseynkhan, Lorestan
- Hoseynkhan, alternate name of Chenaran, Lorestan

== See also ==
- Hussain Khan, Indian equestrian
- Hussein Khan, director of the film Kashmir Daily
