= Qarajalu, Kurdistan =

Village in Kurdistan province, Iran

Qarajalu Persian: قراجلو
- Village
- Location within Iran Location within Iran Kurdistan
- Coordinates: 36°05′00″N 47°54′00″E
- Country: Iran
- Province: Kurdistan
- County: Bijar
- District: Central
- Rural District: Seylatan

Population (2016)
  - Total: 90
- Time zone: UTC+3:30 (IRST)

Qarajalu (Persian: قراجلو) (Note: Also romanized as Qarājalū; also known as Qareh Jelū) is a village in Seylatan Rural District of the Central District in Bijar County, Kurdistan province, Iran.

== Demographics ==
=== Ethnicity ===
The village is populated by Azerbaijanis.

=== Population ===
At the time of the 2006 National Census, the village's population was 141 in 35 households. The following census in 2011 counted 121 people in 34 households. The 2016 census measured the population of the village as 90 people in 30 households.
