= Salavatabad, Bijar =

Village in Kurdistan province, Iran

Salavatabad Persian: صلوات آباد
- Village
- Location within Iran Location within Iran Kurdistan
- Coordinates: 36°00′16″N 47°32′39″E
- Country: Iran
- Province: Kurdistan
- County: Bijar
- District: Central
- Rural District: Howmeh

Population (2016)
  - Total: 100
- Time zone: UTC+3:30 (IRST)

Salavatabad (Persian: صلوات آباد) (Note: Also romanized as Şalavātābād, Şalevātābād, and Salwātābād; also known as Salāmatābād) is a village in Howmeh Rural District of the Central District in Bijar County, Kurdistan province, Iran.

== Demographics ==
=== Ethnicity ===
The village is populated by Kurds.

=== Population ===
At the time of the 2006 National Census, the village's population was 105 in 27 households. The following census in 2011 counted 110 people in 29 households. The 2016 census measured the population of the village as 100 people in 33 households.
