= Bayanlu, Kurdistan =

Village in Kurdistan province, Iran

Bayanlu Persian: بيانلو
- Village
- Location within Iran Location within Iran Kurdistan
- Coordinates: 36°00′15″N 47°51′25″E
- Country: Iran
- Province: Kurdistan
- County: Bijar
- District: Central
- Rural District: Seylatan

Population (2016)
  - Total: 478
- Time zone: UTC+3:30 (IRST)

Bayanlu (Persian: بيانلو) (Note: Also romanized as Bayanloo, Bayānlū, Beyānlū, and Biyānlu; also known as Bīanu) is a village in Seylatan Rural District of the Central District in Bijar County, Kurdistan province, Iran.

== Demographics ==
=== Ethnicity ===
The village is populated by Azerbaijanis.

=== Population ===
At the time of the 2006 National Census, the village's population was 604 in 148 households. The following census in 2011 counted 532 people in 149 households. The 2016 census measured the population of the village as 478 people in 148 households, the most populous in its rural district.
