= Homayun, Kurdistan =

Village in Kurdistan province, Iran

Homayun Persian: همايون
- Village
- Location within Iran Location within Iran Kurdistan
- Coordinates: 35°47′20″N 48°04′22″E
- Country: Iran
- Province: Kurdistan
- County: Bijar
- District: Chang Almas
- Rural District: Pir Taj

Population (2016)
  - Total: 340
- Time zone: UTC+3:30 (IRST)

Homayun (Persian: همايون) (Note: Also romanized as Homayoon and Homāyūn; also known as Ūmaīyūn and Ūmīyūn) is a village in Pir Taj Rural District of Chang Almas District in Bijar County, Kurdistan province, Iran.

== Demographics ==
=== Ethnicity ===
The village is populated by Azerbaijanis.

=== Population ===
At the time of the 2006 National Census, the village's population was 438 in 84 households. The following census in 2011 counted 410 people in 96 households. The 2016 census measured the population of the village as 340 people in 98 households.
