= Mirak, Iran =

Mirak ميرك
- Village
- Location within Iran
- Coordinates: 35°50′54″N 47°51′59″E
- Country: Iran
- Province: Kurdistan
- County: Bijar
- Bakhsh: Central
- Rural District: Khvor Khvoreh

Population (2006)
  - Total: 64
- Time zone: UTC+3:30 (IRST)
  - Summer (DST): UTC+4:30 (IRDT)

Mirak (Persian: ميرك, also Romanized as Mīrak; also known as Marīkh) is a village in Khvor Khvoreh Rural District, in the Central District of Bijar County, Kurdistan Province, Iran. At the 2006 census, its population was 64, in 16 families. The village is populated by Kurds.
