= Negarestan =

Negarestan (Persian: نگارستان) may refer to:

- Negarestan, East Azerbaijan
- Negarestan, Fars
- Negarestan Research Station, Fars Province
- Negarestan, Kurdistan
