= Choghur Qeshlaq =

Village in Kurdistan province, Iran

Choghur Qeshlaq Persian: چغورقشلاق
- Village
- Location within Iran Location within Iran Kurdistan
- Coordinates: 36°06′53″N 47°51′35″E
- Country: Iran
- Province: Kurdistan
- County: Bijar
- District: Central
- Rural District: Seylatan

Population (2016)
  - Total: 394
- Time zone: UTC+3:30 (IRST)

Choghur Qeshlaq (Persian: چغورقشلاق) (Note: Also romanized as Choghūr Qeshlāq; also known as Choqūr Qeshlāq) is a village in Seylatan Rural District of the Central District in Bijar County, Kurdistan province, Iran.

== Demographics ==
=== Ethnicity ===
The village is populated by Azerbaijanis.

=== Population ===
At the time of the 2006 National Census, the village's population was 489 in 116 households. The following census in 2011 counted 486 people in 123 households. The 2016 census measured the population of the village as 394 people in 123 households.
