= Zarrin Ju =

Zarrin Ju (Persian: زرين جو) may refer to:

- Zarrin Ju, Kermanshah
- Zarrin Ju, Kurdistan
- Zarrin Ju, Lorestan
