= Khan Baghi, Kurdistan =

Village in Kurdistan province, Iran

Khan Baghi Persian: خانباغي
- Village
- Location within Iran Location within Iran Kurdistan
- Coordinates: 35°36′36″N 47°57′02″E
- Country: Iran
- Province: Kurdistan
- County: Bijar
- District: Chang Almas
- Rural District: Babarashani

Population (2016)
  - Total: 174
- Time zone: UTC+3:30 (IRST)

Khan Baghi (Persian: خانباغي) (Note: Also romanized as Khān Bāghī and Khānbāghī) is a village in Babarashani Rural District of Chang Almas District in Bijar County, Kurdistan province, Iran.

== Demographics ==
=== Ethnicity ===
The village is populated by Kurds.

=== Population ===
At the time of the 2006 National Census, the village's population was 217 in 58 households. The following census in 2011 counted 241 people in 68 households. The 2016 census measured the population of the village as 174 people in 66 households.
