= Changiz Qaleh =

Village in Kurdistan province, Iran

Changiz Qaleh Persian: چنگيز قلعه
- Village
- Location within Iran Location within Iran Kurdistan
- Coordinates: 35°52′33″N 47°32′35″E
- Country: Iran
- Province: Kurdistan
- County: Bijar
- District: Central
- Rural District: Howmeh

Population (2016)
  - Total: 228
- Time zone: UTC+3:30 (IRST)

Changiz Qaleh (Persian: چنگيزقلعه) (Note: Also romanized as Changīz Qal‘eh) is a village in, and the capital of, Howmeh Rural District in the Central District of Bijar County, Kurdistan province, Iran.

== Demographics ==
=== Ethnicity ===
The village is populated by Kurds.

=== Population ===
At the time of the 2006 National Census, the village's population was 123 in 35 households. The following census in 2011 counted 186 people in 58 households. The 2016 census measured the population of the village as 228 people in 76 households.
