= Hoseynabad-e Kamarzard =

Village in Kurdistan province, Iran

Hoseynabad-e Kamarzard Persian: حسين آباد كمرزرد
- Village
- Location within Iran Location within Iran Kurdistan
- Coordinates: 36°00′25″N 47°29′06″E
- Country: Iran
- Province: Kurdistan
- County: Bijar
- District: Central
- Rural District: Howmeh

Population (2016)
  - Total: 122
- Time zone: UTC+3:30 (IRST)

Hoseynabad-e Kamarzard (Persian: حسين آباد كمرزرد) (Note: Also romanized as Ḩoseynābād-e Kamarzard; also known as Ḩoseynābād and Ḩoseynābād-e Zard Kamar) is a village in Howmeh Rural District of the Central District in Bijar County, Kurdistan province, Iran.

== Demographics ==
=== Ethnicity ===
The village is populated by Kurds.

=== Population ===
At the time of the 2006 National Census, the village's population was 131 in 32 households. The following census in 2011 counted 126 people in 30 households. The 2016 census measured the population of the village as 122 people in 42 households.
