= Qarah Bolagh-e Miankuh =

Qarah Bolagh-e Miankuh قره بلاغ ميانكوه
- Village
- Location within Iran
- Coordinates: 36°04′49″N 47°31′39″E
- Country: Iran
- Province: Kurdistan
- County: Bijar
- Bakhsh: Central
- Rural District: Siyah Mansur

Population (2006)
  - Total: 59
- Time zone: UTC+3:30 (IRST)
  - Summer (DST): UTC+4:30 (IRDT)

Qarah Bolagh-e Miankuh (Persian: قره بلاغ ميانكوه, also Romanized as Qarah Bolāgh-e Mīānkūh and Qareh Bolāgh-e Mīānkūh; also known as Qareh Bolāgh) is a village in Siyah Mansur Rural District, in the Central District of Bijar County, Kurdistan Province, Iran. At the 2006 census, its population was 59, in 15 families. The village is populated by Kurds.
