= Gara Choqa =

Gara Choqa or Garachoqa or Gara Cheqa or Garachqa (Persian: گراچقا) may refer to:

- Gara Choqa, Hamadan
- Gara Choqa, Nahavand, Hamadan Province
- Garachoqa, Kurdistan
