= Zeynal Khan =

Zeynal Khan or Zainal Khan (Persian: زينل خان) may refer to:

- Zeynal Khan, Kermanshah
- Zeynal Khan, Kurdistan
