= Kacheh Gonbad, Chang Almas =

Kacheh Gonbad كچه گنبد
- Village
- Location within Iran
- Coordinates: 35°42′41″N 47°59′32″E
- Country: Iran
- Province: Kurdistan
- County: Bijar
- Bakhsh: Chang Almas
- Rural District: Pir Taj

Population (2006)
  - Total: 168
- Time zone: UTC+3:30 (IRST)
  - Summer (DST): UTC+4:30 (IRDT)

Kacheh Gonbad (Persian: كچه گنبد; also known as Gacheh Gonbad, Gacheh Gunbād, and Gecheh Gonbad) is a village in Pir Taj Rural District, Chang Almas District, Bijar County, Kurdistan province, Iran. At the 2006 census, its population was 168, in 31 families. The village is populated by Azerbaijanis.
