= Khosrowabad, Kurdistan =

Village in Kurdistan province, Iran

Khosrowabad Persian: خسرو آباد
- Village
- Location within Iran Location within Iran Kurdistan
- Coordinates: 35°31′09″N 47°37′19″E
- Country: Iran
- Province: Kurdistan
- County: Bijar
- District: Chang Almas
- Rural District: Khosrowabad

Population (2016)
  - Total: 432
- Time zone: UTC+3:30 (IRST)

Khosrowabad (Persian: خسرو آباد) (Note: Also romanized as Khosrowābād; also known as Khusrauābād and Khūsrūabad) is a village in, and the capital of, Khosrowabad Rural District in Chang Almas District of Bijar County, Kurdistan province, Iran.

== Demographics ==
=== Ethnicity ===
The village is populated by Kurds.

=== Population ===
At the time of the 2006 National Census, the village's population was 510 in 129 households. The following census in 2011 counted 514 people in 147 households. The 2016 census measured the population of the village as 432 people in 148 households.
