= Zarrin Jub, Bijar =

Zarrin Jub زرين جوب
- Village
- Location within Iran
- Coordinates: 35°36′41″N 47°27′14″E
- Country: Iran
- Province: Kurdistan
- County: Bijar
- Bakhsh: Chang Almas
- Rural District: Khosrowabad

Population (2006)
  - Total: 32
- Time zone: UTC+3:30 (IRST)
  - Summer (DST): UTC+4:30 (IRDT)

Zarrin Jub (Persian: زرين جوب, also Romanized as Zarrīn Jūb; also known as Zarrīn Chūb, Zarrīn-e Jonūbī, Zarrin Janūbi, and Zarrīn Jū) is a village in Khosrowabad Rural District, Chang Almas District, Bijar County, Kurdistan Province, Iran. At the 2006 census, its population was 32, in 5 families. The village is populated by Kurds.
