= Shoushtari =

Shoushtari (Persian: شوشتری, Arabic: الشوشتري) may refer to:

- Shoushtari dialect, a Southwestern Iranian language variety
- Shoushtari, Khuzestan
- Shoushtari, Kurdistan
- Abu al-Hasan al-Shushtari 13th-century Andalusian poet
