= Qadim Khan =

Village in Kurdistan province, Iran

Qadim Khan Persian: قديم خان
- Village
- Location within Iran Location within Iran Kurdistan
- Coordinates: 35°37′27″N 47°38′31″E
- Country: Iran
- Province: Kurdistan
- County: Bijar
- District: Chang Almas
- Rural District: Khosrowabad

Population (2016)
  - Total: 139
- Time zone: UTC+3:30 (IRST)

Qadim Khan (Persian: قديم خان) (Note: Also romanized as Qadīm Khān) is a village in Khosrowabad Rural District of Chang Almas District in Bijar County, Kurdistan province, Iran.

== Demographics ==
=== Ethnicity ===
The village is populated by Kurds.

=== Population ===
At the time of the 2006 National Census, the village's population was 170 in 39 households. The following census in 2011 counted 150 people in 45 households. The 2016 census measured the population of the village as 139 people in 49 households.
