= Qezel Kand-e Olya =

Qezel Kand-e Olya قزل كند عليا
- Village
- Location within Iran
- Coordinates: 36°06′45″N 47°37′18″E
- Country: Iran
- Province: Kurdistan
- County: Bijar
- Bakhsh: Central
- Rural District: Seylatan

Population (2006)
  - Total: 109
- Time zone: UTC+3:30 (IRST)
  - Summer (DST): UTC+4:30 (IRDT)

Qezel Kand-e Olya (Persian: قزل كند عليا, also Romanized as Qezel Kand-e ‘Olyā; also known as Qezel Kand) is a village in Seylatan Rural District, in the Central District of Bijar County, Kurdistan Province, Iran. At the 2006 census, its population was 109, in 29 families. The village is populated by Azerbaijanis with a Kurdish minority.
