= Qara Tavareh =

Village in Kurdistan province, Iran

Qara Tavareh Persian: قراطوره
- Village
- Location within Iran Location within Iran Kurdistan
- Coordinates: 35°48′21″N 47°27′25″E
- Country: Iran
- Province: Kurdistan
- County: Bijar
- District: Central
- Rural District: Howmeh

Population (2016)
  - Total: 100
- Time zone: UTC+3:30 (IRST)

Qara Tavareh (Persian: قراطوره) (Note: Also romanized as Qarā Ţavareh and Qarāţūreh; also known as Qarah Ţūreh and Qareh Tūreh) is a village in Howmeh Rural District of the Central District in Bijar County, Kurdistan province, Iran.

== Demographics ==
=== Ethnicity ===
The village is populated by Kurds.

=== Population ===
At the time of the 2006 National Census, the village's population was 141 in 42 households. The following census in 2011 counted 117 people in 37 households. The 2016 census measured the population of the village as 100 people in 35 households.
