= Shebertu =

Village in Kurdistan province, Iran

Shebertu Persian: شبرتو
- Village
- Location within Iran Location within Iran Kurdistan
- Coordinates: 35°43′24″N 47°40′31″E
- Country: Iran
- Province: Kurdistan
- County: Bijar
- District: Chang Almas
- Rural District: Babarashani

Population (2016)
  - Total: 106
- Time zone: UTC+3:30 (IRST)

Shebertu (Persian: شبرتو) (Note: Also romanized as Shebertū) is a village in Babarashani Rural District of Chang Almas District in Bijar County, Kurdistan province, Iran.

== Demographics ==
=== Ethnicity ===
The village is populated by Kurds.

=== Population ===
At the time of the 2006 National Census, the village's population was 137 in 35 households. The following census in 2011 counted 159 people in 52 households. The 2016 census measured the population of the village as 106 people in 37 households.
