= Khvodlan =

Village in Kurdistan province, Iran

Khvodlan Persian: خودلان
- Village
- Location within Iran Location within Iran Kurdistan
- Coordinates: 35°34′33″N 47°31′40″E
- Country: Iran
- Province: Kurdistan
- County: Bijar
- District: Chang Almas
- Rural District: Khosrowabad

Population (2016)
  - Total: 221
- Time zone: UTC+3:30 (IRST)

Khvodlan (Persian: خودلان) (Note: Also romanized as Khvodlān) is a village in Khosrowabad Rural District of Chang Almas District in Bijar County, Kurdistan province, Iran.

== Demographics ==
=== Ethnicity ===
The village is populated by Kurds.

=== Population ===
At the time of the 2006 National Census, the village's population was 368 in 85 households. The following census in 2011 counted 326 people in 79 households. The 2016 census measured the population of the village as 221 people in 75 households.
