= Dar Ghias =

Village in Kurdistan province, Iran

Dar Ghias Persian: دارغياث
- Village
- Location within Iran Location within Iran Kurdistan
- Coordinates: 35°42′12″N 47°43′36″E
- Country: Iran
- Province: Kurdistan
- County: Bijar
- District: Chang Almas
- Rural District: Babarashani

Population (2016)
  - Total: 280
- Time zone: UTC+3:30 (IRST)

Dar Ghias (Persian: دارغياث) (Note: Also romanized as Dar Gheyās̄ and Dār Ghīās̄; also known as Dār Qīyes, Darreh Qanās, Darreh Qīās, and Darreh Qīyās) is a village in Babarashani Rural District of Chang Almas District in Bijar County, Kurdistan province, Iran.

== Demographics ==
=== Ethnicity ===
The village is populated by Kurds.

=== Population ===
At the time of the 2006 National Census, the village's population was 256 in 66 households. The following census in 2011 counted 365 people in 118 households. The 2016 census measured the population of the village as 280 people in 93 households.
