= Now Bahar, Bijar =

Village in Kurdistan province, Iran

Now Bahar Persian: نوبهار
- Village
- Location within Iran Location within Iran Kurdistan
- Coordinates: 35°47′56″N 47°12′19″E
- Country: Iran
- Province: Kurdistan
- County: Bijar
- District: Central
- Rural District: Najafabad

Population (2016)
  - Total: 268
- Time zone: UTC+3:30 (IRST)

Now Bahar (Persian: نوبهار) (Note: Also romanized as Now Bahār) is a village in Najafabad Rural District of the Central District in Bijar County, Kurdistan province, Iran.

== Demographics ==
=== Ethnicity ===
The village is populated by Kurds.

=== Population ===
At the time of the 2006 National Census, the village's population was 300 in 61 households. The following census in 2011 counted 287 people in 68 households. The 2016 census measured the population of the village as 268 people in 78 households.
