= Qezel Ali =

Village in Kurdistan province, Iran

Qezel Ali Persian: قزل علي
- Village
- Location within Iran Location within Iran Kurdistan
- Coordinates: 35°55′57″N 47°41′17″E
- Country: Iran
- Province: Kurdistan
- County: Bijar
- District: Central
- Rural District: Khvor Khvoreh

Population (2016)
  - Total: 127
- Time zone: UTC+3:30 (IRST)

Qezel Ali (Persian: قزل علي) (Note: Also romanized as Qezel ‘Alī; also known as Qal‘eh Khān-e Qezī Khānom and Qizil ‘Ali) is a village in Khvor Khvoreh Rural District of the Central District in Bijar County, Kurdistan province, Iran.

== Demographics ==
=== Ethnicity ===
The village is populated by Kurds with an Azerbaijani minority.

=== Population ===
At the time of the 2006 National Census, the village's population was 178 in 39 households. The following census in 2011 counted 152 people in 43 households. The 2016 census measured the population of the village as 127 people in 38 households.
