= Qarah Palchuq =

Village in Kurdistan province, Iran

Qarah Palchuq Persian: قره پالچوق
- Village
- Location within Iran Location within Iran Kurdistan
- Coordinates: 35°57′55″N 47°51′09″E
- Country: Iran
- Province: Kurdistan
- County: Bijar
- District: Central
- Rural District: Khvor Khvoreh

Population (2016)
  - Total: 127
- Time zone: UTC+3:30 (IRST)

Qarah Palchuq (Persian: قره پالچوق) (Note: Also romanized as Qarah Pālchūq and Qareh Pālchūq) is a village in Khvor Khvoreh Rural District of the Central District in Bijar County, Kurdistan province, Iran.

== Demographics ==
=== Ethnicity ===
The village is populated by Kurds with an Azerbaijani minority.

=== Population ===
At the time of the 2006 National Census, the village's population was 200 in 50 households. The following census in 2011 counted 166 people in 52 households. The 2016 census measured the population of the village as 127 people in 50 households.
