= Qerkhlar, Kurdistan =

Village in Kurdistan province, Iran

Qerkhlar Persian: قرخلر
- Village
- Location within Iran Location within Iran Kurdistan
- Coordinates: 35°36′27″N 47°28′01″E
- Country: Iran
- Province: Kurdistan
- County: Bijar
- District: Chang Almas
- Rural District: Khosrowabad

Population (2016)
  - Total: 132
- Time zone: UTC+3:30 (IRST)

Qerkhlar (Persian: قرخلر) (Note: Also romanized as Qerekhlar; also known as Kilār) is a village in Khosrowabad Rural District of Chang Almas District in Bijar County, Kurdistan province, Iran.

== Demographics ==
=== Ethnicity ===
The village is populated by Kurds.

=== Population ===
At the time of the 2006 National Census, the village's population was 271 in 58 households. The following census in 2011 counted 207 people in 58 households. The 2016 census measured the population of the village as 132 people in 41 households.
