= Gol Bolagh-e Sofla =

Gol Bolagh-e Sofla گلبلاغ سفلي
- Village
- Location within Iran
- Coordinates: 35°44′14″N 47°34′09″E
- Country: Iran
- Province: Kurdistan
- County: Bijar
- Bakhsh: Central
- Rural District: Howmeh

Population (2006)
  - Total: 25
- Time zone: UTC+3:30 (IRST)
  - Summer (DST): UTC+4:30 (IRDT)

Gol Bolagh-e Sofla (Persian: گلبلاغ سفلي, also Romanized as Gol Bolāgh-e Soflá and Golbāgh-e Soflá; also known as Gol Bolāgh, Golbolāgh-e Pā’īn, Kal Būlāgh, and Kalbulāq) is a village in Howmeh Rural District, in the Central District of Bijar County, Kurdistan Province, Iran. At the 2006 census, its population was 25, in 9 families. The village is populated by Kurds.
