= Kahriz, Kurdistan =

Village in Kurdistan province, Iran

Kahriz Persian: كهريز
- Village
- Location within Iran Location within Iran Kurdistan
- Coordinates: 35°41′16″N 47°53′22″E
- Country: Iran
- Province: Kurdistan
- County: Bijar
- District: Chang Almas
- Rural District: Babarashani

Population (2016)
  - Total: 196
- Time zone: UTC+3:30 (IRST)

Kahriz (Persian: كهريز) (Note: Also romanized as Kahrīz; also known as Kahrīz-e Khān Bābā Khān and Kārīz) is a village in Babarashani Rural District of Chang Almas District in Bijar County, Kurdistan province, Iran.

== Demographics ==
=== Ethnicity ===
The village is populated by Kurds with an Azerbaijani minority.

=== Population ===
At the time of the 2006 National Census, the village's population was 312 in 61 households. The following census in 2011 counted 278 people in 74 households. The 2016 census measured the population of the village as 196 people in 65 households.
