= Seyyed Hoseyn, Kurdistan =

Village in Kurdistan province, Iran

Seyyed Hoseyn Persian: سيدحسين
- Village
- Location within Iran Location within Iran Kurdistan
- Coordinates: 36°09′33″N 47°47′43″E
- Country: Iran
- Province: Kurdistan
- County: Bijar
- District: Central
- Rural District: Seylatan

Population (2016)
  - Total: 135
- Time zone: UTC+3:30 (IRST)

Seyyed Hoseyn (Persian: سيدحسين) (Note: Also romanized as Seyyed Ḩoseyn) is a village in Seylatan Rural District of the Central District in Bijar County, Kurdistan province, Iran.

== Demographics ==
=== Ethnicity ===
The village is populated by Azerbaijanis.

=== Population ===
At the time of the 2006 National Census, the village's population was 167 in 46 households. The following census in 2011 counted 152 people in 49 households. The 2016 census measured the population of the village as 135 people in 43 households.
