= Soltanabad-e Darreh Viran =

Village in Kurdistan province, Iran

Soltanabad-e Darreh Viran Persian: سلطان آباد دره ويران
- Village
- Location within Iran Location within Iran Kurdistan
- Coordinates: 36°03′26″N 47°41′54″E
- Country: Iran
- Province: Kurdistan
- County: Bijar
- District: Central
- Rural District: Seylatan

Population (2016)
  - Total: 134
- Time zone: UTC+3:30 (IRST)

Soltanabad-e Darreh Viran (Persian: سلطان آباد دره ويران) (Note: Also romanized as Solţānābād-e Darreh Vīrān) is a village in Seylatan Rural District of the Central District in Bijar County, Kurdistan province, Iran.

== Demographics ==
=== Ethnicity ===
The village is populated by Azerbaijanis.

=== Population ===
At the time of the 2006 National Census, the village's population was 122 in 32 households. The following census in 2011 counted 126 people in 38 households. The 2016 census measured the population of the village as 134 people in 39 households.
