= Cheshmeh Rubah =

Village in Kurdistan province, Iran

Cheshmeh Rubah Persian: چشمه روباه
- Village
- Location within Iran Location within Iran Kurdistan
- Coordinates: 35°31′42″N 47°39′47″E
- Country: Iran
- Province: Kurdistan
- County: Bijar
- District: Chang Almas
- Rural District: Khosrowabad

Population (2016)
  - Total: 193
- Time zone: UTC+3:30 (IRST)

Cheshmeh Rubah (Persian: چشمه روباه) (Note: Also romanized as Chashmeh Rūbāh and Cheshmeh Rūbāh; also known as Chashmeh Rībāt, Cheshmeh Robāţ, and Rūbāh) is a village in Khosrowabad Rural District of Chang Almas District in Bijar County, Kurdistan province, Iran.

== Demographics ==
=== Ethnicity ===
The village is populated by Kurds.

=== Population ===
At the time of the 2006 National Census, the village's population was 237 in 58 households. The following census in 2011 counted 217 people in 60 households. The 2016 census measured the population of the village as 193 people in 58 households.
