= Mirak =

Mirak may refer to:

- Mirak Bahadur Jalair, Mughal sardar of Sylhet
- Mirak (Star Fleet Universe), a race of beings in Star Fleet Universe
- Mirak, Armenia, a town in Armenia
- Mirək, a village in Azerbaijan
- Mirak, Iran, a village in Kurdistan Province, Iran
- Mirak, Kermanshah, a village in Kermanshah Province, Iran
- Epsilon Boötis, a star also called Mirak
- Mirak (rocket), a rocket developed by the German Verein für Raumschiffahrt in the early 1930s

== See also ==
- Miraka (disambiguation)
