= Cheshmeh Mantash =

Village in Kurdistan province, Iran

Cheshmeh Mantash Persian: چشمه منتش
- Village
- Location within Iran Location within Iran Kurdistan
- Coordinates: 35°36′55″N 47°28′58″E
- Country: Iran
- Province: Kurdistan
- County: Bijar
- District: Chang Almas
- Rural District: Khosrowabad

Population (2016)
  - Total: 876
- Time zone: UTC+3:30 (IRST)

Cheshmeh Mantash (Persian: چشمه منتش) (Note: Also romanized as Chashmeh Mantash; also known as Chashmeh Mantas, Cheshmeh Mansh, and Cheshmeh Mīsh) is a village in Khosrowabad Rural District of Chang Almas District in Bijar County, Kurdistan province, Iran.

== Demographics ==
=== Ethnicity ===
The village is populated by Kurds.

=== Population ===
At the time of the 2006 National Census, the village's population was 1,012 in 228 households. The following census in 2011 counted 936 people in 275 households. The 2016 census measured the population of the village as 876 people in 250 households, the most populous in its rural district.
