= Gol Bolagh =

Gol Bolagh or Golbolagh (Persian: گل بلاغ) may refer to:

- Gol Bolagh, Kurdistan
- Gol Bolagh, Howmeh, Kurdistan Province
- Gol Bolagh, Zanjan
