= Qezel Kand-e Sofla =

Qezel Kand-e Sofla قزل كند سفلي
- Village
- Location within Iran
- Coordinates: 36°06′49″N 47°37′49″E
- Country: Iran
- Province: Kurdistan
- County: Bijar
- Bakhsh: Central
- Rural District: Seylatan

Population (2006)
  - Total: 95
- Time zone: UTC+3:30 (IRST)
  - Summer (DST): UTC+4:30 (IRDT)

Qezel Kand-e Sofla (Persian: قزل كند سفلي, also Romanized as Qezel Kand-e Soflá) is a village in Seylatan Rural District, in the Central District of Bijar County, Kurdistan Province, Iran. At the 2006 census, its population was 95, in 21 families. The village is populated by Azerbaijanis with a Kurdish minority.
