= Mohammadabad-e Nil =

Village in Kurdistan province, Iran

Mohammadabad-e Nil Persian: محمد آباد نيل
- Village
- Location within Iran Location within Iran Kurdistan
- Coordinates: 35°36′11″N 47°25′41″E
- Country: Iran
- Province: Kurdistan
- County: Bijar
- District: Chang Almas
- Rural District: Khosrowabad

Population (2016)
  - Total: 197
- Time zone: UTC+3:30 (IRST)

Mohammadabad-e Nil (Persian: محمد آباد نيل) (Note: Also romanized as Moḩammadābād-e Nīl; also known as Moḩammadābād and Nīl) is a village in Khosrowabad Rural District of Chang Almas District in Bijar County, Kurdistan province, Iran.

== Demographics ==
=== Ethnicity ===
The village is populated by Kurds.

=== Population ===
At the time of the 2006 National Census, the village's population was 286 in 63 households. The following census in 2011 counted 209 people in 57 households. The 2016 census measured the population of the village as 197 people in 57 households.
