= Jafarabad, Bijar =

Village in Kurdistan province, Iran

Jafarabad Persian: جعفر آباد
- Village
- Location within Iran Location within Iran Kurdistan
- Coordinates: 36°11′38″N 47°17′25″E
- Country: Iran
- Province: Kurdistan
- County: Bijar
- District: Central
- Rural District: Siyah Mansur

Population (2016)
  - Total: 558
- Time zone: UTC+3:30 (IRST)

Jafarabad (Persian: جعفر آباد) (Note: Also romanized as Ja‘farābād) is a village in, and the capital of, Siyah Mansur Rural District in the Central District of Bijar County, Kurdistan province, Iran.

== Demographics ==
=== Ethnicity ===
The village is populated by Kurds with an Azerbaijani minority.

=== Population ===
At the time of the 2006 National Census, the village's population was 698 in 165 households. The following census in 2011 counted 694 people in 168 households. The 2016 census measured the population of the village as 558 people in 193 households, the most populous in its rural district.
