= Qazan Qarah =

Village in Kurdistan province, Iran

Qazan Qarah Persian: قزانقره
- Village
- Location within Iran Location within Iran Kurdistan
- Coordinates: 35°39′43″N 48°04′56″E
- Country: Iran
- Province: Kurdistan
- County: Bijar
- District: Chang Almas
- Rural District: Pir Taj

Population (2016)
  - Total: 370
- Time zone: UTC+3:30 (IRST)

Qazan Qarah (Persian: قزانقره) (Note: Also romanized as Qāzān Qarah and Qazān Qareh; also known as Kazangār) is a village in Pir Taj Rural District of Chang Almas District in Bijar County, Kurdistan province, Iran.

== Demographics ==
=== Ethnicity ===
The village is populated by Azerbaijanis.

=== Population ===
At the time of the 2006 National Census, the village's population was 459 in 91 households. The following census in 2011 counted 422 people in 120 households. The 2016 census measured the population of the village as 370 people in 117 households.
