= Shir Kosh-e Olya =

Village in Kurdistan province, Iran

Shir Kosh-e Olya Persian: شيركش عليا
- Village
- Location within Iran Location within Iran Kurdistan
- Coordinates: 35°40′52″N 47°17′33″E
- Country: Iran
- Province: Kurdistan
- County: Bijar
- District: Central
- Rural District: Najafabad

Population (2016)
  - Total: 156
- Time zone: UTC+3:30 (IRST)

Shir Kosh-e Olya (Persian: شيركش عليا) (Note: Also romanized as Shīr Kosh-e ‘Olyā and Shīrkosh-e ‘Olyā; also known as Shīr Kosh and Shīrkesh) is a village in Najafabad Rural District of the Central District in Bijar County, Kurdistan province, Iran.

== Demographics ==
=== Ethnicity ===
The village is populated by Kurds.

=== Population ===
At the time of the 2006 National Census, the village's population was 242 in 50 households. The following census in 2011 counted 207 people in 53 households. The 2016 census measured the population of the village as 156 people in 45 households.
