= Negarestan, Kurdistan =

Negarestan نگارستان
- Village
- Location within Iran
- Coordinates: 35°50′34″N 47°46′03″E
- Country: Iran
- Province: Kurdistan
- County: Bijar
- Bakhsh: Central
- Rural District: Khvor Khvoreh

Population (2006)
  - Total: 88
- Time zone: UTC+3:30 (IRST)
  - Summer (DST): UTC+4:30 (IRDT)

Negarestan (Persian: نگارستان, also Romanized as Negārestān; also known as Neqārestān and Nīgār Husaīn) is a village in Khvor Khvoreh Rural District, in the Central District of Bijar County, Kurdistan Province, Iran. At the 2006 census, its population was 88, in 21 families. The village is populated by Kurds.
