= Shoushtari, Kurdistan =

Shushtari شوشتري
- Village
- Location within Iran
- Coordinates: 35°40′19″N 47°44′38″E
- Country: Iran
- Province: Kurdistan
- County: Bijar
- Bakhsh: Chang Almas
- Rural District: Babarashani

Population (2006)
  - Total: 69
- Time zone: UTC+3:30 (IRST)
  - Summer (DST): UTC+4:30 (IRDT)

Shoushtari (Persian: شوشتري, also Romanized as Shūshtarī; also known as Sūshtārīn) is a village in Babarashani Rural District, Chang Almas District, Bijar County, Kurdistan Province, Iran. At the 2006 census, its population was 69, in 20 families. The village is populated by Kurds.
