= Hesar Sefid, Kurdistan =

Village in Kurdistan province, Iran

Hesar Sefid Persian: حصارسفيد
- Village
- Location within Iran Location within Iran Kurdistan
- Coordinates: 35°47′56″N 47°11′02″E
- Country: Iran
- Province: Kurdistan
- County: Bijar
- District: Central
- Rural District: Najafabad

Population (2016)
  - Total: 217
- Time zone: UTC+3:30 (IRST)

Hesar Sefid (Persian: حصارسفيد) (Note: Also romanized as Ḩeşār Sefīd; also known as 'Abbāsābād, Hisār Sefīd, and Hisār Sefrd) is a village in Najafabad Rural District of the Central District in Bijar County, Kurdistan province, Iran.

== Demographics ==
=== Ethnicity ===
The village is populated by Kurds.

=== Population ===
At the time of the 2006 National Census, the village's population was 288 in 60 households. The following census in 2011 counted 242 people in 58 households. The 2016 census measured the population of the village as 217 people in 57 households.
