= Alagoz, Iran =

Alagoz الاگز
- Village
- Location within Iran
- Coordinates: 36°01′31″N 47°40′40″E
- Country: Iran
- Province: Kurdistan
- County: Bijar
- Bakhsh: Central
- Rural District: Khvor Khvoreh

Population (2006)
  - Total: 15
- Time zone: UTC+3:30 (IRST)
  - Summer (DST): UTC+4:30 (IRDT)

Alagoz (Persian: الاگز, also Romanized as Ālāgoz; also known as Ālāgan and ‘Alāvīz) is a village in Khvor Khvoreh Rural District, in the Central District of Bijar County, Kurdistan Province, Iran. At the 2006 census, its population was 15, in 4 families. The village is populated by Kurds.
