= Zardeh Kamar =

Village in Kurdistan province, Iran

Zardeh Kamar Persian: زرده كمر
- Village
- Location within Iran Location within Iran Kurdistan
- Coordinates: 35°54′13″N 47°20′36″E
- Country: Iran
- Province: Kurdistan
- County: Bijar
- District: Central
- Rural District: Howmeh

Population (2016)
  - Total: 219
- Time zone: UTC+3:30 (IRST)

Zardeh Kamar (Persian: زرده كمر) (Note: Also known as Sard Qamar, Zard Kamar, and Zard-ī-Qamar) is a village in Howmeh Rural District of the Central District in Bijar County, Kurdistan province, Iran.

== Demographics ==
=== Ethnicity ===
The village is populated by Kurds.

=== Population ===
At the time of the 2006 National Census, the village's population was 219 in 52 households. The following census in 2011 counted 218 people in 57 households. The 2016 census measured the population of the village as 219 people in 65 households.
