= Bargoshad, Kurdistan =

Bargoshad برگشاد
- Village
- Location within Iran
- Coordinates: 35°43′28″N 47°15′24″E
- Country: Iran
- Province: Kurdistan
- County: Bijar
- Bakhsh: Central
- Rural District: Najafabad

Population (2006)
  - Total: 146
- Time zone: UTC+3:30 (IRST)
  - Summer (DST): UTC+4:30 (IRDT)

Bargoshad (Persian: برگشاد, also Romanized as Bargoshād and Bargshād; also known as Barkshād) is a village in Najafabad Rural District, in the Central District of Bijar County, Kurdistan province, Iran. At the 2006 census, its population was 146, in 30 families. The village is populated by Kurds.
