= Qeshlaq-e Khaneh =

Village in Kurdistan province, Iran

Qeshlaq-e Khaneh Persian: قشلاق خانه
- Village
- Location within Iran Location within Iran Kurdistan
- Coordinates: 35°58′35″N 47°47′22″E
- Country: Iran
- Province: Kurdistan
- County: Bijar
- District: Central
- Rural District: Khvor Khvoreh

Population (2016)
  - Total: 137
- Time zone: UTC+3:30 (IRST)

Qeshlaq-e Khaneh (Persian: قشلاق خانه) (Note: Also romanized as Qeshlāq-e Khāneh) is a village in Khvor Khvoreh Rural District of the Central District in Bijar County, Kurdistan province, Iran.

== Demographics ==
=== Population ===
At the time of the 2006 National Census, the village's population was below the reporting threshold. The following census in 2011 counted 138 people in 40 households. The 2016 census measured the population of the village as 137 people in 43 households.
