= Chowljeh =

Village in Kurdistan province, Iran

Chowljeh Persian: چولجه
- Village
- Location within Iran Location within Iran Kurdistan
- Coordinates: 35°51′18″N 47°55′32″E
- Country: Iran
- Province: Kurdistan
- County: Bijar
- District: Central
- Rural District: Khvor Khvoreh

Population (2016)
  - Total: 231
- Time zone: UTC+3:30 (IRST)

Chowljeh (Persian: چولجه) is a village in Khvor Khvoreh Rural District of the Central District in Bijar County, Kurdistan province, Iran.

== Demographics ==
=== Ethnicity ===
The village is populated by Kurds.

=== Population ===
At the time of the 2006 National Census, the village's population was 328 in 68 households. The following census in 2011 counted 250 people in 71 households. The 2016 census measured the population of the village as 231 people in 67 households.
