= Kolucheh =

Kolucheh or Kallucheh or Kaloocheh or Kelucheh (Persian: كلوچه) may refer to:

- Kolucheh, East Azerbaijan
- Kolucheh, Kermanshah
- Kolucheh, Kurdistan
- Kolucheh, Zanjan
