= Qeshlaq-e Nowruz =

Village in Kurdistan province, Iran

Qeshlaq-e Nowruz Persian: قشلاق نوروز
- Village
- Location within Iran Location within Iran Kurdistan
- Coordinates: 35°43′07″N 47°27′34″E
- Country: Iran
- Province: Kurdistan
- County: Bijar
- District: Central
- Rural District: Howmeh

Population (2016)
  - Total: 427
- Time zone: UTC+3:30 (IRST)

Qeshlaq-e Nowruz (Persian: قشلاق نوروز) (Note: Also romanized as Qeshlāq Nowrūz, Qeshlāq-e Now Rūz, and Qeshlāq-e Nowrūz; also known as Qishlāq Naurūz) is a village in Howmeh Rural District of the Central District in Bijar County, Kurdistan province, Iran.

== Demographics ==
=== Ethnicity ===
The village is populated by Kurds.

=== Population ===
At the time of the 2006 National Census, the village's population was 517 in 106 households. The following census in 2011 counted 461 people in 126 households. The 2016 census measured the population of the village as 427 people in 123 households.
