= Cheshmeh Kureh, Kurdistan =

Village in Kurdistan province, Iran

Cheshmeh Kureh Persian: چشمه كوره
- Village
- Location within Iran Location within Iran Kurdistan
- Coordinates: 35°52′26″N 47°50′17″E
- Country: Iran
- Province: Kurdistan
- County: Bijar
- District: Central
- Rural District: Khvor Khvoreh

Population (2016)
  - Total: 165
- Time zone: UTC+3:30 (IRST)

Cheshmeh Kureh (Persian: چشمه كوره) (Note: Also romanized as Chashmeh Kūreh and Cheshmeh Kūreh; also known as Chashmeh Kūra) is a village in Khvor Khvoreh Rural District of the Central District in Bijar County, Kurdistan province, Iran.

== Demographics ==
=== Ethnicity ===
The village is populated by Kurds.

=== Population ===
At the time of the 2006 National Census, the village's population was 184 in 40 households. The following census in 2011 counted 169 people in 43 households. The 2016 census measured the population of the village as 165 people in 53 households.
