= Mehrabad, Kurdistan =

Village in Kurdistan province, Iran

Mehrabad Persian: مهر آباد
- Village
- Location within Iran Location within Iran Kurdistan
- Coordinates: 35°51′44″N 47°53′37″E
- Country: Iran
- Province: Kurdistan
- County: Bijar
- District: Central
- Rural District: Khvor Khvoreh

Population (2016)
  - Total: 132
- Time zone: UTC+3:30 (IRST)

Mehrabad (Persian: مهر آباد) (Note: Also romanized as Mehrābād) is a village in Khvor Khvoreh Rural District of the Central District in Bijar County, Kurdistan province, Iran.

== Demographics ==
=== Ethnicity ===
The village is populated by Kurds.

=== Population ===
At the time of the 2006 National Census, the village's population was 164 in 37 households. The following census in 2011 counted 143 people in 43 households. The 2016 census measured the population of the village as 132 people in 42 households.
