= Baba Nazar, Kurdistan =

Baba Nazar بابانظر
- Village
- Location within Iran
- Coordinates: 35°47′46″N 47°20′15″E
- Country: Iran
- Province: Kurdistan
- County: Bijar
- Bakhsh: Central
- Rural District: Najafabad

Population (2006)
  - Total: 107
- Time zone: UTC+3:30 (IRST)
  - Summer (DST): UTC+4:30 (IRDT)

Baba Nazar (Persian: بابانظر, also Romanized as Bābā Naz̧ar; also known as Şabā Neyzār and Sabānīzār) is a village in Najafabad Rural District, in the Central District of Bijar County, Kurdistan province, Iran. At the 2006 census, its population was 107, in 29 families. The village is populated by Kurds.
