= Khvor Khvoreh, Bijar =

Village in Kurdistan province, Iran

Khvor Khvoreh Persian: خورخوره
- Village
- Location within Iran Location within Iran Kurdistan
- Coordinates: 35°57′44″N 47°48′41″E
- Country: Iran
- Province: Kurdistan
- County: Bijar
- District: Central
- Rural District: Khvor Khvoreh

Population (2016)
  - Total: 727
- Time zone: UTC+3:30 (IRST)

Khvor Khvoreh (Persian: خورخوره) (Note: Also romanized as Khowr Khowreh, Khowrkhowreh, and Khūr Khūreh; also known as Khoorkhoreh and Khorkhoreh) is a village in, and the capital of, Khvor Khvoreh Rural District in the Central District of Bijar County, Kurdistan province, Iran.

== Demographics ==
=== Ethnicity ===
The village is populated by Kurds with an Azerbaijani minority.

=== Population ===
At the time of the 2006 National Census, the village's population was 872 in 180 households. The following census in 2011 counted 757 people in 217 households. The 2016 census measured the population of the village as 727 people in 219 households.
