= Amirabad, Bijar =

Village in Kurdistan province, Iran

Amirabad Persian: امير آباد
- Village
- Location within Iran Location within Iran Kurdistan
- Coordinates: 35°53′25″N 47°17′51″E
- Country: Iran
- Province: Kurdistan
- County: Bijar
- District: Central
- Rural District: Najafabad

Population (2016)
  - Total: 152
- Time zone: UTC+3:30 (IRST)

Amirabad (Persian: امير آباد) (Note: Also romanized as Amīrābād; also known as Amīrāwa) is a village in Najafabad Rural District of the Central District in Bijar County, Kurdistan province, Iran.

== Demographics ==
=== Ethnicity ===
The village is populated by Kurds.

=== Population ===
At the time of the 2006 National Census, the village's population was 143 in 37 households. The following census in 2011 counted 149 people in 42 households. The 2016 census measured the population of the village as 152 people in 45 households.
