= Gowjeh Kand =

Village in Kurdistan province, Iran

Gowjeh Kand Persian: گوجه كند
- Village
- Location within Iran Location within Iran Kurdistan
- Coordinates: 35°36′07″N 47°47′09″E
- Country: Iran
- Province: Kurdistan
- County: Bijar
- District: Chang Almas
- Rural District: Babarashani

Population (2016)
  - Total: 141
- Time zone: UTC+3:30 (IRST)

Gowjeh Kand (Persian: گوجه كند) (Note: Also known as Kūjākand) is a village in Babarashani Rural District of Chang Almas District in Bijar County, Kurdistan province, Iran.

== Demographics ==
=== Ethnicity ===
The village is populated by Kurds.

=== Population ===
At the time of the 2006 National Census, the village's population was 153 in 36 households. The following census in 2011 counted 138 people in 41 households. The 2016 census measured the population of the village as 141 people in 40 households.
