= Jebreil =

Village in Kurdistan province, Iran

Jebreil Persian: جبرئيل
- Village
- Location within Iran Location within Iran Kurdistan
- Coordinates: 35°39′45″N 47°57′18″E
- Country: Iran
- Province: Kurdistan
- County: Bijar
- District: Chang Almas
- Rural District: Babarashani

Population (2016)
  - Total: 336
- Time zone: UTC+3:30 (IRST)

Jebreil (Persian: جبرئيل) (Note: Also romanized as Jabrā’īl, Jebrā’īl, and Jebre’īl; also known as Jībrā‘il) is a village in Babarashani Rural District of Chang Almas District in Bijar County, Kurdistan province, Iran.

== Demographics ==
=== Ethnicity ===
The village is populated by Kurds, with an Azerbaijani minority.

=== Population ===
At the time of the 2006 National Census, the village's population was 567 in 126 households. The following census in 2011 counted 414 people in 116 households. The 2016 census measured the population of the village as 336 people in 107 households, the most populous in its rural district.
