= Khvosh Maqam =

Village in Kurdistan province, Iran

Khvosh Maqam Persian: خوش مقام
- Village
- Location within Iran Location within Iran Kurdistan
- Coordinates: 36°09′51″N 47°21′07″E
- Country: Iran
- Province: Kurdistan
- County: Bijar
- District: Central
- Rural District: Siyah Mansur

Population (2016)
  - Total: 351
- Time zone: UTC+3:30 (IRST)

Khvosh Maqam (Persian: خوش مقام) (Note: Also romanized as Khowsh Maqām, Khūshmaqām, and Khvosh Maqām; also known as Khushmagām) is a village in Siyah Mansur Rural District of the Central District in Bijar County, Kurdistan province, Iran.

== Demographics ==
=== Ethnicity ===
The village is populated by Kurds with an Azerbaijani minority.

=== Population ===
At the time of the 2006 National Census, the village's population was 490 in 107 households. The following census in 2011 counted 436 people in 119 households. The 2016 census measured the population of the village as 351 people in 106 households.
