= Kani Kan =

Village in Kurdistan province, Iran

Kani Kan Persian: كاني كن
- Village
- Location within Iran Location within Iran Kurdistan
- Coordinates: 35°45′28″N 47°13′36″E
- Country: Iran
- Province: Kurdistan
- County: Bijar
- District: Central
- Rural District: Najafabad

Population (2016)
  - Total: 223
- Time zone: UTC+3:30 (IRST)

Kani Kan (Persian: كاني كن) (Note: Also romanized as Kānī Kan and Kānī Kon; also known as Cheshmeh Sefīd, Kāneh Kīn, Khāneh Kīn, Khāneqayn, and Kheymeh Sefīd) is a village in Najafabad Rural District of the Central District in Bijar County, Kurdistan province, Iran.

== Demographics ==
=== Ethnicity ===
The village is populated by Kurds.

=== Population ===
At the time of the 2006 National Census, the village's population was 223 in 46 households. The following census in 2011 counted 233 people in 55 households. The 2016 census measured the population of the village as 223 people in 62 households.
