= Qezel Bolagh, Bijar =

Village in Kurdistan province, Iran

Qezel Bolagh Persian: قزل بلاغ
- Village
- Location within Iran Location within Iran Kurdistan
- Coordinates: 36°14′03″N 47°15′01″E
- Country: Iran
- Province: Kurdistan
- County: Bijar
- District: Central
- Rural District: Siyah Mansur

Population (2016)
  - Total: 164
- Time zone: UTC+3:30 (IRST)

Qezel Bolagh (Persian: قزل بلاغ) (Note: Also romanized as Qezel Bolāgh) is a village in Siyah Mansur Rural District of the Central District in Bijar County, Kurdistan province, Iran.

== Demographics ==
=== Ethnicity ===
The village is populated by Kurds with an Azerbaijani minority.

=== Population ===
At the time of the 2006 National Census, the village's population was 189 in 48 households. The following census in 2011 counted 169 people in 50 households. The 2016 census measured the population of the village as 164 people in 52 households.
