= Chehel Amiran, Chang Almas =

Chehel Amiran چهل اميران
- Village
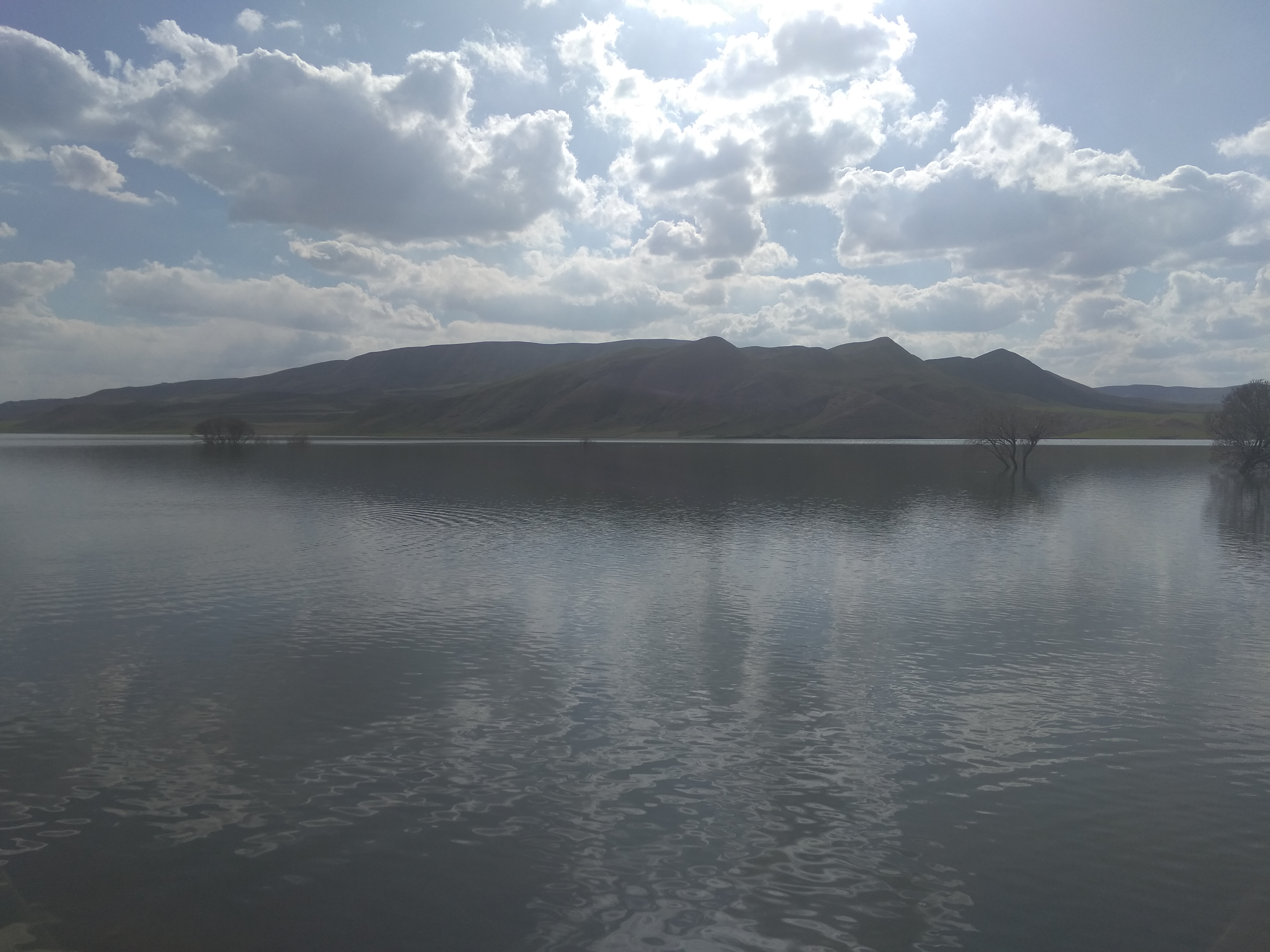
- The image of the village of Chehl Amiran Cheng Almas disappearing under the water of Talwar Dam on 5 May 2018

- Location within Iran
- Coordinates: 35°43′47″N 47°53′07″E
- Country: Iran
- Province: Kurdistan
- County: Bijar
- Bakhsh: Chang Almas
- Rural District: Babarashani

Population (2006)
  - Total: 120
- Time zone: UTC+3:30 (IRST)
  - Summer (DST): UTC+4:30 (IRDT)

Chehel Amiran (Persian: چهل اميران, also Romanized as Chehel Amīrān; also known as Chahlamīzan and Chehlān Mīzān) is a village in Babarashani Rural District, Chang Almas District, Bijar County, Kurdistan province, Iran. In 2006, its population was 120, in 27 families. The village is populated by Kurds.
