= Khorramabad, Kurdistan =

Village in Kurdistan province, Iran

Khorramabad Persian: خرم آباد
- Village
- Location within Iran Location within Iran Kurdistan
- Coordinates: 35°44′22″N 47°30′13″E
- Country: Iran
- Province: Kurdistan
- County: Bijar
- District: Central
- Rural District: Howmeh

Population (2016)
  - Total: 120
- Time zone: UTC+3:30 (IRST)

Khorramabad (Persian: خرم آباد) (Note: Also romanized as Khorramābād; also known as Khoramābād-e Ommīdkānī, Khorzmābād, and Sakānī) is a village in Howmeh Rural District of the Central District in Bijar County, Kurdistan province, Iran.

== Demographics ==
=== Ethnicity ===
The village is populated by Kurds.

=== Population ===
At the time of the 2006 National Census, the village's population was 176 in 40 households. The following census in 2011 counted 154 people in 42 households. The 2016 census measured the population of the village as 120 people in 40 households.
