= Aliabad, Siyah Mansur =

Village in Kurdistan province, Iran

Aliabad Persian: علي آباد
- Village
- Location within Iran Location within Iran Kurdistan
- Coordinates: 36°08′20″N 47°25′38″E
- Country: Iran
- Province: Kurdistan
- County: Bijar
- District: Central
- Rural District: Siyah Mansur

Population (2016)
  - Total: 195
- Time zone: UTC+3:30 (IRST)

Aliabad (Persian: علي آباد) (Note: Also romanized as ‘Alīābād) is a village in Siyah Mansur Rural District of the Central District in Bijar County, Kurdistan province, Iran.

== Demographics ==
=== Ethnicity ===
The village is populated by Kurds.

=== Population ===
At the time of the 2006 National Census, the village's population was 230 in 49 households. The following census in 2011 counted 246 people in 73 households. The 2016 census measured the population of the village as 195 people in 67 households.
