= Cheshmeh Sangin =

Village in Kurdistan province, Iran

Cheshmeh Sangin Persian: چشمه سنگين
- Village
- Location within Iran Location within Iran Kurdistan
- Coordinates: 36°02′53″N 47°37′24″E
- Country: Iran
- Province: Kurdistan
- County: Bijar
- District: Central
- Rural District: Seylatan

Population (2016)
  - Total: 117
- Time zone: UTC+3:30 (IRST)

Cheshmeh Sangin (Persian: چشمه سنگين) (Note: Also romanized as Cheshmeh Sangīn) is a village in Seylatan Rural District of the Central District in Bijar County, Kurdistan Province, Iran.

== Demographics ==
=== Ethnicity ===
The village is populated by Kurds.

=== Population ===
At the time of the 2006 National Census, the village's population was 125 in 27 households. The following census in 2011 counted 136 people in 37 households. The 2016 census measured the population of the village as 117 people in 39 households.
