= Aghbolagh-e Ali Akbar Khan =

Village in Kurdistan province, Iran

Aghbolagh-e Ali Akbar Khan Persian: آغبلاغ علي اكبر خان
- Village
- Location within Iran Location within Iran Kurdistan
- Coordinates: 36°06′06″N 47°32′47″E
- Country: Iran
- Province: Kurdistan
- County: Bijar
- District: Central
- Rural District: Siyah Mansur

Population (2016)
  - Total: 137
- Time zone: UTC+3:30 (IRST)

Aghbolagh-e Ali Akbar Khan (Persian: آغبلاغ علي اكبر خان) (Note: Also romanized as Āghbolāgh-e ‘Alī Akbar Khān; also known as Āq Bolāgh-e ‘Alī Akbar Khān and Āqbolāgh-e ‘Alīakbar Khān) is a village in Siyah Mansur Rural District of the Central District in Bijar County, Kurdistan province, Iran.

== Demographics ==
=== Ethnicity ===
The village is populated by Kurds.

=== Population ===
At the time of the 2006 National Census, the village's population was 170 in 34 households. The following census in 2011 counted 135 people in 33 households. The 2016 census measured the population of the village as 137 people in 41 households.
