= Meydan-e Mozaffarkhan =

Village in Kurdistan province, Iran

Meydan-e Mozaffarkhan Persian: ميدان مظفرخان
- Village
- Location within Iran Location within Iran Kurdistan
- Coordinates: 36°14′47″N 47°20′12″E
- Country: Iran
- Province: Kurdistan
- County: Bijar
- District: Central
- Rural District: Siyah Mansur

Population (2016)
  - Total: 147
- Time zone: UTC+3:30 (IRST)

Meydan-e Mozaffarkhan (Persian: ميدان مظفرخان) (Note: Also romanized as Meydān-e Moz̧affarkhān; also known as Meydān) is a village in Siyah Mansur Rural District of the Central District in Bijar County, Kurdistan province, Iran.

== Demographics ==
=== Ethnicity ===
The village is populated by Azerbaijanis.

=== Population ===
At the time of the 2006 National Census, the village's population was 217 in 55 households. The following census in 2011 counted 209 people in 65 households. The 2016 census measured the population of the village as 147 people in 54 households.
