= Qaba Sorkh =

Village in Kurdistan province, Iran

Qaba Sorkh Persian: قباسرخ
- Village
- Location within Iran Location within Iran Kurdistan
- Coordinates: 35°51′17″N 47°23′09″E
- Country: Iran
- Province: Kurdistan
- County: Bijar
- District: Central
- Rural District: Howmeh

Population (2016)
  - Total: 130
- Time zone: UTC+3:30 (IRST)

Qaba Sorkh (Persian: قباسرخ) (Note: Also romanized as Qabā Sorkh; also known as Qaba-i-Surkh) is a village in Howmeh Rural District of the Central District in Bijar County, Kurdistan province, Iran.

== Demographics ==
=== Ethnicity ===
The population is predominantly Kurdish.

=== Population ===
At the time of the 2006 National Census, the village's population was 129 in 34 households. The following census in 2011 counted 130 people in 35 households. The 2016 census measured the population of the village as 130 people in 46 households.
