= Khandan Qoli =

Village in Kurdistan province, Iran

Khandan Qoli Persian: خاندان قلي
- Village
- Location within Iran Location within Iran Kurdistan
- Coordinates: 35°41′40″N 47°25′14″E
- Country: Iran
- Province: Kurdistan
- County: Bijar
- District: Central
- Rural District: Howmeh

Population (2016)
  - Total: 895
- Time zone: UTC+3:30 (IRST)

Khandan Qoli (Persian: خاندان قلي) (Note: Also romanized as Khāndān Qolī, Khāndānqolī, and Khānedānqolī; also known as Khan Qulī and Khāneh Qulī) is a village in Howmeh Rural District of the Central District in Bijar County, Kurdistan province, Iran.

== Demographics ==
=== Ethnicity ===
The village is populated by Kurds.

=== Population ===
At the time of the 2006 National Census, the village's population was 1,003 in 237 households. The following census in 2011 counted 980 people in 256 households. The 2016 census measured the population of the village as 895 people in 271 households, the most populous in its rural district.
