= Chehel Amiran, Bijar =

Chehel Amiran چهل اميران
- Village
- Location within Iran
- Coordinates: 35°45′06″N 47°35′48″E
- Country: Iran
- Province: Kurdistan
- County: Bijar
- Bakhsh: Central
- Rural District: Howmeh

Population (2006)
  - Total: 38
- Time zone: UTC+3:30 (IRST)
  - Summer (DST): UTC+4:30 (IRDT)

Chehel Amiran (Persian: چهل اميران, also Romanized as Chehel Amīrān; also known as Chīleh Mīrān and Chilleh Mīrān) is a village in Howmeh Rural District, in the Central District of Bijar County, Kurdistan Province, Iran. At the 2006 census, its population was 38, in 12 families. The village is populated by Kurds.
