= Najafabad, Bijar =

Village in Kurdistan province, Iran

Najafabad Persian: نجف آباد
- Village
- Location within Iran Location within Iran Kurdistan
- Coordinates: 35°47′35″N 47°14′18″E
- Country: Iran
- Province: Kurdistan
- County: Bijar
- District: Central
- Rural District: Najafabad

Population (2016)
  - Total: 419
- Time zone: UTC+3:30 (IRST)

Najafabad (Persian: نجف آباد) (Note: Also romanized as Najafābād and Najfābād) is a village in, and the capital of, Najafabad Rural District in the Central District of Bijar County, Kurdistan province, Iran.

== Demographics ==
=== Ethnicity ===
The village is populated by Kurds.

=== Population ===
At the time of the 2006 National Census, the village's population was 477 in 110 households. The following census in 2011 counted 557 people in 145 households. The 2016 census measured the population of the village as 419 people in 119 households, the most populous in its rural district.
