= Rahmatabad, Kurdistan =

Village in Kurdistan province, Iran

Rahmatabad Persian: رحمت آباد
- Village
- Location within Iran Location within Iran Kurdistan
- Coordinates: 35°48′34″N 47°40′06″E
- Country: Iran
- Province: Kurdistan
- County: Bijar
- District: Central
- Rural District: Howmeh

Population (2016)
  - Total: 120
- Time zone: UTC+3:30 (IRST)

Rahmatabad (Persian: رحمت آباد) (Note: Also romanized as Raḩmatābād) is a village in Howmeh Rural District of the Central District in Bijar County, Kurdistan province, Iran.

== Demographics ==
=== Ethnicity ===
The village is populated by Kurds.

=== Population ===
At the time of the 2006 National Census, the village's population was 140 in 29 households. The following census in 2011 counted 137 people in 31 households. The 2016 census measured the population of the village as 120 people in 36 households.
