= Zeynal, Kurdistan =

Village in Kurdistan province, Iran

Zeynal Persian: زينل
- Village
- Location within Iran Location within Iran Kurdistan
- Coordinates: 35°47′38″N 48°02′08″E
- Country: Iran
- Province: Kurdistan
- County: Bijar
- District: Chang Almas
- Rural District: Pir Taj

Population (2016)
  - Total: 866
- Time zone: UTC+3:30 (IRST)

Zeynal (Persian: زينل) (Note: Also romanized as Zeinal; also known as Zenal) is a village in Pir Taj Rural District of Chang Almas District in Bijar County, Kurdistan province, Iran.

== Demographics ==
=== Ethnicity ===
The village is populated by Azerbaijanis.

=== Population ===
At the time of the 2006 National Census, the village's population was 915 in 172 households. The following census in 2011 counted 967 people in 234 households. The 2016 census measured the population of the village as 866 people in 226 households. It was the most populous village in its rural district.
