= Aghkand-e Olya =

Village in Kurdistan province, Iran

Aghkand-e Olya Persian: آغكند عليا
- Village
- Location within Iran Location within Iran Kurdistan
- Coordinates: 35°44′51″N 47°39′45″E
- Country: Iran
- Province: Kurdistan
- County: Bijar
- District: Chang Almas
- Rural District: Babarashani

Population (2016)
  - Total: 133
- Time zone: UTC+3:30 (IRST)

Aghkand-e Olya (Persian: آغكند عليا) (Note: Also romanized as Āgh Kand-e 'Olyā and Āghkand-e 'Olyā; also known as Āghkand-e Bālā, Ahkand Bāla, and Āq Kand-e Bālā) is a village in Babarashani Rural District of Chang Almas District in Bijar County, Kurdistan province, Iran.

== Demographics ==
=== Ethnicity ===
The village is populated by Kurds.

=== Population ===
At the time of the 2006 National Census, the village's population was 178 in 34 households. The following census in 2011 counted 148 people in 36 households. The 2016 census measured the population of the village as 133 people in 45 households.
