= Shahrak-e Sofla =

Village in Kurdistan province, Iran

Shahrak-e Sofla Persian: شهرك سفلي
- Village
- Location within Iran Location within Iran Kurdistan
- Coordinates: 35°36′49″N 47°24′57″E
- Country: Iran
- Province: Kurdistan
- County: Bijar
- District: Chang Almas
- Rural District: Khosrowabad

Population (2016)
  - Total: 231
- Time zone: UTC+3:30 (IRST)

Shahrak-e Sofla (Persian: شهرك سفلي) (Note: Also romanized as Shahrak-e Soflá; also known as Shārāk-e Pā’īn, Sharīkeh Pāin, and Sharīkeh-ye Pā’īn) is a village in Khosrowabad Rural District of Chang Almas District in Bijar County, Kurdistan province, Iran.

== Demographics ==
=== Ethnicity ===
The village is populated by Kurds.

=== Population ===
At the time of the 2006 National Census, the village's population was 296 in 67 households. The following census in 2011 counted 259 people in 65 households. The 2016 census measured the population of the village as 231 people in 62 households.
