= Hasanabad-e Charuq =

Village in Kurdistan province, Iran

Hasanabad-e Charuq Persian: حسن آباد چاروق
- Village
- Location within Iran Location within Iran Kurdistan
- Coordinates: 36°11′37″N 47°31′38″E
- Country: Iran
- Province: Kurdistan
- County: Bijar
- District: Central
- Rural District: Siyah Mansur

Population (2016)
  - Total: 105
- Time zone: UTC+3:30 (IRST)

Hasanabad-e Charuq (Persian: حسن آباد چاروق) (Note: Also romanized as Ḩasanābād-e Chārūq) is a village in Siyah Mansur Rural District of the Central District in Bijar County, Kurdistan province, Iran.

== Demographics ==
=== Ethnicity ===
The village is populated by Azerbaijanis.

=== Population ===
At the time of the 2006 National Census, the village's population was 165 in 32 households. The following census in 2011 counted 104 people in 25 households. The 2016 census measured the population of the village as 105 people in 33 households.
