= Kolucheh, Kurdistan =

Kolucheh كلوچه
- Village
- Location within Iran
- Coordinates: 35°37′28″N 47°54′57″E
- Country: Iran
- Province: Kurdistan
- County: Bijar
- Bakhsh: Chang Almas
- Rural District: Babarashani

Population (2006)
  - Total: 87
- Time zone: UTC+3:30 (IRST)
  - Summer (DST): UTC+4:30 (IRDT)

Kolucheh (Persian: كلوچه, also Romanized as Kolūcheh and Kelūcheh; also known as Kolcheh and Kūlchāh) is a village in Babarashani Rural District, Chang Almas District, Bijar County, Kurdistan Province, Iran. At the 2006 census, its population was 87, in 21 families. The village is populated by Kurds.
