= Jowrvandi =

Village in Kurdistan province, Iran

Jowrvandi Persian: جوروندي
- Village
- Location within Iran Location within Iran Kurdistan
- Coordinates: 35°35′14″N 47°44′33″E
- Country: Iran
- Province: Kurdistan
- County: Bijar
- District: Chang Almas
- Rural District: Babarashani

Population (2016)
  - Total: 101
- Time zone: UTC+3:30 (IRST)

Jowrvandi (Persian: جوروندي) (Note: Also romanized as Jowrvandī; also known as Baghdād Kūchūlū, Jowrbandī, and Jūrbandi) is a village in Babarashani Rural District of Chang Almas District in Bijar County, Kurdistan province, Iran.

== Demographics ==
=== Ethnicity ===
The village is populated by Kurds.

=== Population ===
At the time of the 2006 National Census, the village's population was 131 in 28 households. The following census in 2011 counted 118 people in 36 households. The 2016 census measured the population of the village as 101 people in 32 households.
