= Garachoqa, Kurdistan =

Garachoqa گراچقا
- Village
- Location within Iran
- Coordinates: 35°45′46″N 47°46′54″E
- Country: Iran
- Province: Kurdistan
- County: Bijar
- Bakhsh: Chang Almas
- Rural District: Babarashani

Population (2006)
  - Total: 94
- Time zone: UTC+3:30 (IRST)
  - Summer (DST): UTC+4:30 (IRDT)

Garachoqa (Persian: گراچقا, also Romanized as Garāchoqā, Garā Cheqā, and Garāchqā; also known as Kara Chaqa, Qarāchoqā, and Qāra Chūgeh) is a village in Babarashani Rural District, Chang Almas District, Bijar County, Kurdistan province, Iran. At the 2006 census, its population was 94, in 24 families. The village is populated by Kurds.
