= Hasan Teymur-e Olya =

Village in Kurdistan province, Iran

Hasan Teymur-e Olya Persian: حسن تيمورعليا
- Village
- Location within Iran Location within Iran Kurdistan
- Coordinates: 35°49′23″N 47°58′03″E
- Country: Iran
- Province: Kurdistan
- County: Bijar
- District: Chang Almas
- Rural District: Pir Taj

Population (2016)
  - Total: 423
- Time zone: UTC+3:30 (IRST)

Hasan Teymur-e Olya (Persian: حسن تيمورعليا) (Note: Also romanized as Ḩasan Teymūr-e 'Olyā; also known as Hasan Taīmūr, Ḩasan Ta‘mīr, Ḩasan Tamūr, and Ḩasan Teymūr) is a village in Pir Taj Rural District of Chang Almas District in Bijar County, Kurdistan province, Iran.

== Demographics ==
=== Ethnicity ===
The village is populated by Azerbaijanis.

=== Population ===
At the time of the 2006 National Census, the village's population was 550 in 128 households. The following census in 2011 counted 429 people in 123 households. The 2016 census measured the population of the village as 423 people in 120 households.
