= Shir Kosh-e Sofla =

Village in Kurdistan province, Iran

Shir Kosh-e Sofla Persian: شيركش سفلي
- Village
- Location within Iran Location within Iran Kurdistan
- Coordinates: 35°41′23″N 47°22′46″E
- Country: Iran
- Province: Kurdistan
- County: Bijar
- District: Central
- Rural District: Najafabad

Population (2016)
  - Total: 123
- Time zone: UTC+3:30 (IRST)

Shir Kosh-e Sofla (Persian: شيركش سفلي) (Note: Also romanized as Shīr Kosh-e Soflá; also known as Sarkosh-e Pā’īn, Sarkush Pāin, and Sarkūsh-e Pā’īn) is a village in Najafabad Rural District of the Central District in Bijar County, Kurdistan province, Iran.

== Demographics ==
=== Ethnicity ===
The village is populated by Kurds.

=== Population ===
At the time of the 2006 National Census, the village's population was 173 in 31 households. The following census in 2011 counted 141 people in 33 households. The 2016 census measured the population of the village as 123 people in 35 households.
