= Chopoqlu, Kurdistan =

Village in Kurdistan province, Iran

Chopoqlu Persian: چپقلو
- Village
- Location within Iran Location within Iran Kurdistan
- Coordinates: 35°53′51″N 47°57′35″E
- Country: Iran
- Province: Kurdistan
- County: Bijar
- District: Central
- Rural District: Khvor Khvoreh

Population (2016)
  - Total: 187
- Time zone: UTC+3:30 (IRST)

Chopoqlu (Persian: چپقلو) (Note: Also romanized as Chopoqlū; also known as Chabqolū, Choboqlū, and Jabūk’alū) is a village in Khvor Khvoreh Rural District of the Central District in Bijar County, Kurdistan province, Iran.

== Demographics ==
=== Ethnicity ===
The village is populated by Azerbaijanis.

=== Population ===
At the time of the 2006 National Census, the village's population was 315 in 65 households. The following census in 2011 counted 226 people in 61 households. The 2016 census measured the population of the village as 187 people in 55 households.
