= Kaka Abbas =

Village in Kurdistan province, Iran

Kaka Abbas Persian: كاكاعباس
- Village
- Location within Iran Location within Iran Kurdistan
- Coordinates: 35°39′23″N 48°02′29″E
- Country: Iran
- Province: Kurdistan
- County: Bijar
- District: Chang Almas
- Rural District: Pir Taj

Population (2016)
  - Total: 450
- Time zone: UTC+3:30 (IRST)

Kaka Abbas (Persian: كاكاعباس) (Note: Also romanized as Kākā ‘Abbās; also known as Kak ‘Abbās) is a village in Pir Taj Rural District of Chang Almas District in Bijar County, Kurdistan province, Iran.

== Demographics ==
=== Ethnicity ===
The village is populated by Azerbaijanis.

=== Population ===
At the time of the 2006 National Census, the village's population was 559 in 110 households. The following census in 2011 counted 612 people in 152 households. The 2016 census measured the population of the village as 450 people in 120 households.
