= Cheshmeh Adineh =

Village in Kurdistan province, Iran

Cheshmeh Adineh Persian: چشمه آدينه
- Village
- Location within Iran Location within Iran Kurdistan
- Coordinates: 35°45′45″N 47°59′13″E
- Country: Iran
- Province: Kurdistan
- County: Bijar
- District: Chang Almas
- Rural District: Pir Taj

Population (2016)
  - Total: 363
- Time zone: UTC+3:30 (IRST)

Cheshmeh Adineh (Persian: چشمه آدينه) (Note: Also romanized as Cheshmeh Ādīneh) is a village in Pir Taj Rural District of Chang Almas District in Bijar County, Kurdistan province, Iran.

== Demographics ==
=== Ethnicity ===
The village is populated by Azerbaijanis.

=== Population ===
At the time of the 2006 National Census, the village's population was 424 in 84 households. The following census in 2011 counted 375 people in 105 households. The 2016 census measured the population of the village as 363 people in 97 households.
