= Kacheh Gonbad =

Kacheh Gonbad (Persian: كچه گنبد), also rendered as Gacheh Gonbad, may refer to:

- Kacheh Gonbad, Bijar
- Kacheh Gonbad, Chang Almas, Bijar County
