= Zeynal Khan, Kurdistan =

Village in Kurdistan province, Iran

Zeynal Khan Persian: زينل خان
- Village
- Location within Iran Location within Iran Kurdistan
- Coordinates: 35°43′18″N 47°18′36″E
- Country: Iran
- Province: Kurdistan
- County: Bijar
- District: Central
- Rural District: Najafabad

Population (2016)
  - Total: 143
- Time zone: UTC+3:30 (IRST)

Zeynal Khan (Persian: زينل خان) (Note: Also romanized as Zeynal Khān; also known as Zainal Khān) is a village in Najafabad Rural District of the Central District in Bijar County, Kurdistan province, Iran.

== Demographics ==
=== Ethnicity ===
The village is populated by Kurds.

=== Population ===
At the time of the 2006 National Census, the village's population was 156 in 40 households. The following census in 2011 counted 139 people in 36 households. The 2016 census measured the population of the village as 143 people in 43 households.
