= Qadimi Castle =

Castle in Kurdistan Province, Iran

Qadimi castle
- قلعه قدیمی

General information
- Type: Castle
- Location: Bijar County, Iran

Qadimi castle (Persian: قلعه قدیمی) is a historical castle located in Bijar County in Kurdistan Province, The longevity of this fortress dates back to the Qajar dynasty and Pahlavi dynasty.
