= Gol Bolagh, Kurdistan =

Village in Kurdistan province, Iran

Gol Bolagh Persian: گل بلاغ
- Village
- Location within Iran Location within Iran Kurdistan
- Coordinates: 36°09′46″N 47°24′28″E
- Country: Iran
- Province: Kurdistan
- County: Bijar
- District: Central
- Rural District: Siyah Mansur

Population (2016)
  - Total: 168
- Time zone: UTC+3:30 (IRST)

Gol Bolagh (Persian: گل بلاغ) (Note: Also romanized as Gol Bolāgh) is a village in Siyah Mansur Rural District of the Central District in Bijar County, Kurdistan province, Iran.

== Demographics ==
=== Ethnicity ===
The village is populated by Azerbaijanis.

=== Population ===
At the time of the 2006 National Census, the village's population was 177 in 39 households. The following census in 2011 counted 180 people in 51 households. The 2016 census measured the population of the village as 168 people in 57 households.
