= Gav Bazeh =

Gav Bazeh (Persian: گاوبازه) may refer to:

- Gav Bazeh, Kurdistan
- Gav Bazeh, Lorestan
