= Bargoshad =

Bargoshad (Persian: برگشاد) may refer to:

- Bargoshad, Kurdistan
- Bargoshad, West Azerbaijan

== See also ==
- Bargushad (disambiguation)
