= Baba Nazar =

Baba Nazar (Persian: بابانظر) may refer to:

- Baba Nazar, Hamadan
- Baba Nazar, Kurdistan
- Baba Nazar, West Azerbaijan
- Baba Nazar (book)
