= Alagöz =

Alagöz or Alagoz may refer to:

- Alagoz, Iran, in Kurdistan Province, Iran
- Alagöz, Ardahan, a village in the district of Ardahan, Ardahan Province, Turkey
- Alagöz, Hınıs
- Alagöz, Horasan
- Alagöz, Mardin, an Assyrian/Syriac village in Mardin Province, Turkey
- Alagöz, Sandıklı, a village in the district of Sandıklı, Afyonkarahisar Province, Turkey
- Selçuk Alagöz (1944–2025), Turkish singer-songwriter
