= Salavatabad Castle =

Castle in Kurdistan Province, Iran

Salavatabad castle
- قلعه صلوات‌آباد

General information
- Type: Castle
- Location: Bijar County, Iran

Salavatabad castle (Persian: قلعه صلوات‌آباد) is a historical castle located in Bijar County in Kurdistan Province, The longevity of this fortress dates back to the Safavid dynasty.
