= Kacheh Gonbad, Siyah Mansur =

Village in Kurdistan province, Iran

Kacheh Gonbad Persian: كچه گنبد
- Village
- Location within Iran Location within Iran Kurdistan
- Coordinates: 36°11′27″N 47°13′31″E
- Country: Iran
- Province: Kurdistan
- County: Bijar
- District: Central
- Rural District: Siyah Mansur

Population (2016)
  - Total: 362
- Time zone: UTC+3:30 (IRST)

Kacheh Gonbad (Persian: كچه گنبد) (Note: Also known as Gacheh Gonbad) is a village in Siyah Mansur Rural District of the Central District in Bijar County, Kurdistan province, Iran.

== Demographics ==
=== Ethnicity ===
The village is populated by Kurds.

=== Population ===
At the time of the 2006 National Census, the village's population was 449 in 97 households. The following census in 2011 counted 393 people in 108 households. The 2016 census measured the population of the village as 362 people in 104 households.
