= Bargushad =

Bargushad and similar spellings may refer to:

- Bargyushad, a village in the Barda Rayon of Azerbaijan
- Bərgüşad, a village and municipality in the Ujar Rayon of Azerbaijan
- Bərguşad, another name for Vorotan (river)

== See also ==
- Bargoshad (disambiguation)
