= Gav Bazeh, Kurdistan =

Village in Kurdistan province, Iran

Gav Bazeh Persian: گاوبازه
- Village
- Location within Iran Location within Iran Kurdistan
- Coordinates: 35°41′31″N 48°04′40″E
- Country: Iran
- Province: Kurdistan
- County: Bijar
- District: Chang Almas
- Rural District: Pir Taj

Population (2016)
  - Total: 315
- Time zone: UTC+3:30 (IRST)

Gav Bazeh (Persian: گاوبازه) (Note: Also romanized as Gāv Bāzeh; also known as Gobāzi) is a village in Pir Taj Rural District of Chang Almas District in Bijar County, Kurdistan province, Iran.

== Demographics ==
=== Ethnicity ===
The village is populated by Azerbaijanis.

=== Population ===
At the time of the 2006 National Census, the village's population was 390 in 71 households. The following census in 2011 counted 373 people in 107 households. The 2016 census measured the population of the village as 315 people in 94 households.
