= Kan shir Kesh Olya Castle =

Castle in Kurdistan Province, Iran

Kan shir Kesh Olya castle
- قلعه کن شیر کش علیا

General information
- Type: Castle
- Location: Bijar County, Iran

Kan shir Kesh Olya castle (Persian: قلعه کن شیر کش علیا) is a historical castle located in Bijar County in Kurdistan Province, The longevity of this fortress dates back to the 1st millennium BC.
