= Pir Taj =

City in Kurdistan province, Iran

Pir Taj Persian: پيرتاج
- City
- Location within Iran Location within Iran Kurdistan
- Coordinates: 35°46′19″N 48°07′13″E
- Country: Iran
- Province: Kurdistan
- County: Bijar
- District: Chang Almas
- Established as a city: 2012

Population (2016)
  - Total: 5,757
- Time zone: UTC+3:30 (IRST)

Pir Taj (Persian: پيرتاج) (Note: Also romanized as Pīr Tāj; also known as Pīr Tājī) is a city in Chang Almas District of Bijar County, Kurdistan province, Iran, serving as the administrative center for Pir Taj Rural District.

== Demographics ==
=== Ethnicity ===
The city is populated by Turkics.

=== Population ===
At the time of the 2006 National Census, Pir Taj's population was 6,161 in 1,532 households, when it was a village in Pir Taj Rural District. The following census in 2011 counted 6,084 people in 1,783 households. The 2016 census measured the population as 5,757 people in 1,770 households, by which time the village had been converted to a city.
