= Miraka =

Miraka may refer to:

- Miraka Szászy, prominent Māori leader
- Festim Miraka, Albanian professional footballer
- Miraka, former name of Archaia Pisa, a village in Elis, Greece

== See also ==
- Mirak (disambiguation)
