= Tup Aghaj, Kurdistan =

City in Kurdistan province, Iran

Tup Aghaj Persian: توپ آغاج
- City
- Location within Iran Location within Iran Kurdistan
- Coordinates: 36°02′57″N 47°49′30″E
- Country: Iran
- Province: Kurdistan
- County: Bijar
- District: Central
- Established as a city: 2012

Population (2016)
  - Total: 1,645
- Time zone: UTC+3:30 (IRST)

Tup Aghaj (Persian: توپ آغاج) (Note: Also romanized as Tūp Āghāj; also known as Top Aghaj) is a city in the Central District of Bijar County, Kurdistan province, Iran, serving as the administrative center for Seylatan Rural District.

== Demographics ==
=== Ethnicity ===
The city is populated by Turkics.

=== Population ===
At the time of the 2006 National Census, Tup Aghaj's population was 2,172 in 517 households, when it was a village in Seylatan Rural District. The following census in 2011 counted 2,498 people in 713 households. The 2016 census measured the population as 1,645 people in 541 households, by which time the village had been converted to a city.
