= Qomchoqay Castle =

Castle in Kurdistan Province, Iran

- قلعه قمچقای
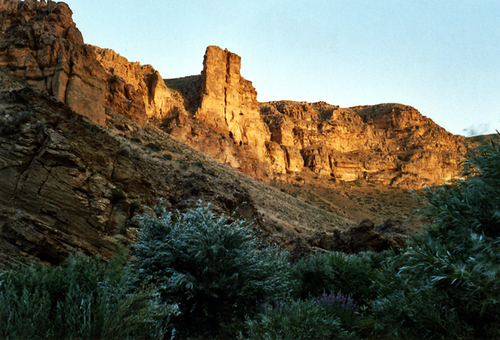

General information
- Type: Castle
- Location: Bijar County, Iran

Qomchoqay Castle (Persian: قلعه قمچقای) is a historical castle located in Bijar County in Kurdistan Province. The longevity of this fortress dates back to the 3rd millennium BC.
