= Babarashani =

City in Kurdistan province, Iran

Babarashani Persian: بابارشاني
- City
- Location within Iran Location within Iran Kurdistan
- Coordinates: 35°40′43″N 47°47′52″E
- Country: Iran
- Province: Kurdistan
- County: Bijar
- District: Chang Almas

Population (2016)
  - Total: 509
- Time zone: UTC+3:30 (IRST)

Babarashani (Persian: بابارشاني) (Note: Also romanized as Bābā Rashānī, Bābā Reshānī, and Bābārashānī; also known as Bābā Rīshānī and Baba Shani) is a city in, and the capital of, Chang Almas District of Bijar County, Kurdistan province, Iran. It also serves as the administrative center for Babarashani Rural District.

== Demographics ==
=== Ethnicity ===
The city is populated by Kurds.

=== Population ===
At the time of the 2006 National Census, the city's population was 481 in 128 households. The following census in 2011 counted 573 people in 166 households. The 2016 census measured the population of the city as 509 people in 160 households.
