= Qareh Bolagh-e Olya =

Qareh Bolagh-e Olya قره بلاغ عليا
- Village
- Location within Iran
- Coordinates: 36°51′00″N 46°29′05″E
- Country: Iran
- Province: West Azerbaijan
- County: Shahin Dezh
- Bakhsh: Keshavarz
- Rural District: Keshavarz

Population (2006)
  - Total: 200
- Time zone: UTC+3:30 (IRST)
  - Summer (DST): UTC+4:30 (IRDT)

Qareh Bolagh-e Olya (Persian: قره بلاغ عليا, also Romanized as Qareh Bolāgh-e ‘Olyā) is a village in Keshavarz Rural District, Keshavarz District, Shahin Dezh County, West Azerbaijan Province, Iran. At the 2006 census, its population was 200, in 49 families.
