= Qareh Bolagh Sheykh Morad =

Qareh Bolagh Sheykh Morad قره بلاغ شيخ مراد
- Village
- Location within Iran
- Coordinates: 34°29′09″N 45°49′51″E
- Country: Iran
- Province: Kermanshah
- County: Sarpol-e Zahab
- Bakhsh: Central
- Rural District: Howmeh-ye Sarpol

Population (2006)
  - Total: 214
- Time zone: UTC+3:30 (IRST)
  - Summer (DST): UTC+4:30 (IRDT)

Qareh Bolagh Sheykh Morad (Persian: قره بلاغ شيخ مراد, also Romanized as Qareh Bolāgh Sheykh Morād; also known as Mo‘āfī, Mū‘āfī, Qareh Bolāgh, and Qareh Bolāgh-e Māfī) is a village in Howmeh-ye Sarpol Rural District, in the Central District of Sarpol-e Zahab County, Kermanshah Province, Iran. At the 2006 census, its population was 214, in 42 families.
