= Qezel Kand, Afghanistan =

Qezel Kand
- Location in Afghanistan
- Coordinates: 36°14′14″N 66°53′41″E
- Country: Afghanistan
- Province: Balkh Province
- Time zone: + 4.30

Qezel Kand is a village in Balkh Province in northern Afghanistan.

== See also ==
- Balkh Province
