= Qarah Bolagh-e Panjeh =

Qarah Bolagh-e Panjeh قره بلاغ پنجه
- Village
- Location within Iran
- Coordinates: 35°06′57″N 47°30′12″E
- Country: Iran
- Province: Kurdistan
- County: Qorveh
- Bakhsh: Central
- Rural District: Panjeh Ali-ye Jonubi

Population (2006)
  - Total: 539
- Time zone: UTC+3:30 (IRST)
  - Summer (DST): UTC+4:30 (IRDT)

Qarah Bolagh-e Panjeh (Persian: قره بلاغ پنجه, also romanized as Qarah Bolāgh-e Panjeh and Qareh Bolāgh-e Panjeh; also known as Kareh Bolāgh, Kareh Bowlāgh, Kurreh Bulaq, Qara Bolāgh-e Panjeh, Qara Bulāq, Qarah Bowlāgh, and Qareh Bowlāgh) is a village in Panjeh Ali-ye Jonubi Rural District, in the Central District of Qorveh County, Kurdistan Province, Iran. As of the 2006 census, its population was 539, with 114 families. The village is populated by Kurds.
