= Mirag =

Mirag ميرگ
- Village
- Location within Iran
- Coordinates: 34°15′17″N 46°42′22″E
- Country: Iran
- Province: Kermanshah
- County: Kermanshah
- Bakhsh: Mahidasht
- Rural District: Mahidasht

Population (2006)
  - Total: 175
- Time zone: UTC+3:30 (IRST)
  - Summer (DST): UTC+4:30 (IRDT)

Mirag (Persian: ميرگ, also Romanized as Mīrag; also known as Mīrak) is a village in Mahidasht Rural District, Mahidasht District, Kermanshah County, Kermanshah Province, Iran. At the 2006 census, its population was 175, in 42 families.
