= Qarah Bolagh, Bostanabad =

Qarah Bolagh قره بلاغ
- Village
- Location within Iran
- Coordinates: 37°39′41″N 46°55′57″E
- Country: Iran
- Province: East Azerbaijan
- County: Bostanabad
- Bakhsh: Tekmeh Dash
- Rural District: Abbas-e Gharbi

Population (2006)
  - Total: 163
- Time zone: UTC+3:30 (IRST)
  - Summer (DST): UTC+4:30 (IRDT)

Qarah Bolagh (Persian: قره بلاغ, also Romanized as Qarah Bolāgh and Qareh Bolāgh) is a village in Abbas-e Gharbi Rural District, Tekmeh Dash District, Bostanabad County, East Azerbaijan Province, Iran. At the 2006 census, its population was 163, in 38 families.
