= Qarah Bolagh-e Khan =

Qarah Bolagh-e Khan قره بلاغ خان
- Village
- Location within Iran
- Coordinates: 35°22′57″N 47°54′35″E
- Country: Iran
- Province: Kurdistan
- County: Qorveh
- Bakhsh: Serishabad
- Rural District: Qaslan

Population (2006)
  - Total: 250
- Time zone: UTC+3:30 (IRST)
  - Summer (DST): UTC+4:30 (IRDT)

Qarah Bolagh-e Khan (Persian: قره بلاغ خان, also Romanized as Qarah Bolāgh-e Khān, Qareh Bolāgh-e Khān, and Qareh Bolāgh Khān; also known as Ghareh Bolagh Khan, Khār-i-Bāla, Qarah Bolāgh, Qareh Bolāgh, and Qareh Būlākh) is a village in Qaslan Rural District, Serishabad District, Qorveh County, Kurdistan Province, Iran. At the 2006 census, its population was 250, in 58 families. The village is populated by Azerbaijanis.
