= Negarestan, Fars =

Negarestan نگارستان
- Village
- Location within Iran
- Coordinates: 29°59′28″N 52°30′49″E
- Country: Iran
- Province: Fars
- County: Marvdasht
- Bakhsh: Dorudzan
- Rural District: Ramjerd-e Do

Population (2006)
  - Total: 308
- Time zone: UTC+3:30 (IRST)
  - Summer (DST): UTC+4:30 (IRDT)

Negarestan (Persian: نگارستان, also Romanized as Negārestān) is a village in Ramjerd-e Do Rural District, Dorudzan District, Marvdasht County, Fars province, Iran. At the 2006 census, its population was 308, in 73 families.
