= Qareh Bolagh-e Sofla =

Qareh Bolagh-e Sofla قره بلاغ سفلي
- Village
- Location within Iran
- Coordinates: 36°50′20″N 46°27′55″E
- Country: Iran
- Province: West Azerbaijan
- County: Shahin Dezh
- Bakhsh: Keshavarz
- Rural District: Keshavarz

Population (2006)
  - Total: 51
- Time zone: UTC+3:30 (IRST)
  - Summer (DST): UTC+4:30 (IRDT)

Qareh Bolagh-e Sofla (Persian: قره بلاغ سفلي, also Romanized as Qareh Bolāgh-e Soflá) is a village in Keshavarz Rural District, Keshavarz District, Shahin Dezh County, West Azerbaijan Province, Iran. At the 2006 census, its population was 51, in 13 families.
