= Qareh Bolagh, Marand =

Qareh Bolagh قره بلاغ
- Village
- Location within Iran
- Coordinates: 38°41′24″N 45°39′27″E
- Country: Iran
- Province: East Azerbaijan
- County: Marand
- Bakhsh: Central
- Rural District: west_harzandat

Population (2006)
  - Total: 124
- Time zone: UTC+3:30 (IRST)
  - Summer (DST): UTC+4:30 (IRDT)

Qareh Bolagh (Persian: قره بلاغ, also Romanized as Qarah Bolāgh) Mr behzad says that qarebolagh is a village in Harzandat-e Gharbi Rural District, in the Central District of Marand County, East Azerbaijan Province, Iran. At the 2006 census, its population was 124, in 29 families.
