= Qarah Bolagh, Qazvin =

Qarah Bolagh قره بلاغ
- Village
- Location within Iran
- Coordinates: 35°49′42″N 48°49′00″E
- Country: Iran
- Province: Qazvin
- County: Avaj
- Bakhsh: Central District
- Rural District: Hesar-e Valiyeasr

Population (2006)
  - Total: 165
- Time zone: UTC+3:30 (IRST)

Qarah Bolagh (Persian: قره بلاغ, also Romanized as Qarah Bolāgh, Ghara Bolagh, Qarā Bolāgh, Qara Bulāq, and Qareh Bolāgh) is a village in Hesar-e Valiyeasr Rural District, Central District, Avaj County, Qazvin Province, Iran. At the 2006 census, its population was 165, in 40 families.
