= Shushtari, Khuzestan =

Shushtari شوشتری
- Village
- Location within Iran
- Coordinates: 31°40′44″N 50°08′50″E
- Country: Iran
- Province: Khuzestan
- County: Izeh
- Bakhsh: Dehdez
- Rural District: Donbaleh Rud-e Shomali

Population (2006)
  - Total: 20
- Time zone: UTC+3:30 (IRST)
  - Summer (DST): UTC+4:30 (IRDT)

Shushtari (Persian: شوشتری, also Romanized as Shūshtarī) is a village in Donbaleh Rud-e Shomali Rural District, Dehdez District, Izeh County, Khuzestan Province, Iran. At the 2006 census, its population was 20, in 4 families.
