= Kolucheh, Kermanshah =

Kolucheh كلوچه، کولیچە
- Village
- Location within Iran
- Coordinates: 34°43′17″N 46°52′36″E
- Country: Iran
- Province: Kermanshah
- County: Kermanshah
- Bakhsh: Central
- Rural District: Razavar

Population (2006)
  - Total: 400
- Time zone: UTC+3:30 (IRST)
  - Summer (DST): UTC+4:30 (IRDT)

Kolucheh or Koleicha (Southern Kurdish: کولیچە, also Romanized as Kwilîçe, Persian: كلوچه, also Romanized as Kolūcheh) is a village in Razavar Rural District, in the Central District of Kermanshah County, Kermanshah Province, Iran. At the 2006 census, its population was 400, in 81 families.
