= Gareh Choqa, Hamadan =

Gareh Choqa گره چقا
- Village
- Location within Iran
- Coordinates: 34°20′22″N 48°05′57″E
- Country: Iran
- Province: Hamadan
- County: Nahavand
- Bakhsh: Khezel
- Rural District: Khezel-e Sharqi

Population (2006)
  - Total: 558
- Time zone: UTC+3:30 (IRST)
  - Summer (DST): UTC+4:30 (IRDT)

Gareh Choqa (Persian: گره چقا, also Romanized as Gareh Choqā and Gareh Cheqā; also known as Gara Chag, Garā Choqā, Gareh Chegā, Qara Chaqa, and Qareh Chāk) is a village in Khezel-e Sharqi Rural District, Khezel District, Nahavand County, Hamadan Province, Iran. At the 2006 census, its population was 558, in 144 families.
