= Quch Ghar =

Quch Ghar قوچغار
- Village
- Location within Iran
- Coordinates: 37°19′47″N 48°06′42″E
- Country: Iran
- Province: East Azerbaijan
- County: Meyaneh
- Bakhsh: Kaghazkonan
- Rural District: Kaghazkonan-e Shomali

Population (2006)
  - Total: 79
- Time zone: UTC+3:30 (IRST)
  - Summer (DST): UTC+4:30 (IRDT)

Quch Ghar (Persian: قوچغار, also Romanized as Qūch Ghār and Qūchghār; also known as Koshkar, Qareh Bolāgh, Qoshkar, and Qūchqār) is a village in Kaghazkonan-e Shomali Rural District, Kaghazkonan District, Meyaneh County, East Azerbaijan Province, Iran. At the 2006 census, its population was 79, in 32 families.
