= Zeynal Khan, Kermanshah =

Zeynal Khan زينل خان
- Village
- Location within Iran
- Coordinates: 34°01′24″N 46°10′14″E
- Country: Iran
- Province: Kermanshah
- County: Gilan-e Gharb
- Bakhsh: Central
- Rural District: Cheleh

Population (2006)
  - Total: 90
- Time zone: UTC+3:30 (IRST)
  - Summer (DST): UTC+4:30 (IRDT)

Zeynal Khan (Persian: زينل خان, also Romanized as Zeynal Khān) is a village in Cheleh Rural District, in the Central District of Gilan-e Gharb County, Kermanshah Province, Iran. At the 2006 census, its population was 90, in 21 families.
