= Qarah Bolagh, Sarab =

Qarah Bolagh قره بلاغ
- Village
- Location within Iran
- Coordinates: 38°08′07″N 47°20′52″E
- Country: Iran
- Province: East Azerbaijan
- County: Sarab
- Bakhsh: Mehraban
- Rural District: Alan Baraghush

Population (2006)
  - Total: 114
- Time zone: UTC+3:30 (IRST)
  - Summer (DST): UTC+4:30 (IRDT)

Qarah Bolagh (Persian: قره بلاغ, also Romanized as Qarah Bolāgh and Qareh Bolāgh) is a village in Alan Baraghush Rural District, Mehraban District, Sarab County, East Azerbaijan Province, Iran. At the 2006 census, its population was 114, in 26 families.
