= Qarah Bolagh, Hashtrud =

Qarah Bolagh قره بلاغ
- Village
- Location within Iran
- Coordinates: 37°35′37″N 47°06′39″E
- Country: Iran
- Province: East Azerbaijan
- County: Hashtrud
- Bakhsh: Central
- Rural District: Kuhsar

Population (2006)
  - Total: 280
- Time zone: UTC+3:30 (IRST)
  - Summer (DST): UTC+4:30 (IRDT)

Qarah Bolagh (Persian: قره بلاغ, also Romanized as Qarah Bolāgh and Qareh Bolāgh) is a village in Kuhsar Rural District, in the Central District of Hashtrud County, East Azerbaijan Province, Iran. At the 2006 census, its population was 280, in 78 families.
