= Khosrowabad Rural District =

Rural district in Kurdistan province, Iran

Khosrowabad Rural District Persian: دهستان خسروآباد
- Rural District
- Location within Iran Location within Iran Kurdistan
- Coordinates: 35°35′N 47°34′E
- Country: Iran
- Province: Kurdistan
- County: Bijar
- District: Chang Almas
- Established: 1987
- Capital: Khosrowabad

Population (2016)
  - Total: 3,134
- Time zone: UTC+3:30 (IRST)

Khosrowabad Rural District (Persian: دهستان خسروآباد) is in Chang Almas District of Bijar County, Kurdistan province, Iran. Its capital is the village of Khosrowabad.

== Demographics ==
=== Population ===
At the time of the 2006 National Census, the rural district's population was 4,319 in 985 households. There were 3,741 inhabitants in 1,032 households at the following census of 2011. The 2016 census measured the population of the rural district as 3,134 in 956 households. The most populous of its 20 villages was Cheshmeh Mantash, with 876 people.

=== Other villages in the rural district ===
- Cheshmeh Rubah
- Khvodlan
- Mohammadabad-e Nil
- Qadim Khan
- Qerkhlar
- Shahrak-e Sofla
