= Seylatan Rural District =

Rural district in Kurdistan province, Iran

Seylatan Rural District Persian: دهستان سيلتان
- Rural District
- Location within Iran Location within Iran Kurdistan
- Coordinates: 36°05′N 47°45′E
- Country: Iran
- Province: Kurdistan
- County: Bijar
- District: Central
- Established: 1987
- Capital: Tup Aghaj

Population (2016)
  - Total: 1,932
- Time zone: UTC+3:30 (IRST)

Seylatan Rural District (Persian: دهستان سيلتان) is in the Central District of Bijar County, Kurdistan province, Iran. It is administered from the city of Tup Aghaj.

== Demographics ==
=== Population ===
At the time of the 2006 National Census, the rural district's population was 4,828 in 1,150 households. There were 4,861 inhabitants in 1,362 households at the following census of 2011. The 2016 census measured the population of the rural district as 1,932 in 611 households. The most populous of its 20 villages was Bayanlu, with 478 people.

=== Other villages in the rural district ===
- Cheshmeh Sangin
- Choghur Qeshlaq
- Qarajalu
- Seyyed Hoseyn
- Shirin Bolagh
- Soltanabad-e Darreh Viran
