= Siyah Mansur Rural District =

Rural district in Kurdistan province, Iran

Siyah Mansur Rural District Persian: دهستان سياه منصور
- Rural District
- Location within Iran Location within Iran Kurdistan
- Coordinates: 36°11′N 47°19′E
- Country: Iran
- Province: Kurdistan
- County: Bijar
- District: Central
- Established: 1987
- Capital: Jafarabad

Population (2016)
  - Total: 2,759
- Time zone: UTC+3:30 (IRST)

Siyah Mansur Rural District (Persian: دهستان سياه منصور) is in the Central District of Bijar County, Kurdistan province, Iran. Its capital is the village of Jafarabad.

== Demographics ==
=== Population ===
At the time of the 2006 National Census, the rural district's population was 3,691 in 825 households. There were 3,291 inhabitants in 889 households at the following census of 2011. The 2016 census measured the population of the rural district as 2,759 in 893 households. The most populous of its 20 villages was Jafarabad, with 558 people.

=== Other villages in the rural district ===
- Aghbolagh-e Ali Akbar Khan
- Aliabad
- Gol Bolagh
- Hasanabad-e Charuq
- Kacheh Gonbad
- Khvosh Maqam
- Meydan-e Mozaffarkhan
- Qezel Bolagh
