= Pir Taj Rural District =

Rural district in Kurdistan province, Iran

Pir Taj Rural District Persian: دهستان پيرتاج
- Rural District
- Location within Iran Location within Iran Kurdistan
- Coordinates: 35°44′N 48°05′E
- Country: Iran
- Province: Kurdistan
- County: Bijar
- District: Chang Almas
- Established: 1987
- Capital: Pir Taj

Population (2016)
  - Total: 3,845
- Time zone: UTC+3:30 (IRST)

Pir Taj Rural District (Persian: دهستان پيرتاج) is in Chang Almas District of Bijar County, Kurdistan province, Iran. It is administered from the city of Pir Taj.

== Demographics ==
=== Population ===
At the time of the 2006 National Census, the rural district's population was 6,379 in 1,269 households. There were 5,937 inhabitants in 1,573 households at the following census of 2011. The 2016 census measured the population of the rural district as 3,845 in 1,083 households. The most populous of its 20 villages was Zeynal, with 866 people.

=== Other villages in the rural district ===
- Cheshmeh Adineh
- Gav Bazeh
- Hasan Teymur-e Olya
- Homayun
- Kaka Abbas
- Qazan Qarah
