= Khvor Khvoreh Rural District (Bijar County) =

Rural district in Kurdistan province, Iran

Khvor Khvoreh Rural District Persian: دهستان خورخوره
- Rural District
- Location within Iran Location within Iran Kurdistan
- Coordinates: 35°56′N 47°48′E
- Country: Iran
- Province: Kurdistan
- County: Bijar
- District: Central
- Established: 1987
- Capital: Khvor Khvoreh

Population (2016)
  - Total: 3,462
- Time zone: UTC+3:30 (IRST)

Khvor Khvoreh Rural District (Persian: دهستان خورخوره) is in the Central District of Bijar County, Kurdistan province, Iran. Its capital is the village of Khvor Khvoreh.

== Demographics ==
=== Population ===
At the time of the 2006 National Census, the rural district's population was 4,622 in 1,041 households. There were 3,922 inhabitants in 1,148 households at the following census of 2011. The 2016 census measured the population of the rural district as 3,462 in 1,099 households. The most populous of its 27 villages was Seyyedan, with 741 people.

=== Other villages in the rural district ===
- Cheshmeh Kureh
- Chopoqlu
- Chowljeh
- Mehrabad
- Qarah Palchuq
- Qeshlaq-e Khaneh
- Qezel Ali
