= Najafabad Rural District (Bijar County) =

Rural district in Kurdistan province, Iran

Najafabad Rural District Persian: دهستان نجف آباد
- Rural District
- Location within Iran Location within Iran Kurdistan
- Coordinates: 35°46′N 47°16′E
- Country: Iran
- Province: Kurdistan
- County: Bijar
- District: Central
- Established: 1987
- Capital: Najafabad

Population (2016)
  - Total: 2,724
- Time zone: UTC+3:30 (IRST)

Najafabad Rural District (Persian: دهستان نجف آباد) is in the Central District of Bijar County, Kurdistan province, Iran. Its capital is the village of Najafabad.

== Demographics ==
=== Population ===
At the time of the 2006 National Census, the rural district's population was 3,455 in 775 households. There were 3,145 inhabitants in 810 households at the following census of 2011. The 2016 census measured the population of the rural district as 2,724 in 800 households. The most populous of its 25 villages was Najafabad, with 892 people.

=== Other villages in the rural district ===
- Amirabad
- Hesar Sefid
- Kani Kan
- Now Bahar
- Shir Kosh-e Olya
- Shir Kosh-e Sofla
- Zeynal Khan
