= Babarashani Rural District =

Rural district in Kurdistan province, Iran

Babarashani Rural District Persian: دهستان بابارشاني
- Rural District
- Location within Iran Location within Iran Kurdistan
- Coordinates: 35°41′N 47°46′E
- Country: Iran
- Province: Kurdistan
- County: Bijar
- District: Chang Almas
- Established: 1987
- Capital: Babarashani

Population (2016)
  - Total: 2,050
- Time zone: UTC+3:30 (IRST)

Babarashani Rural District (Persian: دهستان بابارشاني) is in Chang Almas District of Bijar County, Kurdistan province, Iran. It is administered from the city of Babarashani.

== Demographics ==
=== Population ===
At the time of the 2006 National Census, the rural district's population was 3,178 in 739 households. There were 2,886 inhabitants in 849 households at the following census of 2011. The 2016 census measured the population of the rural district as 2,050 in 687 households. The most populous of its 34 villages was Jebreil, with 336 people.

=== Other villages in the rural district ===
- Aghkand-e Olya
- Dar Ghias
- Gowjeh Kand
- Jowrvandi
- Kahriz
- Khan Baghi
- Shebertu
