= Howmeh Rural District (Bijar County) =

Rural district in Kurdistan province, Iran

Howmeh Rural District Persian: دهستان حومه
- Rural District
- Location within Iran Location within Iran Kurdistan
- Coordinates: 35°52′N 47°31′E
- Country: Iran
- Province: Kurdistan
- County: Bijar
- District: Central
- Established: 1987
- Capital: Changiz Qaleh

Population (2016)
  - Total: 3,352
- Time zone: UTC+3:30 (IRST)

Howmeh Rural District (Persian: دهستان حومه) is in the Central District of Bijar County, Kurdistan province, Iran. Its capital is the village of Changiz Qaleh.

== Demographics ==
=== Population ===
At the time of the 2006 National Census, the rural district's population was 4,081 in 981 households. There were 3,817 inhabitants in 1,028 households at the following census of 2011. The 2016 census measured the population of the rural district as 3,352 in 1,062 households. The most populous of its 46 villages was Khandan Qoli, with 895 people.

=== Other villages in the rural district ===
- Hoseynabad-e Kamarzard
- Khorramabad
- Qaba Sorkh
- Qara Tavareh
- Qeshlaq-e Nowruz
- Rahmatabad
- Salavatabad
- Zardeh Kamar
