= Chang Almas District =

District in Kurdistan province, Iran

Chang Almas District Persian: بخش چنگ الماس
- District
- Location within Iran Location within Iran Kurdistan
- Coordinates: 35°40′N 47°50′E
- Country: Iran
- Province: Kurdistan
- County: Bijar
- Capital: Babarashani

Population (2016)
  - Total: 10,737
- Time zone: UTC+3:30 (IRST)

Chang Almas District (Persian: بخش چنگ الماس) is in Bijar County, Kurdistan province, Iran. Its capital is the city of Babarashani.

== History ==
The village of Pir Taj was converted to a city in 2012.

== Demographics ==
=== Population ===
At the time of the 2006 National Census, the district's population was 14,357 in 3,121 households. The following census in 2011 counted 13,137 people in 3,620 households. The 2016 census measured the population of the district as 10,737 inhabitants in 3,248 households.

=== Administrative divisions ===
Chang Almas District Population
Administrative Divisions	2006	2011	2016
Babarashani RD	3,178	2,886	2,050
Khosrowabad RD	4,319	3,741	3,134
Pir Taj RD	6,379	5,937	3,845
Babarashani (city)	481	573	509
Pir Taj (city)			1,199
Total	14,357	13,137	10,737
RD = Rural District
