= Central District (Bijar County) =

District in Kurdistan province, Iran

Central District (Bijar County) Persian: بخش مرکزی شهرستان بیجار
- District
- Location within Iran Location within Iran Kurdistan
- Coordinates: 35°59′N 47°33′E
- Country: Iran
- Province: Kurdistan
- County: Bijar
- Capital: Bijar

Population (2016)
  - Total: 65,888
- Time zone: UTC+3:30 (IRST)

The Central District of Bijar County (Persian: بخش مرکزی شهرستان بیجار) is in Kurdistan province, Iran. Its capital is the city of Bijar.

== History ==
The village of Tup Aghaj was converted to a city in 2012.

== Demographics ==
=== Population ===
At the time of the 2006 National Census, the district's population was 66,833 in 17,084 households. The following census in 2011 counted 66,962 people in 18,975 households. The 2016 census measured the population of the district as 65,888 inhabitants in 20,711 households.

=== Administrative divisions ===
Central District (Bijar County) Population
Administrative Divisions	2006	2011	2016
Howmeh RD	4,081	3,817	3,352
Khvor Khvoreh RD	4,622	3,922	3,462
Najafabad RD	3,455	3,145	2,724
Seylatan RD	4,828	4,861	1,932
Siyah Mansur RD	3,691	3,291	2,759
Bijar (city)	46,156	47,926	50,014
Tup Aghaj (city)			1,645
Total	66,833	66,962	65,888
RD = Rural District
