= Bijar County =

County in Kurdistan province, Iran

Bijar County Persian: شهرستان بیجار
- County
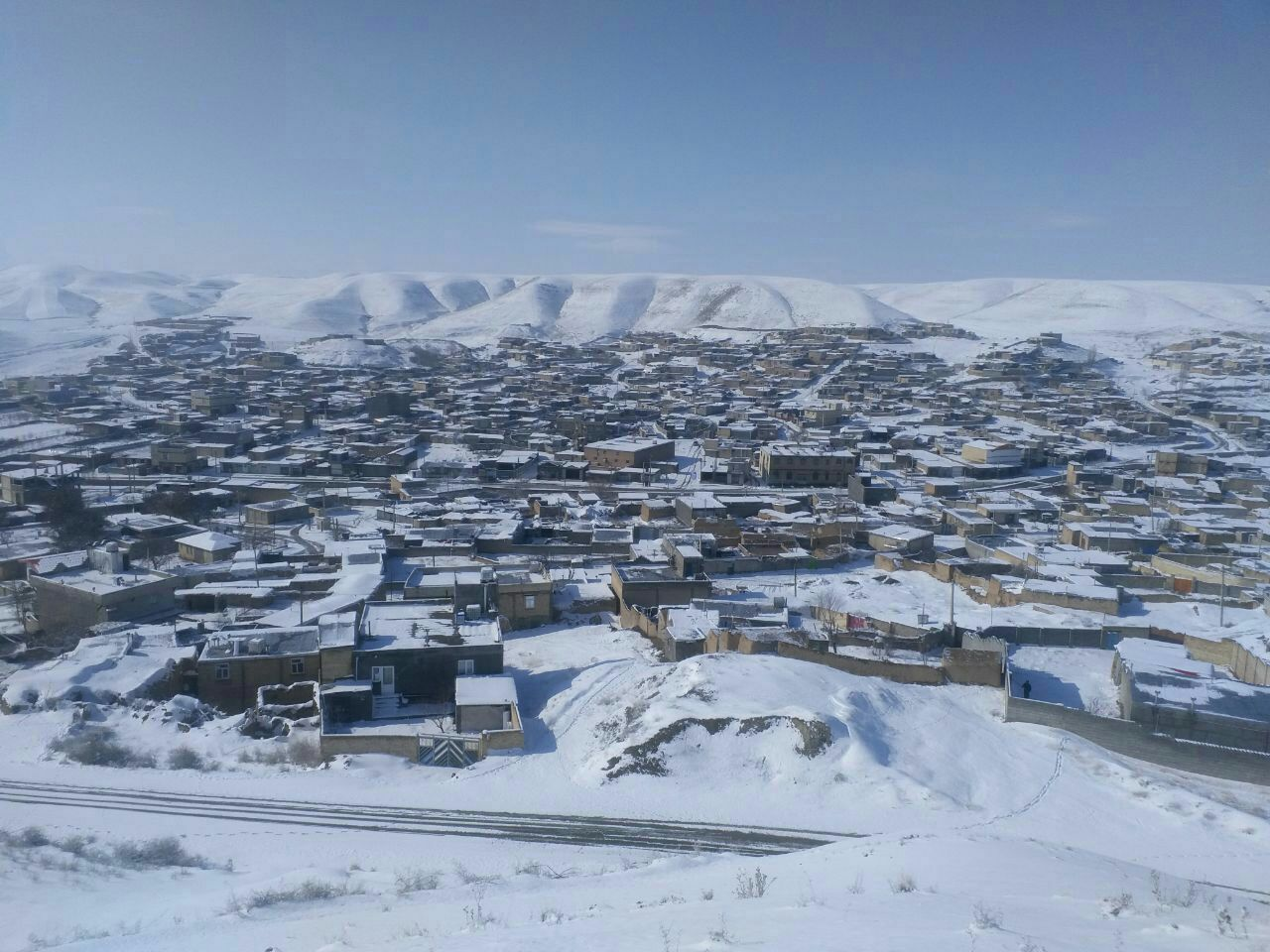
- The city of Tup Aghaj

- Location of Bijar County in Kurdistan province

- Location of Kurdistan province in Iran
- Coordinates: 36°00′N 47°40′E
- Country: Iran
- Province: Kurdistan
- Capital: Bijar
- Districts: Central, Chang Almas, Korani

Population (2016)
  - Total: 89,162
- Time zone: UTC+3:30 (IRST)

Bijar County (Persian: شهرستان بیجار) (Note: Kurdish: شارستانی بیجاڕ) is in Kurdistan province, Iran. Its capital is the city of Bijar.

== History ==
The villages of Pir Taj and Tup Aghaj were converted to cities in 2012.

== Demographics ==
=== Language and ethnicity ===
The people of the county are Kurds and speak Kurdish.

=== Population ===
At the time of the 2006 National Census, the county's population was 95,461 in 23,614 households. The following census in 2011 counted 93,714 people in 26,068 households. The 2016 census measured the population of the county as 89,162 in 27,759 households.

=== Administrative divisions ===
Bijar County's population history and administrative structure over three consecutive censuses are shown in the following table.

Bijar County Population
Administrative Divisions	2006	2011	2016
Central District	66,833	66,962	65,888
Howmeh RD	4,081	3,817	3,352
Khvor Khvoreh RD	4,622	3,922	3,462
Najafabad RD	3,455	3,145	2,724
Seylatan RD	4,828	4,861	1,932
Siyah Mansur RD	3,691	3,291	2,759
Bijar (city)	46,156	47,926	50,014
Tup Aghaj (city)			1,645
Chang Almas District	14,357	13,137	10,737
Babarashani RD	3,178	2,886	2,050
Khosrowabad RD	4,319	3,741	3,134
Pir Taj RD	6,379	5,937	3,845
Babarashani (city)	481	573	509
Pir Taj (city)			1,199
Korani District	14,271	13,615	12,537
Gorgin RD	2,447	2,065	1,997
Korani RD	4,775	4,463	3,913
Taghamin RD	3,781	3,303	3,137
Yasukand (city)	3,268	3,784	3,490
Total	95,461	93,714	89,162
RD = Rural District

== Places of interest ==
The following is a list of notable places in Bijar County:

- Qomchoqay Castle — a historical castle dating back to the 3rd millennium BC

== See also ==
Media related to Bijar County at Wikimedia Commons
