= Korani =

Korani or Korrani (Persian: كراني), also rendered as Kurani, may refer to:

- Korani, Burkina Faso, a village
- Yasukand, also called Korani, a city in Iran
- Korani District, an administrative subdivision of Iran
- Korani Rural District, an administrative subdivision of Iran
- Korani-ye Hashem Soltan, a village in Iran
- Korani-ye Olya, a village in Iran
- Korani-ye Sofla, a village in Iran
- Korrani, Fars, a village in Iran
- Kurani, Iran, a village in West Azerbaijan Province
