= Gorgin =

Gorgin (Persian: گرگين) may refer to:

- Gorgin, Baft, Kerman Province
- Gorgin, Ramsar, in mazandaran Province Citizen of Gorgin Pourahmadi, lives in Ramsar
- Gorgin, Kurdistan
- Gorgin, Qazvin
- Gorgin Rural District, in Khuzestan Province
- Gorgin (Shahnameh), an Iranian hero in Shahnameh
