= Lampak II =

Mountain in Uttarakhand, India

- Lampak North
- Location within Uttarakhand

Highest point
- Elevation: 6,181 m (20,279 ft)
- Prominence: 403 m (1,322 ft)
- Coordinates: 30°38′31″N 79°55′54″E

Geography
- Location: Uttarakhand, India
- Parent range: Garhwal Himalaya

Climbing
- First ascent: on September 21, 1970 by Mountain Lovers Association led by Prasanta Chakraborty.

Lampak II is a mountain of the Garhwal Himalaya in Uttarakhand, India.The elevation of Lampak II is 6,181 metres (20,279 ft) and its prominence is 403 metres (1,322 ft). It is 142nd joint highest located entirely within the Uttrakhand. Nanda Devi, is the highest mountain in this category. It lies 2.3 km NW of Lampak I 6,325 metres (20,751 ft) its nearest higher neighbor and it is 8 km west of Uja Tirche 6,204 metres (20,354 ft). It lies 10.7 km NW of Tirsuli 7,074 metres (23,209 ft).

== Climbing history ==
In American Alpine Club's journal published in 1970 volume 17 issue 1, the first recorded climb of Lampak South (20,750 feet) was on September 21 by Mountain Lovers Association led by Prasanta Chakraborty. The summit climbers were Milan Sen Gupta, Pranesh Chaudhury and Sherpas Pasang Tsering, Nima Dorje and Ang Chhutar. On September 6 they established their Base Camp at 15,500 feet and on the 11th Camp II. From Camp II they climbed an icefall and tried to open the route to a saddle in between Lampak South and an unnamed peak (21,340 feet). This route had to be abandoned after three attempts on it. On September 20 Camp III was established following a reconnaissance of the southwest ridge just below the towering spur. The next morning they climbed the spur, traversed the ice wall and reached summit through the southwest ridge.

An Indian expedition of seven members led by Swaraj Ghosh from West Bengal made the probable third ascent of this peak between the Siruanch and Kalla Glaciers above the road head at Malari. On August 29, 2001 they established their Base camp at 4500m and the summit was reached on September 5 through the southeast ridge. The summiteers are Swaraj Ghosh, Sibrata Banerjee, B. Biswas, Gautam Chatterjee, Amal Das, B. Jetty, and N. P. Rao.

A 10-member Punjab Police team led by PM Das climbed both Lampak I and Lampak II peaks in the Eastern Garhwal. They expedition established their base camp at 4,700m in the Kala Kharak to the west of the mountains, and then a higher camp I at 5,127m, from which both peaks could be attempted. on 4th june, camp II established at 5638m. On June 7, 2003 Lampak II was climbed by eight members including leader P M Das, Nari Dhami, Inder Kumar, Kulvinder Kumar, Mohan Lal, Anand Singh, Palvinder Singh, and Sangram Singh. They started in the morning 2 A.M. and reached the summit at 11.27 A.M.

== Neighboring and subsidiary peaks ==
neighboring or subsidiary peaks of Lampak II:

- Lampak I 6,325 metres (20,751 ft)30°37′50″N 79°57′06″E
- Gorur Parbat 6,504 metres (21,339 ft)30°36′19″N 79°58′03″E
- Uja Tirche 6,204 metres (20,354 ft)30°39′00″N 80°00′36″E
- Chalab 6,160 metres (20,210 ft)30°35′51″N 80°02′30″E
- Hardeol: 7,151 m (23,461 ft)30°33′36″N 80°00′39″E

== Glaciers and rivers ==
On the west side lies Kalla Bank Glacier which drains down to Dhauliganga River near Jumma which later joins Alaknanda River at Vishnu Prayag an 82 km journey from its mouth. Alaknanda river is one of the main tributaries of river Ganga which later joins the other tributaries Bhagirathi river at Dev Prayag and called Ganga there after.

== See also ==
- List of Himalayan peaks of Uttarakhand
