= Gorur Parbat =

Mountain in Uttarakhand, India

- Location within Uttarakhand

Highest point
- Elevation: 6,502 m (21,332 ft)
- Prominence: 577 m (1,893 ft)
- Coordinates: 30°36′9″N 79°58′03″E

Geography
- Location: Uttarakhand, India
- Parent range: Garhwal Himalaya

Gorur Parbat is a mountain of the Garhwal Himalaya in Uttarakhand, India. It is situated just outside of the northern rim of Nanda Devi Sanctuary. The elevation of Gorur Parbat is 6,502 metres (21,332 ft) and its prominence is 577 metres (1,893 ft). It is joint 88th highest located entirely within the Uttrakhand. Nanda Devi, is the highest mountain in this category. It lies 3.1 km SSE of Lampak I 6,325 metres (20,751 ft). Rishi Pahar 6,992 metres (22,940 ft) lies 8.6 km SSE and it is 6.6 km NNW of Hardeol 7,151 metres (23,461 ft). It lies 4.5 km NW of Tirsuli West 7,030 metres (23,064 ft).

== Climbing history ==
A four-member team of "JUNIPERS" an association of nature lovers from Calcutta led by Prasanta Roy, Arnab Banerjee as climbing leader, Arka Ghosh, Avijit Das and Surinder Singh Rawat as HAS. Had the first ascent on Gorur Dome (6202 m) on 9 June 1998. and reconnaissance of Gorur Parvat (6500 m) and Gorur forked peak were made. The first exploration of Gorur glacier, a tributary of the main Bagini Bamak.

== Neighboring and subsidiary peaks ==
Neighboring or subsidiary peaks of Gorur Parbat:

- Nanda Devi: 7,816 m (25,643 ft)30°55′12″N 79°35′30″E
- Lampak II 6,181 metres (20,279 ft)30°38′31″N 79°55′54″E
- Uja Tirche 6,204 metres (20,354 ft)30°39′00″N 80°00′36″E
- Chalab 6,160 metres (20,210 ft)30°35′51″N 80°02′30″E
- Hardeol: 7,151 m (23,461 ft)30°33′36″N 80°00′39″E
- Changabang: 6,864 m (22,520 ft)30°30′00″N 79°55′37″E

== Glaciers and rivers ==
Kalla Bank Glacier on the west side which drains down to Dhauli Ganga near Jumma. Siruanch Glacier on the east side which drains down to Girthi Ganga which later joins Dhauliganga near Mallari and Bagini Glacier on the SW also drains down to Dhauli Ganga which later joins Alaknanda River at Vishnu Prayag an 82 km journey from its mouth. Alaknanda river is one of the main tributaries of river Ganga which later joins the other main tributaries Bhagirathi river at Dev Prayag and called Ganga there after.

== See also ==
- List of Himalayan peaks of Uttarakhand
