= Siyuri =

Siyuri سيوري
- Village
- Location within Iran
- Coordinates: 36°15′03″N 47°34′13″E
- Country: Iran
- Province: Kurdistan
- County: Bijar
- Bakhsh: Korani
- Rural District: Taghamin

Population (2006)
  - Total: 248
- Time zone: UTC+3:30 (IRST)
  - Summer (DST): UTC+4:30 (IRDT)

Siyuri (Persian: سيوري, also Romanized as Sīyūrī) is a village in Taghamin Rural District, Korani District, Bijar County, Kurdistan Province, Iran. At the 2006 census, its population was 248, in 57 families. The village is populated by Azerbaijanis.
