= Siah Bid =

Siah Bid (Persian: سياه بيد) may refer to:

- Siah Bid-e Olya
- Siah Bid-e Sofla
