= Aghyazi =

Aghyazi آغ يازي
- Village
- Location within Iran
- Coordinates: 36°20′50″N 47°37′35″E
- Country: Iran
- Province: Kurdistan
- County: Bijar
- Bakhsh: Korani
- Rural District: Korani

Population (2006)
  - Total: 64
- Time zone: UTC+3:30 (IRST)
  - Summer (DST): UTC+4:30 (IRDT)

Aghyazi (Persian: آغ يازي, also Romanized as Āghyāzī; also known as Āqyāzī) is a village in Korani Rural District, Korani District, Bijar County, Kurdistan province, Iran. At the 2006 census, its population was 64, in 15 families. The village is populated by Azerbaijanis.
