= Owch Gonbad =

Owch Gonbad or Uchgonbad (Persian: اوچ گنبد) may refer to:

- Owch Gonbad-e Khan
- Owch Gonbad-e Soltan
