= Lampak I =

Mountain in Uttarakhand, India

- Lampak North
- Location within Uttarakhand

Highest point
- Elevation: 6,325 m (20,751 ft)
- Prominence: 651 m (2,136 ft)
- Coordinates: 30°37′50″N 79°57′06″E

Geography
- Location: Uttarakhand, India
- Parent range: Garhwal Himalaya

Climbing
- First ascent: A 10-member Punjab Police team led by PM Das climbed Lampak I on 13th june.

Lampak I is a mountain of the Garhwal Himalaya in Uttarakhand, India.The elevation of Lampak I is 6,325 metres (20,751 ft) and its prominence is 651 metres (2,136 ft). It is 114th highest located entirely within the Uttrakhand. Nanda Devi, is the highest mountain in this category. It lies 2.3 km SE of Lampak II 6,181 metres (20,279 ft). Its nearest higher neighbor Gorur Parbat 6,504 metres (21,339 ft) lies 3.1 km SSE. Uja Tirche 6,204 metres (20,354 ft) lies 6.4 km NE. It lies 7.7 km west of Shambhu ka Qila 6,289 metres (20,633 ft).

== Climbing history ==
A 10-member Punjab Police team led by PM Das climbed both Lampak I and Lampak II peaks in the Eastern Garhwal. They expedition established their base camp at 4,700m in the Kala Kharak to the west of the mountains, and then a higher camp I at 5,127m, from which both peaks could be attempted. After the initial success at Lampak II on 7 June they decided for a smaller and experienced climbers for Lampak I. On 9 June, Nari, Inder Kumar, HAP Sangram moved to Camp 1 for route-opening for Camp 2 the next day they found a site for Camp 2 at a height of 5617 m. There was space only for two small tents on the saddle. On 10 June, team leader PM Das along with Mohan Lal, Anand Singh, HAP Nand Singh occupied Camp 1. On 11 and 12 June Nari, assisted by Inder and HAP Nandan spent time opening the route for Camp 2. They fixed a nylon line of 555 m on the rock and 380 m of their climbing ropes on the ice and snow, anchoring it with snow-stakes and ice pitons. On 13 June Nari, Inder Kumar, HAP Sangram Singh, Mohan Lal and PM Das started early and all five of them were on the summit by 4.30 p.m. This was the first ascent of Lampak I.

== Neighboring and subsidiary peaks ==
Neighboring or subsidiary peaks of Lampak I:

- Lampak II 6,181 metres (20,279 ft)30°38′31″N 79°55′54″E
- Gorur Parbat 6,504 metres (21,339 ft)30°36′19″N 79°58′03″E
- Uja Tirche 6,204 metres (20,354 ft)30°39′00″N 80°00′36″E
- Chalab 6,160 metres (20,210 ft)30°35′51″N 80°02′30″E
- Hardeol: 7,151 m (23,461 ft)30°33′36″N 80°00′39″E

== Glaciers and rivers ==
On the west side lies Kalla Bank Glacier which drains down to Dhauli Ganga near Jumma which later joins Alaknanda River at Vishnu Prayag an 82 km journey from its mouth. Alaknanda river is one of the main tributaries of river Ganga which later joins the other tributaries Bhagirathi river at Dev Prayag and called Ganga there after.

== See also ==
- List of Himalayan peaks of Uttarakhand
