= Kolehzan =

Kolehzan كله زان
- Village
- Location within Iran
- Coordinates: 36°16′36″N 47°24′08″E
- Country: Iran
- Province: Kurdistan
- County: Bijar
- Bakhsh: Korani
- Rural District: Taghamin

Population (2006)
  - Total: 94
- Time zone: UTC+3:30 (IRST)
  - Summer (DST): UTC+4:30 (IRDT)

Kolehzan (Persian: كله زان, also Romanized as Kolehzān; also known as Kolūzān) is a village in Taghamin Rural District, Korani District, Bijar County, Kurdistan province, Iran. At the 2006 census, its population was 94, in 20 families. The village is populated by Azerbaijanis.
