= Nowshad =

Nowshad (Persian: نوشاد) may refer to:

- Nowshad, Khuzestan
- Nowshad, Kurdistan

== See also ==
- NowShaD, a village in Khuzestan Province, Iran
