= Bozgodar =

Bozgodar (Persian: بزگدار) may refer to:

- Bozgodar-e Olya
- Bozgodar-e Sofla
