= Azad Veys =

Azad Veys (Persian: آزاد ويس) may refer to:

- Azad Veys-e Olya
- Azad Veys-e Sofla
