= Yengi Orkh =

Yengi Orkh or Yengi Arkh or Yengi Erkh or Yangi Arakh (Persian: ينگي ارخ) may refer to:

- Yengi Arkh, Bijar, Kurdistan Province
- Yangi Arakh, Divandarreh, Kurdistan Province
- Yengi Orkh, West Azerbaijan
