= Qeytas =

Qeytas قيطاس
- Village
- Location within Iran
- Coordinates: 36°20′10″N 47°44′27″E
- Country: Iran
- Province: Kurdistan
- County: Bijar
- Bakhsh: Korani
- Rural District: Korani

Population (2006)
  - Total: 135
- Time zone: UTC+3:30 (IRST)
  - Summer (DST): UTC+4:30 (IRDT)

Qeytas (Persian: قيطاس, also Romanized as Qeyţās) is a village in Korani Rural District, Korani District, Bijar County, Kurdistan Province, Iran. At the 2006 census, its population was 135, in 27 families. The village is populated by Azerbaijanis.
