= Qurt Darreh =

Qurt Darreh قورت دره
- Village
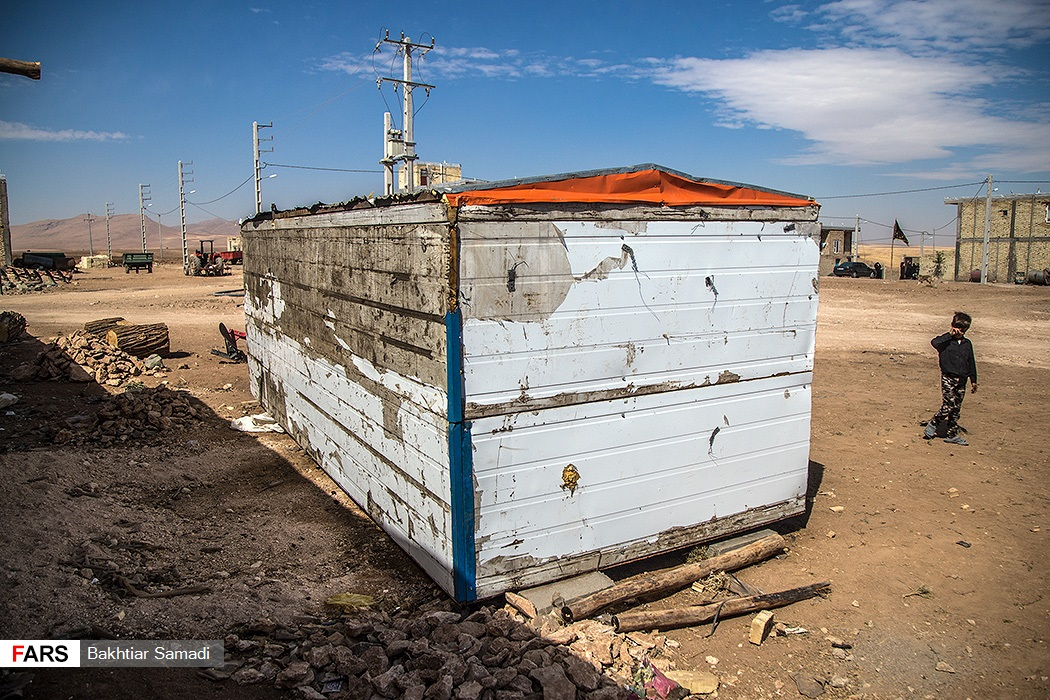
- A building in Qurt Darreh

- Location within Iran
- Coordinates: 36°16′54″N 47°35′25″E
- Country: Iran
- Province: Kurdistan
- County: Bijar
- Bakhsh: Korani
- Rural District: Taghamin

Population (2006)
  - Total: 106
- Time zone: UTC+3:30 (IRST)
  - Summer (DST): UTC+4:30 (IRDT)

Qurt Darreh (Persian: قورت دره, also Romanized as Qūrt Darreh) is a village in Taghamin Rural District, Korani District, Bijar County, Kurdistan Province, Iran. At the 2006 census, its population was 106, in 24 families. The village is populated by Azerbaijanis.
