= Agh Kand, Kurdistan =

Agh Kand آغكند
- Village
- Location within Iran
- Coordinates: 36°23′35″N 47°34′48″E
- Country: Iran
- Province: Kurdistan
- County: Bijar
- Bakhsh: Korani
- Rural District: Taghamin

Population (2006)
  - Total: 190
- Time zone: UTC+3:30 (IRST)
  - Summer (DST): UTC+4:30 (IRDT)

Agh Kand (Persian: آغكند, also Romanized as Āgh Kand; also known as Āq Kand and Āqkand-e Qareh Kand) is a village in Taghamin Rural District, Korani District, Bijar County, Kurdistan province, Iran. At the 2006 census, its population was 190, in 45 families. The village is populated by Azerbaijanis.
