= Dadash Kandi =

Village in Kurdistan province, Iran

Dadash Kandi Persian: داداش كندي
- Village
- Location within Iran Location within Iran Kurdistan
- Coordinates: 36°13′50″N 47°39′17″E
- Country: Iran
- Province: Kurdistan
- County: Bijar
- District: Korani
- Rural District: Korani

Population (2016)
  - Total: 223
- Time zone: UTC+3:30 (IRST)

Dadash Kandi (Persian: داداش كندي) (Note: Also romanized as Dādāsh Kandī) is a village in Korani Rural District of Korani District in Bijar County, Kurdistan province, Iran.

== Demographics ==
=== Ethnicity ===
The village is populated by Azerbaijanis.

=== Population ===
At the time of the 2006 National Census, the village's population was 253 in 60 households. The following census in 2011 counted 247 people in 62 households. The 2016 census measured the population of the village as 223 people in 67 households.
