= Aghcheh Gonbad =

Village in Kurdistan province, Iran

Aghcheh Gonbad Persian: آغچه گنبد
- Village
- Location within Iran Location within Iran Kurdistan
- Coordinates: 36°11′13″N 47°49′47″E
- Country: Iran
- Province: Kurdistan
- County: Bijar
- District: Korani
- Rural District: Gorgin

Population (2016)
  - Total: 167
- Time zone: UTC+3:30 (IRST)

Aghcheh Gonbad (Persian: آغچه گنبد) (Note: Also romanized as Āghcheh Gonbad; also known as Āghjeh Gonbad and Āghjeh Kand) is a village in Gorgin Rural District of Korani District in Bijar County, Kurdistan province, Iran.

== Demographics ==
=== Ethnicity ===
The village is populated by Azerbaijanis.

=== Population ===
At the time of the 2006 National Census, the village's population was 157 in 31 households. The following census in 2011 counted 172 people in 44 households. The 2016 census measured the population of the village as 167 people in 46 households.
