= Moghanlu =

Moghanlu (Persian: مغانلو) may refer to:

- Moghanlu, Ardabil
- Moghanlu, Kurdistan
- Moghanlu, Qezel Gechilu, Mahneshan County, Zanjan province
- Moghanlu, Anguran, Mahneshan County, Zanjan province
