= Alphut =

Village in Kurdistan province, Iran

Alphut Persian: الپهوت
- Village
- Location within Iran Location within Iran Kurdistan
- Coordinates: 36°10′00″N 47°39′11″E
- Country: Iran
- Province: Kurdistan
- County: Bijar
- District: Korani
- Rural District: Korani

Population (2016)
  - Total: 216
- Time zone: UTC+3:30 (IRST)

Alphut (Persian: الپهوت) (Note: Also romanized as Ālphūt and Elphūt) is a village in Korani Rural District of Korani District in Bijar County, Kurdistan province, Iran.

== Demographics ==
=== Ethnicity ===
The village is populated by Azerbaijanis.

=== Population ===
At the time of the 2006 National Census, the village's population was 221 in 45 households. The following census in 2011 counted 228 people in 61 households. The 2016 census measured the population of the village as 216 people in 63 households.
