= Sharif Kandi =

Sharif Kandi (Persian: شريف كندي) may refer to the following places in Iran:

- Sharif Kandi, Kurdistan
- Sharif Kandi, West Azerbaijan
  - Qaban Basan, Showt County, West Azerbaijan
