= Bostan Darreh =

Village in Kurdistan province, Iran

Bostan Darreh Persian: بستاندره
- Village
- Location within Iran Location within Iran Kurdistan
- Coordinates: 36°20′31″N 47°36′23″E
- Country: Iran
- Province: Kurdistan
- County: Bijar
- District: Korani
- Rural District: Taghamin

Population (2016)
  - Total: 201
- Time zone: UTC+3:30 (IRST)

Bostan Darreh (Persian: بستاندره) (Note: Also romanized as Bostān Darreh) is a village in Taghamin Rural District of Korani District in Bijar County, Kurdistan province, Iran.

== Demographics ==
=== Ethnicity ===
The village is populated by Azerbaijanis.

=== Population ===
At the time of the 2006 National Census, the village's population was 210 in 44 households. The following census in 2011 counted 194 people in 36 households. The 2016 census measured the population of the village as 201 people in 54 households.
