= Estadabad =

Estadabad استداباد
- Village
- Location within Iran
- Coordinates: 34°12′49″N 47°17′04″E
- Country: Iran
- Province: Kermanshah
- County: Kermanshah
- Bakhsh: Central
- Rural District: Dorudfaraman

Population (2006)
  - Total: 104
- Time zone: UTC+3:30 (IRST)
  - Summer (DST): UTC+4:30 (IRDT)

Estadabad (Persian: استداباد, also Romanized as Estadābād) is a village in Dorudfaraman Rural District, in the Central District of Kermanshah County, Kermanshah Province, Iran. At the 2006 census, its population was 104, in 17 families. It is named after Francis Morley Stead, an American missionary.

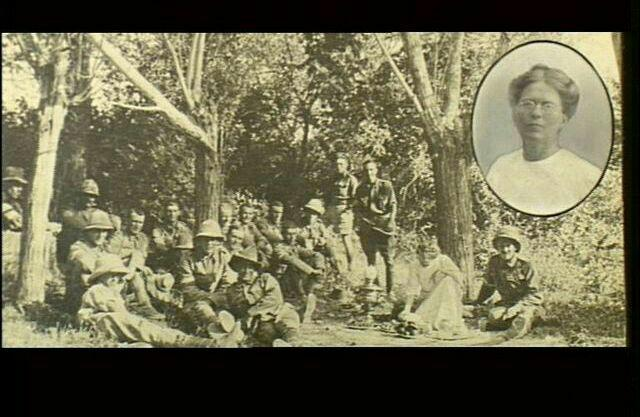
