= Mirza Kuseh =

Mirza Kuseh ميرزاكوسه
- Village
- Location within Iran
- Coordinates: 34°18′09″N 47°20′34″E
- Country: Iran
- Province: Kermanshah
- County: Kermanshah
- Bakhsh: Central
- Rural District: Dorudfaraman

Population (2006)
  - Total: 32
- Time zone: UTC+3:30 (IRST)
  - Summer (DST): UTC+4:30 (IRDT)

Mirza Kuseh (Persian: ميرزاكوسه, also Romanized as Mīrzā Kūseh) is a village in Dorudfaraman Rural District, in the Central District of Kermanshah County, Kermanshah Province, Iran. At the 2006 census, its population was 32, in 9 families.
