= Gav Panam =

Gav Panam گاوپنام
- Village
- Location within Iran
- Coordinates: 34°19′53″N 47°22′18″E
- Country: Iran
- Province: Kermanshah
- County: Kermanshah
- Bakhsh: Central
- Rural District: Dorudfaraman

Population (2006)
  - Total: 331
- Time zone: UTC+3:30 (IRST)
  - Summer (DST): UTC+4:30 (IRDT)

Gav Panam (Persian: گاوپنام, also Romanized as Gāv Panām; also known as Gāv Panāh) is a village in Dorudfaraman Rural District, in the Central District of Kermanshah County, Kermanshah Province, Iran. At the 2006 census, its population was 331, in 83 families.
