= Sheykh Besharat =

Village in Kurdistan province, Iran

Sheykh Besharat Persian: شيخ بشارت
- Village
- Location within Iran Location within Iran Kurdistan
- Coordinates: 36°15′36″N 47°42′36″E
- Country: Iran
- Province: Kurdistan
- County: Bijar
- District: Korani
- Rural District: Korani

Population (2016)
  - Total: 310
- Time zone: UTC+3:30 (IRST)

Sheykh Besharat (Persian: شيخ بشارت) (Note: Also romanized as Sheykh Beshārat) is a village in Korani Rural District of Korani District in Bijar County, Kurdistan province, Iran.

== Demographics ==
=== Ethnicity ===
The village is populated by Azerbaijanis.

=== Population ===
At the time of the 2006 National Census, the village's population was 262 in 68 households. The following census in 2011 counted 289 people in 82 households. The 2016 census measured the population of the village as 310 people in 113 households.
