= Tappeh-ye Shaban =

Tappeh-ye Shaban تپه شعبان
- Village
- Location within Iran
- Coordinates: 34°19′11″N 47°24′15″E
- Country: Iran
- Province: Kermanshah
- County: Kermanshah
- Bakhsh: Central
- Rural District: Dorudfaraman

Population (2006)
  - Total: 165
- Time zone: UTC+3:30 (IRST)
  - Summer (DST): UTC+4:30 (IRDT)

Tappeh-ye Shaban (Persian: تپه شعبان, also Romanized as Tappeh-ye Sha‘bān) is a village in Dorudfaraman Rural District, in the Central District of Kermanshah County, Kermanshah Province, Iran. At the 2006 census, its population was 165, in 39 families.
