= Moghanlu, Kurdistan =

Moghanlu مغانلو
- Village
- Location within Iran
- Coordinates: 36°10′45″N 47°54′36″E
- Country: Iran
- Province: Kurdistan
- County: Bijar
- Bakhsh: Korani
- Rural District: Gorgin

Population (2006)
  - Total: 96
- Time zone: UTC+3:30 (IRST)
  - Summer (DST): UTC+4:30 (IRDT)

Moghanlu (Persian: مغانلو, also Romanized as Moghānlū; also known as Maganlu and Maqanlu) is a village in Gorgin Rural District, Korani District, Bijar County, Kurdistan Province, Iran. At the 2006 census, its population was 96, in 23 families. The village is populated by Azerbaijanis.
