= Qareh Mohammadlu =

Village in Kurdistan province, Iran

Qareh Mohammadlu Persian: قره محمدلو
- Village
- Location within Iran Location within Iran Kurdistan
- Coordinates: 36°06′24″N 47°55′57″E
- Country: Iran
- Province: Kurdistan
- County: Bijar
- District: Korani
- Rural District: Gorgin

Population (2016)
  - Total: 151
- Time zone: UTC+3:30 (IRST)

Qareh Mohammadlu (Persian: قره محمدلو) (Note: Also romanized as Qareh Moḩammadlū; also known as Qarā Moḩammad, Qarā Moḩammadlū, Qara Muhammad, and Qareh Moḩammad) is a village in Gorgin Rural District of Korani District in Bijar County, Kurdistan province, Iran.

== Demographics ==
=== Ethnicity ===
The village is populated by Azerbaijanis.

=== Population ===
At the time of the 2006 National Census, the village's population was 117 in 25 households. The following census in 2011 counted 46 people in 11 households. The 2016 census measured the population of the village as 151 people in 43 households.
