= Yengi Arkh, Bijar =

Yengi Arkh ينگي ارخ
- Village
- Location within Iran
- Coordinates: 36°11′39″N 47°47′57″E
- Country: Iran
- Province: Kurdistan
- County: Bijar
- Bakhsh: Korani
- Rural District: Gorgin

Population (2006)
  - Total: 164
- Time zone: UTC+3:30 (IRST)
  - Summer (DST): UTC+4:30 (IRDT)

Yengi Arkh (Persian: ينگي ارخ, also Romanized as Yengī Arkh and Yangī Azakh) is a village in Gorgin Rural District, Korani District, Bijar County, Kurdistan Province, Iran. At the 2006 census, its population was 164, in 31 families. The village is populated by Azerbaijanis.
