= Gol Qeshlaq, Kurdistan =

Village in Kurdistan province, Iran

Gol Qeshlaq Persian: گل قشلاق
- Village
- Location within Iran Location within Iran Kurdistan
- Coordinates: 36°13′02″N 47°55′00″E
- Country: Iran
- Province: Kurdistan
- County: Bijar
- District: Korani
- Rural District: Gorgin

Population (2016)
  - Total: 134
- Time zone: UTC+3:30 (IRST)

Gol Qeshlaq (Persian: گل قشلاق) (Note: Also romanized as Gol Qeshlāq) is a village in Gorgin Rural District of Korani District in Bijar County, Kurdistan province, Iran.

== Demographics ==
=== Ethnicity ===
The village is populated by Azerbaijanis.

=== Population ===
At the time of the 2006 National Census, the village's population was 120 in 28 households. The following census in 2011 counted 128 people in 40 households. The 2016 census measured the population of the village as 134 people in 40 households.
