= Bijaneh =

Bijaneh بيجانه
- Village
- Location within Iran
- Coordinates: 34°19′45″N 47°08′19″E
- Country: Iran
- Province: Kermanshah
- County: Kermanshah
- Bakhsh: Central
- Rural District: Dorudfaraman

Population (2006)
  - Total: 670
- Time zone: UTC+3:30 (IRST)
  - Summer (DST): UTC+4:30 (IRDT)

Bijaneh (Persian: بيجانه, also Romanized as Bījāneh) is a village in Dorudfaraman Rural District, in the Central District of Kermanshah County, Kermanshah Province, Iran. At the 2006 census, its population was 670, in 145 families.
