= Kharabeh-ye Chul Arkh =

Village in Kurdistan province, Iran

Kharabeh-ye Chul Arkh Persian: خرابه چول ارخ
- Village
- Location within Iran Location within Iran Kurdistan
- Coordinates: 36°10′28″N 47°46′23″E
- Country: Iran
- Province: Kurdistan
- County: Bijar
- District: Korani
- Rural District: Gorgin

Population (2016)
  - Total: 159
- Time zone: UTC+3:30 (IRST)

Kharabeh-ye Chul Arkh (Persian: خرابه چول ارخ) (Note: Also romanized as Kharābeh-ye Chūl Arkh; also known as Kharābeh-ye Chehel Arkh) is a village in Gorgin Rural District of Korani District in Bijar County, Kurdistan province, Iran.

== Demographics ==
=== Ethnicity ===
The village is populated by Azerbaijanis.

=== Population ===
At the time of the 2006 National Census, the village's population was 170 in 39 households. The following census in 2011 counted 163 people in 46 households. The 2016 census measured the population of the village as 159 people in 55 households.
