= Qomchoqay, Kurdistan =

Village in Kurdistan province, Iran

Qomchoqay Persian: قمچقاي
- Village
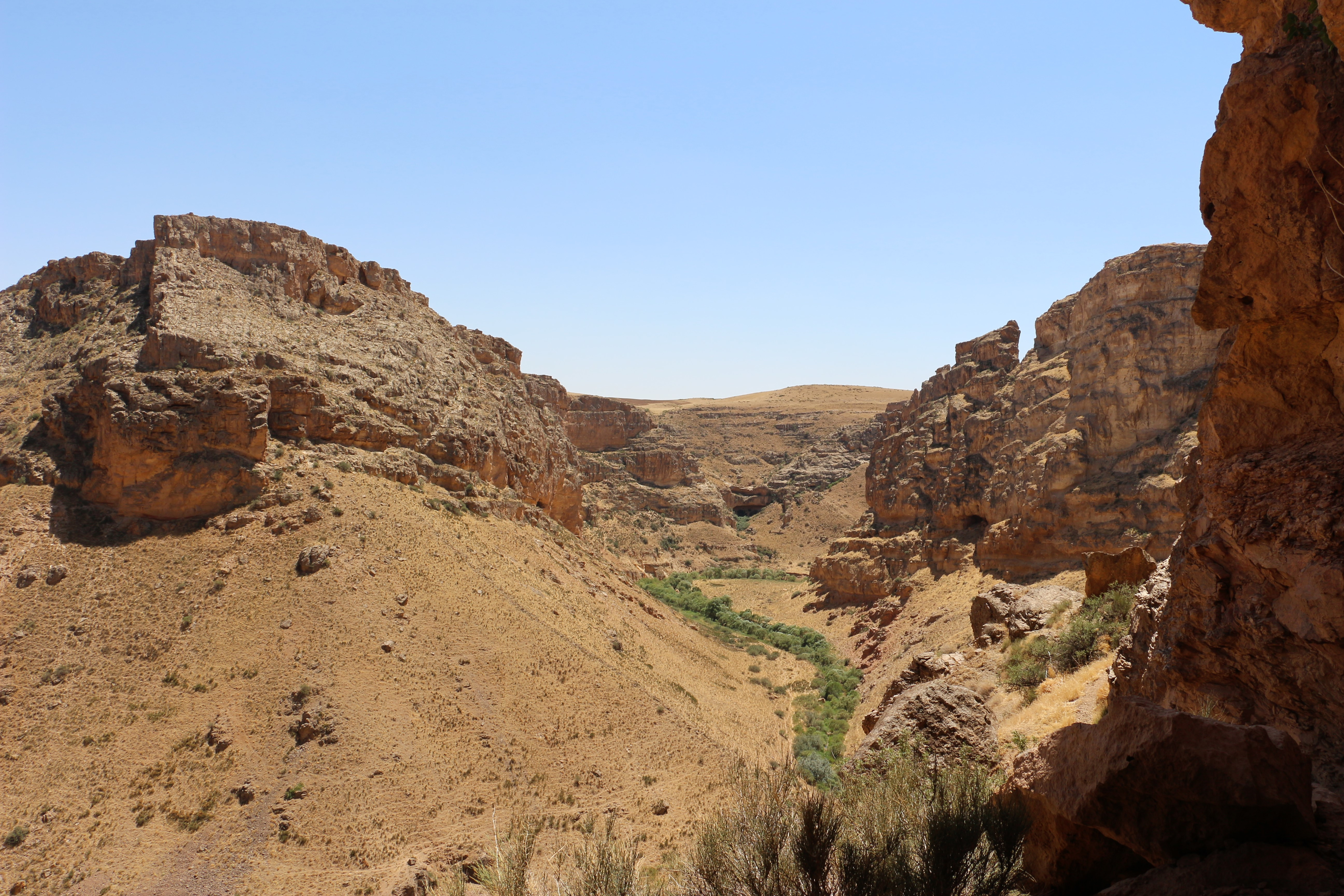
- Qomchoqay Castle in the village of Qomchoqay

- Location within Iran Location within Iran Kurdistan
- Coordinates: 36°10′00″N 47°37′32″E
- Country: Iran
- Province: Kurdistan
- County: Bijar
- District: Korani
- Rural District: Korani

Population (2016)
  - Total: 271
- Time zone: UTC+3:30 (IRST)

Qomchoqay (Persian: قمچقاي) (Note: Also romanized as Qamcheqāy and Qomchoqāy; also known as Qom Choqā) is a village in Korani Rural District of Korani District in Bijar County, Kurdistan province, Iran.

== Demographics ==
=== Ethnicity ===
The village is populated by Azerbaijanis.

=== Population ===
At the time of the 2006 National Census, the village's population was 276 in 69 households. The following census in 2011 counted 274 people in 68 households. The 2016 census measured the population of the village as 271 people in 77 households.
