= Azad Veys-e Sofla =

Azad Veys-e Sofla آزاد ويس سفلي
- Village
- Location within Iran
- Coordinates: 36°19′38″N 47°47′54″E
- Country: Iran
- Province: Kurdistan
- County: Bijar
- Bakhsh: Korani
- Rural District: Korani

Population (2006)
  - Total: 60
- Time zone: UTC+3:30 (IRST)
  - Summer (DST): UTC+4:30 (IRDT)

Azad Veys-e Sofla (Persian: آزاد ويس سفلي, also Romanized as Āzād Veys-e Soflá; also known as Āzād Veys-e Pā’īn) is a village in Korani Rural District, Korani District, Bijar County, Kurdistan province, Iran. At the 2006 census, its population was 60, in 15 families. The village is populated by Azerbaijanis.
