= Eslamabad, Bijar =

Village in Kurdistan province, Iran

Eslamabad Persian: اسلام آّباد
- Village
- Location within Iran Location within Iran Kurdistan
- Coordinates: 36°21′34″N 47°46′30″E
- Country: Iran
- Province: Kurdistan
- County: Bijar
- District: Korani
- Rural District: Korani

Population (2016)
  - Total: 657
- Time zone: UTC+3:30 (IRST)

Eslamabad (Persian: اسلام آّباد) (Note: Also romanized as Eslāmābād) is a village in Korani Rural District of Korani District in Bijar County, Kurdistan province, Iran.

== Demographics ==
=== Ethnicity ===
The village is populated by Azerbaijanis.

=== Population ===
At the time of the 2006 National Census, the village's population was 725 in 165 households. The following census in 2011 counted 743 people in 188 households. The 2016 census measured the population of the village as 657 people in 187 households, the most populous in its rural district.
