= Asim Mukhopadhyay =

Indian historian (1929–2013)

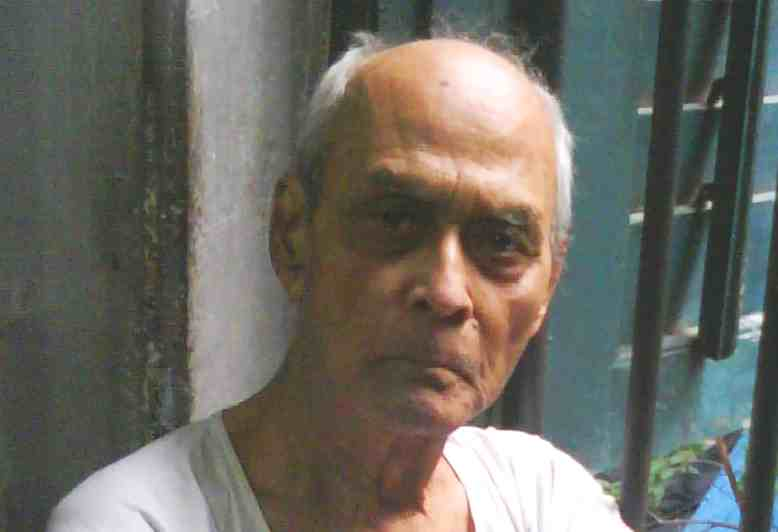
- Asim Mukhopadhyay
- Born: 10 May 1929; Calcutta, West Bengal, British India
- Died: 28 January 2013 (aged 83); Bangalore, Karnataka, India
- Occupations: Mountaineer, teacher
- Spouse: Geeta Mukherjee

Asim Mukhopadhyay (Bengali: অসীম মুখোপাধ্যায়, also known as Asim Mukherjee Bengali: অসীম মুখার্জি; 10 May 1929 – 28 January 2013) was a figure in the history of mountaineering in West Bengal, India. He was the pioneer in India for organizing high altitude scientific expeditions in the Himalayan region. He took part in many such expeditions as a climber between 1959 and 1974, and organised a few more in that period and later as an administrator. He was one of the main organisers of the first successful climbing on Nanda Ghunti and Tirsuli peaks by any non-government Indian organisation. Mukhopadhyay is also known for his vast knowledge on Pali, Buddhist literature and culture. He died on 28 January 2013, at the age of 83.

== Early life, education, and teaching career ==
Mukhopadhyay was born in Kolkata, India, the second son of Malin Kumar Mukhopadhyay, a famous advocate who appeared for Kazi Nazrul Islam in Banksal Court, Kolkata. He is the third of a family of four sisters and six brothers.

He passed Matriculation in 1946 from Collins Institute, Lenin Sarani, Kolkata. He completed his Intermediate in 1948 and Bachelor of Arts with Honours in Pali from Vidyasagar College, Kolkata. He passed Master of Arts in Pali from University of Calcutta in 1952. He got great scholars like Suniti Kumar Chatterji, Nalinaksha Dutta, Sukumar Sen and Sukumar Sengupta as teachers during the same period. Sukumar Sengupta was Head of the Department of Pali department of the University of Calcutta and research guide in the Asiatic Society.

Mukhopadhyay was a teacher during 1953–1962 in Calcutta Corporation Primary School. He joined as a teacher of Pali in Ultadanga United High School in January 1963. He continued in the same school up to his retirement in 1992.

He was President of Calcutta Corporation Teachers' Union for four years. He was also member of Board of Studies, West Bengal Council of Higher Secondary Education during 1973–1977 as a representative of Pali.

== Interest in Himalaya ==
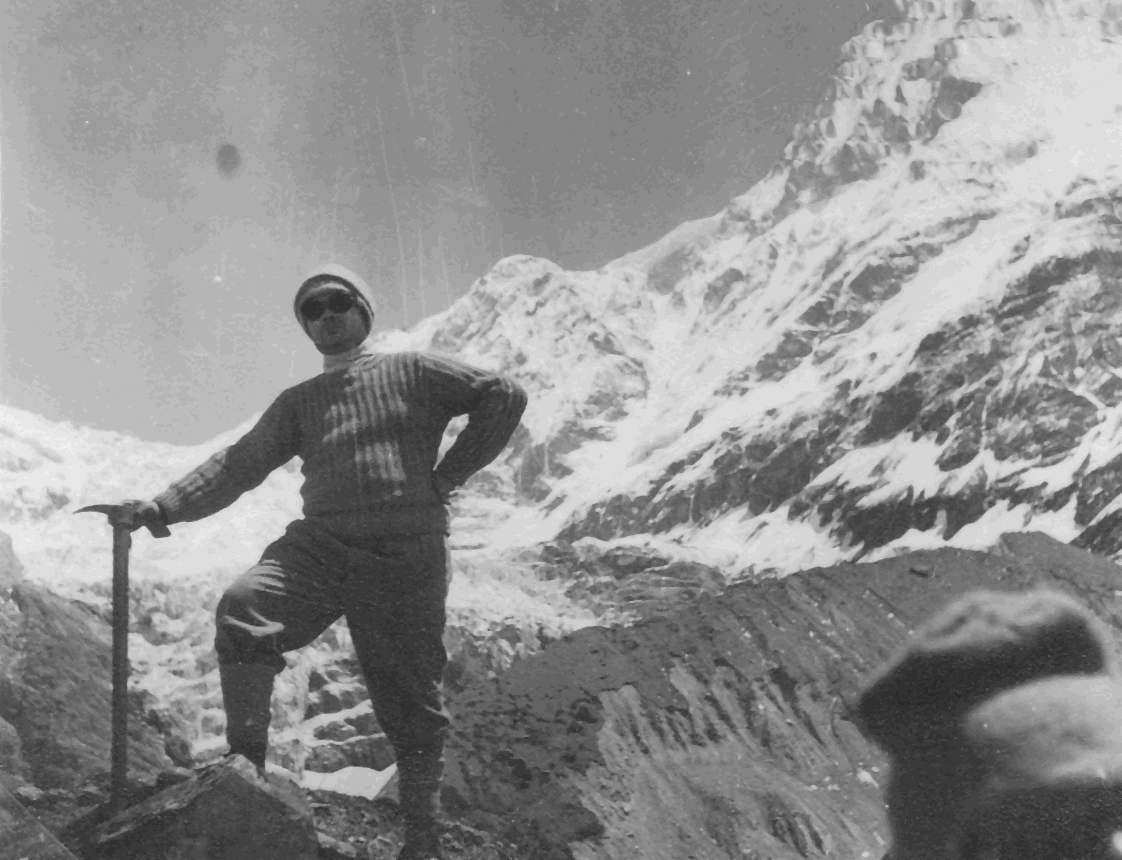
Asim Mukhopadhyay during Pindari Glacier expedition

Mukhopadhyay started feeling of exploring challenges in life after completing his M.A. in 1952. He and his friend Gouranga Banerjee, working as in charge of reading section in Anandabazar Patrika started from Kolkata in October of the same year. They reached to Uttarkashi via Haridwar, Devprayag, Rudraprayag by bus and walked to Badrinath via Joshimath. After trekking of about 11 miles to Vasudhara falls on Alakananda, they returned to Kolkata. Mukhopadhyay organised a few expeditions to Himalaya before he completed his mountaineering training in 1962 in spite of being a little heavy and aged for the training at that time. He had to make himself physically fit by losing weight and quitting smoking forever. Famous Tibetan mountaineer Nawang Gombu was the main coach and trainer.

== Kalindi Pass Expedition, 1959 ==
Mukhopadhyay took part in the expedition, the first by a non-government group in India, along with Sailesh Chakrabarty and Sukumar Ray. However, it was not recognised as an expedition by the Indian Mountaineering Foundation.

== Nanda Ghunti Expedition, 1960 ==
Mukhopadhyay was one of the main organizers of the famous Nanda Ghunti Expedition, the first successful climb to the pick ever. The budget of the expedition was about INR 45000. They approached many industrialists including Krishna Kumar Birla, Alamohan Das for monetary help. Finally Ashok Sarkar, editor of the Anandabazar Patrika agreed to sponsor the expedition. A reporter Gour Kishore Ghosh and a photographer accompanied the climbers for regular reporting to Anandabazar. The expedition was carried out under leadership of Sukumar Ray, an employee of Calcutta Corporation. Other team members were Dilip Banerjee, Nemai Bose, Dhruba Majumder, Bishwadeb, Pemba Norbu, Nima Tashi and others. Sukumar Ray and Nima Tashi climbed Nandaghunti on 22 October 1960.

== Roopkund Expedition, 1963 ==
Swami Pranavanand wrote an article named "Mysterious lake of Roopkund" on The Illustrated Weekly of India in 1962. Swami mentioned his finding of more than five hundred dead bodies at north western side of Roopkund lake. He also mentioned about local legend of king Jasdhawal and queen Ballabha sung by villagers of Wan village. The legend says that the bodies are of companions of the king. Queen gave birth of a child in the place and the whole group died due to earthquake and a snow storm created by goddess Nandadevi because of not maintaining the sanctity of the holy place.

Sukumar Ray formed a new organisation named "Hikers Club Bengal" with Anima Banerjee as president. Mukhopadhyay and the other members of the club were inspired by the article and wrote a letter to Swami mentioning their planned expedition. Pranavanand initially discouraged them as the area is really dangerous for an expedition. Yet the group planned for an expedition to resolve the mystery of the dead bodies. A team of eight led by Sukumar Ray reached the ashram of Swami at Garur belongs to present Uttarakhand. Mukhopadhyay joined the team as an archaeologist. Other members of the team were Charu Das, Kalidas Banerjee, Sushanta De Sarkar, Sushanta Gupta (photographer)and a few more. Raichand Sing was taken as guide as he accompanied Swami Pranavanand too. The final destination by bus was Gwaldam. The team started trekking from there. They faced a problem related to remuneration of the high altitude porters in a village called Pathar Nachuni on the way. The people of Wan village could not sing the legendary story of king Jasdhawl. Mukhopadhyay concluded that the legend was not true as was described by Raichand Singh, who is from the same village, to Swami. They reached to Roopkund on 2 October. However the area was covered with almost 20 feet of snow because of heavy snow fall. So the bodies could not be seen. The team took a different route to reach Gwaldam, the end point of expedition. Sushanta Gupta created a one-hour documentary film on the expedition.

A parallel expedition to the same place and at the same time was organised by Himalayan Association too.

== Tirsuli Expedition, 1966 ==
Secretary of Himalayan Association Chanchal Kumar Mitra requested Mukhopadhyay to join the team as chief patron and advisor. Mukhopadhyay did not join the expedition to organize the activities from Kolkata. He was the main interface to the printing media, mainly UNI and PTI who were publishing the reports during and after the expedition. This was the first successful summit to the peak after six failed attempts earlier. Nirapada Mullik and Shyamal Chakravarty were the submitters. Other notable members were Manik Banerjee, Marcopolo Srimal, Dr. Amitabha Sen (medical officer). The team was congratulated by many mountaineering organisations around the world after the success.

== Council of Himalayan Exploration and Research ==
During his exploration of Himalaya Mukhopadhyay felt the necessity of organizing scientific expeditions with scholars from different academic fields to conduct studies on mostly unexplored high altitude Himalayan region. He called for a convention with scholars of Botany, Zoology, Anthropology, Geology, Biochemistry etc. from different colleges and universities and a few experienced mountaineers in the month of January 1968. It was decided to form an organisation to conduct such scientific explorations. Thus the council, brain child of Mukhopadhyay was formed in 1968 with himself as the first chairman and Kalidas Banerjee as vice-chairman. Other notable members were Netai Roy (secretary), Pradip Dasgupta (secretary), Arun Mukherjee (secretary), Sailesh Chakravorty (accountant/treasurer). The registered office of the council was in 24 Creek Row, Kolkata.

Being first of its kind in India, the organisation was established to promote mountaineering based scientific explorations, publication of research papers etc. Research scholars associated with the organisation were Pradip Dasgupta (Lecturer, Department of Geology, Presidency College, Kolkata), Himanshu Banerjee (Lecturer, Department of Zoology, Presidency College, Kolkata), Bishwanath Banerjee (Professor of Anthropology, Science College, Kolkata), Rasomoy Dutta (Botanical Survey of India), Narendra Mohon Dutta (Lecturer, Department of Botany, City College, Kolkata). Later joined Tridib Bose (Geography, National Atlas Organisation), Kamal Banerjee (Lecturer, Department of Zoology, Presidency College, Kolkata), Prabal Dey (Zoological Survey of India), Dr. Gour Gopal Maiti (Lecturer, Department of Botany, Kalyani University), Mukul Hajra (Anthropological Survey of India). Many samples were collected and research papers were published from the expeditions conducted by the council.

== Kuti Valley Expedition, 1968 ==
This was the first expedition conducted by the council. Mukhopadhyay along with Prof. Pradeep Dasgupta was the main organiser of the expedition. The initial scheme was rejected by Indian Mountaineering Foundation mentioning that it was out of their scope to grant money for such a scientific exploration. IMA suggested seeking support from University Grant Commission, who also refused to provide the support. The scheme was re-planned to divide into two parts in order get financial support within the rules and regulations of IMA. Education department of West Bengal Government, Amrita Bazar Patrika and Jugantar Patrika were also co sponsors. Under the leadership of Pradip Dasgupta two peaks beside Nama Pass were under plan for climbing, although could not be climbed due to heavy snow fall in the region. A new virgin peak, unnamed on map but locally called Sangtang (6630 m), was targeted for climbing. It is the highest peak in Zanskar range. There was an unsuccessful attempt to climb Sangtang by two Swiss geologists Dr. Heim and Dr. Gansaar in 1936. Special permission was taken from the Indian military base located there as the peak was very close to the India-Tibet border. Kalidas Banerjee, Shanti Chatterjee, Charuchandra Das, Sushanta Gupta(photographer), Anil Kumar Dutta and Sushanta Kumar De Sarkar were notable among the team members. The summit party, led by Dilip Bhattacharya, sherpa Pemba Tharkay and sherpa Wanchoo conquered the peak at 2.55 p.m. on 25 September. The peak was named "Ramkrishna Paramhansa Girishringa"by the team after the famous Indian mystic Ramakrishna Paramhansa.

The research papers published out of this expedition were:

- "A collection of Aphides ([Hemiptera]) from Kuti Valley, West Himalaya" – by H. Banerjee, A.K. Ghosh, D.N. Roychoudhury, Entomology Laboratory, University of Calcutta – Oriental Insects, Vol. 3, pp. 255–264, 1969
- "The Flora of Kuti Valley" – by R. Datta, Botanical Survey of India – Himalayan Mountaineering Journal Vol. 5, pp. 42–43 1969
- "Adrenomedullary response of the Pigeon exposed to high altitude" – by P. Lahiri & H. Banerjee, Department of Zoology, University of Calcutta – Indian Journal of Physiology and Allied Science, Vol. 23, pp. 100–106
- On Textural peculiarities observed in Muth Quartzites of Kuti Valley – by P. Dasgupta, Presidency College Calcutta – Journal of the Geological Society of India, Vol. 12, pp. 152–156, pp. 413–416, 1972
- "On the zoological collection during Kuti Valley expedition 1968" – by Himanshu Banerjee
- "An outline of cultural life in Kuti – a high altitude village" – Prof. Biswanath Banerjee, lecturer, dept. of Anthropology, University of Calcutta

== Upper Spiti Exploration, 1970 ==
The pre monsoon expedition was carried out under leadership of Prof. Pradip Dasgupta. Other members were Kalidas Banerjee and Dr. Chatterjee (Anthropological Survey of India). This was the second expedition organised by the council.

== Manirang Expedition, 1974 ==
Manirang is one of the highest peaks in Himachal Pradesh. A six-week-long expedition for climbing the peak was organised by Council of Himalayan Exploration and Research under the leadership of Pradip Dasgupta. Apart from Mukhopadhyay the other members were Sailesh Chakravorty, Dilip Dutta and Prashanta Roy. The purpose of the expedition was to conduct a survey on socio religious life of the indigenous people with special reference to Buddhist culture. Different phases of the evolution of Buddhism, Buddhist art and architecture were studied. The team started from Kolkata on 2 June 1974. The team had a meeting with Dr. Y.S. Parmar, chief minister of Himachal Pradesh and got Raptan Chhering Budh, a local interpreter through him. The journey started from Tabo and continued through Poh and Dankhar. Monasteries including Tabo, Kee and Dankhar were visited and the culture and lifestyle of Buddhist were studied in detail. In Dankhar monastery they found young monks painting about Buddhist mythology on the inner walls of caves. Pradip Dasgupta met with an accident and his thigh got severely injured during the journey to the Babeh pass. After preliminary first aid, he was carried by sherpas as the journey continued. On 2 July Mukhopadhyay fell down from a height of about 200 ft and managed to escape from a sure death by falling into Spiti river as he somehow managed to hang on to a rock at the last moment. However his knee got fractured due to the impact with the stone. This was his last expedition as a climber.

== Kuti Valley Project (2nd phase) 1976 ==
The potential of Kuti valley in terms of research work on various branches of science inspired the council to conduct the second scientific expedition in the region. The team led by Dilip Kumar Dutta started from Kolkata on 3 October and reached Tawaghat in Pithoragarh district, the final point by bus, on 10th. They reached in Kuti village on 22nd. Zoological collections were not up to the mark as anticipated earlier. Zoologists Probal Dey and Kamal Banerjee collected some reptiles including a poisonous snake, butterflies, parasites etc. Botanist Dr. Gour Maiti collected about two hundred plant species. Anthropology data were collected emphasizing on marriage system, Philology and physical studies. Anthropologist Mukul Hazra found that consanguineous marriage was common in this region earlier. Dr. Tridib Kumar Bose, a geographer, recorded a complete weather chart from Pithoragarh to Kuti. Some plants used by local people for medicinal purpose were also collected. Mukhopadhyay organised the expedition and handled its administrative side.

== Exploration SPINGPA Valleys 1978 ==
SPINGPA stands for Spiti Valley, Pin, Yang valleys of Spiti district, Ropa, Baspa valleys of Kinnaur district, Manirang pass and Manirang peak (6593 m). The budget for the expedition was about INR 25000. The twelve member team consisted of research scholars from different fields of science and a few mountaineers. The team, led by Dr. Pulak Lahiri started on 21 May from Kolkata. A few of the targeted research areas are mentioned below.

- Study on presence and distribution on high altitude fish Fauna in different rivers and lakes in the region
- Parasitological study of high altitude fauna
- Study on human biology of the inhabitants of the adjoining area of Manirang pass of Spiti and Kinnaur districts, Himachal Pradesh
- Limnological studies enrooted Manirang pass and specially of the Yang lake adjacent to the pass
- Politico-Historical background, physical and cultural settings of the entire area under coverage

== Rock Climbing course in Susunia Hill, Bankura ==
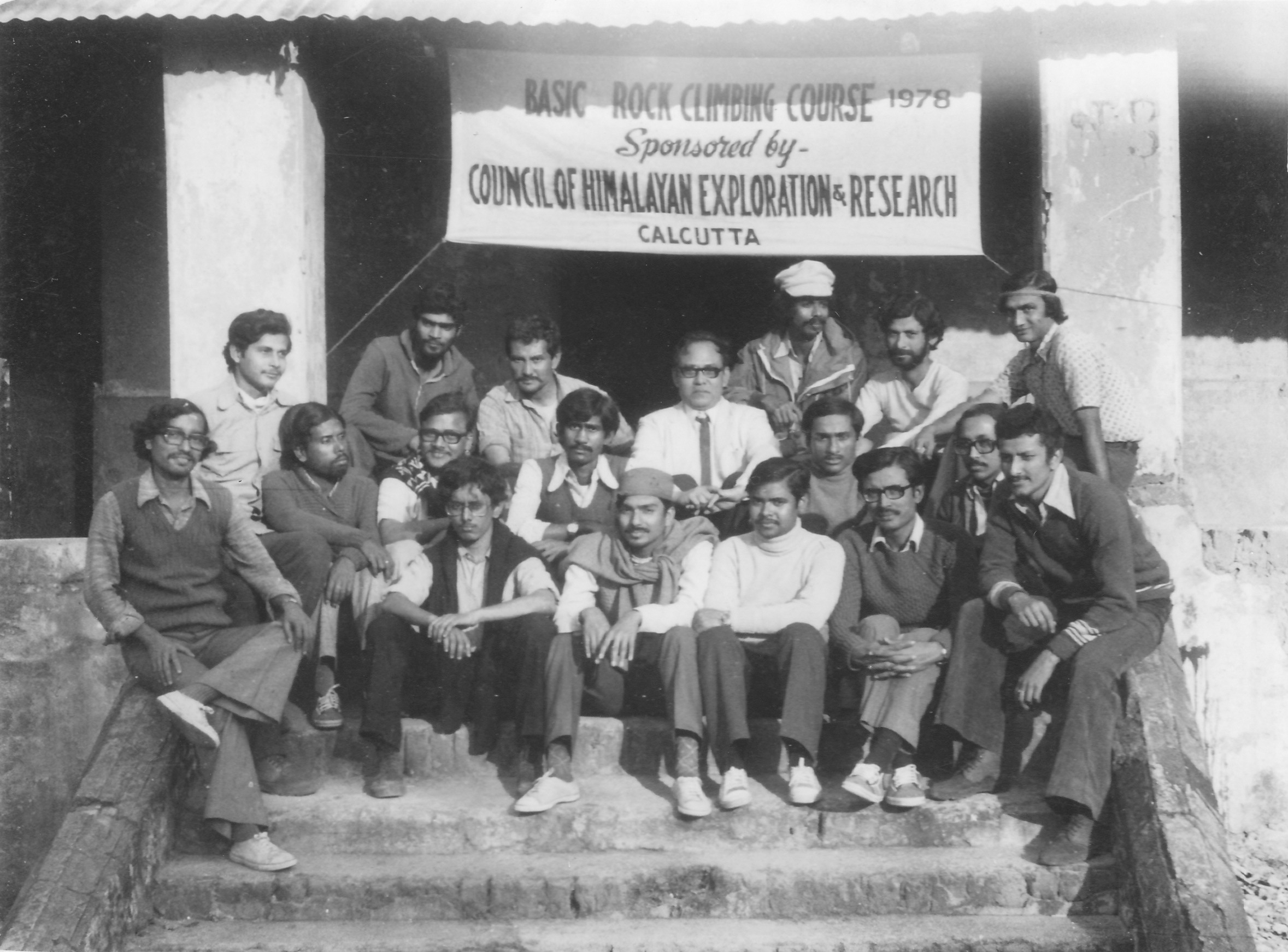
Rock climbing course sponsored by Council of Himalayan Exploration & Research

Mukhopadhyay and Sukumar Ray surveyed Ajodhya Hills, Purulia to find out possibilities of rock climbing course in 1961. It was found unsuitable for the same. They also surveyed Jaichandi Hills, Adra, Purulia and found it dangerous for such a course. Finally Susunia hills in Bankura was surveyed in 1962 and found suitable for the course. The course was formally started in 1963 on a regular basis under the banner of Himalayan Association. Later other mountaineering clubs also included such courses to Susunia and other places. Council of Himalayan Exploration and Research later organised rock climbing courses in their training programs for new aspiring mountaineers.
