= Tekiyeh, Kurdistan =

Village in Kurdistan province, Iran

Tekiyeh Persian: تكيه
- Village
- Location within Iran Location within Iran Kurdistan
- Coordinates: 36°19′24″N 47°52′32″E
- Country: Iran
- Province: Kurdistan
- County: Bijar
- District: Korani
- Rural District: Gorgin

Population (2016)
  - Total: 186
- Time zone: UTC+3:30 (IRST)

Tekiyeh (Persian: تكيه) (Note: Also romanized as Tekīyeh) is a village in Gorgin Rural District of Korani District in Bijar County, Kurdistan province, Iran.

== Demographics ==
=== Ethnicity ===
The village is populated by Azerbaijanis.

=== Population ===
At the time of the 2006 National Census, the village's population was 407 in 97 households. The following census in 2011 counted 260 people in 67 households. The 2016 census measured the population of the village as 186 people in 60 households.
