= Owch Gonbad-e Soltan =

Owch Gonbad-e Soltan اوچ گنبدسلطان
- Village
- Location within Iran
- Coordinates: 36°13′58″N 47°36′13″E
- Country: Iran
- Province: Kurdistan
- County: Bijar
- Bakhsh: Korani
- Rural District: Taghamin

Population (2006)
  - Total: 131
- Time zone: UTC+3:30 (IRST)
  - Summer (DST): UTC+4:30 (IRDT)

Owch Gonbad-e Soltan (Persian: اوچ گنبدسلطان, also Romanized as Owch Gonbad-e Solţān and Ūchgonbad-e Solţān) is a village in Taghamin Rural District, Korani District, Bijar County, Kurdistan Province, Iran. At the 2006 census, its population was 131, in 29 families. The village is populated by Azerbaijanis.
