= Gorkin (disambiguation) =

Gorkin may refer to:

- Gorkin, a village in Iran
- Alexander Gorkin, Soviet politician
- Julián Gorkin (1901–1987), Spanish revolutionary socialist
- Pamela Gorkin, American mathematician
