= Chetaq =

Village in Kurdistan province, Iran

Chetaq Persian: چتاق
- Village
- Location within Iran Location within Iran Kurdistan
- Coordinates: 36°18′12″N 47°28′30″E
- Country: Iran
- Province: Kurdistan
- County: Bijar
- District: Korani
- Rural District: Taghamin

Population (2016)
  - Total: 235
- Time zone: UTC+3:30 (IRST)

Chetaq (Persian: چتاق) (Note: Also romanized as Chatāq and Chetāq; also known as Cheţāq) is a village in Taghamin Rural District of Korani District in Bijar County, Kurdistan province, Iran.

== Demographics ==
=== Ethnicity ===
The village is populated by Azerbaijanis.

=== Population ===
At the time of the 2006 National Census, the village's population was 282 in 55 households. The following census in 2011 counted 278 people in 70 households. The 2016 census measured the population of the village as 235 people in 57 households.
