= Aghbolagh-e Taghamin =

Village in Kurdistan province, Iran

Aghbolagh-e Taghamin Persian: آغبلاغ طغامين
- Village
- Location within Iran Location within Iran Kurdistan
- Coordinates: 36°17′24″N 47°30′26″E
- Country: Iran
- Province: Kurdistan
- County: Bijar
- District: Korani
- Rural District: Taghamin

Population (2016)
  - Total: 468
- Time zone: UTC+3:30 (IRST)

Aghbolagh-e Taghamin (Persian: آغبلاغ طغامين) (Note: Also romanized as Āghbolāgh-e Ţaghāmīn; also known as Āqbolāgh-e Ţaghāmīn and Āqbolāgh-e Ţaqāmīn) is a village in, and the capital of, Taghamin Rural District in Korani District of Bijar County, Kurdistan province, Iran.

== Demographics ==
=== Ethnicity ===
The village is populated by Azerbaijanis.

=== Population ===
At the time of the 2006 National Census, the village's population was 476 in 112 households. The following census in 2011 counted 455 people in 114 households. The 2016 census measured the population of the village as 468 people in 117 households, the most populous in its rural district.
