= Kur Kureh =

Village in Kurdistan province, Iran

Kur Kureh Persian: كوركوره
- Village
- Location within Iran Location within Iran Kurdistan
- Coordinates: 36°21′23″N 47°35′48″E
- Country: Iran
- Province: Kurdistan
- County: Bijar
- District: Korani
- Rural District: Taghamin

Population (2016)
  - Total: 311
- Time zone: UTC+3:30 (IRST)

Kur Kureh (Persian: كوركوره) (Note: Also romanized as Kūr Kūreh) is a village in Taghamin Rural District of Korani District in Bijar County, Kurdistan province, Iran.

== Demographics ==
=== Ethnicity ===
The village is populated by Azerbaijanis.

=== Population ===
At the time of the 2006 National Census, the village's population was 338 in 71 households. The following census in 2011 counted 271 people in 60 households. The 2016 census measured the population of the village as 311 people in 99 households.
