= Sarab, Kurdistan =

Village in Kurdistan province, Iran

Sarab Persian: سراب
- Village
- Location within Iran Location within Iran Kurdistan
- Coordinates: 36°19′00″N 47°33′57″E
- Country: Iran
- Province: Kurdistan
- County: Bijar
- District: Korani
- Rural District: Taghamin

Population (2016)
  - Total: 347
- Time zone: UTC+3:30 (IRST)

Sarab (Persian: سراب) (Note: Also romanized as Sarāb) is a village in Taghamin Rural District of Korani District in Bijar County, Kurdistan province, Iran.

== Demographics ==
=== Ethnicity ===
The village is populated by Azerbaijanis.

=== Population ===
At the time of the 2006 National Census, the village's population was 337 in 85 households. The following census in 2011 counted 311 people in 65 households. The 2016 census measured the population of the village as 347 people in 98 households.
