= Qojur, Kurdistan =

Village in Kurdistan province, Iran

Qojur Persian: قجور
- Village
- Location within Iran Location within Iran Kurdistan
- Coordinates: 36°12′38″N 47°53′28″E
- Country: Iran
- Province: Kurdistan
- County: Bijar
- District: Korani
- Rural District: Gorgin

Population (2016)
  - Total: 207
- Time zone: UTC+3:30 (IRST)

Qojur (Persian: قجور) (Note: Also romanized as Qojūr; also known as Quchur) is a village in Gorgin Rural District of Korani District in Bijar County, Kurdistan province, Iran.

== Demographics ==
=== Ethnicity ===
The village is populated by Azerbaijanis.

=== Population ===
At the time of the 2006 National Census, the village's population was 291 in 74 households. The following census in 2011 counted 227 people in 72 households. The 2016 census measured the population of the village as 207 people in 74 households.
