= Korani-ye Sofla =

Village in Kermanshah, Iran

Korani-ye Sofla كراني سفلي
- Village
- Location within Iran
- Coordinates: 34°17′40″N 47°19′08″E
- Country: Iran
- Province: Kermanshah
- County: Kermanshah
- Bakhsh: Central
- Rural District: Dorudfaraman

Population (2006)
  - Total: 535
- Time zone: UTC+3:30 (IRST)
  - Summer (DST): UTC+4:30 (IRDT)

Korani-ye Sofla (Persian: كراني سفلي, also Romanized as Korānī-ye Soflá, Korānī-e Soflá, and Korrānī-ye Soflá; also known as Korānī-ye Pā'īn and Korrāni) is a village in Dorudfaraman Rural District, in the Central District of Kermanshah County, Kermanshah Province, Iran. At the 2006 census, its population was 535, in 129 families.
