= Deh Pahn =

Village in Kermanshah province, Iran

Deh Pahn Persian: ده پهن
- Neighbourhood
- Location within Iran
- Coordinates: 34°20′39″N 47°08′18″E
- Country: Iran
- Province: Kermanshah
- County: Kermanshah
- District: Central

Population (2016)
  - Total: 6,548
- Time zone: UTC+3:30 (IRST)

Deh Pahn (Persian: ده پهن) is a Neighbourhood in Kermanshah, Iran. It was a village in Dorudfaraman Rural District of the Central District of Kermanshah County, Kermanshah province, Iran.

== Demographics ==
=== Population ===
At the time of the 2006 National Census, the village's population was 3,463 in 859 households. The following census in 2011 counted 4,767 people in 1,311 households. The 2016 census measured the population of the village as 6,548 people in 1,887 households. It was the most populous village in its rural district.
