= Rahimabad, Dorudfaraman =

Village in Kermanshah province, Iran

Rahimabad Persian: رحيم اباد
- Village
- Location within Iran
- Coordinates: 34°20′39″N 47°19′51″E
- Country: Iran
- Province: Kermanshah
- County: Kermanshah
- District: Central
- Rural District: Dorudfaraman

Population (2016)
  - Total: 479
- Time zone: UTC+3:30 (IRST)

Rahimabad (Persian: رحيم اباد) (Note: Also romanized as Raḩīmābād) is a village in, and the capital of, Dorudfaraman Rural District of the Central District of Kermanshah County, Kermanshah province, Iran. The previous capital of the rural district was the village of Faraman.

== Demographics ==
=== Population ===
At the time of the 2006 National Census, the village's population was 583 in 137 households. The following census in 2011 counted 566 people in 170 households. The 2016 census measured the population of the village as 479 people in 144 households.
