= Gorgin, Kurdistan =

Village in Kurdistan province, Iran

Gorgin Persian: گرگين
- Village
- Location within Iran Location within Iran Kurdistan
- Coordinates: 36°13′59″N 47°52′59″E
- Country: Iran
- Province: Kurdistan
- County: Bijar
- District: Korani
- Rural District: Gorgin

Population (2016)
  - Total: 231
- Time zone: UTC+3:30 (IRST)

Gorgin (Persian: گرگين) (Note: Also romanized as Gorgīn) is a village in, and the capital of, Gorgin Rural District in Korani District of Bijar County, Kurdistan province, Iran.

== Demographics ==
=== Ethnicity ===
The village is mostly populated by Azerbaijanis.

=== Population ===
At the time of the 2006 National Census, the village's population was 272 in 72 households. The following census in 2011 counted 247 people in 74 households. The 2016 census measured the population of the village as 231 people in 81 households, the most populous in its rural district.
