= Siah Bid-e Sofla =

Siah Bid-e Sofla سياه بيدسفلي
- Village
- Location within Iran
- Coordinates: 34°20′04″N 47°10′40″E
- Country: Iran
- Province: Kermanshah
- County: Kermanshah
- Bakhsh: Central
- Rural District: Dorudfaraman

Population (2006)
  - Total: 911
- Time zone: UTC+3:30 (IRST)
  - Summer (DST): UTC+4:30 (IRDT)

Siah Bid-e Sofla (Persian: سياه بيدسفلي, also Romanized as Sīāh Bīd-e Soflá; also known as Sīāh Bīd-e Pā’īn) is a village in Dorudfaraman Rural District, in the Central District of Kermanshah County, Kermanshah Province, Iran. At the 2006 census, its population was 911, in 206 families.
