= Faraman =

Village in Kermanshah province, Iran

Faraman Persian: پەرەمان
- Village
- Location within Iran
- Coordinates: 34°12′44″N 47°17′34″E
- Country: Iran
- Province: Kermanshah
- County: Kermanshah
- District: Central
- Rural District: Dorudfaraman

Population (2016)
  - Total: 187
- Time zone: UTC+3:30 (IRST)

Faraman (Persian: فرامان) (Note: Also Romanized as Farāmān; Kurdish: پەرەمان, romanized as Feraman) is a village in, and the former capital of, Dorudfaraman Rural District of the Central District of Kermanshah County, Kermanshah province, Iran. The capital of the rural district has been transferred to Rahimabad.

== Demographics ==
=== Population ===
At the time of the 2006 National Census, the village's population was 223 in 46 households. The following census in 2011 counted 211 people in 52 households. The 2016 census measured the population of the village as 187 people in 45 households.
