= Owch Gonbad-e Khan =

Village in Kurdistan province, Iran

Owch Gonbad-e Khan Persian: اوچ گنبدخان
- Village
- Location within Iran Location within Iran Kurdistan
- Coordinates: 36°14′14″N 47°36′35″E
- Country: Iran
- Province: Kurdistan
- County: Bijar
- District: Korani
- Rural District: Taghamin

Population (2016)
  - Total: 251
- Time zone: UTC+3:30 (IRST)

Owch Gonbad-e Khan (Persian: اوچ گنبدخان) (Note: Also romanized as Owch Gonbad-e Khān and Ūchgonbad-e Khān) is a village in Taghamin Rural District of Korani District in Bijar County, Kurdistan province, Iran.

== Demographics ==
=== Ethnicity ===
The village is populated by Azerbaijanis.

=== Population ===
At the time of the 2006 National Census, the village's population was 330 in 77 households. The following census in 2011 counted 283 people in 68 households. The 2016 census measured the population of the village as 251 people in 85 households.
