= Bozgodar-e Sofla =

Bozgodar-e Sofla بزگدارسفلي
- Village
- Location within Iran
- Coordinates: 34°16′38″N 47°13′44″E
- Country: Iran
- Province: Kermanshah
- County: Kermanshah
- Bakhsh: Central
- Rural District: Dorudfaraman

Population (2006)
  - Total: 152
- Time zone: UTC+3:30 (IRST)
  - Summer (DST): UTC+4:30 (IRDT)

Bozgodar-e Sofla (Persian: بزگدارسفلي, also Romanized as Bozgodār-e Soflá; also known as Bozgodār-e Pā’īn) is a village in Dorudfaraman Rural District, in the Central District of Kermanshah County, Kermanshah Province, Iran. At the 2006 census, its population was 152, in 35 families.
