= Bozgodar-e Olya =

Bozgodar-e Olya بزگدارعليا
- Village
- Location within Iran
- Coordinates: 34°17′39″N 47°14′53″E
- Country: Iran
- Province: Kermanshah
- County: Kermanshah
- Bakhsh: Central
- Rural District: Dorudfaraman

Population (2006)
  - Total: 445
- Time zone: UTC+3:30 (IRST)
  - Summer (DST): UTC+4:30 (IRDT)

Bozgodar-e Olya (Persian: بزگدارعليا, also Romanized as Bozgodār-e ‘Olyā; also known as Bozgodār-e Bālā) is a village in Dorudfaraman Rural District, in the Central District of Kermanshah County, Kermanshah Province, Iran. In the 2006 census, its population was 445 people from 89 families.
