= Sharif Kandi, Kurdistan =

Village in Kurdistan province, Iran

Sharif Kandi Persian: شريف كندي
- Village
- Location within Iran Location within Iran Kurdistan
- Coordinates: 36°18′17″N 47°25′37″E
- Country: Iran
- Province: Kurdistan
- County: Bijar
- District: Korani
- Rural District: Taghamin

Population (2016)
  - Total: 251
- Time zone: UTC+3:30 (IRST)

Sharif Kandi (Persian: شريف كندي) (Note: Also romanized as Sharīf Kandī) is a village in Taghamin Rural District of Korani District in Bijar County, Kurdistan province, Iran.

== Demographics ==
=== Ethnicity ===
The village is populated by Azerbaijanis.

=== Population ===
At the time of the 2006 National Census, the village's population was 302 in 58 households. The following census in 2011 counted 280 people in 76 households. The 2016 census measured the population of the village as 251 people in 69 households.
