= Azad Veys-e Olya =

Village in Kurdistan province, Iran

Azad Veys-e Olya Persian: آزاد ويس عليا
- Village
- Location within Iran Location within Iran Kurdistan
- Coordinates: 36°19′48″N 47°48′31″E
- Country: Iran
- Province: Kurdistan
- County: Bijar
- District: Korani
- Rural District: Korani

Population (2016)
  - Total: 213
- Time zone: UTC+3:30 (IRST)

Azad Veys-e Olya (Persian: آزاد ويس عليا) (Note: Also romanized as Āzād Veys-e 'Olyā; also known as Āzād Veys-e Bālā) is a village in Korani Rural District of Korani District in Bijar County, Kurdistan province, Iran.

== Demographics ==
=== Ethnicity ===
The village is populated by Azerbaijanis.

=== Population ===
At the time of the 2006 National Census, the village's population was 281 in 52 households. The following census in 2011 counted 267 people in 54 households. The 2016 census measured the population of the village as 213 people in 61 households.
