= Korani-ye Olya =

Village in Kermanshah, Iran

Korani-ye Olya كراني عليا
- Village
- Location within Iran
- Coordinates: 34°17′59″N 47°18′15″E
- Country: Iran
- Province: Kermanshah
- County: Kermanshah
- Bakhsh: Central
- Rural District: Dorudfaraman

Population (2006)
  - Total: 184
- Time zone: UTC+3:30 (IRST)
  - Summer (DST): UTC+4:30 (IRDT)

Korani-ye Olya (Persian: كراني عليا, also Romanized as Korānī-ye ‘Olyā, Korānī-e ‘Olyā, and Korrānī-ye ‘Olyā; also known as Korānī-ye Bālā, Korrānī, and Kūrānī) is a village in Dorudfaraman Rural District, in the Central District of Kermanshah County, Kermanshah Province, Iran. At the 2006 census, its population was 184, in 40 families.
