= Korani-ye Hashem Soltan =

Korani-ye Hashem Soltan كراني هاشم سلطان
- Village
- Location within Iran
- Coordinates: 34°17′47″N 47°19′04″E
- Country: Iran
- Province: Kermanshah
- County: Kermanshah
- Bakhsh: Central
- Rural District: Dorudfaraman

Population (2006)
  - Total: 86
- Time zone: UTC+3:30 (IRST)
  - Summer (DST): UTC+4:30 (IRDT)

Korani-ye Hashem Soltan (Persian: كراني هاشم سلطان, also Romanized as Korānī-ye Hāshem Solţān) is a village in Dorudfaraman Rural District, in the Central District of Kermanshah County, Kermanshah Province, Iran. At the 2006 census, its population was 86, in 15 families.
