= Kurani, Baranduzchay-ye Jonubi =

Kurani كوراني
- Village
- Location within Iran
- Coordinates: 37°24′41″N 45°08′06″E
- Country: Iran
- Province: West Azerbaijan
- County: Urmia
- Bakhsh: Central
- Rural District: Baranduzchay-ye Jonubi

Population (2006)
  - Total: 118
- Time zone: UTC+3:30 (IRST)
  - Summer (DST): UTC+4:30 (IRDT)

Kurani (Persian: كوراني, also Romanized as Kūrānī; also known as Kūrāneh) is a village in Baranduzchay-ye Jonubi Rural District, in the Central District of Urmia County, West Azerbaijan Province, Iran. At the 2006 census, its population was 118, in 34 families.
