= Tirsuli =

Mountain in India

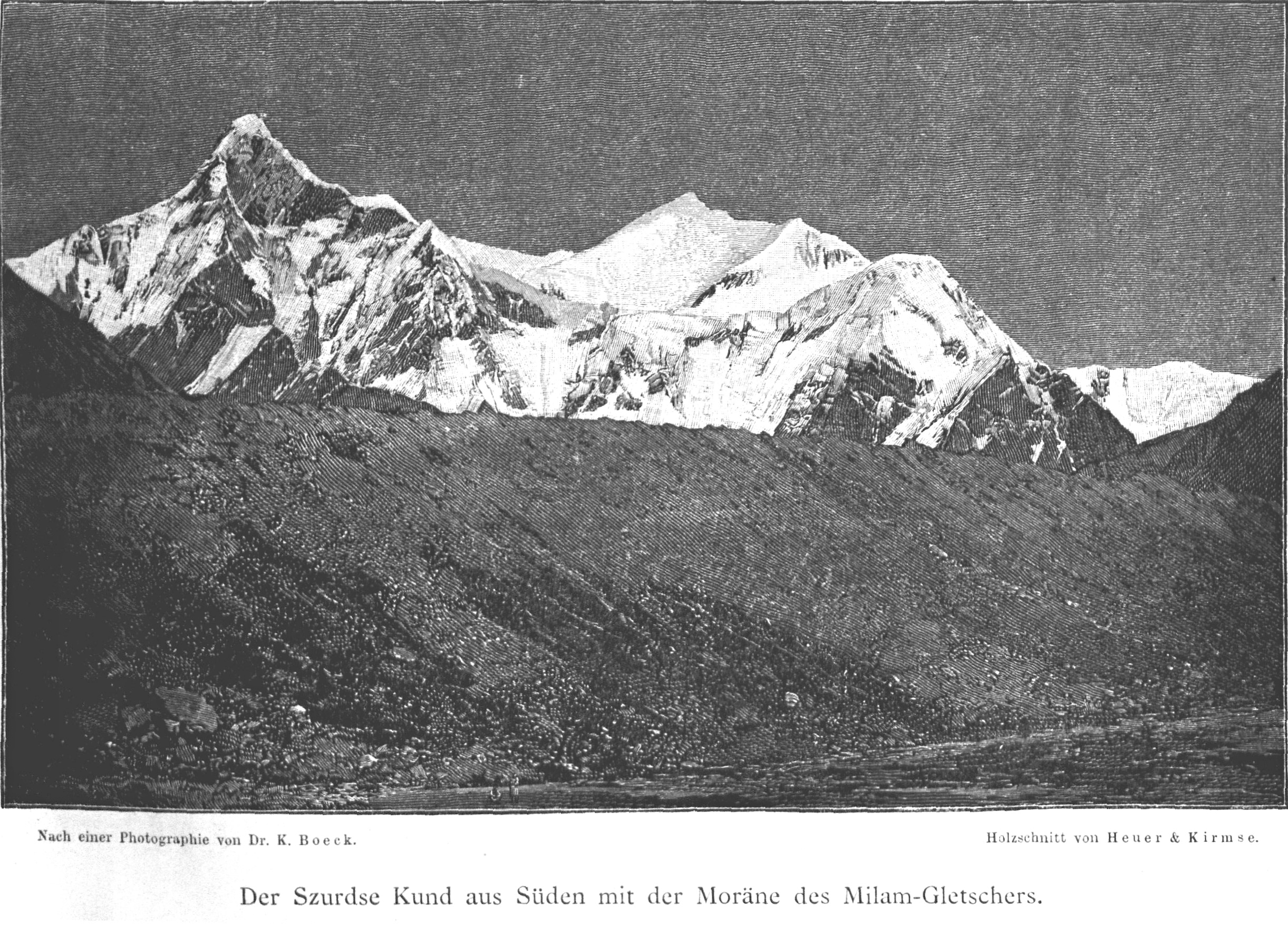
- Hardeol (left) and Tirsuli I, photo by Kurt Boeck in 1890

Highest point
- Elevation: 7,074 m (23,209 ft)
- Prominence: 624 m (2,047 ft)
- Listing: Mountains of India
- Coordinates: 30°34′48″N 80°01′12″E

Naming
- English translation: Trident

Geography
- Location within Uttarakhand Location within India
- Country: India
- State: Uttarakhand
- Districts: Pithoragarh and Chamoli
- Parent range: Garhwal Himalayas

Climbing
- First ascent: 1966, N. Mallik (Dy.leader), S. Chakravorty, Tashi (Sherpa), Dorji (Sherpa)
- Easiest route: East Face of Southeast Ridge to Southeast Ridge: snow/ice climb

Tirsuli is a Himalayan mountain peak in the Chamoli district of Uttarakhand, India. It is part of the complex of mountains, including Tirsuli West, Hardeol, Dunagiri, Changabang, and Kalanka, which make up the northeast wall of the Nanda Devi Sanctuary, in the Garhwal Himalayas. It rises at the northern end of the Johar Valley, which drains into the Ghori Ganga. This peak should not be confused with nearby Trisul, which is on the southwest side of the Sanctuary.

== Climbing history ==
In 1939, a serious attempt on this peak by the successful Polish expedition to Nanda Devi East was abandoned after a night avalanche buried leader Adam Karpinski and climber Stefan Bernadzikiewicz at Camp 3. An Indian team led by Mohan Singh Kohli from Indian Mountaineering Foundation, under Ministry of Defence, Government of India, made an unsuccessful attempt to the peak in 1964. Another team led by K. P. Sharma and organized by Himalayan Association attempted the peak in 1965, but turned back from about 18,000 ft (5,500 m).

=== First ascent ===
The peak was scaled for the first time on 9 October 1966 by another Indian team led by Chanchal Kumar Mitra and also organised by Himalayan Association of Calcutta. They ascended the east face of the south-east ridge and then took the south-east ridge to the top, mounting the summit bid from Camp 5, at about 21,860 ft (6,660 m). Nirapada Mallik (Deputy leader), Shyamal Chakrabarty, Nima Tashi (former Dy.Director of training at The HMI Darjeeling) and Dorji sherpa were the summiteers. Other members of the team were Manik Banerjee, K.K. Khanna, Marcopolo Srimal, Dr. Jungpangi from Geological Survey of India, Dr. Amitava Sen(M.O), Pinaki Sinha and Sailesh Chakraborty. The expedition was organised by the Himalayan Association, Kolkata.

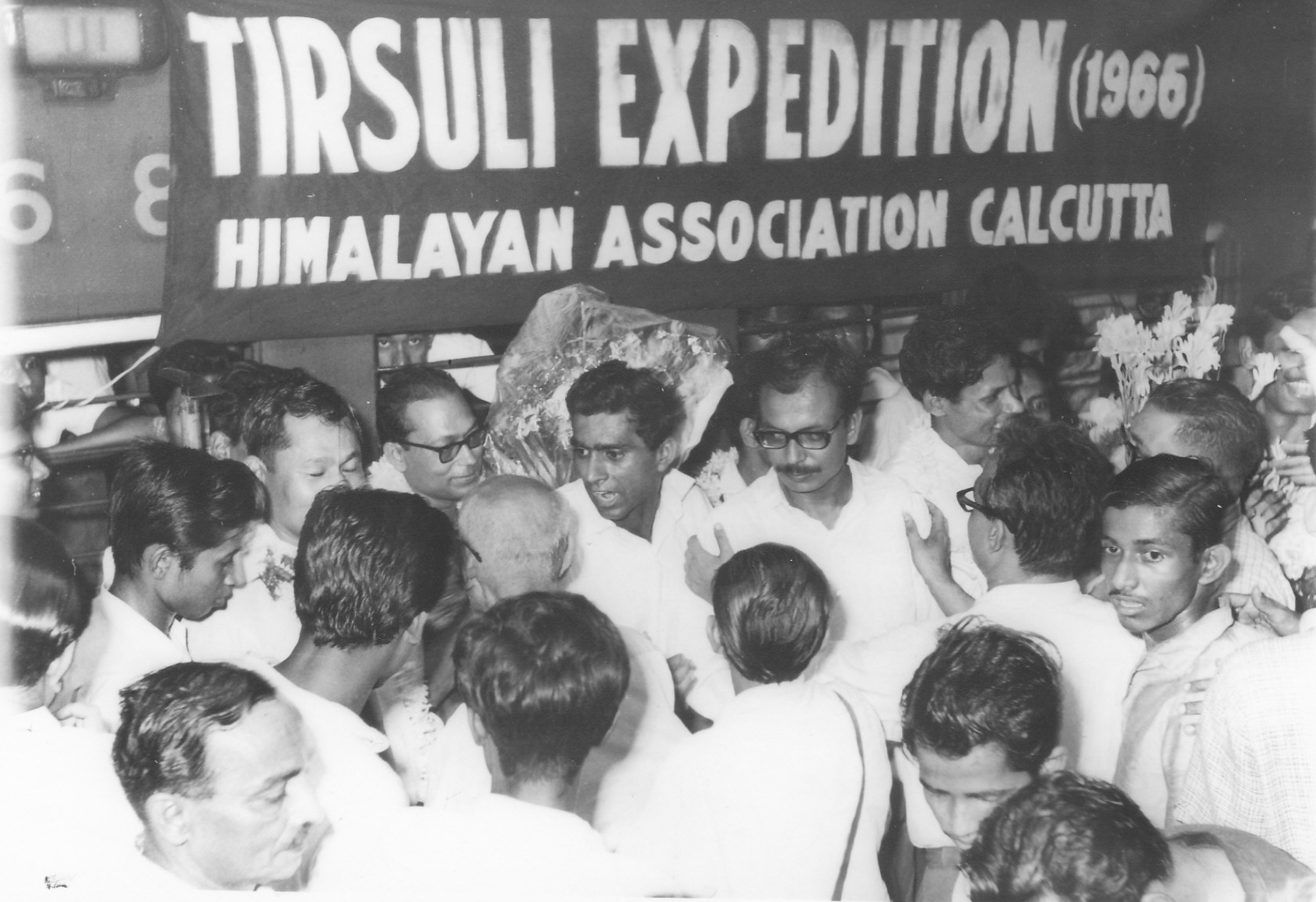
Expedition team
