= Yangi Arakh, Divandarreh =

Yangi Arakh ينگي ارخ
- Village
- Location within Iran
- Coordinates: 35°49′12″N 47°02′31″E
- Country: Iran
- Province: Kurdistan
- County: Divandarreh
- Bakhsh: Saral
- Rural District: Kowleh

Population (2006)
  - Total: 315
- Time zone: UTC+3:30 (IRST)
  - Summer (DST): UTC+4:30 (IRDT)

Yangi Arakh (Persian: ينگي ارخ, also Romanized as Yangī Arakh, Yengī Arkh, and Yengī Erkh; also known as Arīkeh, Arikeha, and Arīkeheh) is a village in Kowleh Rural District, Saral District, Divandarreh County, Kurdistan Province, Iran. At the 2006 census, its population was 315, in 64 families. The village is populated by Kurds.
