= Yasukand =

City in Kurdistan province, Iran

Yasukand Persian: یاسوکند
- City
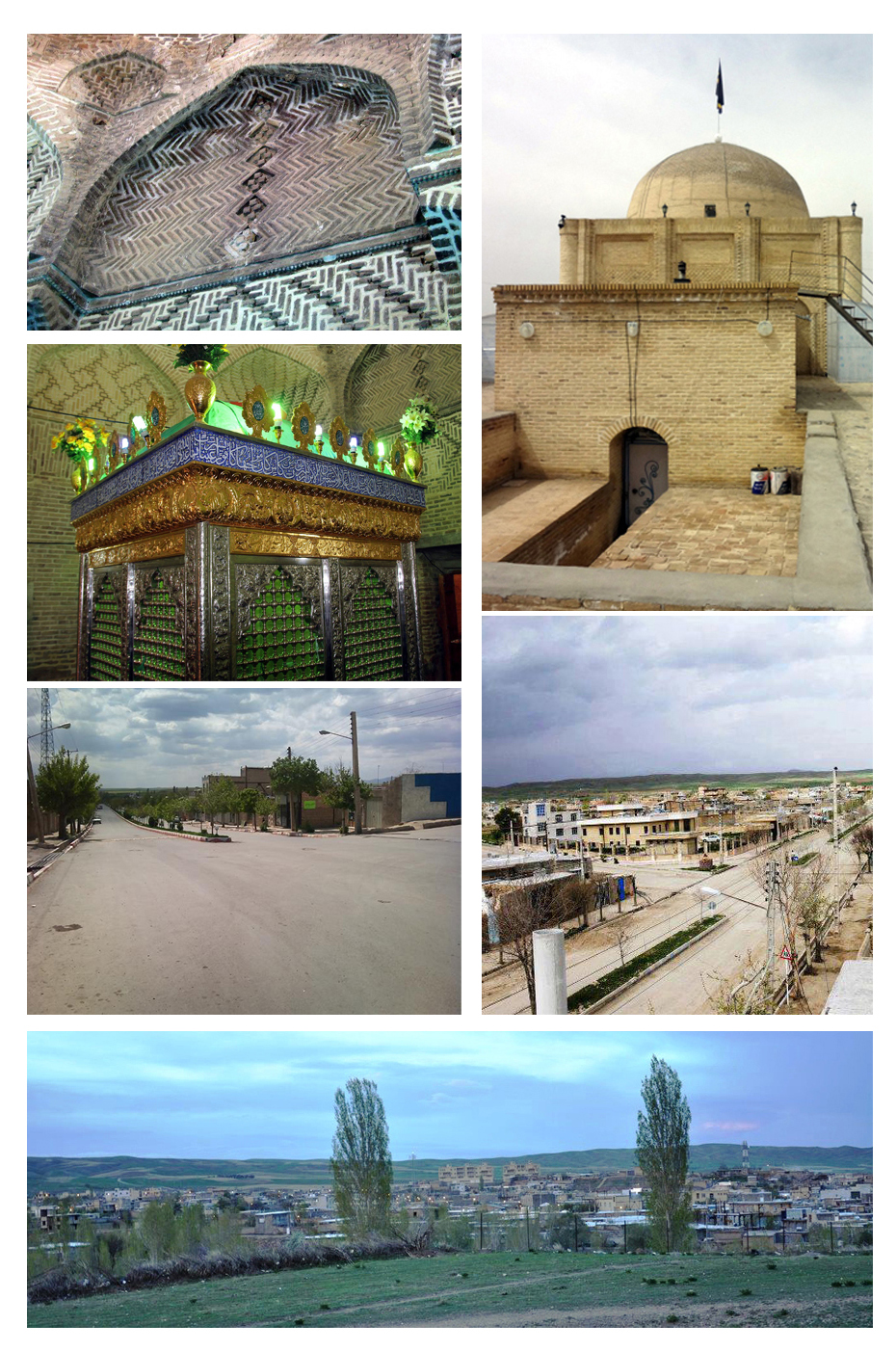

- Location within Iran Location within Iran Kurdistan
- Coordinates: 36°16′59″N 47°44′46″E
- Country: Iran
- Province: Kurdistan
- County: Bijar
- District: Korani

Population (2016)
  - Total: 3,490
- Time zone: UTC+3:30 (IRST)

Yasukand (Persian: یاسوکند) (Note: Also romanized as Yāsūkand; also known as Hasan Ābād-e-Sowgand, Ḩasanābād-e Sūgand, Ḩasanābād-e Yāsūkand, and Korānī) is a city in, and the capital of, Korani District of Bijar County, Kurdistan province, Iran. It also serves as the administrative center for Korani Rural District.

== Demographics ==
=== Ethnicity ===
The city is populated by Turkics.

=== Population ===
At the time of the 2006 National Census, the city's population was 3,268 in 917 households. The following census in 2011 counted 3,784 people in 1,066 households. The 2016 census measured the population of the city as 3,490 people in 1,067 households.
