= Gorgin, Baft =

Gorgin گرگين
- Village
- Location within Iran
- Coordinates: 28°47′57″N 56°10′43″E
- Country: Iran
- Province: Kerman
- County: Baft
- Bakhsh: Central
- Rural District: Khabar

Population (2006)
  - Total: 175
- Time zone: UTC+3:30 (IRST)
  - Summer (DST): UTC+4:30 (IRDT)

Gorgin (Persian: گرگين, also Romanized as Gorgīn; also known as Kargīn, Kergīn, and Kirgin) is a village in Khabar Rural District, in the Central District of Baft County, Kerman Province, Iran. At the 2006 census, its population was 175, in 38 families.
