= Chalab =

Village in Kurdistan province, Iran

Chalab Persian: چالاب
- Village
- Location within Iran Location within Iran Kurdistan
- Coordinates: 36°18′51″N 47°43′06″E
- Country: Iran
- Province: Kurdistan
- County: Bijar
- District: Korani
- Rural District: Korani

Population (2016)
  - Total: 276
- Time zone: UTC+3:30 (IRST)

Chalab (Persian: چالاب) (Note: Also romanized as Chālāb) is a village in Korani Rural District of Korani District in Bijar County, Kurdistan province, Iran.

== Demographics ==
=== Ethnicity ===
The village is primarily inhabited by Azerbaijanis.

=== Population ===
At the time of the 2006 National Census, the village's population was 359 in 71 households. The following census in 2011 counted 305 people in 75 households. The 2016 census measured the population of the village as 276 people in 79 households.
