= Kurt Boeck =

German actor and mountaineer

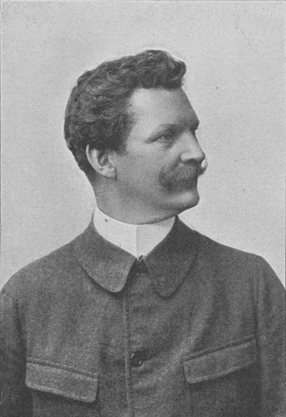
- Portrait of Boeck c. 1900
- Born: Kurt Karl Alexander Oscar Boeck; 10 June 1855; Antonienhütte, Poland
- Died: 4 October 1933 (aged 78)
- Education: University of Göttingen
- Occupations: Actor; mountaineer; chemist

Kurt Karl Alexander Oscar Boeck (10 June 1855 – 4 October 1933) was a German actor and mountaineer who travelled across South Asia in the 1890s, photographed, and wrote on his experiences.

Boeck was born in Antonienhütte where his father was a steel mill owner. He studied philosophy and science while also performing at the Berlin National Theater. He took part in a lead role in "Holbach" directed by Theodor Döring which was well received leading to his being offered a position by Bernhard Pollini. He however decided to return to try and complete his chemistry studies in Göttingen. He received a doctorate in 1879 for his thesis on disulfonic acid of anthracene. He then trained in acting under Karl Gustav Berndal and Heinrich Oberländer at the Dresden court theater. He grew in stature after the retirement of Carl Ferdinand Koberstein and became a teacher in the performing arts at the Royal Conservatory in Dresden in 1884. He moved to Kassel the next year and in 1887 he took up an offer to join on an expedition to Persia and the Caucasus. He travelled to the Himalayas on his own in 1890 along with Tyrol glacier guide Hans Kerner. He took photographs and collected artefacts and specimens of natural history for various German museums. In 1888 he started a photo studio in Rostock. He made several trips to India in 1893, 1895, and 1898–99 and began to give lectures on his travels and write books.

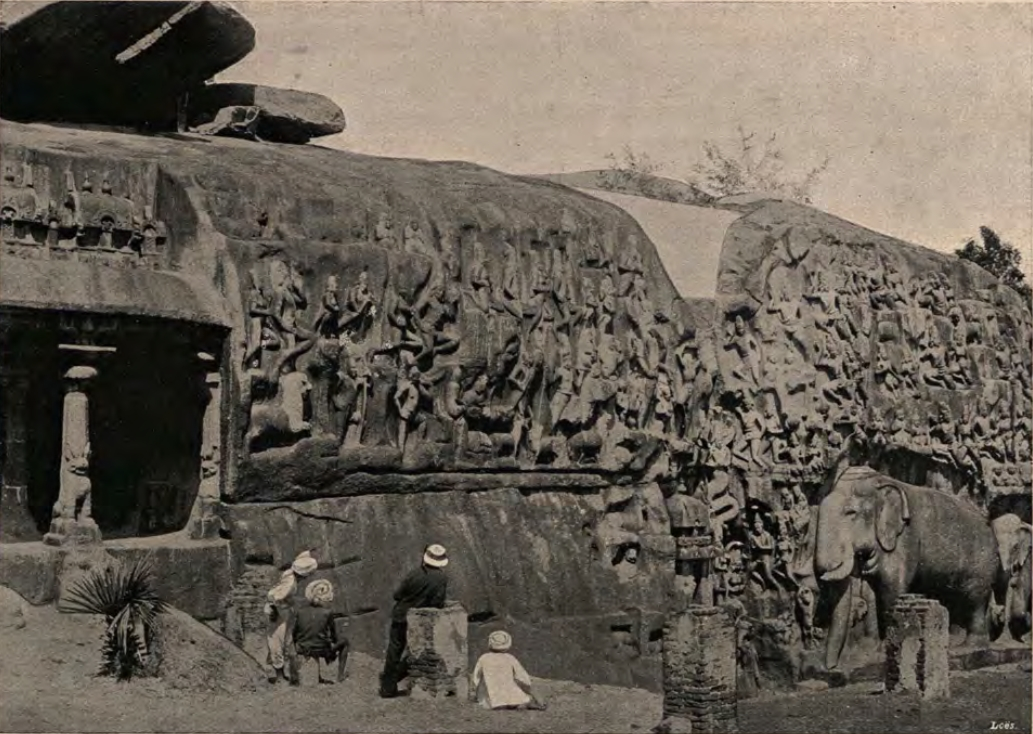
Boeck admiring the bas relief at Mahabalipuram, 1903
