= Hardeol =

Mountain in India

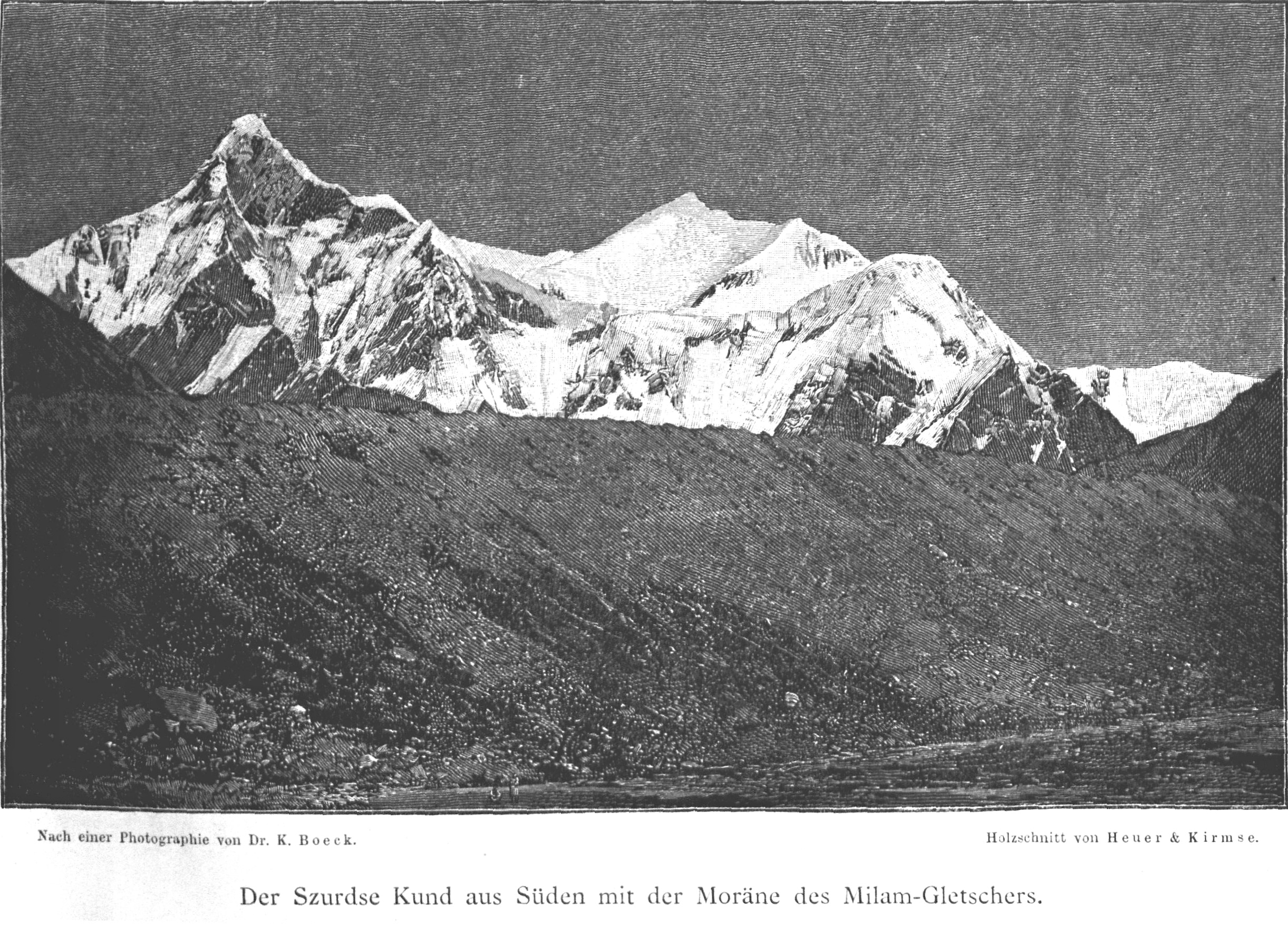
- Hardeol (left) and Tirsuli I, photo by Kurt Boeck in 1890

Highest point
- Elevation: 7,151 m (23,461 ft)
- Prominence: 1,300 m (4,300 ft)
- Coordinates: 30°33′36″N 80°00′36″E

Geography
- Location within India
- Location: Pithoragarh, Uttarakhand, India
- Parent range: Kumaon Himalaya

Climbing
- First ascent: 31 May 1978 by Indo-Tibetan Border Police Expedition

Hardeol or 'Temple of God' is one of the major peaks of the Kumaon Himalaya. It is the highest peak on the northern side of the ring of peaks guarding the Nanda Devi Sanctuary, and lies at the northeast corner of this ring. It is situated at the northern end of the Milam valley, in the Pithoragarh district of Uttarakhand, India. To its immediate north lies Trishuli, and just south is Rishi Pahar, on a north–south trending ridge leading eventually to Nanda Devi East. Hardeol is also known as Trishuli South.

After a reconnaissance in 1939 and a few serious attempts starting in 1967, the first ascent of Hardeol was made by a team from the Indo-Tibetan Border Police on 31 May 1978, led by S. P. Mulasi, climbing from the ridge connecting the peak to Trishuli. Only one further ascent, in 1991, is listed in the Himalayan Index. This ascent, by a large expedition from the Indian Border Security Force, put five members on the summit on 24 September.

The best approach to Hardeol is from the eastern side, through the Ikualari glacier and thence to the right, up the Trishuli valley towards the Hardeol icefall. The nearest road to Hardeol is Munsiyari.
