= Gorgin Rural District =

Rural district in Kurdistan province, Iran

Gorgin Rural District Persian: دهستان گرگين
- Rural District
- Location within Iran Location within Iran Kurdistan
- Coordinates: 36°13′N 47°52′E
- Country: Iran
- Province: Kurdistan
- County: Bijar
- District: Korani
- Established: 1987
- Capital: Gorgin

Population (2016)
  - Total: 1,997
- Time zone: UTC+3:30 (IRST)

Gorgin Rural District (Persian: دهستان گرگين) is in Korani District of Bijar County, Kurdistan province, Iran. Its capital is the village of Gorgin.

== Demographics ==
=== Population ===
At the time of the 2006 National Census, the rural district's population was 2,447 in 570 households. There were 2,065 inhabitants in 573 households at the following census of 2011. The 2016 census measured the population of the rural district as 1,997 in 649 households. The most populous of its 22 villages was Gorgin, with 231 people.

=== Other villages in the rural district ===
- Aghcheh Gonbad
- Gol Qeshlaq
- Kharabeh-ye Chul Arkh
- Qareh Mohammadlu
- Qojur
- Tekiyeh
