= Taghamin Rural District =

Rural district in Kurdistan province, Iran

Taghamin Rural District Persian: دهستان طغامين
- Rural District
- Location within Iran Location within Iran Kurdistan
- Coordinates: 36°18′N 47°31′E
- Country: Iran
- Province: Kurdistan
- County: Bijar
- District: Korani
- Established: 1987
- Capital: Aghbolagh-e Taghamin

Population (2016)
  - Total: 3,137
- Time zone: UTC+3:30 (IRST)

Taghamin Rural District (Persian: دهستان طغامين) is in Korani District of Bijar County, Kurdistan province, Iran. Its capital is the village of Aghbolagh-e Taghamin.

== Demographics ==
=== Population ===
At the time of the 2006 National Census, the rural district's population was 3,781 in 844 households. There were 3,303 inhabitants in 797 households at the following census of 2011. The 2016 census measured the population of the rural district as 3,137 in 908 households. The most populous of its 17 villages was Aghbolagh-e Taghamin, with 468 people.

=== Other villages in the rural district ===
- Bostan Darreh
- Chetaq
- Kur Kureh
- Owch Gonbad-e Khan
- Sarab
- Sharif Kandi
