= Korani Rural District =

Rural district in Kurdistan province, Iran

Korani Rural District Persian: دهستان كراني
- Rural District
- Location within Iran Location within Iran Kurdistan
- Coordinates: 36°17′N 47°41′E
- Country: Iran
- Province: Kurdistan
- County: Bijar
- District: Korani
- Established: 1987
- Capital: Yasukand

Population (2016)
  - Total: 3,913
- Time zone: UTC+3:30 (IRST)

Korani Rural District (Persian: دهستان كراني) is in Korani District of Bijar County, Kurdistan province, Iran. It is administered from the city of Yasukand.

== Demographics ==
=== Population ===
At the time of the 2006 National Census, the rural district's population was 4,775 in 1,078 households. There were 4,463 inhabitants in 1,096 households at the following census of 2011. The 2016 census measured the population of the rural district as 3,913 in 1,176 households. The most populous of its 31 villages was Eslamabad, with 657 people.

=== Other villages in the rural district ===
- Alphut
- Azad Veys-e Olya
- Chalab
- Dadash Kandi
- Qomchoqay
- Sheykh Besharat
