= Dorudfaraman Rural District =

Rural district in Kermanshah province, Iran

Dorudfaraman Rural District Persian: دهستان دورودفرامان
- Rural District
- Location within Iran
- Coordinates: 34°18′10″N 47°16′39″E
- Country: Iran
- Province: Kermanshah
- County: Kermanshah
- District: Central
- Capital: Rahimabad

Population (2016)
  - Total: 24,165
- Time zone: UTC+3:30 (IRST)

Dorudfaraman Rural District (Persian: دهستان دورودفرامان) is in the Central District of Kermanshah County, Kermanshah province, Iran. Its capital is the village of Rahimabad. The previous capital of the rural district was the village of Faraman.

== Demographics ==
=== Population ===
At the time of the 2006 National Census, the rural district's population was 29,608 in 7,028 households. There were 36,550 inhabitants in 9,748 households at the following census of 2011. The 2016 census measured the population of the rural district as 24,165 in 6,183 households. The most populous of its 53 villages was Deh Pahn, with 6,548 people.
