= Korani District =

District in Kurdistan province, Iran

Korani District Persian: بخش کرانی
- District
- Location within Iran Location within Iran Kurdistan
- Coordinates: 36°16′N 47°41′E
- Country: Iran
- Province: Kurdistan
- County: Bijar
- Capital: Yasukand

Population (2016)
  - Total: 12,537
- Time zone: UTC+3:30 (IRST)

Korani District (Persian: بخش کرانی) is in Bijar County, Kurdistan province, Iran. Its capital is the city of Yasukand.

== Demographics ==
=== Population ===
At the time of the 2006 National Census, the district's population was 14,271 in 3,409 households. The following census in 2011 counted 13,615 people in 3,532 households. The 2016 census measured the population of the district as 12,537 inhabitants in 3,800 households.

=== Administrative divisions ===
Korani District Population
Administrative Divisions	2006	2011	2016
Gorgin RD	2,447	2,065	1,997
Korani RD	4,775	4,463	3,913
Taghamin RD	3,781	3,303	3,137
Yasukand (city)	3,268	3,784	3,490
Total	14,271	13,615	12,537
RD = Rural District
