= Tazehabad (disambiguation) =

Tazehabad is a city in Kermanshah Province, Iran.

Tazehabad (Persian: تازه‌آباد), some times rendered as Tazekhabad, may also refer to:

== Ardabil Province ==
- Tazehabad, Parsabad, a village in Parsabad County

== Gilan Province ==
- Tazehabad-e Chomaqestan, a village in Amlash County
- Tazehabad-e Narakeh, a village in Amlash County
- Tazehabad-e Fushazdeh, a village in Astaneh-ye Ashrafiyeh County
- Tazehabad-e Marzian, a village in Astaneh-ye Ashrafiyeh County
- Tazehabad-e Kalashem, a village in Fuman County
- Tazehabad-e Chaf, a neighborhood in Chaf and Chamkhaleh city, Langarud County
- Tazehabad, Langarud, a village in Langarud County
- Tazehabad, Otaqvar, a village in Langarud County
- Tazehabad-e Kord Sara Kuh, a village in Langarud County
- Tazehabad, Khoshk-e Bijar, a village in Rasht County
- Tazehabad, Lasht-e Nesha, a village in Rasht County
- Tazehabad (37°13′ N 49°30′ E), Pasikhan, a village in Rasht County
- Tazehabad-e Khachekin, a village in Khomam County
- Tazehabad-e Sadar, a village in Khomam County
- Tazehabad, Rezvanshahr, a village in Rezvanshahr County
- Tazehabad, Kelachay, a village in Rudsar County
- Tazehabad, Rahimabad, a village in Rudsar County
- Tazehabad-e Pasikhan, a village in Shaft County
- Tazehabad, Siahkal, a village in Siahkal County
- Tazehabad, Talesh, a village in Talesh County

== Golestan Province ==
- Tazehabad, Golestan, a village in Aqqala County

== Ilam Province ==
- Tazehabad, Ilam, a village in Shirvan and Chardaval County

== Kermanshah Province ==
=== Dalahu County ===
- Tazehabad, alternate name of Baba Kuseh-ye Olya, a village in Dalahu County
- Tazehabad-e Mowlai, a village in Dalahu County

=== Eslamabad-e Gharb County ===
- Tazehabad, Eslamabad-e Gharb, a village in Eslamabad-e Gharb County
- Tazehabad-e Darreh Gerd, a village in Eslamabad-e Gharb County
- Tazehabad-e Kukav, a village in Eslamabad-e Gharb County
- Tazehabad-e Taleqan, a village in Eslamabad-e Gharb County

=== Gilan-e Gharb County ===
- Tazehabad-e Bati, a village in Gilan-e Gharb County
- Tazehabad-e Heydarbeygi, a village in Gilan-e Gharb County
- Tazehabad-e Seydali, a village in Gilan-e Gharb County

=== Harsin County ===
- Tazehabad-e Nazliyan, a village in Harsin County

=== Javanrud County ===
- Tazehabad-e Bani Azizi, a village in Javanrud County
- Tazehabad-e Labagh, a village in Javanrud County
- Tazehabad-e Miraki, a village in Javanrud County

=== Kermanshah County ===
- Tazehabad, Kuzaran, a village in Kermanshah County
- Tazehabad-e Amaleh, a village in Kermanshah County
- Tazehabad-e Bidgoli, a village in Kermanshah County
- Tazehabad-e Murchi, a village in Kermanshah County
- Tazehabad-e Namivand, a village in Kermanshah County
- Tazehabad-e Rika, a village in Kermanshah County
- Tazehabad-e Sarab Tiran, a village in Kermanshah County
- Tazehabad-e Sarayilan, a village in Kermanshah County

=== Paveh County ===
- Tazehabad-e Markazi, a village in Paveh County

=== Qasr-e Shirin County ===
- Tazehabad-e Garaveh, a village in Qasr-e Shirin County
- Tazehabad-e Shir Ali, a village in Qasr-e Shirin County

=== Ravansar County ===
- Tazehabad-e Banchia, a village in Ravansar County
- Tazehabad-e Melleh Tarshi, a village in Ravansar County
- Tazehabad-e Serias, a village in Ravansar County

=== Sahneh County ===
- Tazehabad, Sahneh, a village in Sahneh County

=== Salas-e Babajani County ===
- Tazehabad, a city in Salas-e Babajani County
- Tazehabad-e Amin, Kermanshah, a village in Salas-e Babajani County
- Tazehabad-e Gardel Gari, a village in Salas-e Babajani County
- Tazehabad-e Gari Khan Mohammad, a village in Salas-e Babajani County

=== Sarpol-e Zahab County ===
- Tazehabad-e Ahmadi, a village in Sarpol-e Zahab County
- Tazehabad-e Kowliha, a village in Sarpol-e Zahab County

=== Sonqor County ===
- Tazehabad-e Karsavan, a village in Sonqor County
- Tazehabad-e Sarab, a village in Sonqor County

== Kurdistan Province ==
=== Bijar County ===
- Tazehabad, Bijar, a village in Bijar County

=== Dehgolan County ===
- Tazehabad, Dehgolan, a village in Dehgolan County
- Tazehabad, Bolbanabad, a village in Dehgolan County
- Tazehabad-e Gavmishan, a village in Dehgolan County
- Tazehabad-e Qeruchay, a village in Dehgolan County
- Tazehabad-e Tahmasbqoli, a village in Dehgolan County
- Tazehabad, alternate name of Naserabad, Kurdistan, a village in Dehgolan County

=== Divandarreh County ===
- Tazehabad-e Amin, Kurdistan, a village in Divandarreh County
- Tazehabad-e Asef, a village in Divandarreh County
- Tazehabad-e Bozon Qaran, a village in Divandarreh County
- Tazehabad Duleh Rash, a village in Divandarreh County
- Tazehabad-e Galaneh, a village in Divandarreh County
- Tazehabad-e Hijan, a village in Divandarreh County
- Tazehabad-e Maran, a village in Divandarreh County
- Tazehabad-e Qazi Ali, a village in Divandarreh County
- Tazehabad-e Sar Dalan, a village in Divandarreh County
- Tazehabad-e Vazir, a village in Divandarreh County

=== Kamyaran County ===
- Tazehabad-e Dulkoru, a village in Kamyaran County
- Tazehabad-e Gerger, a village in Kamyaran County

=== Marivan County ===
- Tazehabad, Marivan, a village in Marivan County
- Tazehabad, Sarshiv, a village in Marivan County

=== Qorveh County ===
- Tazehabad-e Dizaj, a village in Qorveh County
- Tazehabad-e Jameh Shuran, a village in Qorveh County
- Tazehabad-e Karimabad, a village in Qorveh County
- Tazehabad-e Sar Owriyeh, a village in Qorveh County
- Tazehabad-e Sarab-e Qaht, a village in Qorveh County

=== Sanandaj County ===
- Tazehabad-e Doktor Vase, a village in Sanandaj County
- Tazehabad-e Doveyseh, a village in Sanandaj County
- Tazehabad-e Isaabad, a village in Sanandaj County
- Tazehabad Kikhosrow, a village in Sanandaj County
- Tazehabad-e Qaleh Juq, a village in Sanandaj County
- Tazehabad-e Qaragol, a village in Sanandaj County

=== Saqqez County ===
- Tazehabad, Saqqez, a village in Saqqez County

=== Sarvabad County ===
- Tazehabad, Sarvabad, a village in Sarvabad County

== Lorestan Province ==
- Tazehabad, Delfan, a village in Delfan County
- Tazehabad, Dowreh, a village in Dowreh County
- Tazehabad, Kuhdasht, a village in Kuhdasht County
- Tazehabad Bahram, a village in Delfan County
- Tazehabad Golestaneh, a village in Delfan County

== Mazandaran Province ==
- Tazehabad, Abbasabad, a village in Abbasabad County
- Tazehabad, Amol, a village in Amol County
- Tazehabad, Dabudasht, a village in Amol County
- Tazehabad, Babolsar, a village in Babolsar County
- Tazehabad, Behshahr, a village in Behshahr County
- Tazehabad, Chalus, a village in Chalus County
- Tazehabad, Mahmudabad, a village in Mahmudabad County
- Tazehabad-e Bostan Kheyl, a village in Neka County
- Tazehabad Kola, a village in Neka County
- Tazehabad, Nowshahr, a village in Nowshahr County
- Tazehabad, Sari, a village in Sari County
- Tazehabad-e Jehad, a village in Sari County
- Tazehabad-e Sepah, a village in Miandorud County
- Tazehabad, Tonekabon, a village in Tonekabon County

== Qazvin Province ==
- Tazehabad, Qazvin, a village in Abyek County

== West Azerbaijan Province ==
- Tazehabad, West Azerbaijan, a village in Shahin Dezh County
