= Zagheh (disambiguation) =

Zagheh (Persian: زاغه) may refer to:

== Hamadan Province ==
- Zagheh, Bahar, a village in Bahar County, Hamadan Province, Iran

== Kermanshah Province ==
- Zagheh-ye Bozorg-e Qaleh-ye Ranjbar, a village in Dalahu County
- Zagheh-ye Ali Karam, a village in Gilan-e Gharb County

== Kurdistan Province ==
- Zagheh, Kurdistan, a village in Dehgolan County
- Zagheh-ye Olya, a village in Divandarreh County
- Zagheh-ye Sofla, a village in Divandarreh County

== Lorestan Province ==
- Zagheh, a city in Khorramabad County
- Zagheh, Dorud, a city in Dorud County
- Zagheh District, an administrative subdivision of Khorramabad County

== Markazi Province ==
- Zagheh-ye Akbarabad, a village in Shazand County

== Qazvin Province ==
- Zagheh, Qazvin, a village in Abyek County

== West Azerbaijan Province ==
- Zagheh, Khoy, a village in Khoy County
- Zagheh, Baruq, a village in Baruq County

== Zanjan Province ==
- Zagheh, Zanjan, a village in Khodabandeh County
