= Quri Chay, Iran =

Quri Chay (Persian: قوري چاي) may refer to:

- Quri Chay, Golestan
- Quri Chay, Kermanshah
- Quri Chay, Baneh, Kurdistan Province
- Quri Chay, Bijar, Kurdistan Province
- Quri Chay, Dehgolan, Kurdistan Province
- Quri Chay, West Azerbaijan
- Quri Chay Rural District
- Quri Chay-ye Gharbi Rural District
- Quri Chay-ye Sharqi Rural District
