= Qol Qoleh =

Qol Qoleh or Qolqoleh (Persian: قلقله), also rendered as Qulqulleh, may refer to:

- Qol Qoleh, Dalahu, Kermanshah Province
- Qolqoleh, Salas-e Babajani, Kermanshah Province
- Qolqoleh, Dehgolan, Kurdistan Province
- Qolqoleh, Marivan, Kurdistan Province
- Qolqoleh, Sanandaj, Kurdistan Province
- Qolqoleh, Saqqez, Kurdistan Province
- Qolqoleh, West Azerbaijan
