= Kargabad =

Kargabad كرگ آباد
- Village
- Location within Iran
- Coordinates: 35°16′58″N 47°11′58″E
- Country: Iran
- Province: Kurdistan
- County: Dehgolan
- Bakhsh: Central
- Rural District: Quri Chay

Population (2006)
  - Total: 412
- Time zone: UTC+3:30 (IRST)
  - Summer (DST): UTC+4:30 (IRDT)

Kargabad (Persian: كرگ آباد, also romanized as Kargābād; also known as Gurgābād and Karkābād) is a village in Quri Chay Rural District, in the Central District of Dehgolan County, Kurdistan Province, Iran. At the 2006 census, its population was 412, in 89 families. The village is populated by Kurds.
