= Hasanabad, Dehgolan =

Village in Kurdistan province, Iran

Hasanabad Persian: حسن آباد
- Village
- Location within Iran Location within Iran Kurdistan
- Coordinates: 35°15′42″N 47°27′00″E
- Country: Iran
- Province: Kurdistan
- County: Dehgolan
- District: Central
- Rural District: Howmeh-ye Dehgolan

Population (2016)
  - Total: 195
- Time zone: UTC+3:30 (IRST)

Hasanabad (Persian: حسن آباد) (Note: Also romanized as Ḩasanābād; also known as Ḩoseynābād and Husainābād) is a village in, and the capital of, Howmeh-ye Dehgolan Rural District in the Central District of Dehgolan County, Kurdistan province, Iran.

== Demographics ==
=== Ethnicity ===
The village is populated by Kurds.

=== Population ===
At the time of the 2006 National Census, the village's population was 177 in 39 households, when it was in the former Yeylaq District of Qorveh County. The following census in 2011 counted 184 people in 52 households, by which time the district had been separated from the county in the establishment of Dehgolan County. The rural district was transferred to the new Central District. The 2016 census measured the population of the village as 195 people in 58 households.
