= Kuleh Bayan =

Kuleh Bayan كوله بيان
- Village
- Location within Iran
- Coordinates: 35°25′29″N 47°13′18″E
- Country: Iran
- Province: Kurdistan
- County: Dehgolan
- Bakhsh: Central
- Rural District: Quri Chay

Population (2006)
  - Total: 36
- Time zone: UTC+3:30 (IRST)
  - Summer (DST): UTC+4:30 (IRDT)

Kuleh Bayan (Persian: كوله بيان, also Romanized as Kūleh Bayān, Kūlahbayān, and Kūleh Beyān; also known as Qulleh Biyān) is a village in Quri Chay Rural District, in the Central District of Dehgolan County, Kurdistan Province, Iran. At the 2006 census, it had a population of 36, with 10 families. The village is populated by Kurds.
