= Sorkheh Jub =

Sorkheh Jub سرخه جوب
- Village
- Location within Iran
- Coordinates: 35°20′41″N 47°31′08″E
- Country: Iran
- Province: Kurdistan
- County: Dehgolan
- Bakhsh: Central
- Rural District: Howmeh-ye Dehgolan

Population (2006)
  - Total: 243
- Time zone: UTC+3:30 (IRST)
  - Summer (DST): UTC+4:30 (IRDT)

Sorkheh Jub (Persian: سرخه جوب, also Romanized as Sorkheh Jūb) is a village in Howmeh-ye Dehgolan Rural District, in the Central District of Dehgolan County, Kurdistan Province, Iran. At the 2006 census, its population was 243, in 51 families. The village is populated by Kurds.
