= Meymunabad =

Meymunabad ميمون آباد
- Village
- Location within Iran
- Coordinates: 35°06′41″N 47°16′32″E
- Country: Iran
- Province: Kurdistan
- County: Dehgolan
- Bakhsh: Bolbanabad
- Rural District: Sis

Population (2006)
  - Total: 122
- Time zone: UTC+3:30 (IRST)
  - Summer (DST): UTC+4:30 (IRDT)

Meymunabad (Persian: ميمون آباد, also Romanized as Meymūnābād; also known as Mehmānābād and Moḩammadābād) is a village in Sis Rural District, Bolbanabad District, Dehgolan County, Kurdistan Province, Iran. At the 2006 census, its population was 122, in 28 families. The village is populated by Kurds.
