= Arazand =

Arazand ارزند
- Village
- Location within Iran
- Coordinates: 35°17′59″N 47°30′07″E
- Country: Iran
- Province: Kurdistan
- County: Dehgolan
- Bakhsh: Central
- Rural District: Howmeh-ye Dehgolan

Population (2006)
  - Total: 416
- Time zone: UTC+3:30 (IRST)
  - Summer (DST): UTC+4:30 (IRDT)

Arazand (Persian: ارزند, also Romanized as Ārazand, Ārezand, and Ārzand; also known as Arazānī and Tāzehāwa Arazānī) is a village in Howmeh-ye Dehgolan Rural District, in the Central District of Dehgolan County, Kurdistan Province, Iran. At the 2006 census, its population was 416, in 92 families. The village is populated by Kurds.
