= Baleh Dasti =

Village in Kurdistan province, Iran

Baleh Dasti Persian: بله دستي
- Village
- Location within Iran Location within Iran Kurdistan
- Coordinates: 35°26′06″N 47°23′55″E
- Country: Iran
- Province: Kurdistan
- County: Dehgolan
- District: Central
- Rural District: Yeylaq-e Shomali

Population (2016)
  - Total: 1,241
- Time zone: UTC+3:30 (IRST)

Baleh Dasti (Persian: بله دستي) (Note: Also romanized as Baleh Dastī; also known as Balādasī, Baladastī, and Bālā Dastī) is a village in, and the capital of, Yeylaq-e Shomali Rural District of the Central District of Dehgolan County, Kurdistan province, Iran.

== Demographics ==
=== Ethnicity ===
The village is populated by Kurds.

=== Population ===
At the time of the 2006 National Census, the village's population was 1,162 in 286 households, when it was in the former Yeylaq District of Qorveh County. The following census in 2011 counted 1,314 people in 347 households, by which time the district had been separated from the county in the establishment of Dehgolan County. The rural district was transferred to the new Central District. The 2016 census measured the population of the village as 1,241 people in 366 households. It was the most populous village in its rural district.
