= Qeshlaq-e Khoda Karam =

Qeshlan-e Khoda Karam قشلاق خداكرم
- Village
- Location within Iran
- Coordinates: 35°27′14″N 47°27′44″E
- Country: Iran
- Province: Kurdistan
- County: Dehgolan
- Bakhsh: Central
- Rural District: Yeylan-e Shomali

Population (2006)
  - Total: 69
- Time zone: UTC+3:30 (IRST)
  - Summer (DST): UTC+4:30 (IRDT)

Qeshlan-e Khoda Karam (Persian: قشلاق خداكرم, also Romanized as Qeshlāq-e Khodā Karam; also known as Qeshlāq-e Khākaram and Qishlāq Khakaram) is a village in Yeylan-e Shomali Rural District, in the Central District of Dehgolan County, Kurdistan Province, Iran. At the 2006 census, its population was 69, in 17 families. The village is populated by Kurds.
