= Serenjianeh =

Serenjianeh سرنجيانه
- Village
- Location within Iran
- Coordinates: 35°11′42″N 47°20′59″E
- Country: Iran
- Province: Kurdistan
- County: Dehgolan
- Bakhsh: Bolbanabad
- Rural District: Sis

Population (2006)
  - Total: 1,342
- Time zone: UTC+3:30 (IRST)
  - Summer (DST): UTC+4:30 (IRDT)

Serenjianeh (Persian: سرنجيانه, also Romanized as Serenjīāneh, Saranjeyāneh, Saranjīāneh, and Serenjeyāneh; also known as Sīrenjāneh and Sīrīnjāneh) is a village in Sis Rural District, Bolbanabad District, Dehgolan County, Kurdistan Province, Iran. At the 2006 census, its population was 1,342, in 327 families. The village is populated by Kurds.
