= Bageh Jan =

Bageh Jan بگه جان
- Village
- Location within Iran
- Coordinates: 35°22′07″N 47°26′53″E
- Country: Iran
- Province: Kurdistan
- County: Dehgolan
- Bakhsh: Central
- Rural District: Yeylan-e Shomali

Population (2006)
  - Total: 656
- Time zone: UTC+3:30 (IRST)
  - Summer (DST): UTC+4:30 (IRDT)

Bageh Jan (Persian: بگه جان, also Romanized as Bageh Jān and Bagahjān; also known as Bāgh-e Jān and Bāgh-ī-Jān) is a village in Yeylan-e Shomali Rural District, in the Central District of Dehgolan County, Kurdistan Province, Iran. At the 2006 census, its population was 656, in 128 families. The village is populated by Kurds.
