= Kani Pahan =

Kani Pahan كاني پهن
- Village
- Location within Iran
- Coordinates: 35°18′44″N 47°12′26″E
- Country: Iran
- Province: Kurdistan
- County: Dehgolan
- Bakhsh: Central
- Rural District: Quri Chay

Population (2006)
  - Total: 257
- Time zone: UTC+3:30 (IRST)
  - Summer (DST): UTC+4:30 (IRDT)

Kani Pahan (Persian: كاني پهن, also Romanized as Kānī Pahan; also known as Kānī Pān) is a village in Quri Chay Rural District, in the Central District of Dehgolan County, Kurdistan Province, Iran. At the 2006 census, its population was 257, in 61 families. The village is populated by Kurds.
