= Bashmaq =

Bashmaq (Persian: باشماق) may refer to:

- Bashmaq, Hashtrud, East Azerbaijan Province
- Bashmaq, Meyaneh, East Azerbaijan Province
- Bashmaq, Dehgolan, Kurdistan Province
- Bashmaq, Marivan, Kurdistan Province
- Bashmaq, Saqqez, Kurdistan Province
