= Tazeh Deh =

Tazeh Deh (Persian: تازه ده) may refer to:

- Tazeh Deh, Kermanshah
- Tazeh Deh, Divandarreh, Kurdistan Province
- Tazeh Deh, Sanandaj, Kurdistan Province
- Tazeh Deh, Razavi Khorasan
