= Kakah Jub =

Kakah Jub كاكه جوب
- Village
- Location within Iran
- Coordinates: 35°23′49″N 47°24′44″E
- Country: Iran
- Province: Kurdistan
- County: Dehgolan
- Bakhsh: Central
- Rural District: Yeylan-e Shomali

Population (2006)
  - Total: 289
- Time zone: UTC+3:30 (IRST)
  - Summer (DST): UTC+4:30 (IRDT)

Kakah Jub (Persian: كاكه جوب, also Romanized as Kākah Jūb and Kākeh Jūb; also known as Kāka Ju, Kākā Jūb, and Kākeh Jū) is a village in Yeylan-e Shomali Rural District, in the Central District of Dehgolan County, Kurdistan Province, Iran. At the 2006 census, its population was 289, in 69 families. The village is populated by Kurds.
