= Shah Jub =

Shah Jub شاه جوب
- Village
- Location within Iran
- Coordinates: 35°07′26″N 47°23′11″E
- Country: Iran
- Province: Kurdistan
- County: Dehgolan
- Bakhsh: Bolbanabad
- Rural District: Yeylan-e Jonubi

Population (2006)
  - Total: 284
- Time zone: UTC+3:30 (IRST)
  - Summer (DST): UTC+4:30 (IRDT)

Shah Jub (Persian: شاه جوب, also Romanized as Shāh Jūb; also known as Shāh Chūb and Shah Ju) is a village in Yeylan-e Jonubi Rural District, Bolbanabad District, Dehgolan County, Kurdistan Province, Iran. At the 2006 census, its population was 284, in 75 families. The village is populated by Kurds.
