= Sarab-e Dowkal =

Sarab-e Dowkal سراب دوكل
- Village
- Location within Iran
- Coordinates: 35°09′50″N 47°15′23″E
- Country: Iran
- Province: Kurdistan
- County: Dehgolan
- Bakhsh: Bolbanabad
- Rural District: Sis

Population (2006)
  - Total: 136
- Time zone: UTC+3:30 (IRST)
  - Summer (DST): UTC+4:30 (IRDT)

Sarab-e Dowkal (Persian: سراب دوكل, also Romanized as Sarāb-e Dowkāl, Sarāb Do Kal, Sarāb Dukāl, and Sarāb-e Do Kal; also known as Sarab Dogol) is a village in Sis Rural District, Bolbanabad District, Dehgolan County, Kurdistan Province, Iran. At the 2006 census, its population was 136, in 32 families. The village is populated by Kurds.
