= Mobarakabad-e Kalleh Rash =

Mobarakabad-e Kalleh Rash مبارک‌آباد کله‌رش
- Village
- Location within Iran
- Coordinates: 35°12′46″N 47°23′32″E
- Country: Iran
- Province: Kurdistan
- County: Dehgolan
- Bakhsh: Bolbanabad
- Rural District: Sis

Population (2006)
  - Total: 669
- Time zone: UTC+3:30 (IRST)
  - Summer (DST): UTC+4:30 (IRDT)

Mobarakabad-e Kalleh Rash (Persian: مبارک‌آباد کله‌رش, also Romanized as Mobārakābād-e Kalleh Rash, Mobārākābād-e Koleh Rash, Mobārakābād Kalleh Rash, and Mobārakābād-e Kalehrash; also known as Daklehrash, Kalleh-ye Rash, Kularash, Mobārakābād, Qal‘eh-ye Rash, and Qulleh Rash) is a village in Sis Rural District, Bolbanabad District, Dehgolan County, Kurdistan Province, Iran. At the 2006 census, its population was 669, in 160 families. The village is populated by Kurds.
