= Sis, Kurdistan =

Village in Kurdistan province, Iran

Sis Persian: سيس
- Village
- Location within Iran Location within Iran Kurdistan
- Coordinates: 35°12′15″N 47°16′43″E
- Country: Iran
- Province: Kurdistan
- County: Dehgolan
- District: Bolbanabad
- Rural District: Sis

Population (2016)
  - Total: 1,645
- Time zone: UTC+3:30 (IRST)

Sis (Persian: سيس) (Note: Also romanized as Sīs; also known as Sebīs and Sehbīs) is a village in, and the capital of, Sis Rural District of Bolbanabad District, Dehgolan County, Kurdistan province, Iran.

== Demographics ==
=== Ethnicity ===
The village is populated by Kurds.

=== Population ===
At the time of the 2006 National Census, the village's population was 1,463 in 335 households, when it was in Yeylaq-e Jonubi Rural District of the former Yeylaq District of Qorveh County. The following census in 2011 counted 1,644 people in 423 households, by which time the district had been separated from the county in the establishment of Dehgolan County. The rural district was transferred to the new Bolbanabad District, and Sis was transferred to Sis Rural District created in the district. The 2016 census measured the population of the village as 1,645 people in 477 households. It was the most populous village in its rural district.
