= Sural =

Sural سورال
- Village
- Location within Iran
- Coordinates: 35°11′01″N 47°14′16″E
- Country: Iran
- Province: Kurdistan
- County: Dehgolan
- Bakhsh: Bolbanabad
- Rural District: Sis

Population (2006)
  - Total: 241
- Time zone: UTC+3:30 (IRST)
  - Summer (DST): UTC+4:30 (IRDT)

Sural (Persian: سورال, also Romanized as Sūrāl; also known as Surhāl) is a village in Sis Rural District, Bolbanabad District, Dehgolan County, Kurdistan province, Iran. At the 2006 census, its population was 241, in 56 families. The village is populated by Kurds.
