= Moradabad, Kurdistan =

Moradabad مراد آباد
- Village
- Location within Iran
- Coordinates: 35°04′47″N 47°19′25″E
- Country: Iran
- Province: Kurdistan
- County: Dehgolan
- Bakhsh: Bolbanabad
- Rural District: Yeylan-e Jonubi

Population (2006)
  - Total: 381
- Time zone: UTC+3:30 (IRST)
  - Summer (DST): UTC+4:30 (IRDT)

Moradabad (Persian: مراد آباد, also Romanized as Morādābād; also known as Amīrābād and Mīrābād) is a village in Yeylan-e Jonubi Rural District, Bolbanabad District, Dehgolan County, Kurdistan Province, Iran. At the 2006 census, its population was 381, in 74 families. The village is populated by Kurds.
