= Asiab Jub =

Asiab Jub (Persian: اسياب جوب or آسياب جوب) may refer to:

- Asiab Jub, Kermanshah (اسياب جوب)
- Asiab Jub-e Farmanfarma, Kermanshah Province
- Asiab Jub, Kurdistan (آسياب جوب)
