= Gorganeh =

Gorganeh گرگانه
- Village
- Location within Iran
- Coordinates: 35°07′52″N 47°21′57″E
- Country: Iran
- Province: Kurdistan
- County: Dehgolan
- Bakhsh: Bolbanabad
- Rural District: Yeylan-e Jonubi

Population (2006)
  - Total: 185
- Time zone: UTC+3:30 (IRST)
  - Summer (DST): UTC+4:30 (IRDT)

Gorganeh (Persian: گرگانه, also Romanized as Gorgāneh; also known as Gurganeh) is a village in Yeylan-e Jonubi Rural District, Bolbanabad District, Dehgolan County, Kurdistan Province, Iran. At the 2006 census, its population was 185, in 46 families. The village is populated by Kurds.
