= Cheraghabad, Kurdistan =

Cheraghabad چراغ آباد
- Village
- Location within Iran
- Coordinates: 35°13′00″N 47°19′22″E
- Country: Iran
- Province: Kurdistan
- County: Dehgolan
- Bakhsh: Bolbanabad
- Rural District: Sis

Population (2006)
  - Total: 439
- Time zone: UTC+3:30 (IRST)
  - Summer (DST): UTC+4:30 (IRDT)

Cheraghabad (Persian: چراغ آباد, also Romanized as Cherāghābād; also known as Chiraghābād) is a village in Sis Rural District, Bolbanabad District, Dehgolan County, Kurdistan Province, Iran. At the 2006 census, its population was 439, in 108 families. The village is populated by Kurds.
