= Barya Khan =

Village in northwestern Iran

Barya Khan برياخان
- Village
- Location within Iran
- Coordinates: 35°27′59″N 47°25′57″E
- Country: Iran
- Province: Kurdistan
- County: Dehgolan
- Bakhsh: Central
- Rural District: Yeylan-e Shomali

Population (2006)
  - Total: 98
- Time zone: UTC+3:30 (IRST)
  - Summer (DST): UTC+4:30 (IRDT)

Barya Khan (Kurdish:بریاخان, also Romanized as Baryā Khān and Beryā Khān; also known as Biria Khan) is a village in Yeylan-e Shomali Rural District, in the Central District of Dehgolan County, Kurdistan Province, Iran. At the 2006 census, its population was 98, in 25 families. The village is populated by Kurds.
