= Karvandan =

Village in Kurdistan province, Iran

Karvandan Persian: كروندان
- Village
- Location within Iran Location within Iran Kurdistan
- Coordinates: 35°18′59″N 47°21′41″E
- Country: Iran
- Province: Kurdistan
- County: Dehgolan
- District: Central
- Rural District: Howmeh-ye Dehgolan

Population (2016)
  - Total: 1,546
- Time zone: UTC+3:30 (IRST)

Karvandan (Persian: كروندان) (Note: Also romanized as Karvandān; also known as Karonān and Karūnān) is a village in Howmeh-ye Dehgolan Rural District of the Central District in Dehgolan County, Kurdistan province, Iran.

== Demographics ==
=== Ethnicity ===
The village is populated by Kurds.

=== Population ===
At the time of the 2006 National Census, the village's population was 1,428 in 325 households, when it was in the former Yeylaq District of Qorveh County. The following census in 2011 counted 1,599 people in 444 households, by which time the district had been separated from the county in the establishment of Dehgolan County. The rural district was transferred to the new Central District. The 2016 census measured the population of the village as 1,546 people in 490 households, the most populous in its rural district.
