= Akhi Kamal =

Akhi Kamal آخي كمال
- Village
- Location within Iran
- Coordinates: 35°25′53″N 47°27′19″E
- Country: Iran
- Province: Kurdistan
- County: Dehgolan
- Bakhsh: Central
- Rural District: Yeylan-e Shomali

Population (2006)
  - Total: 75
- Time zone: UTC+3:30 (IRST)
  - Summer (DST): UTC+4:30 (IRDT)

Akhi Kamal (Persian: آخي كمال, also Romanized as Ākhī Kamāl and Akhī Kamāl) is a village in Yeylan-e Shomali Rural District, in the Central District of Dehgolan County, Kurdistan Province, Iran. At the 2006 census, its population was 75, in 15 families. The village is populated by Kurds.
