= Si va Seh Mardeh =

Si va Seh Mardeh سي وسه مرده
- Village
- Location within Iran
- Coordinates: 35°30′23″N 47°24′48″E
- Country: Iran
- Province: Kurdistan
- County: Dehgolan
- Bakhsh: Central
- Rural District: Yeylan-e Shomali

Population (2006)
  - Total: 55
- Time zone: UTC+3:30 (IRST)
  - Summer (DST): UTC+4:30 (IRDT)

Si va Seh Mardeh (Persian: سي وسه مرده, also Romanized as Sī va Seh Mardeh and Sīow Seh Mardeh; also known as Sūsehmard and Su Shehmard) is a village in Yeylan-e Shomali Rural District, in the Central District of Dehgolan County, Kurdistan Province, Iran. At the 2006 census, its population was 55, in 14 families. The village is populated by Kurds.
