= Ali Panik =

Ali Panik عالي پنيك
- Village
- Location within Iran
- Coordinates: 35°26′11″N 47°11′30″E
- Country: Iran
- Province: Kurdistan
- County: Dehgolan
- Bakhsh: Central
- Rural District: Quri Chay

Population (2006)
  - Total: 659
- Time zone: UTC+3:30 (IRST)
  - Summer (DST): UTC+4:30 (IRDT)

Ali Panik (Persian: عالي پنيك, also Romanized as ‘Ālī Panīk and Ālī Panīk; also known as ‘Ālī Pīnak, Ālī Pīnak, Ālī Pīnek, and Ālū Pīnek) is a village in Quri Chay Rural District, in the Central District of Dehgolan County, Kurdistan Province, Iran. At the 2006 census, its population was 659, in 148 families. The village is populated by Kurds.
