= Khezerlak =

Khezerlak خضرلك
- Village
- Location within Iran
- Coordinates: 35°32′30″N 47°20′14″E
- Country: Iran
- Province: Kurdistan
- County: Dehgolan
- Bakhsh: Central
- Rural District: Yeylan-e Shomali

Population (2006)
  - Total: 160
- Time zone: UTC+3:30 (IRST)
  - Summer (DST): UTC+4:30 (IRDT)

Khezerlak (Persian: خضرلك, also Romanized as Kheẕerlak and Khezer Lak; also known as Kheyr Lāgh, Kheyrlāqeh, and Khailak) is a village in Yeylan-e Shomali Rural District, in the Central District of Dehgolan County, Kurdistan Province, Iran. At the 2006 census, its population was 160, in 38 families. The village is populated by Kurds.
