= Hajjiabad-e Bozorg =

Hajjiabad-e Bozorg حاجي آباد بزرگ
- Village
- Location within Iran
- Coordinates: 35°01′48″N 47°21′22″E
- Country: Iran
- Province: Kurdistan
- County: Dehgolan
- Bakhsh: Bolbanabad
- Rural District: Yeylan-e Jonubi

Population (2006)
  - Total: 378
- Time zone: UTC+3:30 (IRST)
  - Summer (DST): UTC+4:30 (IRDT)

Hajjiabad-e Bozorg (Persian: حاجي آباد بزرگ, also Romanized as Ḩājjīābād-e Bozorg; also known as Ḩājīabād and Ḩājjīābād) is a village in Yeylan-e Jonubi Rural District, Bolbanabad District, Dehgolan County, Kurdistan Province, Iran. At the 2006 census, its population was 378, in 74 families. The village is populated by Kurds.
