= Chilak =

Chilak چيلك
- Village
- Location within Iran
- Coordinates: 35°16′03″N 47°13′46″E
- Country: Iran
- Province: Kurdistan
- County: Dehgolan
- Bakhsh: Central
- Rural District: Quri Chay

Population (2006)
  - Total: 170
- Time zone: UTC+3:30 (IRST)
  - Summer (DST): UTC+4:30 (IRDT)

Chilak (Persian: چيلك, also Romanized as Chīlak and Chīlek) is a village in Quri Chay Rural District, in the Central District of Dehgolan County, Kurdistan Province, Iran. At the 2006 census, its population was 170, in 34 families. The village is populated by Kurds.
