= Miraki =

Miraki ميركي
- Village
- Location within Iran
- Coordinates: 35°26′10″N 47°17′30″E
- Country: Iran
- Province: Kurdistan
- County: Dehgolan
- Bakhsh: Central
- Rural District: Quri Chay

Population (2006)
  - Total: 687
- Time zone: UTC+3:30 (IRST)
  - Summer (DST): UTC+4:30 (IRDT)

Miraki (Persian: ميركي, also Romanized as Mīrakī) is a village in Quri Chay Rural District, in the Central District of Dehgolan County, Kurdistan Province, Iran. At the 2006 census, its population was 687, in 154 families. The village is populated by Kurds.
