= Tazehabad-e Qeruchay =

Tazehabad-e Qeruchay تازه آباد قروچاي
- Village
- Location within Iran
- Coordinates: 35°22′33″N 47°15′56″E
- Country: Iran
- Province: Kurdistan
- County: Dehgolan
- Bakhsh: Central
- Rural District: Quri Chay

Population (2006)
  - Total: 277
- Time zone: UTC+3:30 (IRST)
  - Summer (DST): UTC+4:30 (IRDT)

Tazehabad-e Qeruchay (Persian: تازه آباد قروچاي, also Romanized as Tāzehābād-e Qerūchāy; also known as Tāzehābād and Tāzehābād-e Qūrīchāy) is a village in Quri Chay Rural District, in the Central District of Dehgolan County, Kurdistan Province, Iran. At the 2006 census, its population was 277, in 64 families. The village is populated by Kurds.
