= Saedabad =

Saedabad (Persian: ساعيد آباد) may refer to:

- Saedabad, Dehgolan
- Saedabad, Kamyaran
