= Telvar, Kurdistan =

Telvar تلوار
- Village
- Location within Iran
- Coordinates: 35°21′00″N 47°26′41″E
- Country: Iran
- Province: Kurdistan
- County: Dehgolan
- Bakhsh: Central
- Rural District: Howmeh-ye Dehgolan

Population (2006)
  - Total: 406
- Time zone: UTC+3:30 (IRST)
  - Summer (DST): UTC+4:30 (IRDT)

Telvar (Persian: تلوار, also Romanized as Telvār) is a village in Howmeh-ye Dehgolan Rural District, in the Central District of Dehgolan County, Kurdistan Province, Iran. At the 2006 census, its population was 406, in 85 families. The village is populated by Kurds.
