= Gizmel =

Gizmel or Gizmal (Persian: گيزمل), also rendered as Gazmel or Gezmel or Gezmil or Gizmil or Kizmel, may refer to:

- Gizmel-e Olya
- Gizmel-e Sofla
