= Qader Marz =

Qader Marz (Persian: قادرمرز), also known as Qader Maz or Qadir Maz, may refer to:

- Qader Marz, Kermanshah
- Qader Marz, Kurdistan
