= Qaleh Valianeh =

Qaleh Valianeh قلعه وليانه
- Village
- Location within Iran
- Coordinates: 35°43′58″N 46°43′52″E
- Country: Iran
- Province: Kurdistan
- County: Divandarreh
- Bakhsh: Saral
- Rural District: Saral

Population (2006)
  - Total: 260
- Time zone: UTC+3:30 (IRST)
  - Summer (DST): UTC+4:30 (IRDT)

Qaleh Valianeh (Persian: قلعه وليانه, also Romanized as Qal‘eh Valīāneh) is a village in Saral Rural District, Saral District, Divandarreh County, Kurdistan Province, Iran. At the 2006 census, its population was 260, in 41 families. The village is populated by Kurds.
