= Tazehabad-e Tahmasbqoli =

Village in Kurdistan, Iran

Tazehabad-e Tahmasbqoli تازه آباد طهماسبقلي
- Village
- Location within Iran
- Coordinates: 35°14′47″N 47°29′30″E
- Country: Iran
- Province: Kurdistan
- County: Dehgolan
- Bakhsh: Central
- Rural District: Howmeh-ye Dehgolan

Population (2006)
  - Total: 108
- Time zone: UTC+3:30 (IRST)
  - Summer (DST): UTC+4:30 (IRDT)

Tazehabad-e Tahmasbqoli (Persian: تازه آباد طهماسبقلي, also Romanized as Tāzehābād-e Ţahmāsbqolī; also known as Tāzehābād) is a village in Howmeh-ye Dehgolan Rural District, in the Central District of Dehgolan County, Kurdistan Province, Iran. At the 2006 census, its population was 108, in 29 families. The village is populated by Kurds.
