= Gerd Miran =

Gerd Miran or Gerdmiran (Persian: گردميران), also rendered as Gird Miran, may refer to:

- Gerd Miran-e Olya
- Gerd Miran-e Sofla
