= Mishab =

Mishab (Persian: ميشاب) may refer to:

- Mishab, Isfahan
- Mishab, Kurdistan
- Mishab-e Shomali Rural District, in East Azerbaijan Province
