= Gazgazareh =

Gazgazareh or Gaz Gezareh (Persian: گزگزاره), also rendered as Gazgazar or Gaz Gazar or Gar Gezareh may refer to:

- Gazgazareh-ye Olya
- Gazgazareh-ye Sofla
