= Gerd Miran-e Olya =

Village in Kurdistan province, Iran

Gerd Miran-e Olya Persian: گردميران عليا
- Village
- Location within Iran Location within Iran Kurdistan
- Coordinates: 35°05′47″N 47°21′43″E
- Country: Iran
- Province: Kurdistan
- County: Dehgolan
- District: Bolbanabad
- Rural District: Yeylaq-e Jonubi

Population (2016)
  - Total: 1,707
- Time zone: UTC+3:30 (IRST)

Gerd Miran-e Olya (Persian: گردميران عليا) (Note: Also romanized as Gerd Mīrān-e ‘Olyā and Gerdmīrān-e ‘Olyā; also known as Gerd Mīrān-e Bālā and Gird Mirān) is a village in, and the capital of, Yeylaq-e Jonubi Rural District of Bolbanabad District, Dehgolan County, Kurdistan province, Iran. The previous capital of the rural district was the village of Bolbanabad, now a city.

== Demographics ==
=== Ethnicity ===
The village is populated by Kurds.

=== Population ===
At the time of the 2006 National Census, the village's population was 1,727 in 383 households, when it was in the former Yeylaq District of Qorveh County. The following census in 2011 counted 1,663 people in 474 households, by which time the district had been separated from the county in the establishment of Dehgolan County. The rural district was transferred to the new Bolbanabad District. The 2016 census measured the population of the village as 1,707 people in 534 households. It was the most populous village in its rural district.
