= Dareveyan-e Fares =

Dareveyan-e Fares درويان فارس
- Village
- Location within Iran
- Coordinates: 35°40′20″N 46°39′29″E
- Country: Iran
- Province: Kurdistan
- County: Divandarreh
- Bakhsh: Saral
- Rural District: Saral

Population (2006)
  - Total: 97
- Time zone: UTC+3:30 (IRST)
  - Summer (DST): UTC+4:30 (IRDT)

Dareveyan-e Fares (Persian: درويان فارس, also Romanized as Dareveyān-e Fāres; also known as Dareveyān and Darreh Vīān) is a village in Saral Rural District, Saral District, Divandarreh County, Kurdistan Province, Iran. At the 2006 census, its population was 97, in 19 families. The village is populated by Kurds.
