= Tazehabad, Bolbanabad =

Tazehabad تازه آباد
- Village
- Location within Iran
- Coordinates: 35°14′46″N 47°21′37″E
- Country: Iran
- Province: Kurdistan
- County: Dehgolan
- Bakhsh: Bolbanabad
- Rural District: Sis

Population (2006)
  - Total: 370
- Time zone: UTC+3:30 (IRST)
  - Summer (DST): UTC+4:30 (IRDT)

Tazehabad (Persian: تازه آباد, also Romanized as Tāzehābād; also known as Tāzehābād-e Cherāghābād) is a village in Sis Rural District, Bolbanabad District, Dehgolan County, Kurdistan Province, Iran. At the 2006 census, its population was 370, in 87 families. The village is populated by Kurds.
