= Tazehabad, Dehgolan =

Tazehabad kanigulzar تازه آباد کانی گلزار
- Village
- Location within Iran
- Coordinates: 35°22′05″N 47°08′28″E
- Country: Iran
- Province: Kurdistan
- County: Dehgolan
- Bakhsh: Central
- Rural District: Quri Chay

Population (2006)
  - Total: 214
- Time zone: UTC+3:30 (IRST)
  - Summer (DST): UTC+4:30 (IRDT)

Tazehabad (Persian: تازه آباد, also Romanized as Tāzehābād; also known as Kanī Golzār, Kānī-ye Golzār, Tāzehābād-e Kānī Golzār, and Tāzehābād-e Qarā Gowl) is a village in Quri Chay Rural District, in the Central District of Dehgolan County, Kurdistan Province, Iran. At the 2006 census, its population was 214, in 46 families. The village is populated by Kurds.
