= Gazgazareh-ye Olya =

Gazgazareh-ye Olya گزگزاره عليا
- Village
- Location within Iran
- Coordinates: 35°11′01″N 47°11′00″E
- Country: Iran
- Province: Kurdistan
- County: Dehgolan
- Bakhsh: Bolbanabad
- Rural District: Sis

Population (2006)
  - Total: 308
- Time zone: UTC+3:30 (IRST)
  - Summer (DST): UTC+4:30 (IRDT)

Gazgazareh-ye Olya (Persian: گزگزاره عليا, also Romanized as Gazgazāreh-ye ‘Olyā; also known as Gar Gezāreh-ye ‘Olyā, Gazgazār-e Bālā, Gaz Gazar-e Bālā, Gazgazāreh Bāla, and Gaz Gezāreh-ye Bālā) is a village in Sis Rural District, Bolbanabad District, Dehgolan County, Kurdistan Province, Iran. At the 2006 census, its population was 308, in 76 families. The village is populated by Kurds.
