= Tazehabad-e Gavmishan =

Tazehabad-e Gavmishan تازه آباد گاوميشان
- Village
- Location within Iran
- Coordinates: 35°23′41″N 47°28′28″E
- Country: Iran
- Province: Kurdistan
- County: Dehgolan
- Bakhsh: Central
- Rural District: Yeylan-e Shomali

Population (2006)
  - Total: 159
- Time zone: UTC+3:30 (IRST)
  - Summer (DST): UTC+4:30 (IRDT)

Tazehabad-e Gavmishan (Persian: تازه آباد گاوميشان, also Romanized as Tāzehābād-e Gāvmīshān; also known as Tāzehābād) is a village in Yeylan-e Shomali Rural District, in the Central District of Dehgolan County, Kurdistan Province, Iran. At the 2006 census, its population was 159, in 36 families. The village is populated by Kurds.
