= Saidabad, Kurdistan =

Saidabad سعيد آباد
- Village
- Location within Iran
- Coordinates: 35°15′19″N 47°25′55″E
- Country: Iran
- Province: Kurdistan
- County: Dehgolan
- Bakhsh: Central
- Rural District: Howmeh-ye Dehgolan

Population (2006)
  - Total: 195
- Time zone: UTC+3:30 (IRST)
  - Summer (DST): UTC+4:30 (IRDT)

Saidabad (Persian: سعيد آباد, also Romanized as Sa‘īdābād; also known as Sā‘edābād) is a village in Howmeh-ye Dehgolan Rural District, in the Central District of Dehgolan County, Kurdistan Province, Iran. At the 2006 census, its population was 195, in 52 families. The village is populated by Kurds.
