= Talvar, Iran =

Talvar or Telvar (Persian: تلوار or طالوار) may refer to:

- Talvar, Hormozgan (طالوار - Ţālvār)
- Talvar, Howmeh, Minab County, Hormozgan Province (تلوار - Talvār)
- Telvar, Kurdistan (تلوار - Telvār)
