= Gheybi Sur =

Gheybi Sur غيبي سور
- Village
- Location within Iran
- Coordinates: 35°50′07″N 47°04′44″E
- Country: Iran
- Province: Kurdistan
- County: Divandarreh
- Bakhsh: Saral
- Rural District: Kowleh

Population (2006)
  - Total: 500
- Time zone: UTC+3:30 (IRST)
  - Summer (DST): UTC+4:30 (IRDT)

Gheybi Sur (Persian: غيبي سور, also Romanized as Gheybī Sūr; also known as Qaishūr and Qeshūr) is a village in Kowleh Rural District, Saral District, Divandarreh County, Kurdistan Province, Iran. At the 2006 census, its population was 500, in 99 families. The village is populated by Kurds.
