= Yeylan =

Yeylan (Persian: ئيلان) may refer to:

- Yeylan-e Jonubi Rural District
- Yeylan-e Shomali Rural District
