= Qeru Chay =

Village in Kurdistan province, Iran

Qeru Chay Persian: قرو چاي
- Village
- Location within Iran Location within Iran Kurdistan
- Coordinates: 35°22′20″N 47°17′57″E
- Country: Iran
- Province: Kurdistan
- County: Dehgolan
- District: Central
- Rural District: Quri Chay

Population (2016)
  - Total: 2,973
- Time zone: UTC+3:30 (IRST)

Qeru Chay (Persian: قرو چاي) (Note: Also romanized as Qerū Chāy; also known as Karreh Chīyeh, Kurreh Chīa, Qūrī Chā’ī, Qūrī Chāy, and Qūrīchā’ī) is a village in, and the capital of, Quri Chay Rural District of the Central District of Dehgolan County, Kurdistan province, Iran.

== Demographics ==
=== Ethnicity ===
The village is populated by Kurds.

=== Population ===
At the time of the 2006 National Census, the village's population was 2,987 in 713 households, when it was in the former Yeylaq District of Qorveh County. The following census in 2011 counted 2,906 people in 842 households, by which time the district had been separated from the county in the establishment of Dehgolan County. The rural district was transferred to the new Central District. The 2016 census measured the population of the village as 2,973 people in 913 households. It was the most populous village in its rural district.
