= Gerd Miran-e Sofla =

Gerd Miran-e Sofla گردميران سفلي
- Village
- Location within Iran
- Coordinates: 35°05′30″N 47°23′31″E
- Country: Iran
- Province: Kurdistan
- County: Dehgolan
- Bakhsh: Bolbanabad
- Rural District: Yeylan-e Jonubi

Population (2006)
  - Total: 1,013
- Time zone: UTC+3:30 (IRST)
  - Summer (DST): UTC+4:30 (IRDT)

Gerd Miran-e Sofla (Persian: گردميران سفلي, also Romanized as Gerd Mīrān-e Soflá; also known as Gerd Mīrān-e Pā’īn and Gird Mirān) is a village in Yeylan-e Jonubi Rural District, Bolbanabad District, Dehgolan County, Kurdistan Province, Iran. At the 2006 census, its population was 1,013, in 219 families. The village is populated by Kurds.
