= Qader Marz, Kurdistan =

Qader Marz قادرمرز
- Village
- Location within Iran
- Coordinates: 35°08′48″N 47°22′20″E
- Country: Iran
- Province: Kurdistan
- County: Dehgolan
- Bakhsh: Bolbanabad
- Rural District: Yeylan-e Jonubi

Population (2006)
  - Total: 390
- Time zone: UTC+3:30 (IRST)
  - Summer (DST): UTC+4:30 (IRDT)

Qader Marz (Persian: قادرمرز, also Romanized as Qāder Marz; also known as Qāder Maz and Qadīr Maz) is a village in Yeylan-e Jonubi Rural District, Bolbanabad District, Dehgolan County, Kurdistan Province, Iran. At the 2006 census, its population was 390, in 93 families. The village is populated by Kurds.
