= Ramol, Iran =

Ramol رامل
- Village
- Location within Iran
- Coordinates: 35°08′43″N 47°13′02″E
- Country: Iran
- Province: Kurdistan
- County: Dehgolan
- Bakhsh: Bolbanabad
- Rural District: Sis

Population (2006)
  - Total: 182
- Time zone: UTC+3:30 (IRST)
  - Summer (DST): UTC+4:30 (IRDT)

Ramol (Persian: رامل, also Romanized as Rāmol; also known as Rāmūl) is a village in Sis Rural District, Bolbanabad District, Dehgolan County, Kurdistan Province, Iran. At the 2006 census, its population was 182, in 49 families. The village is populated by Kurds.
