= Teytaq =

Teytaq طيطاق
- Village
- Location within Iran
- Coordinates: 35°45′20″N 46°58′30″E
- Country: Iran
- Province: Kurdistan
- County: Divandarreh
- Bakhsh: Saral
- Rural District: Kowleh

Population (2006)
  - Total: 148
- Time zone: UTC+3:30 (IRST)
  - Summer (DST): UTC+4:30 (IRDT)

Teytaq (Persian: طيطاق, also Romanized as Ţeyţāq; also known as Teyţakh) is a village in Kowleh Rural District, Saral District, Divandarreh County, Kurdistan Province, Iran. At the 2006 census, its population was 148, in 31 families. The village is populated by Kurds.
