= Asiab Jub, Kurdistan =

Asiab Jub آسياب جوب
- Village
- Location within Iran
- Coordinates: 35°19′04″N 47°30′39″E
- Country: Iran
- Province: Kurdistan
- County: Dehgolan
- Bakhsh: Central
- Rural District: Howmeh-ye Dehgolan

Population (2006)
  - Total: 121
- Time zone: UTC+3:30 (IRST)
  - Summer (DST): UTC+4:30 (IRDT)

Asiab Jub (Persian: آسياب جوب, also Romanized as Āsīāb Jūb; also known as Āseyab Jū, Ashiābju, and Eshābjū) is a village in Howmeh-ye Dehgolan Rural District, in the Central District of Dehgolan County, Kurdistan Province, Iran. At the 2006 census, its population was 121, in 26 families. The village is populated by Kurds.
