= Gelah Sur =

Gelah Sur گله سور
- Village
- Location within Iran
- Coordinates: 35°52′19″N 46°54′07″E
- Country: Iran
- Province: Kurdistan
- County: Divandarreh
- Bakhsh: Saral
- Rural District: Saral

Population (2006)
  - Total: 250
- Time zone: UTC+3:30 (IRST)
  - Summer (DST): UTC+4:30 (IRDT)

Gelah Sur (Persian: گله سور, also Romanized as Gelah Sūr, Galehsūr, and Geleh Sūr) is a village in Saral Rural District, Saral District, Divandarreh County, Kurdistan Province, Iran. At the 2006 census, its population was 250, in 50 families. The village is populated by Kurds.
