= Sarab-e Shahrak-e Olya =

Sarab-e Shahrak-e Olya سراب شهرك عليا
- Village
- Location within Iran
- Coordinates: 35°37′26″N 47°21′39″E
- Country: Iran
- Province: Kurdistan
- County: Dehgolan
- Bakhsh: Central
- Rural District: Yeylan-e Shomali

Population (2006)
  - Total: 307
- Time zone: UTC+3:30 (IRST)
  - Summer (DST): UTC+4:30 (IRDT)

Sarab-e Shahrak-e Olya (Persian: سراب شهرك عليا, also Romanized as Sarāb-e Shahrak-e ‘Olyā; also known as Charīkeh-ye Bālā, Sarāb-e Shahrak, Sarāb Shahrak, Shahrak-e Bālā, Shahrak-e ‘Olyā, Sharak-e Bālā, Sharīkeh Bāla, and Sharīkeh-ye Bālā) is a village in Yeylan-e Shomali Rural District, in the Central District of Dehgolan County, Kurdistan Province, Iran. At the 2006 census, its population was 307, in 65 families. The village is populated by Kurds.
