= Bashmaq, Dehgolan =

Bashmaq باشماق
- Village
- Location within Iran
- Coordinates: 35°11′12″N 47°24′22″E
- Country: Iran
- Province: Kurdistan
- County: Dehgolan
- Bakhsh: Bolbanabad
- Rural District: Yeylan-e Jonubi

Population (2006)
  - Total: 1,541
- Time zone: UTC+3:30 (IRST)
  - Summer (DST): UTC+4:30 (IRDT)

Bashmaq (Persian: باشماق, also Romanized as Bāshmāq) is a village in Yeylan-e Jonubi Rural District, Bolbanabad District, Dehgolan County, Kurdistan Province, Iran. At the 2006 census, its population was 1,541, in 344 families. The village is populated by Kurds.
