= Allah Darreh =

Allah Darreh or Aleh Darreh or Aleh Derreh (Persian: اله دره), also rendered as Hala Darreh and Haleh Darreh, may refer to:

- Allah Darreh-ye Olya
- Allah Darreh-ye Sofla
