= Gazgazareh-ye Sofla =

Gazgazareh-ye Sofla گزگزاره سفلي
- Village
- Location within Iran
- Coordinates: 35°10′02″N 47°11′37″E
- Country: Iran
- Province: Kurdistan
- County: Dehgolan
- Bakhsh: Bolbanabad
- Rural District: Sis

Population (2006)
  - Total: 243
- Time zone: UTC+3:30 (IRST)
  - Summer (DST): UTC+4:30 (IRDT)

Gazgazareh-ye Sofla (Persian: گزگزاره سفلي, also Romanized as Gazgazāreh-ye Soflá and Gaz Gezāreh-ye Soflá; also known as Gazgazāreh Pāin, Gazgazār-e Pā’īn, Gaz Gazār-e Pā’īn, Gaz Gezareh Pā’īn, and Gaz Gezāreh-ye Pā’īn) is a village in Sis Rural District, Bolbanabad District, Dehgolan County, Kurdistan Province, Iran. At the 2006 census, its population was 243, in 63 families. The village is populated by Kurds.
