= Zagheh-ye Olya =

Zagheh-ye Olya زاغه عليا
- Village
- Location within Iran
- Coordinates: 35°45′23″N 47°06′27″E
- Country: Iran
- Province: Kurdistan
- County: Divandarreh
- Bakhsh: Saral
- Rural District: Kowleh

Population (2006)
  - Total: 496
- Time zone: UTC+3:30 (IRST)
  - Summer (DST): UTC+4:30 (IRDT)

Zagheh-ye Olya (Persian: زاغه عليا, also Romanized as Zāgheh-ye ‘Olyā; also known as Zāgheh and Zāgheh-ye Bālā) is a village in Kowleh Rural District, Saral District, Divandarreh County, Kurdistan Province, Iran. At the 2006 census, its population was 496, in 123 families. The village is populated by Kurds.
