= Tazehabad-e Amin =

Tazehabad-e Amin (Persian: تازه ابادامين) may refer to:

- Tazehabad-e Amin, Kermanshah
- Tazehabad-e Amin, Kurdistan
