= Tazehabad-e Qazi Ali =

Tazehabad-e Qazi Ali تازه آباد قاضي علي
- Village
- Location within Iran
- Coordinates: 35°36′50″N 46°42′53″E
- Country: Iran
- Province: Kurdistan
- County: Divandarreh
- Bakhsh: Saral
- Rural District: Saral

Population (2006)
  - Total: 87
- Time zone: UTC+3:30 (IRST)
  - Summer (DST): UTC+4:30 (IRDT)

Tazehabad-e Qazi Ali (Persian: تازه آباد قاضي علي, also Romanized as Tāzehābād-e Qāẕī ‘Alī and Tāzehābād Qāẕī ‘Alī; also known as Tāzehābād-e Qāzī) is a village in Saral Rural District, Saral District, Divandarreh County, Kurdistan Province, Iran. At the 2006 census, its population was 87, in 16 families.
