= Allah Darreh-ye Sofla =

Village in Kurdistan, Iran

Allah Darreh-ye Sofla اله دره سفلي
- Village
- Location within Iran
- Coordinates: 35°42′00″N 47°00′53″E
- Country: Iran
- Province: Kurdistan
- County: Divandarreh
- Bakhsh: Saral
- Rural District: Kowleh

Population (2006)
  - Total: 464
- Time zone: UTC+3:30 (IRST)
  - Summer (DST): UTC+4:30 (IRDT)

Allah Darreh-ye Sofla (Persian: اله دره سفلي, also Romanized as Allāh Darreh-ye Soflá and Āleh Darreh-ye Soflá; also known as Āleh Derreh-ye Pā’īn, Allāh Darreh, Allāh Darreh-ye Pā’īn, Halagara Pain, Hald-i-Rāh, and Hāleh Darreh-ye Pā’īn) is a village in Kowleh Rural District, Saral District, Divandarreh County, Kurdistan Province, Iran. At the 2006 census, its population was 464, in 93 families. The village is populated by Kurds.
