= Sebis =

Sebis may refer to:

- Sebis, Iran
- Sebiș, Romania
