= Tazehabad Duleh Rash =

Tazehabad Duleh Rash تازه آباد دوله رش
- Village
- Location within Iran
- Coordinates: 35°39′37″N 46°49′11″E
- Country: Iran
- Province: Kurdistan
- County: Divandarreh
- Bakhsh: Saral
- Rural District: Saral

Population (2006)
  - Total: 145
- Time zone: UTC+3:30 (IRST)
  - Summer (DST): UTC+4:30 (IRDT)

Tazehabad Duleh Rash (Persian: تازه آباد دوله رش, also Romanized as Tāzehābād Dūleh Rash) is a village in Saral Rural District, Saral District, Divandarreh County, Kurdistan Province, Iran. At the 2006 census, its population was 145, in 23 families. The village is populated by Kurds.
