= Eslamabad, Divandarreh =

Eslamabad اسلام آباد
- Village
- Location within Iran
- Coordinates: 35°48′07″N 46°54′53″E
- Country: Iran
- Province: Kurdistan
- County: Divandarreh
- Bakhsh: Saral
- Rural District: Saral

Population (2006)
  - Total: 82
- Time zone: UTC+3:30 (IRST)
  - Summer (DST): UTC+4:30 (IRDT)

Eslamabad (Persian: اسلام آباد, also Romanized as Eslāmābād; also known as Eslāmābād-e Ḩājjī Mūsá and Tāzeh Deh-e Eslāmābād) is a village in Saral Rural District, Saral District, Divandarreh County, Kurdistan Province, Iran. At the 2006 census, its population was 82, in 21 families. The village is populated by Kurds.
