= Gizmel-e Sofla =

Gizmel-e Sofla گيزمل سفلي
- Village
- Location within Iran
- Coordinates: 35°42′20″N 46°47′20″E
- Country: Iran
- Province: Kurdistan
- County: Divandarreh
- Bakhsh: Saral
- Rural District: Saral

Population (2006)
  - Total: 285
- Time zone: UTC+3:30 (IRST)
  - Summer (DST): UTC+4:30 (IRDT)

Gizmel-e Sofla (Persian: گيزمل سفلي, also Romanized as Gīzmel-e Soflá and Gīzmal Sofla; also known as Gezmel-e Soflá, Gīzmel-e Pā’īn, and Kīzmel-e Soflá) is a village in Saral Rural District, Saral District, Divandarreh County, Kurdistan Province, Iran. At the 2006 census, its population was 285, in 52 families. The village is populated by Kurds.
