= Zagheh-ye Sofla =

Zagheh-ye Sofla زاغه سفلي
- Village
- Location within Iran
- Coordinates: 35°45′45″N 47°05′01″E
- Country: Iran
- Province: Kurdistan
- County: Divandarreh
- Bakhsh: Saral
- Rural District: Kowleh

Population (2006)
  - Total: 459
- Time zone: UTC+3:30 (IRST)
  - Summer (DST): UTC+4:30 (IRDT)

Zagheh-ye Sofla (Persian: زاغه سفلي, also Romanized as Zāgheh-ye Soflá; also known as Zāgheh and Zāgheh-ye Pā’īn) is a village in Kowleh Rural District, Saral District, Divandarreh County, Kurdistan Province, Iran. At the 2006 census, its population was 459, in 111 families. The village is populated by Kurds.
