= Kowleh =

Village in Kurdistan province, Iran

Kowleh Persian: كوله
- Village
- Location within Iran Location within Iran Kurdistan
- Coordinates: 35°47′23″N 47°03′10″E
- Country: Iran
- Province: Kurdistan
- County: Divandarreh
- District: Saral
- Rural District: Kowleh

Population (2016)
  - Total: 309
- Time zone: UTC+3:30 (IRST)

Kowleh (Persian: كوله) (Note: Also romanized as Kaūleh, Kooleh, and Kūleh; also known as Qaula) is a village in, and the capital of, Kowleh Rural District of Saral District, Divandarreh County, Kurdistan province, Iran.

== Demographics ==
=== Ethnicity ===
The village is populated by Kurds.

=== Population ===
At the time of the 2006 National Census, the village's population was 309 in 76 households. The following census in 2011 counted 373 people in 80 households. The 2016 census measured the population of the village as 309 people in 74 households.
