= Allah Darreh-ye Olya =

Allah Darreh-ye Olya اله دره عليا
- Village
- Location within Iran
- Coordinates: 35°46′00″N 46°58′00″E
- Country: Iran
- Province: Kurdistan
- County: Divandarreh
- Bakhsh: Saral
- Rural District: Kowleh

Population (2006)
  - Total: 344
- Time zone: UTC+3:30 (IRST)
  - Summer (DST): UTC+4:30 (IRDT)

Allah Darreh-ye Olya (Persian: اله دره عليا, also Romanized as Allāh Darreh-ye ‘Olyā; also known as Ālah Darreh-ye Balā, Āleh Darreh Bālā, Allāh Darreh-ye Bālā, Hala Darreh, Ḩaleh Darreh, and Hāleh Darreh-ye Olyā) is a village in Kowleh Rural District, Saral District, Divandarreh County, Kurdistan Province, Iran. At the 2006 census, its population was 344, in 69 families. The village is populated by Kurds.
