= Qojur =

Qojur (Persian: قجور) may refer to:

- Qojur, Kurdistan
- Qojur, Divandarreh, Kurdistan Province
- Qojur, West Azerbaijan
- Qojur, Zanjan
