= Qojer =

Qojer قجر
- Village
- Location within Iran
- Coordinates: 35°44′47″N 47°01′45″E
- Country: Iran
- Province: Kurdistan
- County: Divandarreh
- Bakhsh: Saral
- Rural District: Kowleh

Population (2006)
  - Total: 708
- Time zone: UTC+3:30 (IRST)
  - Summer (DST): UTC+4:30 (IRDT)

Qojer (Persian: قجر, also Romanized as Qojar; also known as Khojar, Qojūr, and Qūjer) is a village in Kowleh Rural District, Saral District, Divandarreh County, Kurdistan Province, Iran. At the 2006 census, its population was 708, in 144 families. The village is populated by Kurds.
