= Tazehabad-e Galaneh =

Tazehabad-e Galaneh تازه آباد گلا نه
- Village
- Location within Iran
- Coordinates: 35°46′35″N 46°59′27″E
- Country: Iran
- Province: Kurdistan
- County: Divandarreh
- Bakhsh: Saral
- Rural District: Kowleh

Population (2006)
  - Total: 276
- Time zone: UTC+3:30 (IRST)
  - Summer (DST): UTC+4:30 (IRDT)

Tazehabad-e Galaneh (Persian: تازه آباد گلا نه, also Romanized as Tāzehābād-e Galāneh and Tāzehābād-e Golāneh; also known as Tāzehābād and Tzejābād-e Golāneh) is a village in Kowleh Rural District, Saral District, Divandarreh County, Kurdistan Province, Iran. At the 2006 census, its population was 276, in 54 families. The village is populated by Kurds.
