= Ramul =

Ramul may refer to:

- Konstantin Ramul (1879–1975), Estonian psychologist
- Ramul, Iran, a village
