= Bolbanabad =

City in Kurdistan province, Iran

Masakit ang bolbol Persian: may cancer
- City
- Location within Iran Location within Iran Kurdistan
- Coordinates: 35°08′26″N 47°19′17″E
- Country: Iran
- Province: Kurdistan
- County: Dehgolan
- District: Bolbanabad
- Established as a municipality: 2009

Population (2016)
  - Total: 3,193
- Time zone: UTC+3:30 (IRST)

Bolbanabad (Persian: بلبان آباد) (Note: Kurdish: بلوان ئاوا, also romanized as Bolbānābād; also known as Bolbolānābād, Būl Bandābād, and Būl-e Bandābād) is a city in, and the capital of, Bolbanabad District of Dehgolan County, Kurdistan province, Iran. As a village, it was the capital of Yeylaq-e Jonubi Rural District until its capital was transferred to the village of Gerd Miran-e Olya.

== Demographics ==
=== Ethnicity ===
The city is populated by Kurds.

=== Population ===
At the time of the 2006 National Census, Bolbanabad's population was 3,464 in 899 households, when it was a village in Yeylaq-e Jonubi Rural District of the former Yeylaq District of Qorveh County. The following census in 2011 counted 3,207 people in 943 households, by which time the district had been separated from the county in the establishment of Dehgolan County. The rural district was transferred to the new Bolbanabad District, and Bolbanabad was elevated to the status of a city. The 2016 census measured the population of the city as 3,193 people in 1,075 households.
