= Qeshm (disambiguation) =

Qeshm is an island in the Persian Gulf.

Qeshm (Persian: قشم) may also refer to:

- Qeshm, Hormozgan, a city on the island
- Qeshm, Kurdistan, a village in Kurdistan Province
- Qeshm County, an administrative subdivision of Iran
- Qeshm Air
- Qeshm Airport
- Qeshm Institute of Higher Education
