= Shahrak-e Bala =

Shahrak-e Bala (Persian: شهرك بالا) may refer to:

- Shahrak-e Bala, East Azerbaijan
- Shahrak-e Bala, Kurdistan
