= Golaneh =

Village in Kurdistan province, Iran

Golaneh Persian: گلا نه
- Village
- Location within Iran Location within Iran Kurdistan
- Coordinates: 35°49′31″N 46°59′12″E
- Country: Iran
- Province: Kurdistan
- County: Divandarreh
- District: Saral
- Rural District: Kowleh

Population (2016)
  - Total: 618
- Time zone: UTC+3:30 (IRST)

Golaneh (Persian: گلا نه) (Note: Also romanized as Galāneh and Golāneh) is a village in Kowleh Rural District of Saral District, Divandarreh County, Kurdistan province, Iran.

== Demographics ==
=== Ethnicity ===
The village is populated by Kurds.

=== Population ===
At the time of the 2006 National Census, the village's population was 921 in 158 households. The following census in 2011 counted 703 people in 160 households. The 2016 census measured the population of the village as 618 people in 140 households. It was the most populous village in its rural district.
