= Gizmel-e Olya =

Village in Kurdistan Province, Iran

Gizmel-e Olya گيزمل عليا
- Village
- Location within Iran
- Coordinates: 35°42′06″N 46°47′31″E
- Country: Iran
- Province: Kurdistan
- County: Divandarreh
- Bakhsh: Saral
- Rural District: Saral

Population (2006)
  - Total: 237
- Time zone: UTC+3:30 (IRST)
  - Summer (DST): UTC+4:30 (IRDT)

Gizmel-e Olya (Persian: گيزمل عليا, also Romanized as Gīzmel-e ‘Olyā and Gīzmal-e Olya; also known as Gazmel-e ‘Olyā, Gezmel, Gezmel-e ‘Olyā, Gezmīl, Gezmil-e Bālā, Gīzmel-e Bālā, Gizmil, and Kīzmel-e ‘Olyā) is a village in Saral Rural District, Saral District, Divandarreh County, Kurdistan Province, Iran. At the 2006 census, its population was 237, in 47 families. The village is populated by Kurds.
