= Tazehabad-e Asef =

Tazehabad-e Asef تازه آباد آصف
- Village
- Location within Iran
- Coordinates: 35°46′16″N 46°55′35″E
- Country: Iran
- Province: Kurdistan
- County: Divandarreh
- Bakhsh: Saral
- Rural District: Saral

Population (2006)
  - Total: 238
- Time zone: UTC+3:30 (IRST)
  - Summer (DST): UTC+4:30 (IRDT)

Tazehabad-e Asef (Persian: تازه آباد آصف, also Romanized as Tāzehābād-e Āşef) is a village in Saral Rural District, Saral District, Divandarreh County, Kurdistan Province, Iran. At the 2006 census, its population was 238, in 47 families. The village is populated by Kurds.
