= Hezar Kanian =

City in Kurdistan province, Iran

Hezar Kanian Persian: هزاركانيان
- City
- Location within Iran Location within Iran Kurdistan
- Coordinates: 35°46′05″N 46°48′42″E
- Country: Iran
- Province: Kurdistan
- County: Divandarreh
- District: Saral

Population (2016)
  - Total: 544
- Time zone: UTC+3:30 (IRST)

Hezar Kanian (Persian: هزاركانيان) (Note: Also romanized as Hezār Kānīān) is a city in, and the capital of, Saral District of Divandarreh County, Kurdistan province, Iran. It also serves as the administrative center for Saral Rural District.

== Demographics ==
=== Ethnicity ===
The city is populated by Kurds.

=== Population ===
At the time of the 2006 National Census, Hezar Kanian's population was 511 in 109 households, when it was a village in Saral Rural District. The following census in 2011 counted 773 people in 156 households. The 2016 census measured the population of the village as 544 people in 115 households. It was the most populous village in its rural district.

After the census, the village of Hezar Kanian was elevated to the status of a city.

== Overview ==
It has rapid growth in the main areas of agriculture. The location of the new city of Hezar Kanian can be explained and analyzed in many points: access location, geomorphological construction, economic foundations and population strategies, are more effective for the development of such settlements, which if the right policies are adopted, will cause the physical development of this new city. It is emphasized again that it is necessary to provide the ground for the sustainability of the population with a new functional definition and diversification of the urban economy.
