= Tazehabad-e Bozon Qaran =

Tazehabad-e Bozon Qaran تازه آباد بزن قران
- Village
- Location within Iran
- Coordinates: 35°38′07″N 47°08′23″E
- Country: Iran
- Province: Kurdistan
- County: Divandarreh
- Bakhsh: Saral
- Rural District: Hoseynabad-e Shomali

Population (2006)
  - Total: 365
- Time zone: UTC+3:30 (IRST)
  - Summer (DST): UTC+4:30 (IRDT)

Tazehabad-e Bozon Qaran (Persian: تازه آباد بزن قران, also Romanized as Tāzehābād-e Bozon Qarān, Tāzehābād-e Bezenqerān, and Tāzehābād-e Bozonqarān; also known as Tāzehābād) is a village in Hoseynabad-e Shomali Rural District, Saral District, Divandarreh County, Kurdistan Province, Iran. At the 2006 census, its population was 365, in 75 families. The village is populated by Kurds.
