= Zagheh-ye Akbarabad =

Zagheh-ye Akbarabad زاغه اكبراباد
- Village
- Location within Iran
- Coordinates: 33°45′55″N 49°00′59″E
- Country: Iran
- Province: Markazi
- County: Shazand
- Bakhsh: Sarband
- Rural District: Malmir

Population (2006)
  - Total: 104
- Time zone: UTC+3:30 (IRST)
  - Summer (DST): UTC+4:30 (IRDT)

Zagheh-ye Akbarabad (Persian: زاغه اكبراباد, also Romanized as Zāgheh-ye Akbarābād; also known as Zāgheh) is a village in Malmir Rural District, Sarband District, Shazand County, Markazi Province, Iran. At the 2006 census, its population was 104, in 23 families.
