= Tazehabad, Bijar =

Village in Kurdistan, Iran

Tazehabad تازه آباد
- Village
- Location within Iran
- Coordinates: 35°58′03″N 47°54′26″E
- Country: Iran
- Province: Kurdistan
- County: Bijar
- Bakhsh: Central
- Rural District: Khvor Khvoreh

Population (2006)
  - Total: 158
- Time zone: UTC+3:30 (IRST)
  - Summer (DST): UTC+4:30 (IRDT)

Tazehabad (Persian: تازه آباد, also Romanized as Tāzehābād; also known as Tāzehābād-e Pīr Tāj and Tāzehābād-e Qarālchūq) is a village in Khvor Khvoreh Rural District, in the Central District of Bijar County, Kurdistan Province, Iran. At the 2006 census, its population was 158, in 29 families. The village is populated by Azerbaijanis.
