= Tazehabad-e Isaabad =

Tazehabad-e Isaabad تازه آباد عيسي آباد
- Village
- Location within Iran
- Coordinates: 35°21′44″N 46°47′59″E
- Country: Iran
- Province: Kurdistan
- County: Sanandaj
- Bakhsh: Kalatrazan
- Rural District: Kalatrazan

Population (2006)
  - Total: 334
- Time zone: UTC+3:30 (IRST)
  - Summer (DST): UTC+4:30 (IRDT)

Tazehabad-e Isaabad (Persian: تازه آباد عيسي آباد, also Romanized as Tāzehābād-e ‘Īsáābād) is a village in Kalatrazan Rural District, Kalatrazan District, Sanandaj County, Kurdistan Province, Iran. At the 2006 census, its population was 334, in 82 families. The village is populated by Kurds.
