= Talvar, Hormozgan =

Talvar طالوار
- Village
- Location within Iran
- Coordinates: 26°57′11″N 57°07′02″E
- Country: Iran
- Province: Hormozgan
- County: Minab
- Bakhsh: Central
- Rural District: Band-e Zarak

Population (2006)
  - Total: 271
- Time zone: UTC+3:30 (IRST)
  - Summer (DST): UTC+4:30 (IRDT)

Talvar (Persian: طالوار, also Romanized as Ţālvār, Tālevār, and Tālvār) is a village in Band-e Zarak Rural District, in the Central District of Minab County, Hormozgan Province, Iran. At the 2006 census, its population was 271, in 49 families.
