= Tazehabad, Saqqez =

Tazehabad تازه‌آباد
- Village
- Location within Iran
- Coordinates: 36°04′07″N 46°45′11″E
- Country: Iran
- Province: Kurdistan
- County: Saqqez
- Bakhsh: Ziviyeh
- Rural District: Tilakuh

Population (2006)
  - Total: 233
- Time zone: UTC+3:30 (IRST)
  - Summer (DST): UTC+4:30 (IRDT)

Tazehabad (Persian: تازه‌آباد, also Romanized as Tāzehābād) is a village in Tilakuh Rural District, Ziviyeh District, Saqqez County, Kurdistan Province, Iran. At the 2006 census, its population was 233, in 42 families. The village is populated by Kurds.
