= Quri Chay, Baneh =

Quri Chay قوري چاي
- Village
- Location within Iran
- Coordinates: 36°02′56″N 45°57′36″E
- Country: Iran
- Province: Kurdistan
- County: Baneh
- Bakhsh: Central
- Rural District: Shuy

Population (2006)
  - Total: 67
- Time zone: UTC+3:30 (IRST)
  - Summer (DST): UTC+4:30 (IRDT)

Quri Chay (Persian: قوري چاي, also Romanized as Qurī Chāy) is a village in Shuy Rural District, in the Central District of Baneh County, Kurdistan Province, Iran. At the 2006 census, its population was 67, in 15 families. The village is populated by Kurds.
