= Zagheh-ye Bozorg-e Qaleh-ye Ranjbar =

Village in Kermanshah, Iran

Zagheh-ye Bozorg-e Qaleh-ye Ranjbar زاغه بزرگ قلعه رنجبر
- Village
- Location within Iran
- Coordinates: 34°38′29″N 46°15′11″E
- Country: Iran
- Province: Kermanshah
- County: Dalahu
- Bakhsh: Gahvareh
- Rural District: Qalkhani

Population (2006)
  - Total: 167
- Time zone: UTC+3:30 (IRST)
  - Summer (DST): UTC+4:30 (IRDT)

Zagheh-ye Bozorg-e Qaleh-ye Ranjbar (Persian: زاغه بزرگ قلعه رنجبر, also Romanized as Zāgheh-ye Bozorg-e Qal‘eh-ye Ranjbar; also known as Zāgheh) is a village in Qalkhani Rural District, Gahvareh District, Dalahu County, Kermanshah Province, Iran. At the 2006 census, its population was 167, in 32 families.
