= Tazehabad, Kelachay =

Village in Gilan, Iran

Tazehabad تازه اباد
- Village
- Location within Iran
- Coordinates: 37°03′07″N 50°21′18″E
- Country: Iran
- Province: Gilan
- County: Rudsar
- Bakhsh: Kelachay
- Rural District: Bibalan

Population (2006)
  - Total: 422
- Time zone: UTC+3:30 (IRST)
  - Summer (DST): UTC+4:30 (IRDT)

Tazehabad (Persian: تازه اباد, also Romanized as Tāzehābād; also known as Tāzābād-e Jangāh and Tāzehābād-e Jangāh) is a village in Bibalan Rural District, Kelachay District, Rudsar County, Gilan Province, Iran. At the 2006 census, its population was 422, in 115 families.
