= Zagheh, Dorud =

Zagheh زاغه
- Village
- Location within Iran
- Coordinates: 33°35′43″N 49°11′38″E
- Country: Iran
- Province: Lorestan
- County: Dorud
- Bakhsh: Central
- Rural District: Zhan

Population (2006)
  - Total: 72
- Time zone: UTC+3:30 (IRST)
  - Summer (DST): UTC+4:30 (IRDT)

Zagheh (Persian: زاغه, also Romanized as Zāgheh; also known as Zāgheh-ye ‘Olyā, Z̄āgheh Chūbdar, and Zāgheh-ye Bālā) is a village in Zhan Rural District, in the Central District of Dorud County, Lorestan Province, Iran. At the 2006 census, its population was 72, in 14 families.
