= Tazehabad-e Chomaqestan =

Tazehabad-e Chomaqestan تازه ابادچماقستان
- Village
- Location within Iran
- Coordinates: 37°07′18″N 50°12′31″E
- Country: Iran
- Province: Gilan
- County: Amlash
- Bakhsh: Central
- Rural District: Amlash-e Shomali

Population (2006)
  - Total: 73
- Time zone: UTC+3:30 (IRST)
  - Summer (DST): UTC+4:30 (IRDT)

Tazehabad-e Chomaqestan (Persian: تازه ابادچماقستان, also Romanized as Tāzehābād-e Chomāqestān; also known as Tāzehābād-e Soflá) is a village in Amlash-e Shomali Rural District, in the Central District of Amlash County, Gilan Province, Iran. At the 2006 census, its population was 73, in 21 families.
