= Tazehabad-e Labagh =

Tazehabad-e Labagh تازه اباد لاباغ
- Village
- Location within Iran
- Coordinates: 34°43′19″N 46°25′23″E
- Country: Iran
- Province: Kermanshah
- County: Javanrud
- Bakhsh: Central
- Rural District: Bazan

Population (2006)
  - Total: 61
- Time zone: UTC+3:30 (IRST)
  - Summer (DST): UTC+4:30 (IRDT)

Tazehabad-e Labagh (Persian: تازه اباد لاباغ, also Romanized as Tāzehābād-e Lābāgh; also known as Lābāgh) is a village in Bazan Rural District, in the Central District of Javanrud County, Kermanshah Province, Iran. At the 2006 census, its population was 61, in 13 families.
