= Tazehabad-e Amaleh =

Village in Kermanshah province, Iran

Tazehabad-e Amaleh Persian: تازه ابادعمله
- Village
- Location within Iran
- Coordinates: 34°29′53″N 47°02′35″E
- Country: Iran
- Province: Kermanshah
- County: Kermanshah
- District: Central
- Rural District: Miyan Darband

Population (2016)
  - Total: 236
- Time zone: UTC+3:30 (IRST)

Tazehabad-e Amaleh (Persian: تازه ابادعمله) (Note: Also romanized as Tāzehābād-e ‘Amaleh; also known as Tāzehābād) is a village in Miyan Darband Rural District of the Central District of Kermanshah County, Kermanshah province, Iran.

== Demographics ==
=== Population ===
At the time of the 2006 National Census, the village's population was 287 in 66 households. The following census in 2011 counted 236 people in 64 households. The 2016 census measured the population of the village as 236 people in 70 households.
