= Tazehabad, Rahimabad =

Village in Gilan, Iran

Tazehabad تازه اباد
- Village
- Location within Iran
- Coordinates: 36°47′03″N 50°14′03″E
- Country: Iran
- Province: Gilan
- County: Rudsar
- Bakhsh: Rahimabad
- Rural District: Shuil

Population (2006)
  - Total: 41
- Time zone: UTC+3:30 (IRST)
  - Summer (DST): UTC+4:30 (IRDT)

Tazehabad (Persian: تازه اباد, also Romanized as Tāzehābād) is a village in Shuil Rural District, Rahimabad District, Rudsar County, Gilan Province, Iran. At the 2006 census, its population was 41, in 7 families.
