= Tazehabad-e Sarab-e Qaht =

Tazehabad-e Sarab-e Qaht تازه آباد سراب قحط
- Village
- Location within Iran
- Coordinates: 35°10′47″N 47°33′52″E
- Country: Iran
- Province: Kurdistan
- County: Qorveh
- Bakhsh: Central
- Rural District: Panjeh Ali

Population (2006)
  - Total: 56
- Time zone: UTC+3:30 (IRST)
  - Summer (DST): UTC+4:30 (IRDT)

Tazehabad-e Sarab-e Qaht (Persian: تازه آباد سراب قحط, also Romanized as Tāzehābād-e Sarāb-e Qaḩţ and Tāzehābād-e Sar Āb Qaḩţ; also known as Tāzeh Āveh and Tāzehāwa) is a village in Panjeh Ali Rural District, in the Central District of Qorveh County, Kurdistan Province, Iran. At the 2006 census, its population was 56, in 15 families. The village is populated by Kurds.
