= Tazehabad-e Kukav =

Tazehabad-e Kukav تازه ابادكوكاو
- Village
- Location within Iran
- Coordinates: 33°58′12″N 46°35′04″E
- Country: Iran
- Province: Kermanshah
- County: Eslamabad-e Gharb
- Bakhsh: Central
- Rural District: Howmeh-ye Jonubi

Population (2006)
  - Total: 44
- Time zone: UTC+3:30 (IRST)
  - Summer (DST): UTC+4:30 (IRDT)

Tazehabad-e Kukav (Persian: تازه ابادكوكاو, also Romanized as Tāzehābād-e Kūkāv; also known as Tāzehābād) is a village in Howmeh-ye Jonubi Rural District, in the Central District of Eslamabad-e Gharb County, Kermanshah Province, Iran. At the 2006 census, its population was 44, in 9 families.
