= Qader Marz, Kermanshah =

Qader Marz قادرمرز
- Village
- Location within Iran
- Coordinates: 34°00′14″N 47°12′10″E
- Country: Iran
- Province: Kermanshah
- County: Kermanshah
- Bakhsh: Firuzabad
- Rural District: Osmanvand

Population (2006)
  - Total: 45
- Time zone: UTC+3:30 (IRST)
  - Summer (DST): UTC+4:30 (IRDT)

Qader Marz (Persian: قادرمرز, also Romanized as Qāder Marz; also known as Qāder Maz, Qāder Mazd, and Qādir Maz) is a village in Osmanvand Rural District, Firuzabad District, Kermanshah County, Kermanshah Province, Iran. At the 2006 census, its population was 45, in 10 families.
