= Tazehabad-e Bati =

Tazehabad-e Bati تازه ابادبطي
- Village
- Location within Iran
- Coordinates: 34°02′31″N 46°07′15″E
- Country: Iran
- Province: Kermanshah
- County: Gilan-e Gharb
- Bakhsh: Central
- Rural District: Cheleh

Population (2006)
  - Total: 295
- Time zone: UTC+3:30 (IRST)
  - Summer (DST): UTC+4:30 (IRDT)

Tazehabad-e Bati (Persian: تازه ابادبطي, also Romanized as Tāzehābād-e Baţī and Tāzehābād Baţī) is a village in Cheleh Rural District, in the Central District of Gilan-e Gharb County, Kermanshah Province, Iran. According to the 2006 census, its population was 295, in 66 families.
