= Tazehabad-e Melleh Tarshi =

Tazehabad-e Melleh Tarshi تازه‌آباد مله‌ترشی
- Village
- Country: Iran
- Province: Kermanshah
- County: Ravansar
- Bakhsh: Central
- Rural District: Dowlatabad

Population (2006)
  - Total: 65
- Time zone: UTC+3:30 (IRST)
  - Summer (DST): UTC+4:30 (IRDT)

Tazehabad-e Melleh Tarshi (Persian: تازه‌آباد مله‌ترشی, also Romanized as Tāzehābād-e Mellleh Tarshī) is a village in Dowlatabad Rural District, in the Central District of Ravansar County, Kermanshah Province, Iran. At the 2006 census, its population was 65, in 15 families.
