= Dehgolan =

City in Kurdistan province, Iran

Dehgolan Persian: دهگلان Kurdish: دێولان
- City
- Location within Iran Location within Iran Kurdistan
- Coordinates: 35°16′40″N 47°25′03″E
- Country: Iran
- Province: Kurdistan
- County: Dehgolan
- District: Central

Population (2016)
  - Total: 25,992
- Time zone: UTC+3:30 (IRST)
- Area code: +98873512
- Website: dehgolan.com

Dehgolan (Persian: دهگلان) (Note: Kurdish: دێولان, also romanized as Dehgolān; also known as Deolan and Dewlan) is a city in the Central District of Dehgolan County, Kurdistan province, Iran, serving as capital of both the county and the district.

Dehgolan is bordered by Bijar and Divandarreh to the north, Qorveh to the east, Kamyaran and Songhor to the south and Sanandaj to the west.

== Demographics ==
=== Ethnicity ===
The city is populated by Kurds.

=== Language ===
The inhabitants of Dehgolan are Kurdish-speaking and speak the Central Kurdish dialect, specifically the Ardalani branch of the Kurdish language.

=== Population ===
At the time of the 2006 National Census, the city's population was 20,226 in 4,920 households, when it was in the former Yeylaq District of Qorveh County. The following census in 2011 counted 23,074 people in 6,271 households, by which time the district had been separated from the county in the establishment of Dehgolan County. Dehgolan was transferred to the new Central District as the county's capital. The 2016 census measured the population of the city as 25,992 people in 7,708 households.

== Climate ==
The city of Dehgolan has very cold winters and pleasant, mild summers.
