= Asiab Jub-e Farmanfarma =

Asiab Jub-e Farmanfarma اسياب جوب فرمانفرما
- Village
- Location within Iran
- Coordinates: 34°58′43″N 47°34′05″E
- Country: Iran
- Province: Kermanshah
- County: Sonqor
- Bakhsh: Central
- Rural District: Gavrud

Population (2006)
  - Total: 145
- Time zone: UTC+3:30 (IRST)
  - Summer (DST): UTC+4:30 (IRDT)

Asiab Jub-e Farmanfarma (Persian: اسياب جوب فرمانفرما, also Romanized as Āsīāb Jūb-e Farmānfarmā; also known as Jūb-e Farmānfarmā) is a village in Gavrud Rural District, in the Central District of Sonqor County, Kermanshah Province, Iran. At the 2006 census, its population was 145, in 32 families.
