= Tazehabad-e Nazliyan =

Tazehabad-e Nazliyan تازه ابادنازليان
- Village
- Country: Iran
- Province: Kermanshah
- County: Harsin
- Bakhsh: Bisotun
- Rural District: Cham Chamal

Population (2006)
  - Total: 305
- Time zone: UTC+3:30 (IRST)
  - Summer (DST): UTC+4:30 (IRDT)

Tazehabad-e Nazliyan (Persian: تازه ابادنازليان, also Romanized as Tāzehābād-e Nāzlīyān) is a village in Cham Chamal Rural District, Bisotun District, Harsin County, Kermanshah Province, Iran. At the 2006 census, its population was 305, in 68 families.
