= Tazehabad-e Sarayilan =

Tazehabad-e Sarayilan تازه ابادسرائيلان
- Village
- Location within Iran
- Coordinates: 33°52′54″N 47°08′21″E
- Country: Iran
- Province: Kermanshah
- County: Kermanshah
- Bakhsh: Firuzabad
- Rural District: Jalalvand

Population (2006)
  - Total: 88
- Time zone: UTC+3:30 (IRST)
  - Summer (DST): UTC+4:30 (IRDT)

Tazehabad-e Sarayilan (Persian: تازه ابادسرائيلان, also Romanized as Tāzehābād-e Sarāyīlān; also known as Tāzehābād) is a village in Jalalvand Rural District, Firuzabad District, Kermanshah County, Kermanshah Province, Iran. At the 2006 census, its population was 88, in 20 families.
