= Qolqoleh, Saqqez =

Qolqoleh قلقله
- Village
- Location within Iran
- Coordinates: 36°22′53″N 45°57′50″E
- Country: Iran
- Province: Kurdistan
- County: Saqqez
- Bakhsh: Central
- Rural District: Torjan

Population (2006)
  - Total: 292
- Time zone: UTC+3:30 (IRST)
  - Summer (DST): UTC+4:30 (IRDT)

Qolqoleh (Persian: قلقله) is a village in Torjan Rural District, in the Central District of Saqqez County, Kurdistan Province, Iran. At the 2006 census, its population was 292, in 47 families. The village is populated by Kurds.
