= Tazehabad-e Shir Ali =

Tazehabad-e Shir Ali تازه ابادشيرعلي
- Village
- Country: Iran
- Province: Kermanshah
- County: Qasr-e Shirin
- Bakhsh: Central
- Rural District: Nasrabad

Population (2006)
  - Total: 48
- Time zone: UTC+3:30 (IRST)
  - Summer (DST): UTC+4:30 (IRDT)

Tazehabad-e Shir Ali (Persian: تازه ابادشيرعلي, also Romanized as Tāzehābād-e Shīr ʿAlī) is a village in Nasrabad Rural District (Kermanshah Province), in the Central District of Qasr-e Shirin County, Kermanshah Province, Iran. At the 2006 census, its population was 48, in 9 families.
