= Quri Chay, Bijar =

Quri Chay قوري چاي
- Village
- Location within Iran
- Coordinates: 35°35′45″N 47°52′53″E
- Country: Iran
- Province: Kurdistan
- County: Bijar
- Bakhsh: Chang Almas
- Rural District: Babarashani

Population (2006)
  - Total: 82
- Time zone: UTC+3:30 (IRST)
  - Summer (DST): UTC+4:30 (IRDT)

Quri Chay (Persian: قوري چاي, also Romanized as Qūrī Chāy; also known as Ghūri Chāh and Qorīchāh) is a village in Babarashani Rural District, Chang Almas District, Bijar County, Kurdistan Province, Iran. At the 2006 census, its population was 82, in 18 families. The village is populated by Kurds.
