= Tazehabad, Kuhdasht =

Village in Lorestan, Iran

Tazehabad تازه آباد
- Village
- Location within Iran
- Coordinates: 33°23′11″N 47°11′55″E
- Country: Iran
- Province: Lorestan
- County: Kuhdasht
- Bakhsh: Kunani
- Rural District: Zirtang

Population (2006)
  - Total: 172
- Time zone: UTC+3:30 (IRST)
  - Summer (DST): UTC+4:30 (IRDT)

Tazehabad (Persian: تازه آباد, also Romanized as Tāzehābād; also known as Tāzehābād-e Kūrel) is a village in Zirtang Rural District, Kunani District, Kuhdasht County, Lorestan Province, Iran. At the 2006 census, its population was 172, in 37 families.
