= Qurichai =

Qurichai قوريچاي
- Village
- Location within Iran
- Coordinates: 34°42′44″N 47°34′53″E
- Country: Iran
- Province: Kermanshah
- County: Sonqor
- Bakhsh: Central
- Rural District: Sarab

Population (2006)
  - Total: 186
- Time zone: UTC+3:30 (IRST)
  - Summer (DST): UTC+4:30 (IRDT)

Qurichai (Persian: قوريچاي, also Romanized as Qūrīchā’ī and Qūrī Chāy; also known as Quruchāi) is a village in the Sarab Rural District, which is located in the Central District of Sonqor County, Kermanshah Province, Iran. At the 2006 census, its population was 186, in 43 families.
