= Tazehabad, Kuzaran =

Village in Kermanshah, Iran

Tazehabad تازه آباد
- Village
- Location within Iran
- Coordinates: 33°49′54″N 46°43′34″E
- Country: Iran
- Province: Kermanshah
- County: Kermanshah
- Bakhsh: Kuzaran
- Rural District: Sanjabi

Population (2006)
  - Total: 170
- Time zone: UTC+3:30 (IRST)
  - Summer (DST): UTC+4:30 (IRDT)

Tazehabad (Persian: تازه آباد, also Romanized as Tāzehābād; also known as Tāzehābād-e Sīāh Peleh) is a village in Sanjabi Rural District, Kuzaran District, Kermanshah County, Kermanshah Province, Iran. At the 2006 census, its population was 170, in 39 families.
