= Tahabad-e Jameh Shuran =

Tahabad-e Jameh Shuran تاه آباد جامه شوران
- Village
- Location within Iran
- Coordinates: 35°06′39″N 47°37′32″E
- Country: Iran
- Province: Kurdistan
- County: Qorveh
- Bakhsh: Central
- Rural District: Panjeh Ali

Population (2006)
  - Total: 478
- Time zone: UTC+3:30 (IRST)
  - Summer (DST): UTC+4:30 (IRDT)

Tahabad-e Jameh Shuran (Persian: تاه آباد جامه شوران, also Romanized as Tāhābād-e Jāmeh Shūrān; also known as Parpisha, Par Pīsheh, Tāzehābād, and Tāzehābād-e Jāmeh Shūrān) is a village in Panjeh Ali Rural District, in the Central District of Qorveh County, Kurdistan Province, Iran. At the 2006 census, its population was 478, in 107 families. The village is populated by Kurds.
