= Tazehabad Sufi Baleh =

Tazehabad Sufi Baleh تازه آباد صوفي بله
- Village
- Location within Iran
- Coordinates: 35°35′28″N 46°35′19″E
- Country: Iran
- Province: Kurdistan
- County: Marivan
- Bakhsh: Sarshiv
- Rural District: Gol-e Cheydar

Population (2006)
  - Total: 134
- Time zone: UTC+3:30 (IRST)
  - Summer (DST): UTC+4:30 (IRDT)

Tazehabad Sufi Baleh (Persian: تازه آباد صوفي بله, also Romanized as Tāzehābād Şūfī Baleh; also known as Tāzehābād) is a village in Gol-e Cheydar Rural District, Sarshiv District, Marivan County, Kurdistan Province, Iran. At the 2006 census, its population was 134, in 30 families. The village is populated by Kurds.
