= Tazehabad-e Garaveh =

Tazehabad-e Garaveh تازه ابادگراوه
- Village
- Location within Iran
- Coordinates: 34°26′14″N 45°30′25″E
- Country: Iran
- Province: Kermanshah
- County: Qasr-e Shirin
- Bakhsh: Central
- Rural District: Nasrabad

Population (2006)
  - Total: 124
- Time zone: UTC+3:30 (IRST)
  - Summer (DST): UTC+4:30 (IRDT)

Tazehabad-e Garaveh (Persian: تازه ابادگراوه, also Romanized as Tāzehābād-e Garāveh; also known as Tāzehābād) is a village in Nasrabad Rural District (Kermanshah Province), in the Central District of Qasr-e Shirin County, Kermanshah Province, Iran. At the 2006 census, its population was 124, in 29 families. The village is populated by Kurds.
