= Zagheh, Khoy =

Zagheh زاغه
- Village
- Location within Iran
- Coordinates: 38°42′51″N 44°57′13″E
- Country: Iran
- Province: West Azerbaijan
- County: Khoy
- Bakhsh: Central
- Rural District: Dizaj

Population (2006)
  - Total: 28
- Time zone: UTC+3:30 (IRST)
  - Summer (DST): UTC+4:30 (IRDT)

Zagheh (Persian: زاغه, also Romanized as Zāgheh) is a village in Dizaj Rural District, in the Central District of Khoy County, West Azerbaijan Province, Iran. At the 2006 census, its population was 28, in 7 families.
