= Tazehabad-e Bani Azizi =

Tazehabad-e Bani Azizi تازه ابادباني عزيزي
- Village
- Location within Iran
- Coordinates: 34°42′41″N 46°20′50″E
- Country: Iran
- Province: Kermanshah
- County: Javanrud
- Bakhsh: Central
- Rural District: Bazan

Population (2006)
  - Total: 86
- Time zone: UTC+3:30 (IRST)
  - Summer (DST): UTC+4:30 (IRDT)

Tazehabad-e Bani Azizi (Persian: تازه ابادباني عزيزي, also Romanized as Tāzehābād-e Bānī ‘Azīzī; also known as Tāzehābād-e ‘Azīzī) is a village in Bazan Rural District, in the Central District of Javanrud County, Kermanshah Province, Iran. At the 2006 census, its population was 86, in 16 families.
