= Tazehabad-e Taleqan =

Village in Kermanshah, Iran

Tazehabad-e Taleqan تازه ابادطالقان
- Village
- Location within Iran
- Coordinates: 34°05′25″N 46°38′59″E
- Country: Iran
- Province: Kermanshah
- County: Eslamabad-e Gharb
- Bakhsh: Central
- Rural District: Shiyan

Population (2006)
  - Total: 149
- Time zone: UTC+3:30 (IRST)
  - Summer (DST): UTC+4:30 (IRDT)

Tazehabad-e Taleqan (Persian: تازه ابادطالقان, also Romanized as Tāzehābād-e Ţāleqān) is a village in Shiyan Rural District, in the Central District of Eslamabad-e Gharb County, Kermanshah Province, Iran. At the 2006 census, its population was 149, in 32 families.
