= Qolqoleh, Marivan =

Qolqoleh قلقله
- Village
- Location within Iran
- Coordinates: 35°40′21″N 46°03′03″E
- Country: Iran
- Province: Kurdistan
- County: Marivan
- Bakhsh: Khav and Mirabad
- Rural District: Khav and Mirabad

Population (2006)
  - Total: 641
- Time zone: UTC+3:30 (IRST)
  - Summer (DST): UTC+4:30 (IRDT)

Qolqoleh (Persian: قلقله) is a village in Khav and Mirabad Rural District, Khav and Mirabad District, Marivan County, Kurdistan Province, Iran. At the 2006 census, its population was 641, in 142 families. The village is populated by Kurds.
