= Tazehabad-e Bidgoli =

Village in Kermanshah, Iran

Tazehabad-e Bidgoli تازه ابادبيدگلي
- Village
- Location within Iran
- Coordinates: 34°18′21″N 46°36′05″E
- Country: Iran
- Province: Kermanshah
- County: Kermanshah
- Bakhsh: Kuzaran
- Rural District: Haft Ashiyan

Population (2006)
  - Total: 13
- Time zone: UTC+3:30 (IRST)
  - Summer (DST): UTC+4:30 (IRDT)

Tazehabad-e Bidgoli (Persian: تازه ابادبيدگلي, also Romanized as Tāzehābād-e Bīdgolī; also known as Bīdgol-e ‘Olyā and Tāzehābād-e Bīdgol) is a village in Haft Ashiyan Rural District, Kuzaran District, Kermanshah County, Kermanshah Province, Iran. At the 2006 census, its population was 13, in 4 families.
