= Tazehabad-e Hijan =

Tazehabad-e Hijan تازه آباد هيجان
- Village
- Location within Iran
- Coordinates: 36°04′21″N 47°05′49″E
- Country: Iran
- Province: Kurdistan
- County: Divandarreh
- Bakhsh: Central
- Rural District: Qaratureh

Population (2006)
  - Total: 167
- Time zone: UTC+3:30 (IRST)
  - Summer (DST): UTC+4:30 (IRDT)

Tazehabad-e Hijan (Persian: تازه آباد هيجان, also Romanized as Tāzehābād-e Hījān; also known as Tāzehābād) is a village in Qaratureh Rural District, in the Central District of Divandarreh County, Kurdistan Province, Iran. At the 2006 census, its population was 167, in 28 families. The village is populated by Kurds.
