= Qol Qoleh, Dalahu =

Qol Qoleh قلقله
- Village
- Location within Iran
- Coordinates: 34°31′18″N 45°57′09″E
- Country: Iran
- Province: Kermanshah
- County: Dalahu
- Bakhsh: Central
- Rural District: Ban Zardeh

Population (2006)
  - Total: 158
- Time zone: UTC+3:30 (IRST)
  - Summer (DST): UTC+4:30 (IRDT)

Qol Qoleh (Persian: قلقله; also known as Qol Qoleh-ye Reyjāb) is a village in Ban Zardeh Rural District, in the Central District of Dalahu County, Kermanshah Province, Iran. At the 2006 census, its population was 158, in 26 families.
