= Tazehabad-e Doktor Vase =

Tazehabad-e Doktor Vase تازه آباد دكتر واسع
- Village
- Location within Iran
- Coordinates: 35°27′43″N 47°06′24″E
- Country: Iran
- Province: Kurdistan
- County: Sanandaj
- Bakhsh: Central
- Rural District: Hoseynabad-e Jonubi

Population (2006)
  - Total: 33
- Time zone: UTC+3:30 (IRST)
  - Summer (DST): UTC+4:30 (IRDT)

Tazehabad-e Doktor Vase (Persian: تازه آباد دكتر واسع, also Romanized as Tāzehābād-e Doktor Vāse‘; also known as Tāzehābād) is a village in Hoseynabad-e Jonubi Rural District, in the Central District of Sanandaj County, Kurdistan Province, Iran. At the 2006 census, its population was 33, in 8 families. The village is populated by Kurds.
