= Tazehabad-e Pasikhan =

Tazehabad-e Pasikhan تازه ابادپسيخان
- Village
- Location within Iran
- Coordinates: 37°13′10″N 49°29′32″E
- Country: Iran
- Province: Gilan
- County: Shaft
- Bakhsh: Central
- Rural District: Molla Sara

Population (2006)
  - Total: 96
- Time zone: UTC+3:30 (IRST)
  - Summer (DST): UTC+4:30 (IRDT)

Tazehabad-e Pasikhan (Persian: تازه ابادپسيخان, also Romanized as Tāzehābād-e Pasīkhān; also known as Tāzehābād) is a village in Molla Sara Rural District, in the Central District of Shaft County, Gilan Province, Iran. At the 2006 census, its population was 96, in 21 families.
