= Tazehabad-e Darreh Gerd =

Village in Kermanshah, Iran

Tazehabad-e Darreh Gerd تازه ابادبدره گرد
- Village
- Location within Iran
- Coordinates: 33°57′14″N 46°45′20″E
- Country: Iran
- Province: Kermanshah
- County: Eslamabad-e Gharb
- Bakhsh: Homeyl
- Rural District: Homeyl

Population (2006)
  - Total: 237
- Time zone: UTC+3:30 (IRST)
  - Summer (DST): UTC+4:30 (IRDT)

Tazehabad-e Darreh Gerd (Persian: تازه ابادبدره گرد, also Romanized as Tāzehābād-e Darreh Gerd; also known as Badreh Gerd-e Salīmī, Tāzehābād, and Tāzehābād-e Badr Gerd) is a village in Homeyl Rural District, Homeyl District, Eslamabad-e Gharb County, Kermanshah Province, Iran. At the 2006 census, its population was 237, in 46 families.
