= Tazehabad-e Sarab Tiran =

Village in Kermanshah, Iran

Tazehabad-e Sarab Tiran تازه ابادسراب تيران
- Village
- Location within Iran
- Coordinates: 34°31′13″N 46°35′45″E
- Country: Iran
- Province: Kermanshah
- County: Kermanshah
- Bakhsh: Kuzaran
- Rural District: Sanjabi

Population (2006)
  - Total: 91
- Time zone: UTC+3:30 (IRST)
  - Summer (DST): UTC+4:30 (IRDT)

Tazehabad-e Sarab Tiran (Persian: تازه ابادسراب تيران, also Romanized as Tāzehābād-e Sarāb Tīrān; also known as Tāzehābād-e Sarāb Tīzān) is a village in Sanjabi Rural District, Kuzaran District, Kermanshah County, Kermanshah Province, Iran. At the 2006 census, its population was 91, in 23 families.
