= Tazehabad-e Dulkoru =

Tazehabad-e Dulkoru تازه آباد دول كرو
- Village
- Location within Iran
- Coordinates: 35°02′36″N 46°56′32″E
- Country: Iran
- Province: Kurdistan
- County: Kamyaran
- Bakhsh: Muchesh
- Rural District: Avalan

Population (2006)
  - Total: 79
- Time zone: UTC+3:30 (IRST)
  - Summer (DST): UTC+4:30 (IRDT)

Tazehabad-e Dulkoru (Persian: تازه آباد دول كرو, also Romanized as Tāzehābād-e Dūlkorū; also known as Tāzehābād-e Sar-e Pol) is a village in Avalan Rural District, Muchesh District, Kamyaran County, Kurdistan Province, Iran. At the 2006 census, its population was 79, in 19 families. The village is populated by Kurds.
