= Danan, Iran =

Danan دانان
- Village
- Location within Iran
- Coordinates: 35°01′55″N 47°00′17″E
- Country: Iran
- Province: Kurdistan
- County: Kamyaran
- Bakhsh: Muchesh
- Rural District: Avalan

Population (2006)
  - Total: 298
- Time zone: UTC+3:30 (IRST)
  - Summer (DST): UTC+4:30 (IRDT)

Danan (Persian: دانان, also Romanized as Dānān; also known as Sā‘edābād) is a village in Avalan Rural District, Muchesh District, Kamyaran County, Kurdistan Province, Iran. At the 2006 census, its population was 298, in 69 families. The village is populated by Kurds.
