= Tazehabad-e Karsavan =

Village in Kermanshah, Iran

Tazehabad-e Karsavan تازه ابادكرسوان
- Village
- Location within Iran
- Coordinates: 34°53′38″N 47°49′51″E
- Country: Iran
- Province: Kermanshah
- County: Sonqor
- Bakhsh: Central
- Rural District: Bavaleh

Population (2006)
  - Total: 268
- Time zone: UTC+3:30 (IRST)
  - Summer (DST): UTC+4:30 (IRDT)

Tazehabad-e Karsavan (Persian: تازه ابادكرسوان, also Romanized as Tāzehābād-e Karsavān; also known as Tāzehābād) is a village in Bavaleh Rural District, in the Central District of Sonqor County, Kermanshah Province, Iran. At the 2006 census, its population was 268, in 59 families.
