= Tazehabad, Otaqvar =

Tazehabad تازه آباد تازه آباد لات لیل
- Village
- Location within Iran
- Coordinates: 37°05′54″N 50°09′44″E
- Country: Iran
- Province: Gilan
- County: Langarud
- Bakhsh: Otaqvar
- Rural District: Lat Leyl

Population (2016)
  - Total: 97
- Time zone: UTC+3:30 (IRST)

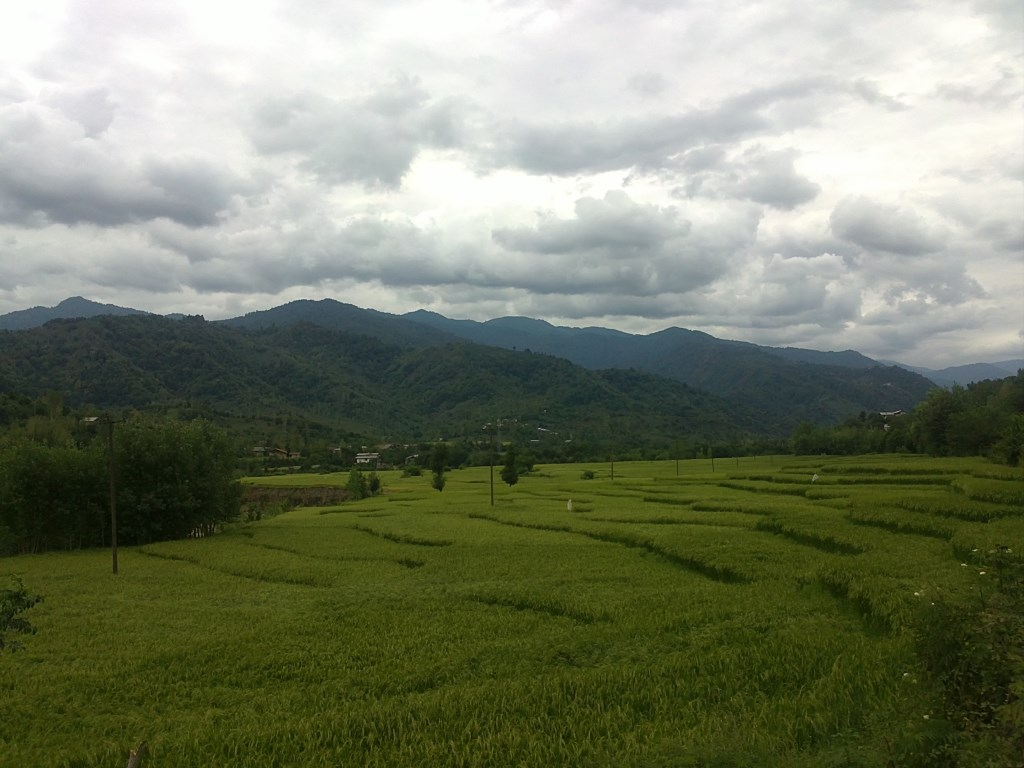
Rice Fields in Tazehabad, Lat Layal

Tazehabad (Persian: تازه آباد, also Romanized as Tāzehābād; also known as Tāzehābād-e Lātleyl) is a village in Lat Leyl Rural District, Otaqvar District, Langarud County, Gilan Province, Iran. At the 2006 census, its population was 119, in 30 families. In 2016, it had 97 people in 33 households.
