= Asiab Jub, Kermanshah =

Asiab Jub اسياب جوب
- Village
- Location within Iran
- Coordinates: 34°58′48″N 47°20′54″E
- Country: Iran
- Province: Kermanshah
- County: Sonqor
- Bakhsh: Kolyai
- Rural District: Agahan

Population (2006)
  - Total: 83
- Time zone: UTC+3:30 (IRST)
  - Summer (DST): UTC+4:30 (IRDT)

Asiab Jub (Persian: اسياب جوب, also Romanized as Āsīāb Jūb; also known as Āsīāb Jūb-e Amjadī) is a village in Agahan Rural District, Kolyai District, Sonqor County, Kermanshah Province, Iran. At the 2006 census, its population was 83, in 17 families.
