= Tazehabad-e Seydali =

Tazehabad-e Seydali تازه ابادصيدعلي
- Village
- Location within Iran
- Coordinates: 34°03′00″N 46°07′00″E
- Country: Iran
- Province: Kermanshah
- County: Gilan-e Gharb
- Bakhsh: Central
- Rural District: Cheleh

Population (2006)
  - Total: 299
- Time zone: UTC+3:30 (IRST)
  - Summer (DST): UTC+4:30 (IRDT)

Tazehabad-e Seydali (Persian: تازه ابادصيدعلي, also Romanized as Tāzehābād-e Şeydʿalī) is a village in Cheleh Rural District, in the Central District of Gilan-e Gharb County, Kermanshah Province, Iran. At the 2006 census, its population was 299, in 70 families.
