= Tazehabad-e Sar Owriyeh =

Tazehabad-e Sar Owriyeh تازه آباد سر اوريه
- Village
- Location within Iran
- Coordinates: 35°05′00″N 47°41′00″E
- Country: Iran
- Province: Kurdistan
- County: Qorveh
- Bakhsh: Central
- Rural District: Badr

Population (2006)
  - Total: 62
- Time zone: UTC+3:30 (IRST)
  - Summer (DST): UTC+4:30 (IRDT)

Tazehabad-e Sar Owriyeh (Persian: تازه آباد سر اوريه, also Romanized as Tāzehābād-e Sar Owrīyeh and Tāzehābād-e Sarāvaryeh; also known as Tāzehābād) is a village in Badr Rural District, in the Central District of Qorveh County, Kurdistan Province, Iran. At the 2006 census, its population was 62, in 12 families. The village is populated by Kurds.
