= Tazehabad-e Miraki =

Tazehabad-e Miraki تازه ابادميركي
- Village
- Country: Iran
- Province: Kermanshah
- County: Javanrud
- Bakhsh: Central
- Rural District: Bazan

Population (2006)
  - Total: 114
- Time zone: UTC+3:30 (IRST)
  - Summer (DST): UTC+4:30 (IRDT)

Tazehabad-e Miraki (Persian: تازه ابادميركي, also Romanized as Tāzehābād-e Mīrakī) is a village in Bazan Rural District, in the Central District of Javanrud County, Kermanshah Province, Iran. At the 2006 census, its population was 114, in 26 families.
