= Tazehabad-e Mowlai =

Tazehabad-e Mowlai تازه ابادمولائي
- Village
- Location within Iran
- Coordinates: 34°31′31″N 46°24′19″E
- Country: Iran
- Province: Kermanshah
- County: Dalahu
- Bakhsh: Gahvareh
- Rural District: Qalkhani

Population (2006)
  - Total: 54
- Time zone: UTC+3:30 (IRST)
  - Summer (DST): UTC+4:30 (IRDT)

Tazehabad-e Mowlai (Persian: تازه ابادمولائي, also Romanized as Tāzehābād-e Mowlā'ī; also known as Tāzehābād) is a village in Qalkhani Rural District, Gahvareh District, Dalahu County, Kermanshah Province, Iran. In the 2006 census, its population was 54, in 11 families.
