= Tazehabad, Eslamabad-e Gharb =

Tazehabad تازه اباد
- Village
- Location within Iran
- Coordinates: 33°51′53″N 46°49′05″E
- Country: Iran
- Province: Kermanshah
- County: Eslamabad-e Gharb
- Bakhsh: Homeyl
- Rural District: Harasam

Population (2006)
  - Total: 176
- Time zone: UTC+3:30 (IRST)
  - Summer (DST): UTC+4:30 (IRDT)

Tazehabad (Persian: تازه اباد, also Romanized as Tāzehābād) is a village in Harasam Rural District, Homeyl District, Eslamabad-e Gharb County, Kermanshah Province, Iran. At the 2006 census, its population was 176, in 38 families.
