= Tazehabad-e Tefli =

Tazehabad-e Tefli تازه‌آباد تفلی
- Village
- Location within Iran
- Coordinates: 35°20′36″N 46°18′31″E
- Country: Iran
- Province: Kurdistan
- County: Sarvabad
- Bakhsh: Central
- Rural District: Kusalan

Population (2006)
  - Total: 200
- Time zone: UTC+3:30 (IRST)
  - Summer (DST): UTC+4:30 (IRDT)

Tazehabad-e Tefli (Persian: تازه‌آباد تفلی, also Romanized as Tāzehābād-e Teflī; also known as Tāzehābād) is a village in Kusalan Rural District, in the Central District of Sarvabad County, Kurdistan Province, Iran. At the 2006 census, its population was 200, in 46 families. The village is populated by Kurds.
