= Tazehabad, Shahin Dezh =

Tazehabad تازه اباد
- Village
- Location within Iran
- Coordinates: 36°23′59″N 46°37′46″E
- Country: Iran
- Province: West Azerbaijan
- County: Shahin Dezh
- Bakhsh: Central
- Rural District: Safa Khaneh

Population (2006)
  - Total: 152
- Time zone: UTC+3:30 (IRST)

Tazehabad (Persian: تازه اباد, also Romanized as Tāzehābād) is a village in Safa Khaneh Rural District, in the Central District of Shahin Dezh County, West Azerbaijan Province, Iran. At the 2006 census, its population was 152, in 24 families.
