= Tazehabad-e Gari Khan Mohammad =

Tazehabad-e Gari Khan Mohammad تازه ابادگاري خان محمد
- Village
- Country: Iran
- Province: Kermanshah
- County: Salas-e Babajani
- Bakhsh: Ozgoleh
- Rural District: Ozgoleh

Population (2006)
  - Total: 41
- Time zone: UTC+3:30 (IRST)
  - Summer (DST): UTC+4:30 (IRDT)

Tazehabad-e Gari Khan Mohammad (Persian: تازه ابادگاري خان محمد, also Romanized as Tāzehābād-e Gārī Khān Moḩammad) is a village in Ozgoleh Rural District, Ozgoleh District, Salas-e Babajani County, Kermanshah Province, Iran. At the 2006 census, its population was 41, in 7 families.
