= Tazehabad-e Murchi =

Tazehabad-e Murchi تازه ابادمورچي
- Village
- Location within Iran
- Coordinates: 34°25′55″N 46°50′26″E
- Country: Iran
- Province: Kermanshah
- County: Kermanshah
- Bakhsh: Central
- Rural District: Baladarband

Population (2006)
  - Total: 120
- Time zone: UTC+3:30 (IRST)
  - Summer (DST): UTC+4:30 (IRDT)

Tazehabad-e Murchi (Persian: تازه ابادمورچي, also Romanized as Tāzehābād-e Mūrchī) is a village in Baladarband Rural District, in the Central District of Kermanshah County, Kermanshah Province, Iran. At the 2006 census, its population was 120, in 29 families.
