= Tazehabad-e Zir Khaki =

Tazehabad-e Zir Khaki تازه ابادزيرخاكي
- Village
- Location within Iran
- Coordinates: 33°41′00″N 47°03′27″E
- Country: Iran
- Province: Ilam
- County: Chardavol
- Bakhsh: Helilan
- Rural District: Helilan

Population (2006)
  - Total: 84
- Time zone: UTC+3:30 (IRST)
  - Summer (DST): UTC+4:30 (IRDT)

Tazehabad-e Zir Khaki (Persian: تازه ابادزيرخاكي, also Romanized as Tāzehābād-e Zīr Khākī; also known as Tāzehābād) is a village in Helilan Rural District, Helilan District, Chardavol County, Ilam Province, Iran. At the 2006 census, its population was 84, in 18 families. The village is populated by Kurds.
