= Mishab, Isfahan =

Mishab ميشاب
- village
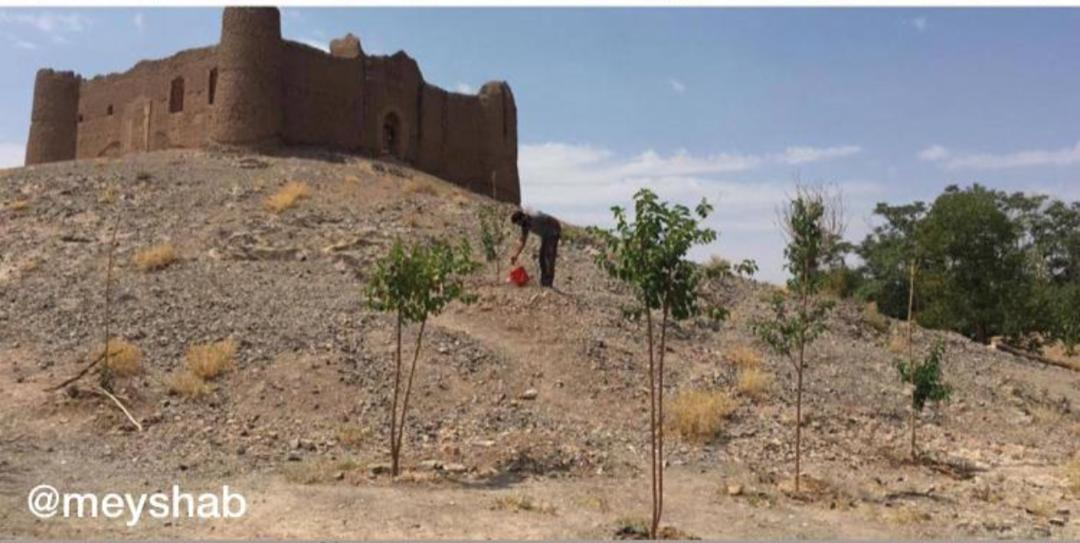

- Location within Iran
- Coordinates: 33°10′19″N 52°34′05″E
- Country: Iran
- Province: Isfahan
- County: Ardestan
- Bakhsh: Central
- Rural District: Kachu

Population (2006)
  - Total: 14
- Time zone: UTC+3:30 (IRST)
  - Summer (DST): UTC+4:30 (IRDT)

Mishab (Persian: ميشاب, also Romanized as Mīshāb) is a village in Kachu Rural District, in the Central District of Ardestan County, Isfahan Province, Iran. At the 2006 census, its population was 14, in 9 families.
