= Tazehabad-e Maran =

Tazehabad-e Maran تازه آباد مران
- Village
- Location within Iran
- Coordinates: 36°16′32″N 47°02′06″E
- Country: Iran
- Province: Kurdistan
- County: Divandarreh
- Bakhsh: Karaftu
- Rural District: Kani Shirin

Population (2006)
  - Total: 149
- Time zone: UTC+3:30 (IRST)
  - Summer (DST): UTC+4:30 (IRDT)

Tazehabad-e Maran (Persian: تازه آباد مران, also Romanized as Tāzehābād-e Marān; also known as Tāzehābād) is a village in Kani Shirin Rural District, Karaftu District, Divandarreh County, Kurdistan Province, Iran. At the 2006 census, its population was 149, in 23 families. The village is populated by Kurds.
