= Tazehabad-e Vazir =

Tazehabad-e Vazir تازه آباد وزير
- Village
- Location within Iran
- Coordinates: 35°59′43″N 47°14′11″E
- Country: Iran
- Province: Kurdistan
- County: Divandarreh
- Bakhsh: Central
- Rural District: Qaratureh

Population (2006)
  - Total: 232
- Time zone: UTC+3:30 (IRST)
  - Summer (DST): UTC+4:30 (IRDT)

Tazehabad-e Vazir (Persian: تازه آباد وزير, also Romanized as Tāzehābād-e Vazīr; also known as Tāzehābād) is a village in Qaratureh Rural District, in the Central District of Divandarreh County, Kurdistan Province, Iran. At the 2006 census, its population was 232, in 46 families. The village is populated by Kurds.
