= Tazehabad-e Sarab =

Tazehabad-e Sarab تازه ابادسراب
- Village
- Location within Iran
- Coordinates: 34°44′32″N 47°34′39″E
- Country: Iran
- Province: Kermanshah
- County: Sonqor
- Bakhsh: Central
- Rural District: Sarab

Population (2006)
  - Total: 156
- Time zone: UTC+3:30 (IRST)
  - Summer (DST): UTC+4:30 (IRDT)

Tazehabad-e Sarab (Persian: تازه ابادسراب, also Romanized as Tāzehābād-e Sarāb; also known as Tājabal and Tāzehābād) is a village in Sarab Rural District, in the Central District of Sonqor County, Kermanshah Province, Iran. At the 2006 census, its population was 156, in 39 families.
