= Banchia-ye Sofla =

Banchia-ye Sofla بانچياسفلي
- Village
- Location within Iran
- Coordinates: 34°42′20″N 46°32′58″E
- Country: Iran
- Province: Kermanshah
- County: Ravansar
- Bakhsh: Central
- Rural District: Dowlatabad

Population (2006)
  - Total: 19
- Time zone: UTC+3:30 (IRST)
  - Summer (DST): UTC+4:30 (IRDT)

Banchia-ye Sofla (Persian: بانچياسفلي, also Romanized as Bānchīā-ye Soflá; also known as Bānchīā-ye ‘Olyā and Tāzehābād-e Bānchīā) is a village in Dowlatabad Rural District, in the Central District of Ravansar County, Kermanshah Province, Iran. At the 2006 census, its population was 19, in 5 families.
