= Tazehabad-e Markazi =

Tazehabad-e Markazi تازه ابادمركزي
- Village
- Location within Iran
- Coordinates: 34°59′40″N 46°24′26″E
- Country: Iran
- Province: Kermanshah
- County: Paveh
- Bakhsh: Central
- Rural District: Shamshir

Population (2006)
  - Total: 58
- Time zone: UTC+3:30 (IRST)
  - Summer (DST): UTC+4:30 (IRDT)

Tazehabad-e Markazi (Persian: تازه ابادمركزي, also Romanized as Tāzehābād-e Markazī; also known as Tāzeh Deh) is a village in Shamshir Rural District, in the Central District of Paveh County, Kermanshah Province, Iran. At the 2006 census, its population was 58, in 13 families.
