= Tazehabad-e Amin, Kermanshah =

Tazehabad-e Amin تازه ابادامين
- Village
- Location within Iran
- Coordinates: 34°44′37″N 46°08′09″E
- Country: Iran
- Province: Kermanshah
- County: Salas-e Babajani
- Bakhsh: Central
- Rural District: Dasht-e Hor

Population (2006)
  - Total: 205
- Time zone: UTC+3:30 (IRST)
  - Summer (DST): UTC+4:30 (IRDT)

Tazehabad-e Amin (Persian: تازه ابادامين, also Romanized as Tāzehābād-e Amīn) is a village in Dasht-e Hor Rural District, in the Central District of Salas-e Babajani County, Kermanshah Province, Iran. At the 2006 census, its population was 205, in 43 families.
