= Tazehabad-e Qaleh Juq =

Tazehabad-e Qaleh Juq تازه آباد قلعه جوق
- Village
- Location within Iran
- Coordinates: 35°25′44″N 46°37′12″E
- Country: Iran
- Province: Kurdistan
- County: Sanandaj
- Bakhsh: Kalatrazan
- Rural District: Kalatrazan

Population (2006)
  - Total: 134
- Time zone: UTC+3:30 (IRST)
  - Summer (DST): UTC+4:30 (IRDT)

Tazehabad-e Qaleh Juq (Persian: تازه آباد قلعه جوق, also Romanized as Tāzehābād Qal‘eh Jūq; also known as Tāzehābād, Tāzehābād-e Qal‘eh Joq, and Tāzeh Deh) is a village in Kalatrazan Rural District, Kalatrazan District, Sanandaj County, Kurdistan Province, Iran. At the 2006 census, its population was 134, in 27 families. The village is populated by Kurds.
