= Howmeh-ye Dehgolan Rural District =

Rural district in Kurdistan province, Iran

Howmeh-ye Dehgolan Rural District Persian: دهستان حومه دهگلان
- Rural District
- Location within Iran Location within Iran Kurdistan
- Coordinates: 35°18′N 47°26′E
- Country: Iran
- Province: Kurdistan
- County: Dehgolan
- District: Central
- Capital: Hasanabad

Population (2016)
  - Total: 7,054
- Time zone: UTC+3:30 (IRST)

Howmeh-ye Dehgolan Rural District (Persian: دهستان حومه دهگلان) is in the Central District of Dehgolan County, Kurdistan province, Iran. Its capital is the village of Hasanabad.

== Demographics ==
=== Population ===
At the time of the 2006 National Census, the rural district's population (as a part of the former Yeylaq District in Qorveh County) was 7,046 in 1,594 households. There were 7,080 inhabitants in 1,942 households at the following census of 2011, by which time the district had been separated from the county in the establishment of Dehgolan County. The rural district was transferred to the new Central District. The 2016 census measured the population of the rural district as 7,054 in 2,121 households. The most populous of its 24 villages was Karvandan, with 1,546 people.
