= Kowleh Rural District =

Rural district in Kurdistan province, Iran

Kowleh Rural District Persian: دهستان كوله
- Rural District
- Location within Iran Location within Iran Kurdistan
- Coordinates: 35°45′33″N 47°03′25″E
- Country: Iran
- Province: Kurdistan
- County: Divandarreh
- District: Saral
- Capital: Kowleh

Population (2016)
  - Total: 4,371
- Time zone: UTC+3:30 (IRST)

Kowleh Rural District (Persian: دهستان كوله) is in Saral District of Divandarreh County, Kurdistan province, Iran. Its capital is the village of Kowleh.

== Demographics ==
=== Population ===
At the time of the 2006 National Census, the rural district's population was 5,996 in 1,245 households. There were 5,396 inhabitants in 1,312 households at the following census of 2011. The 2016 census measured the population of the rural district as 2016, the population of the rural district was 4,371 in 1,133 households. The most populous of its 18 villages was Golaneh, with 618 people.
