= Quri Chay Rural District =

Rural district in Kurdistan province, Iran

Quri Chay Rural District Persian: دهستان قورئ چائ
- Rural District
- Location within Iran Location within Iran Kurdistan
- Coordinates: 35°22′24″N 47°15′18″E
- Country: Iran
- Province: Kurdistan
- County: Dehgolan
- District: Central
- Capital: Qeru Chay

Population (2016)
  - Total: 7,574
- Time zone: UTC+3:30 (IRST)

Quri Chay Rural District (Persian: دهستان قورئ چائ) is in the Central District of Dehgolan County, Kurdistan province, Iran. Its capital is the village of Qeru Chay.

== Demographics ==
=== Population ===
At the time of the 2006 National Census, the rural district's population (as a part of the former Yeylaq District of Qorveh County) was 8,206 in 1,887 households. There were 7,759 inhabitants in 2,167 households at the following census of 2011, by which time the district had been separated from the county in the establishment of Dehgolan County. The rural district was transferred to the new Central District. The 2016 census measured the population of the rural district as 7,574 in 2,304 households. The most populous of its 22 villages was Qeru Chay, with 2,973 people.
