= Yeylaq District =

Former district in Kurdistan province, Iran

Yeylaq District Persian: بخش ئيلان
- Former District
- Location within Iran Location within Iran Kurdistan
- Coordinates: 35°19′15″N 47°21′00″E
- Country: Iran
- Province: Kurdistan
- County: Qorveh
- Capital: Dehgolan

Population (2006)
  - Total: 58,502
- Time zone: UTC+3:30 (IRST)

Yeylaq District (Persian: بخش ئيلان) is a former administrative division of Qorveh County, Kurdistan province, Iran. Its capital was the city of Dehgolan.

== History ==
After the 2006 National Census, the district was separated from the county in the establishment of Dehgolan County.

== Demographics ==
=== Population ===
At the time of the 2006 census, the district's population was 18,649 in 4,372 households.

=== Administrative divisions ===
Yeylaq District Population
Administrative Divisions	2006census"/>
Howmeh-ye Dehgolan RD	7,046
Quri Chay RD	8,206
Yeylaq-e Jonubi RD	16,855
Yeylaq-e Shomali RD	6,169
Dehgolan (city)	20,226
Total	58,502
RD = Rural District
