= Saral Rural District =

Rural district in Kurdistan province, Iran

Saral Rural District Persian: دهستان سارال
- Rural District
- Location within Iran Location within Iran Kurdistan
- Coordinates: 35°43′55″N 46°46′06″E
- Country: Iran
- Province: Kurdistan
- County: Divandarreh
- District: Saral
- Capital: Hezar Kanian

Population (2016)
  - Total: 5,513
- Time zone: UTC+3:30 (IRST)

Saral Rural District (Persian: دهستان سارال) is in Saral District of Divandarreh County, Kurdistan province, Iran. It is administered from the city of Hezar Kanian.

== Demographics ==
=== Population ===
At the time of the 2006 National Census, the rural district's population was 6,869 in 1,336 households. There were 6,406 inhabitants in 1,623 households at the following census of 2011. The 2016 census measured the population of the rural district as 2016, the population of the rural district was 5,513 in 1,386 households. The most populous of its 34 villages was Hezar Kanian (now a city), with 544 people.
