= Yeylaq-e Jonubi Rural District =

Rural district in Kurdistan province, Iran

Yeylaq-e Jonubi Rural District Persian: دهستان ئیلاق جنوبي
- Rural District
- Location within Iran Location within Iran Kurdistan
- Coordinates: 35°06′31″N 47°24′46″E
- Country: Iran
- Province: Kurdistan
- County: Dehgolan
- District: Bolbanabad
- Capital: Gerd Miran-e Olya

Population (2016)
  - Total: 9,254
- Time zone: UTC+3:30 (IRST)

Yeylaq-e Jonubi Rural District (Persian: دهستان ئیلاق جنوبي) is in Bolbanabad District of Dehgolan County, Kurdistan province, Iran. Its capital is the village of Gerd Miran-e Olya. The previous capital of the rural district was the village of Bolbanabad, now a city.

== Demographics ==
=== Population ===
At the time of the 2006 National Census, the rural district's population (as a part of the former Yeylaq District of Qorveh County) was 16,855 in 3,981 households. There were 9,724 inhabitants in 2,566 households at the following census of 2011, by which time the district had been separated from the county in the establishment of Dehgolan County. The rural district was transferred to the new Bolbanabad District. The 2016 census measured the population of the rural district as 9,254 in 2,842 households. The most populous of its 22 villages was Gerd Miran-e Olya, with 1,707 people.
