= Sis Rural District (Dehgolan County) =

Rural district in Kurdistan province, Iran

Sis Rural District Persian: دهستان سيس
- Rural District
- Location within Iran Location within Iran Kurdistan
- Coordinates: 35°10′46″N 47°16′19″E
- Country: Iran
- Province: Kurdistan
- County: Dehgolan
- District: Bolbanabad
- Capital: Sis

Population (2016)
  - Total: 6,347
- Time zone: UTC+3:30 (IRST)

Sis Rural District (Persian: دهستان سيس) is in Bolbanabad District of Dehgolan County, Kurdistan province, Iran. Its capital is the village of Sis.

== History ==
After the 2006 National Census, Yeylaq District was separated from Qorveh County in the establishment of Dehgolan County, and Sis Rural District was created in the new Bolbanabad District.

== Demographics ==
=== Population ===
At the time of the 2011 census, the rural district's population was 6,643 in 1,801 households. The 2016 census measured the population of the rural district as 6,347 in 1,951 households. The most populous of its 19 villages was Sis, with 1,645 people.
