= Yeylaq-e Shomali Rural District =

Rural district in Kurdistan province, Iran

Yeylaq-e Shomali Rural District Persian: دهستان ئيلاق شمالي
- Rural District
- Location within Iran Location within Iran Kurdistan
- Coordinates: 35°29′48″N 47°23′48″E
- Country: Iran
- Province: Kurdistan
- County: Dehgolan
- District: Central
- Capital: Baleh Dasti

Population (2016)
  - Total: 4,601
- Time zone: UTC+3:30 (IRST)

Yeylaq-e Shomali Rural District (Persian: دهستان ئیلاق شمالي) is in the Central District of Dehgolan County, Kurdistan province, Iran. Its capital is the village of Baleh Dasti.

== Demographics ==
=== Population ===
At the time of the 2006 National Census, the rural district's population (as a part of the former Yeylaq District of Qorveh County) was 6,169 in 1,398 households. There were 5,357 inhabitants in 1,475 households at the following census of 2011, by which time the district had been separated from the county in the establishment of Dehgolan County. The rural district was transferred to the new Central District. The 2016 census measured the population of the rural district as 4,601 in 1,387 households. The most populous of its 36 villages was Baleh Dasti, with 1,241 people.
