= Saral District =

District in Kurdistan province, Iran

Saral District Persian: بخش سارال
- District
- Location within Iran Location within Iran Kurdistan
- Coordinates: 35°43′46″N 46°52′53″E
- Country: Iran
- Province: Kurdistan
- County: Divandarreh
- Capital: Hezar Kanian

Population (2016)
  - Total: 9,884
- Time zone: UTC+3:30 (IRST)

Saral District (Persian: بخش سارال) is in Divandarreh County, Kurdistan province, Iran. Its capital is the city of Hezar Kanian.

== History ==
After the 2011 National Census, Hoseynabad-e Shomali Rural District was separated from the district to join Sanandaj County. After the 2016 census, the village of Hezar Kanian was elevated to the status of a city.

== Demographics ==
=== Population ===
At the time of the 2006 census, the district's population was 16,468 in 3,335 households. The following census in 2011 counted 15,277 people in 3,859 households. The 2016 census measured the population of the district as 9,884 inhabitants in 2,519 households.

=== Administrative divisions ===
Saral District Population
Administrative Divisions	2006	2011	2016
Hoseynabad-e Shomali RD (Note: Transferred to Sanandaj County)	3,603	3,475	
Kowleh RD	5,996	5,396	4,371
Saral RD	6,869	6,406	5,513
Hezar Kanian (city) (Note: Became a city after the 2016 census)			
Total	16,468	15,277	9,884
RD = Rural District
