= Bolbanabad District =

District in Kurdistan province, Iran

Bolbanabad District Persian: بخش بلبان آباد
- District
- Location within Iran Location within Iran Kurdistan
- Coordinates: 35°08′39″N 47°19′08″E
- Country: Iran
- Province: Kurdistan
- County: Dehgolan
- Capital: Bolbanabad

Population (2016)
  - Total: 18,794
- Time zone: UTC+3:30 (IRST)

Bolbanabad District (Persian: بخش بلبان آباد) is in Dehgolan County, Kurdistan province, Iran. Its capital is the city of Bolbanabad.

== History ==
After the 2006 National Census, Yeylaq District was separated from Qorveh County in the establishment of Dehgolan County, which was divided into two districts and five rural districts, with the city of Dehgolan as its capital.

== Demographics ==
=== Population ===
At the time of the 2011 census, the district's population was 19,574 people in 5,310 households. The 2016 census measured the population of the district as 18,794 inhabitants in 5,868 households.

=== Administrative divisions ===
Bolbanabad District Population
Administrative Divisions	2011	2016
Sis RD	6,643	6,347
Yeylaq-e Jonubi RD	9,724	9,254
Bolbanabad (city)	3,207	3,193
Total	19,574	18,794
RD = Rural District
