= Central District (Dehgolan County) =

District in Kurdistan province, Iran

Central District (Dehgolan County) Persian: بخش مرکزی شهرستان دهگلان
- District
- Location within Iran Location within Iran Kurdistan
- Coordinates: 35°25′N 47°22′E
- Country: Iran
- Province: Kurdistan
- County: Dehgolan
- Capital: Dehgolan

Population (2016)
  - Total: 45,221
- Time zone: UTC+3:30 (IRST)

The Central District of Dehgolan County (Persian: بخش مرکزی شهرستان دهگلان) is in Kurdistan province, Iran. Its capital is the city of Dehgolan.

== History ==
After the 2006 National Census, Yeylaq District was separated from Qorveh County in the establishment of Dehgolan County, which was divided into two districts and five rural districts, with Dehgolan as its capital.

== Demographics ==
=== Population ===
At the time of the 2011 census, the district's population was 43,270 people in 11,855 households. The 2016 census measured the population of the district as 45,221 inhabitants in 13,520 households.

=== Administrative divisions ===
Central District (Dehgolan County) Population
| Administrative Divisions | 2011 | 2016 |
|---|---|---|
| Howmeh-ye Dehgolan RD | 7,080 | 7,054 |
| Quri Chay RD | 7,759 | 7,574 |
| Yeylaq-e Shomali RD | 5,357 | 4,601 |
| Dehgolan (city) | 23,074 | 25,992 |
| Total | 43,270 | 45,221 |
RD = Rural District
