= Dehgolan County =

County in Kurdistan province, Iran

Dehgolan County Persian: شهرستان دهگلان
- County
- Location of Dehgolan County in Kurdistan province

- Location of Kurdistan province in Iran
- Coordinates: 35°19′N 47°21′E
- Country: Iran
- Province: Kurdistan
- Capital: Dehgolan
- Districts: Central, Bolbanabad

Area
  - Total: 1,235 km^{2} (477 sq mi)

Population (2016)
  - Total: 64,015
  - Density: 51.83/km^{2} (134.2/sq mi)
- Time zone: UTC+3:30 (IRST)

Dehgolan County (Persian: شهرستان دهگلان) (Note: Kurdish: Dêgûlan) is in Kurdistan province, Iran. Its capital is the city of Dehgolan.

== History ==
After the 2006 National Census, Yeylaq District was separated from Qorveh County in the establishment of Dehgolan County, which was divided into two districts and five rural districts, with Dehgolan as its capital.

== Demographics ==
=== Population ===
At the time of the 2011 census, the county's population was 62,844 people in 17,150 households. The 2016 census measured the population of the county as 64,015 in 19,388 households.

=== Administrative divisions ===
Dehgolan County's population history and administrative structure over two consecutive censuses are shown in the following table.

Dehgolan County Population
Administrative Divisions	2011	2016
Central District	43,270	45,221
Howmeh-ye Dehgolan RD	7,080	7,054
Quri Chay RD	7,759	7,574
Yeylaq-e Shomali RD	5,357	4,601
Dehgolan (city)	23,074	25,992
Bolbanabad District	19,574	18,794
Sis RD	6,643	6,347
Yeylaq-e Jonubi RD	9,724	9,254
Bolbanabad (city)	3,207	3,193
Total	62,844	64,015
RD = Rural District

== See also ==
Media related to Dehgolan County at Wikimedia Commons
