= Duzakh Darreh =

Duzakh Darreh or Duzakhdarreh (Persian: دوزخ دره) may refer to:

- Duzakh Darreh, Jiroft, Kerman Province
- Duzakh Darreh, Rigan, Kerman Province
- Duzakh Darreh, Divandarreh, Kurdistan Province
- Duzakh Darreh, Saqqez, Kurdistan Province
