= Mulanabad =

Mulanabad or Moolan Abad or Mowlanabad (Persian: مولان اباد) may refer to:

- Mulanabad, Kermanshah
- Mulanabad, Kurdistan
