= Saqqez =

City in Kurdistan province, Iran

Saqqez سەقز (Sorani Kurdish) Seqiz (Kurmanji Kurdish) سقز (Persian) Seqiz (Syriac)
- City
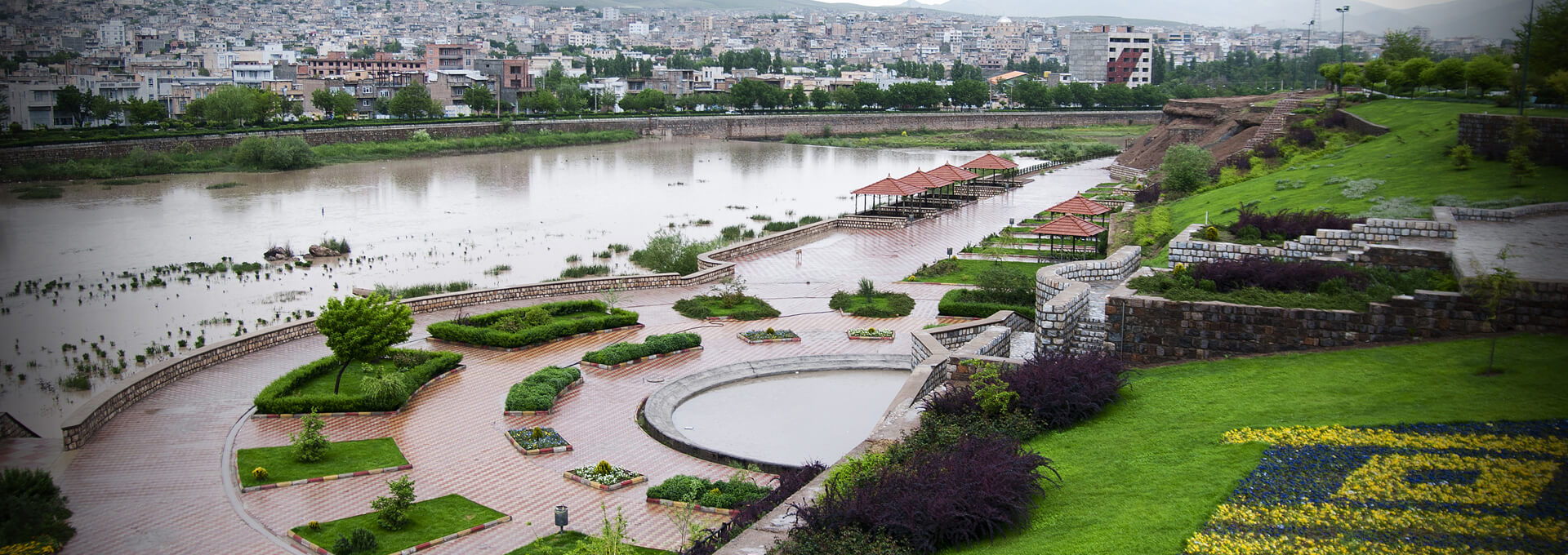
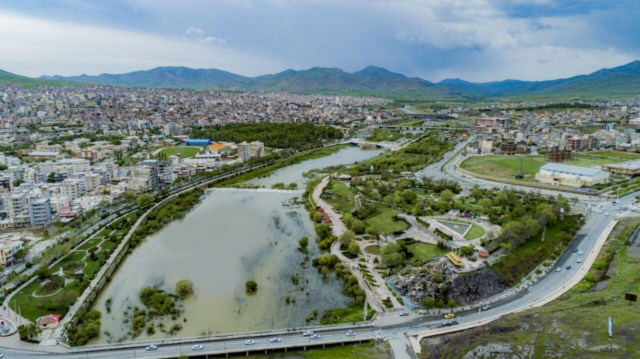
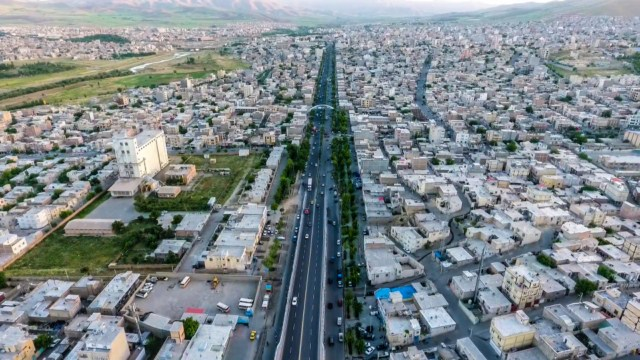
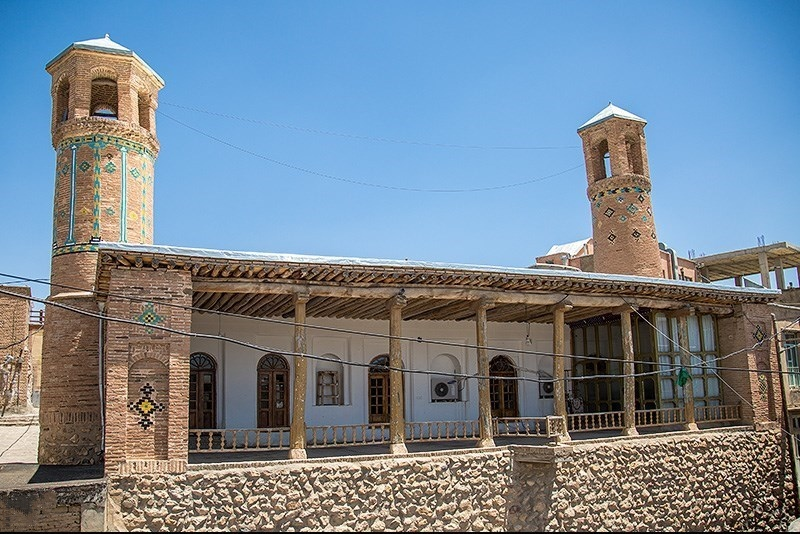
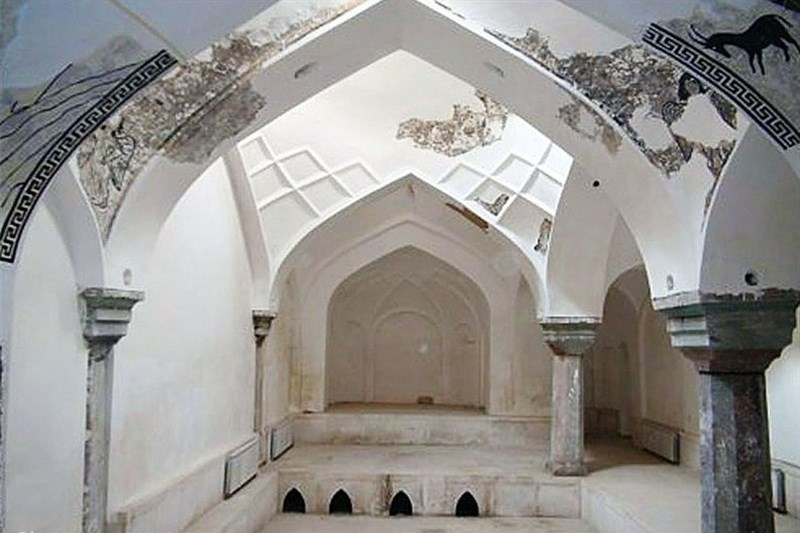
- From top to bottom and from left to right: Kawsar Park in 2022, Saqqez in 2020, Domenareh Historical Mosque, Haj Saleh Historical Bath

- Seal
- Interactive map of Saqqez
- Location within Iran Location within Iran Kurdistan
- Coordinates: 36°14′28″N 46°16′14″E
- Country: Iran
- Province: Kurdistan
- County: Saqqez
- District: Central

Government
  - Mayor: Arastoo Gavili
- Elevation: 1,476 m (4,843 ft)

Population (2016)
  - Total: 165,258
- Time zone: UTC+3:30 (IRST)
- Website: saqqez.ir

Saqqez (Sorani Kurdish: سەقز; Kurdish: Seqiz; Persian: سقز; English: /sæɡɛz/ sa-ghez; Persian pronunciation: [sæɣˈɣez]) (Note: Also known as Saghez, Sakīz, Saqez, Saqiz, and Saqqiz) is a city in the Central District of Saqqez County, Kurdistan province, Iran, serving as capital of both the county and the district.

== Etymology ==
The name Saqqez derives from the Scythian word "Eskit" and then "Sakez". Before that, it was Izirtu, the capital of Mannaeans. In some historical sources it has been mentioned that the name of the city is derived from the name of powerful Median ruler Cyaxares (reigned 625–585 BC), who turned the empire into a regional power, but other historians believe that the name of the city is derived from Sakez and is attributed to the Scythians who settled in the city during the reign of Cyaxares.

== History ==
Saqqez's history goes back to the seventh millennium BC. Based on historical ruins and Antiques which have been found in Saqqez, like the historical treasures of Ziwiye hoard in the Ziwiyeh Castle, experts like Roman Ghirshman believe that the modern city of Saqqez is built on the site of the ancient capital of the Median kingdom. When the Assyrian king Sargon II (reigned 722 – 705 BC) attacked the Median kingdom, he forced them to flee to Ecbatana (modern day Hamadan) and made this city his capital. On the attack of Sargon II, the ruler of Assyria, the Medes were defeated and their fortifications were destroyed. Thereafter, the Scythians tried to rebuild this city and they chose Saqqez, then named Eskit as their capital. This city was repeatedly attacked by Assyrians and Romans.

According to Vladimir Minorsky, Saqqez is the site of the earlier medieval city of Barza. According to Theophanes the Confessor, who calls the city "Barzan" (Ancient Greek: βάρζαν), the Byzantine emperor Heraclius stayed at Barza for seven days in March 628 while on his way to Ganzak. Barza was an important crossroads in the medieval period, where there was a fork in the road from Dinavar to Maragheh with one branch splitting off towards Urmia. In the early 9th century, Barza was the capital of a separate principality.

== Demographics ==
=== Language and ethnicity ===
Most of the people in this city are Kurds who speak the Sorani dialect of the Kurdish language. David D'Beth Hillel (d. 1846) stated that the city was home to a small Jewish community with one synagogue dating from around 1827.

Saqqez linguistic composition
language	percent
Sorani Kurdish	99%
Persian	1%

=== Population ===
At the time of the 2006 National Census, the city's population was 131,349 in 31,336 households. The following census in 2011 counted 139,738 people in 37,262 households. The 2016 census measured the population of the city as 165,258 people in 48,488 households.

== Geography ==
=== Geology ===
The city of Saqqez is built on long plains and hills, which are crossed by the main tributaries of rivers such as Zarrineh River and Simineh River. The lowlands and heights inside the city and the view of Saqqez River that passes through the center of this city are its special features. Saqqez is located in mountainous and highlands between the irregular heights of Zagros Mountains, and this special geomorphological feature has led to relatively cold climates and long winters and sometimes frost.

=== Climate ===
At an altitude of 1,476 metres (4,842 feet), Saqqez has a Mediterranean continental climate (Köppen climate classification Dsa) with hot, very dry summers and cold, snowy winters. Summers feature large diurnal temperature variation due to decreased air density at high altitude and low humidity. In 1969 Saqqez recorded a temperature of −36 °C (−33 °F), the lowest ever recorded by an Iranian weather station until Kheirabad Zanjan recorded −36.4 °C (−33.5 °F) on January 29, 1997. Saqqez again reached −36 °C during the February 3–9 1972 Iran blizzard.

Saqqez unofficially reached −45.8 °C (−50.4 °F) in December 2006 and −42.3 °C (−44.1 °F) in January 2007, the lowest temperatures recorded in an Iranian city. Rainfall is mild throughout the year, with late winter and early spring having the most precipitation, and the summers being practically rainless. Due to the foehn effect, the rainfall is not as heavy as it is in the exposed sites of the Zagros to the west, such as in Sardasht, which lies on the same altitude but is more exposed to the westerly cold front systems.

Climate data for Saqqez, Iran (normals 1991-2020)
Month	Jan	Feb	Mar	Apr	May	Jun	Jul	Aug	Sep	Oct	Nov	Dec	Year
Record high °C (°F)	18.2 (64.8)	20 (68)	26.0 (78.8)	30.4 (86.7)	34.4 (93.9)	39 (102)	43 (109)	42 (108)	39 (102)	32 (90)	26 (79)	22.2 (72.0)	43 (109)
Mean daily maximum °C (°F)	3.6 (38.5)	6.0 (42.8)	11.8 (53.2)	17.5 (63.5)	23.0 (73.4)	29.9 (85.8)	33.9 (93.0)	34.1 (93.4)	29.3 (84.7)	21.9 (71.4)	12.7 (54.9)	6.5 (43.7)	19.2 (66.6)
Daily mean °C (°F)	−2.3 (27.9)	−0.2 (31.6)	5.1 (41.2)	10.4 (50.7)	14.9 (58.8)	20.4 (68.7)	24.7 (76.5)	24.3 (75.7)	19.3 (66.7)	13.0 (55.4)	5.5 (41.9)	0.2 (32.4)	11.3 (52.3)
Mean daily minimum °C (°F)	−7.7 (18.1)	−6.1 (21.0)	−1.6 (29.1)	3.0 (37.4)	5.5 (41.9)	8.4 (47.1)	13.2 (55.8)	12.9 (55.2)	8.2 (46.8)	4.2 (39.6)	−0.7 (30.7)	−5.1 (22.8)	2.9 (37.2)
Record low °C (°F)	−33 (−27)	−36 (−33)	−27.6 (−17.7)	−9 (16)	−5 (23)	−0.6 (30.9)	3.8 (38.8)	4.8 (40.6)	−0.4 (31.3)	−7 (19)	−24 (−11)	−32 (−26)	−36 (−33)
Average precipitation mm (inches)	57.9 (2.28)	59.0 (2.32)	68.8 (2.71)	67.5 (2.66)	36.6 (1.44)	5.7 (0.22)	5.1 (0.20)	1.6 (0.06)	2.4 (0.09)	28.5 (1.12)	66.8 (2.63)	59.4 (2.34)	459.3 (18.07)
Average precipitation days (≥ 1.0 mm)	8.3	7.5	8.7	8.5	5.9	1.2	1	0.4	0.5	4.2	6.7	7	59.9
Average snowy days	7.9	7.4	3.5	0.5	0.1	0	0	0	0	0.1	1.3	4.3	25.1
Average relative humidity (%)	76	72	64	60	56	41	34	30	32	47	66	74	54
Average dew point °C (°F)	−6.3 (20.7)	−5.0 (23.0)	−2.1 (28.2)	1.9 (35.4)	4.7 (40.5)	4.8 (40.6)	6.1 (43.0)	4.3 (39.7)	1.0 (33.8)	0.4 (32.7)	−1.2 (29.8)	−4.4 (24.1)	0.3 (32.6)
Mean monthly sunshine hours	121.5	142.2	177.4	213.1	287.1	345.1	357.4	344.3	311.1	254.3	174.1	123.4	2,851
Source 1: NOAA NCEI
Source 2: IRIMO (sun-extremes)Synoptic Stations Statistics

== Culture and art ==
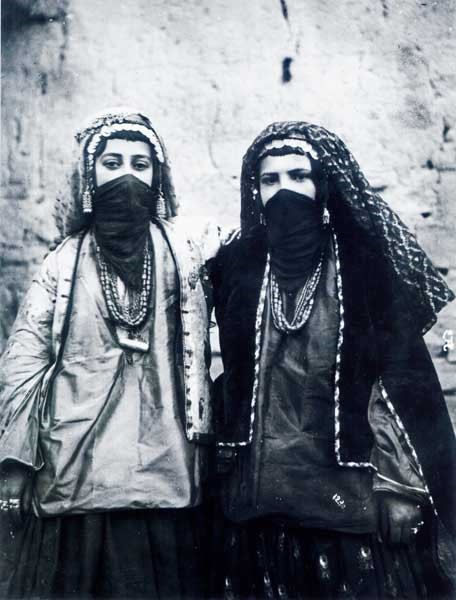
Jewish women from Saqqez in 1930

The city of Saqqez has been a place of culture and art since ancient times. In this city, performing arts and culture has a special place, and artists have created valuable works in various fields of art such as theater, painting, sculpture, music, literature, poetry, and cinema. In this city, every year at the end of the autumn season, a theater festival called The Kurdish Theater Festival is held, in which theater groups from all over Kurdistan perform their works. Also, in Saqqez, famous musicians and singers, such as Rashid Fayznejad perform their music and songs in the Kurdish language. Also there are well-known poets in this city, such as Abdul Karim Sahib, Mullah Ghafoor Dabbaghi, Jila Hosseini, Rahim Loghmani, Malekoalkalam majdi and Sheikh Hassan Molanabad.

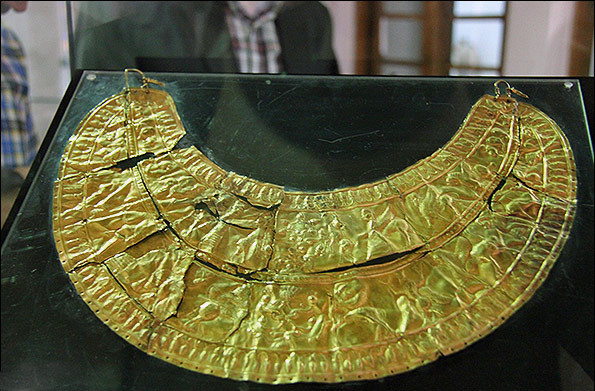
An old golden necklace from the Ziwiye hoard kept in National Museum of Iran

== Transportation ==
This city has an airport and a central bus terminal. Saqqez Airport officially started working after 18 years on 3 November 2023 in the presence of the President of Iran, Ebrahim Raisi. This airport covers several cities in the western part of Iran and a population of nearly one and a half million people, especially Baneh and Marivan free trade zones.

== Notable persons ==
- Mahsa Amini (1999–2022), who was arrested by the Guidance Patrol for allegedly not wearing the hijab in accordance with government standards, and died in police custody in Vozara Detention Center amid assertions of police brutality

== See also ==
- Bazaar of Saqqez
- Domenareh Mosque
- Karaftu Cave
- Haj Saleh Hammam
- Mount Chlchama

== Sources ==
- Bosworth, C.E. (1995). "Saḳḳiz". In Bosworth, C. E.; van Donzel, E.; Heinrichs, W. P. & Lecomte, G. (eds.). The Encyclopaedia of Islam, Second Edition. Volume VIII: Ned–Sam. Leiden: E. J. Brill. p. 895. ISBN 978-90-04-09834-3.
- Grami, Bahram (2015). "Saqqez". Encyclopaedia Iranica.
