= Qalaychi =

Qalaychi (Persian: قلايچي) may refer to:

- Qalaychi, West Azerbaijan
- Qalaychi, Zanjan
