= Bazaar of Saqqez =

- بازار سقز
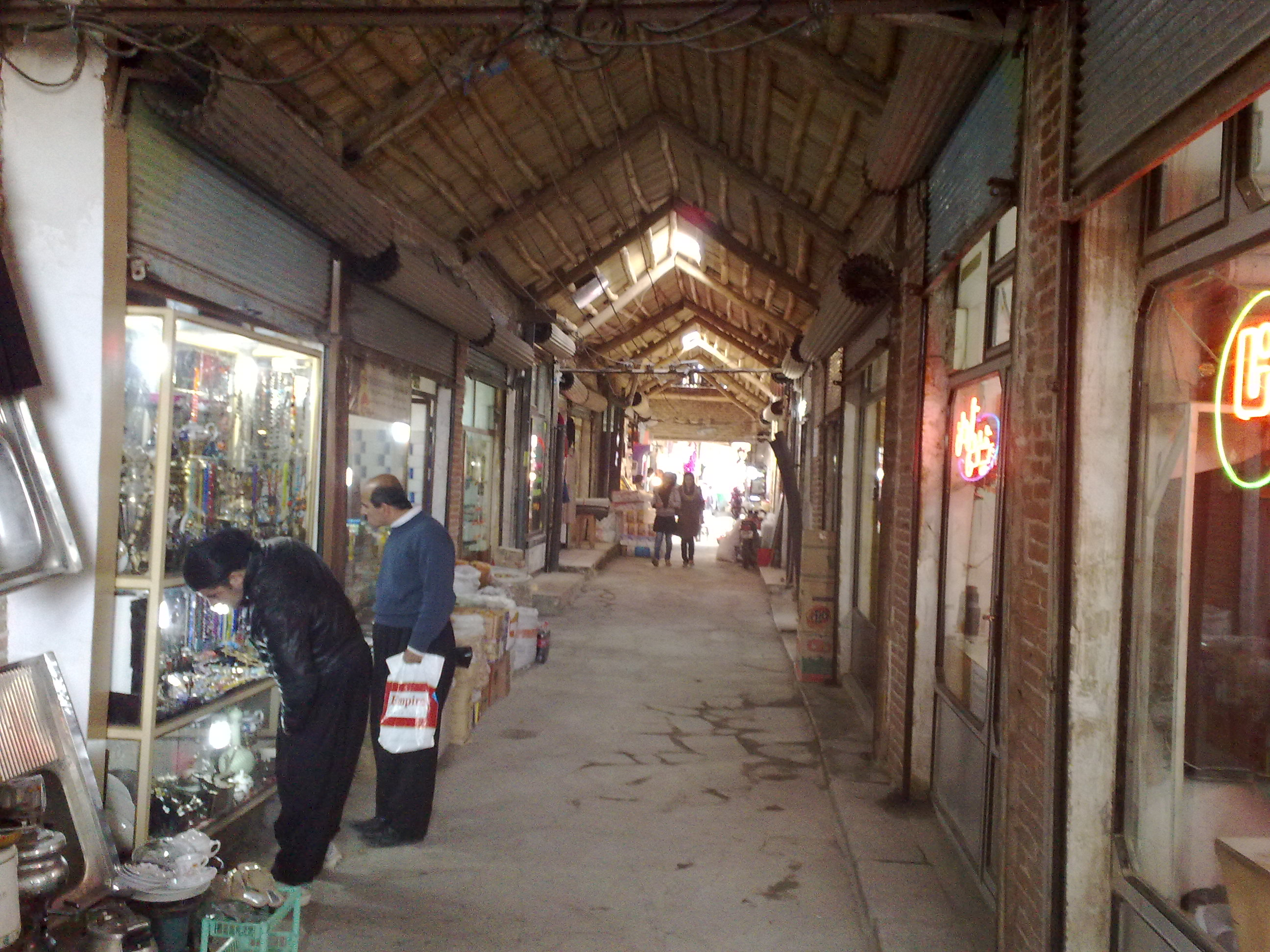
- Interactive map of the Bazaar of Saqqez area

General information
- Architectural style: Kurdish
- Location: Saqqez, Iran
- Coordinates: 36°14′47″N 46°15′59″E
- Construction started: mid 1800s

Technical details
- Structural system: Bazaar (Welfare)
- Size: 30,000 m2 (presumed)

Design and construction
- Architect: Zand territories

The Bazaar of Saqqez is a historical complex and place of trade of various goods between merchants of the region and across Iran, which is located in the center of Saqqez and plays a major role in the trade of various goods between Iran, Iraq and Turkey.

== History ==
This Bazaar is one of the historical places of Rojhalat, which according to the remaining buildings of caravanserais and bazaars such as Tajvanchi Caravanserai and Jewish Bazaar, dates back to the time of Zandieh, which flourished and was restored during the Safavid and Qajar eras. The revival of historical bazaar centers such as Haj Saleh Hammam, Domenareh Mosque and caravanserais and the construction of a historical museum are being studied and carried out.

== The structure of the Bazzar ==
This bazaar consists of two main parts between the Castle bazaar and Sarpacheh bazaar, which are separated by the covered river Vali Khan (now Fakhr Razi Street). Saqqez Bazzar consists of several smaller Bazaars that are divided according to the goods offered and the sellers. These markets include the "Bazzar of Bala", which sells luxury goods, and the "Bazzar of Paein", which sells traditional goods such as textiles, wedding accessories and agricultural items. There are other markets, such as the Jewish market, which is now home to tailors and clothing manufacturers, and the Kazakhkhaneh market, which is now widely visited by travelers.

== Specification ==
Saqez Bazaar is known as the fabric hub of Iran due to the large number of shops and merchants of textiles and clothing, and this market is one of the main centers for the distribution of textiles and clothing in the region and Iran, with more than 500 main shops and markets of textiles and clothing. Sales of especially Kurdish women's clothing fabrics are active in the complex of shops and markets of the Silk bazaar, behind the Day Bazaar (Kazakhkhaneh), Ardalan Bazaar, Bala Bazaar and Azadi Underpass.

== Gallery ==
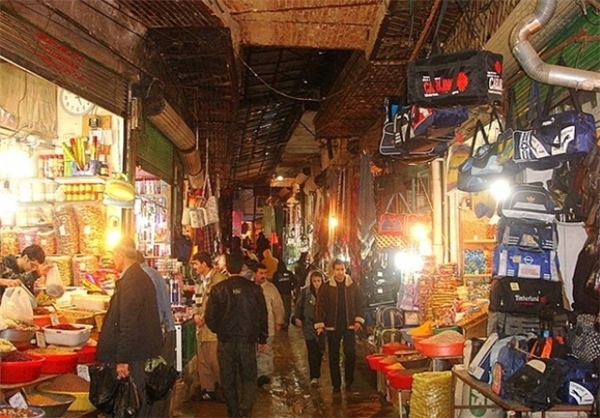
Ardalan Bazzar

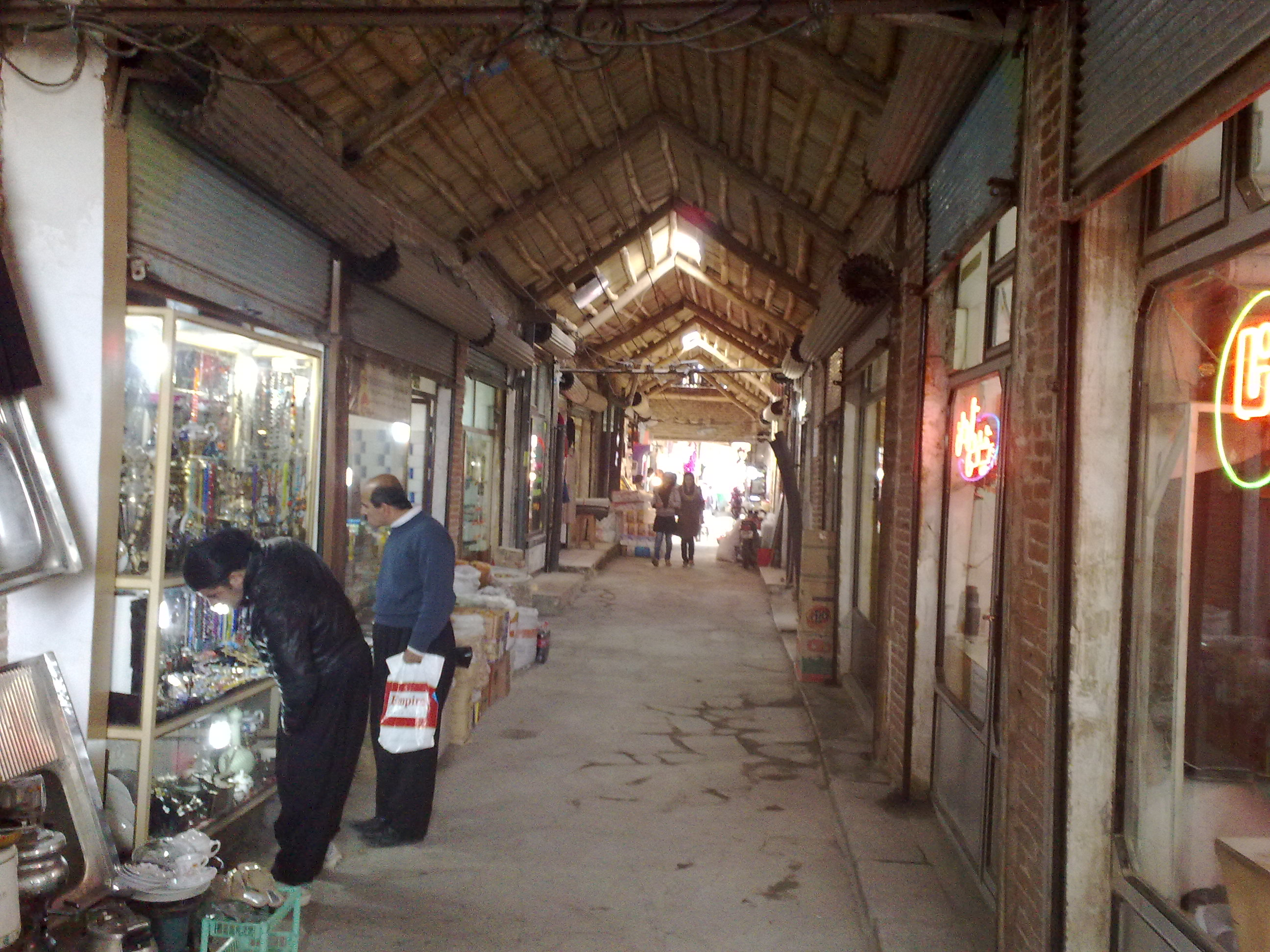
Jewish Bazzar in 2013

== See also ==
- Economy of Iran
- Iranian architecture
