= Qalaichi =

Iron Age archaeological site in Iran

- سه گردان، قلایچی ، قلایه چی Ghalay-chi
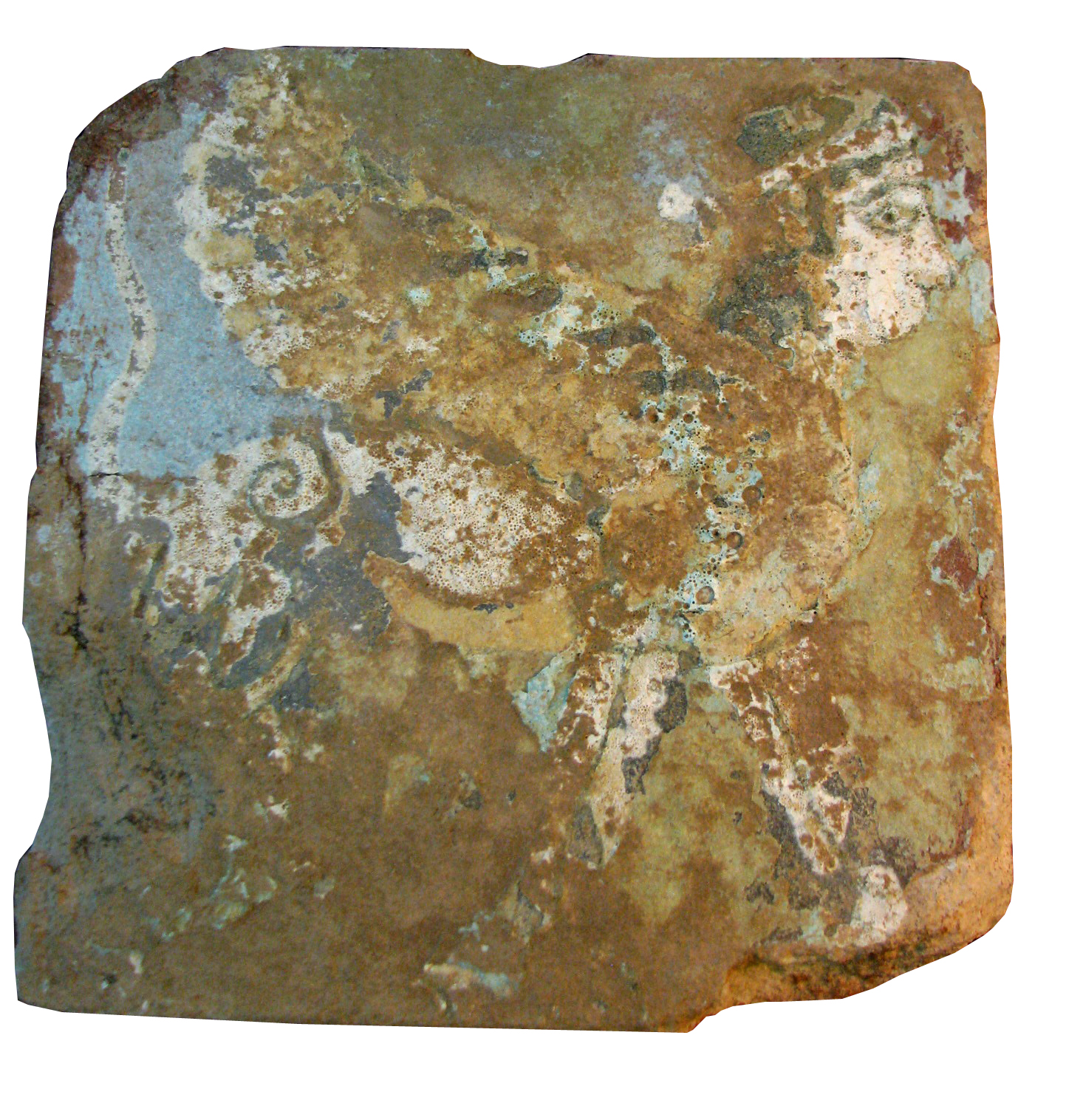
- Glazed tile excavated by B. Kargar from Qalaichi in the Urmia Museum. Depicted is a winged sphinx.

- Location within Iran
- 36°34′13″N 46°16′31″E
- Type: settlement
- Periods: Mannean
- Cultures: Iron Age II and III
- Associated with: 0
- Location: Bukan, Iran
- Region: West Azerbaijan province

History
- Built: 9th-7th century BCE
- Abandoned: ?

Site notes
- Material: stone, mud brick, baked brick
- Height: 1,507 m (4,944 ft)
- Length: 93 m (305 ft)
- Width: 102 m (335 ft)
- Excavation dates: 1985, 1999-2006
- Archaeologists: E. Yaghmaei, B.Kargar
- Condition: plundered, later excavated
- Owner: public
- Public access: accessible

Qalaichi, Ghalay-chi, قلایچی in Persian (UTM 38S 615552 m E 4046795 m N) is an important archaeological site for the Iron Age of north-western Iran. It is a mound 11 metres (36 ft) high, situated about 9 kilometres (5.6 mi) north-west of Bukan City in West Azerbaijan Province 18 kilometres (11 mi) away from the border of Kurdistan province. The site is located near a village from whence it got its name. Hills and mountains surround it; the highest one in the east is the so-called Kal-Tage.

Modern Qalaichi may have been Zirta/Izirta, the capital of the Mannaean Kingdom. The main period of occupation extended from the 9th to 7th centuries BCE.

== Discoveries ==
Key archaeological finds include a stele inscribed with an Aramaic text. The stele is dated to around 700 BCE. It is a fragment consisting of "most likely either a dedicatory or memorial inscription set up by the local ruler." The use of Aramaic, the lingua franca of the neighboring Assyrian Empire, suggests that Aramaic was prestigious among Mannaean elites around the time the stele was erected, but does not necessarily indicate wider adoption of Aramaic in Mannaea. The surviving fragment fails to record any personal names, but does record the names of the Urartian god Ḫaldi and the god Hadad from Ancient Semitic religion, as well as a place name rendered as Ztr. This place name was suggested by M. A. Lemaire to correspond to Zirta/Izirta.

In addition, the ancient settlement yielded a large number of glazed objects. Some of these objects are monochrome and the others show complex compositions. The excavated artifacts are now in the collections of Urmia Museum and Tehran National Museum.
