= Jila Hosseini =

Iranian Kurdish poet and writer

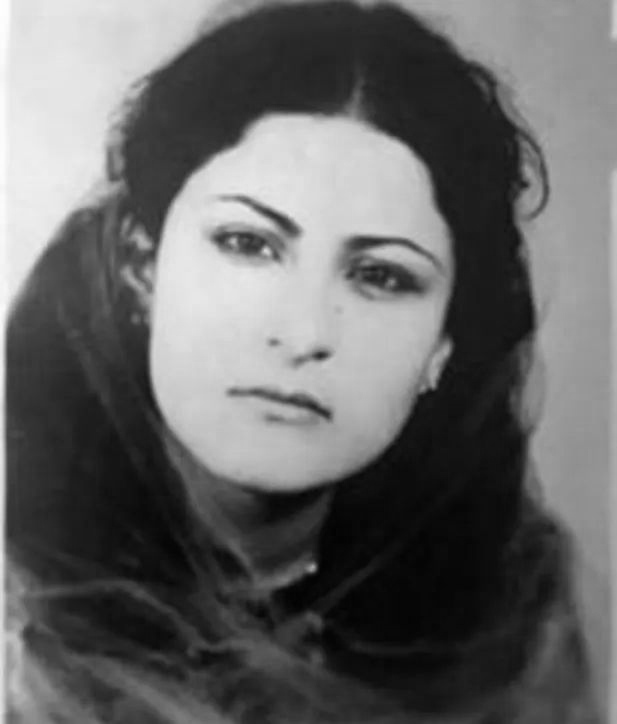
- Native name: ژیلا حسینی
- Born: September 22, 1964 Saqqez, Iran
- Died: September 27, 1996 (aged 32) Tehran, Iran
- Resting place: Dozaghara Cemetery, Saqqez
- Occupation: Poet, writer
- Children: 3

Jila (Zhila) Hosseini (1964–1996), poet, writer, researcher and radio announcer, was born on September 22, 1964, in Saqqez, Iran and was the first Kurdish woman to compose modern poems instead of classical poetry.

== Short biography ==
Jila was born in Saqqez in Iran. She had a supporting family and Sheikh Abdul Qadir, her father's grandfather, was a calligrapher and poet. Zhila's father, Sheikh Mehran Hosseini, was a judge of justice and an intellectual. She was born into a traditional culture with cumbersome rules and liked to change those old traditions. Under the situation that all educational Centers including universities and Schools were closed caused by Iranian Cultural Revolution, She got married at a young age but her tendency towards modernity influenced her private life and she divorced once. At the age of 32 while going to visit the great poet of Kurdistan, Sherko Bekas, she died in a car accident. After the death of Zhila, Sherko Bekas composed a poem for her:

I dreamed of a fairy angel
I have seen it myself
Jila is now among the clouds
She is sitting on a purple chair
And writes poetry
She is wearing a moonlit skirt

== Poems ==
New Kurdish poetry began its evolution several decades ago and naturally progressed to the advanced stages in Kurdish language literature. Zhila's poems in Kurdish literature helped to open new windows in modern poem. She was the first Kurdish woman poet to compose modern Kurdish poems. She was a pioneer in composing poetry in a modern style among female poets in Kurdistan. She was inspired by Sherko Bekas. There were two different stages in the evolution of her poems. First she didn't has her own language and style but in the second stage she found her own style of composing poems.

== ‌Books ==
Some of Jila's poems are published as follows:

- Poetry book (Kurdish) گه شه ی ئه وین (The joy of love), first edition of Sanandaj, 1995.
- Poetry book (Kurdish) قه‌لای راز (Secret Castle), first edition of Tehran, 1998. This book was published in three parts.

Part 1: Zhila's remaining Kurdish poems
Part 2: A selection of her Kurdish short stories
Part 3: The Persian poems of Zhila (she had chosen the title of Rain for this collection)

== English Translation ==
Jila (Zhila) Hosseini's poems "Night Story", "Question" and "Bliss" have been translated into English by Haidar Khezri and Tyler Fisher for Y’alla (University of Texas at Austin) and Poet Lore.
