= Mannaea =

Ancient kingdom south of Lake Urmia

Kingdom of Mannaea Mannaea
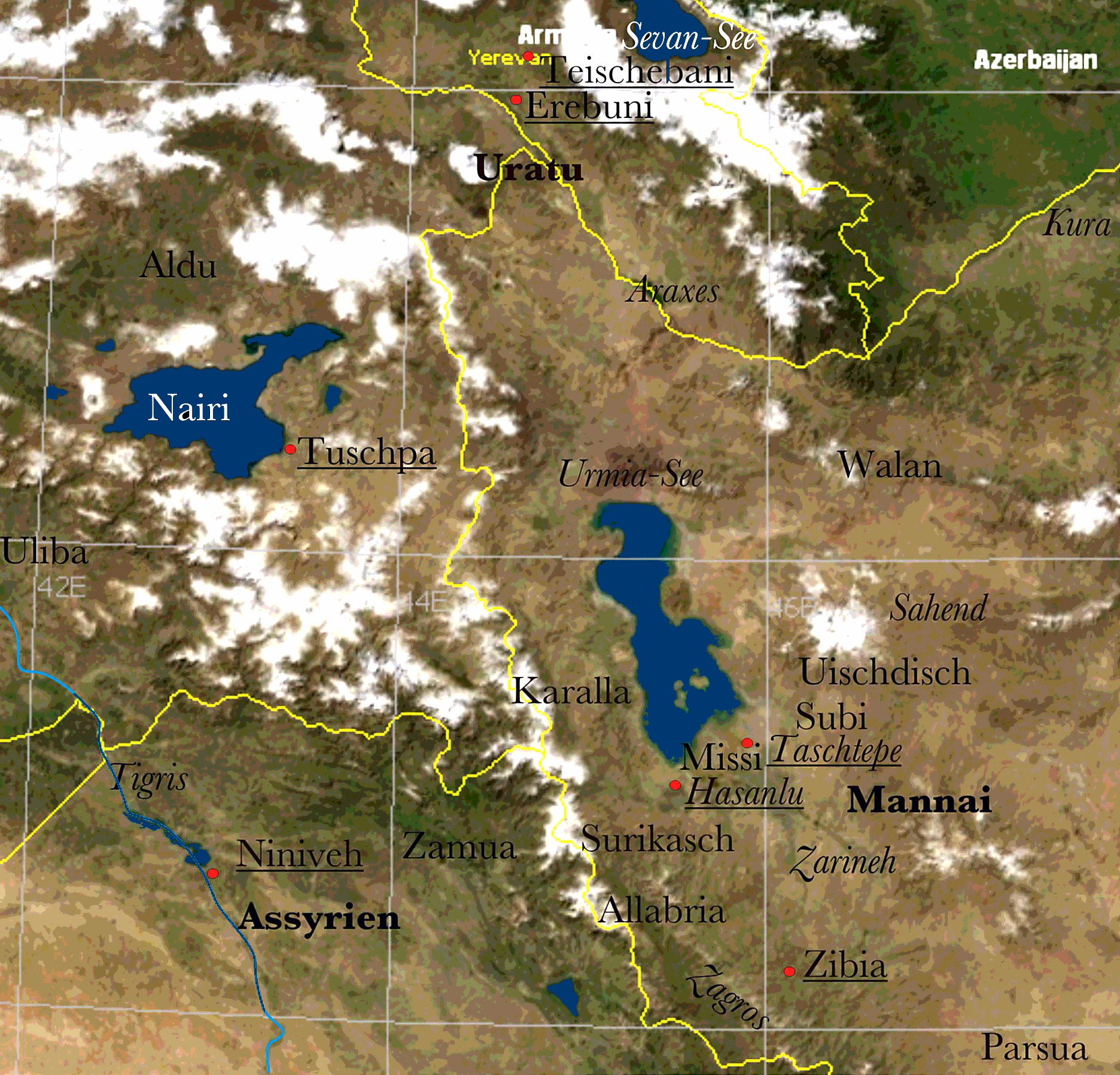
- The historical territory of the state of Mannaea
- Capital: Izirtu
- Religion: polytheism
- Historical era: Antiquity
Succeeded by
Neo-Assyrian Empire
- Today part of: Iran

Mannaea (/məˈniːə/, sometimes written as Mannea; Akkadian: Mannai, Biblical Hebrew: Minni (מנּי)) was an ancient kingdom that flourished in northwestern Iran, primarily south and southeast of Lake Urmia, during the early first millennium BCE, roughly from the 10th to the 7th century BCE. It developed into a prominent regional power along the northeastern frontier of the Neo-Assyrian Empire, situated between major neighbors like Urartu and a constellation of smaller buffer states, such as Zikirta and Musasir. The capital of Mannaea was likely at Izirtu, near modern-day Saqqez.

Mannaea played a key role in the shifting alliances between the Assyrian and Urartian empires, acting alternately as ally and adversary. Archaeological and textual evidence points to a complex society with fortified cities, regional governors, and a tributary economy. Although its exact ethno-linguistic identity remains uncertain, Assyrian sources suggest the Mannaeans spoke an unidentified language. Some scholars link it to the Hurro-Urartian family, while others, based on recent genetic evidence from Hasanlu Tepe, propose ties to Armenian or a distinct non-Indo-Iranian language.

The kingdom ultimately declined under pressure from expanding Assyrian and Median influence, and by the late 7th century BCE, it was absorbed into the Median kingdom. Mannaea is occasionally referenced in classical and biblical sources under the name "Minni."

== Etymology of name ==
The name of Mannaea and its earliest recorded ruler Udaki were first mentioned in an inscription from the 30th year of the rule of Shalmaneser III (828 BC). The Assyrians usually called Manna the "land of the Mannites", Manash, while the Urartians called it the land of Manna.

Describing the march of Salmanasar III in the 16th year (843 BC), it was reported that the king reached the land of Munna, occupying the interior of Zamua. However, the chronicle does not mention any march or taxation on the state of Mannaea. It is possible that the Assyrians either failed to conquer Mannaea, or advanced only to the border of Mannaea, and then changed course and marched on the neighboring country of Allarabia.

In the Bible (Jeremiah 51:27), Mannaea is called "Minni", and is mentioned with Ararat and Ashkenaz as some of the future destroyers of neo-Babylon. The Jewish Encyclopedia (1906), identified Minni with Armenia:

According to the Peshiṭta and Targum Onkelos, the "Minni" of the Bible (Jer. li. 27) is Armenia—or rather a part of that country, as Ararat is also mentioned (Isa. xxxvii. 38; II Kings xix. 37) as a part of Armenia.

It can also relate to one of the regions of ancient Armenia, such as Manavasean (Minyas). Together with Ararat and Ashkenaz, this is probably the same Minni from the Assyrian inscriptions, corresponding to Mannea. The name "Armenia" has been theorized by some scholars as possibly deriving from "ḪAR Minni," meaning, the "mountains of Minni."

== Location ==
Their kingdom was situated east and south of the Lake Urmia. Excavations that began in 1956 succeeded in uncovering Ziwiyeh and its branches the fortified city of Hasanlu, once thought to be a potential Mannaean site. The site of Qalaichi near the modern city of Bukan in West Azerbaijan Province has been linked to the Mannaeans based on a stela with this toponym found at the site.

After suffering several defeats at the hands of both Scythians and Assyrians, the remnants of the Mannaean populace were absorbed by the Matieni and the area became known as Matiene. It was then annexed by the Medes in about 609 BC.

== Language and ethnicity ==
According to examinations of place and personal names recorded in Assyrian and Urartian texts, the Mannaeans—especially the ruling class—likely spoke an isolated language that belonged to neither the Semitic nor the Indo-European families. There is a hypothesis suggesting it may have been related to Urartian. However, recent genetic studies of individuals from Hasanlu Tepe have led scholars to suggest a possible Indo-European presence in the region, potentially linked to speakers of a language related to Armenian.

According to the Encyclopædia Iranica:

Manneans were a Hurrian group with a slight Kassite admixture. It is unlikely that there was any ethnolinguistic unity in Mannea. Like other peoples of the Iranian plateau, the Manneans were subjected to an ever increasing Iranian (i.e. Indo-European) penetration. Boehmer's analysis of several anthroponyms and toponyms needs modification and augmentation. Melikishvili (1949, p. 60) tried to confine the Iranian presence in Mannea to its periphery, pointing out that both Daiukku (cf. Schmitt, 1973) and Bagdatti were active in the periphery of Mannea, but this is imprecise, as the names of two early Mannean rulers, viz. Udaki and Azā, are explicable in Old Iranian terms.

According to Robert H. Dyson, Jr.

The Mannaeans, a little known people related linguistically to the Urartians and the Hurrians of northern Mesopotamia, were settled on the southeastern shore of Lake Urmia and southward into the mountain area of Urmia.

Genetic research has contributed to the debate over the origins and linguistic identity of populations associated with Mannaea. A 2022 study by Lazaridis et al. analyzed individuals from Hasanlu and found that they carried Y-chromosome haplogroups such as R-M12149 (a branch of R1b), linked to Yamnaya steppe ancestry, but lacked R1a subclades like R-Z93, typically associated with early Indo-Iranian speakers. This suggests that while the population had steppe-related ancestry, it was distinct from contemporaneous Indo-Iranian groups. The same study identified genetic affinities between Hasanlu and Bronze Age populations of the Armenian Highlands, raising the possibility that they spoke either a language related to Armenian or a separate non-Indo-European language indigenous to the region.

These findings are supported by archaeological parallels between Hasanlu and the Trialeti-Vanadzor culture (c. 2400–1500 BCE), which is often associated with the early Proto-Armenian horizon. Both cultures show steppe-related ancestry and similar material traits. Genetic analysis suggest that regions such as Mannaea and Hasanlu served as contact zones between steppe-derived and local populations, with Hasanlu playing a role in the Proto-Armenian context. The Armenian language, a distinct branch of the Indo-European family, shares features with Greek, suggesting a shared contact zone within the Yamnaya horizon. Donald Ringe and Tandy Warnow argue that Pre-Armenian formed a subgroup after 2500 BCE. David W. Anthony places Pre-Armenian's split around 2800 BCE. While the precise linguistic affiliations remain debated, archaeological and genetic evidence suggest that both Hasanlu and Mannaea may have played a role in the broader context of Proto-Armenian ethnogenesis.

== History ==
The Mannaean kingdom began to flourish around 850 BC. The Mannaeans were mainly a settled people, practicing irrigation and breeding cattle and horses. The capital was a fortified city called Izirtu (Zirta).

By the 820s BC, Manneaea had expanded to become a large state. By this time they had a prominent aristocracy as a ruling class, which somewhat limited the power of the king.

Beginning around 800 BC, the region became contested ground between Urartu, which built several forts on the territory of Mannaea, and Assyria. In the mid-8th century BC, during the open conflict between the Assyrians and the Urartians, Mannaea seized the opportunity to enlarge its holdings. The Mannaean kingdom reached the height of its power during the reign of Iranzu (c. 725–720 BC).

In 716 BC, king Sargon II of Assyria moved against Mannaea, where the ruler of Mannaea, Aza, the son of Iranzu, had been deposed by Ullusunu with the help of the Urartians. Sargon took Izirtu, and stationed troops in Parsua (Parsua was distinct from Parsumash located further southeast in what is today known as Fars province in Iran.). The Assyrians thereafter used the area to breed, train and trade horses.

According to one Assyrian inscription, the Cimmerians (Gimirru) originally went forth from their homeland of Gamir or Uishdish in "the midst of Mannai" around this time. The Cimmerians first appear in the annals in the year 714 BC, when they apparently helped the Assyrians to defeat Urartu. Urartu chose to submit to the Assyrians, and together the two defeated the Cimmerians and thus kept them out of the Fertile Crescent. The Cimmerians again rebelled against Sargon by 705 BC, and he was killed while driving them out. By 679 BC the Cimmierians migrated to the east and west of Mannaea.

The Mannaeans are recorded as rebelling against Esarhaddon of Assyria in 676 BC, when they attempted to interrupt the horse trade between Assyria and its colony of Parsua.

The Mannaean king Ahsheri, who ruled until the 650s BC, continued to enlarge the territory of Mannaea, although paying tribute to Assyria. However, Mannaea suffered a crushing defeat at the hands of the Assyrians around 660 BC, and subsequently an internal revolt broke out, continuing until Ahsheri's death. Also in the 7th century BC, Mannaea was defeated by the advancing Scythians, who had already raided Urartu and been repelled by the Assyrians. This defeat contributed to the further break-up of the Mannaean kingdom.

Ualli, Ahsheri's successor and an Assyrian ally, sided with the Assyrians against the Medes (Madai), who were still based to the east along the southwest shore of the Caspian Sea and revolting against Assyrian domination. The Medes subjugated by Assyria. However, the Neo-Assyrian Empire, which had dominated the region for three hundred years, began to unravel, consumed by civil war after the death of Ashurbanipal in 627 BC. The upheavals in Assyria allowed the Medes to free themselves from Assyrian vassalage and make themselves the major power in Iran. At the battle of Qablin in 616 BC, the Assyrian and Mannaean forces were defeated by Nabopolassar's troops. This defeat laid open the frontiers of Mannaea, which fell under the control of Media between 615 BC and 611 BC.

== Archaeology ==
Key archaeological finds include a stele inscribed with an Aramaic text discovered at the archaeological cite of Qalaichi. The stele is dated to around 700 BCE. It is a fragment consisting of "most likely either a dedicatory or memorial inscription set up by the local ruler." The use of Aramaic, the lingua franca of the neighboring Assyrian Empire, suggests that Aramaic was prestigious among Mannaean elites around the time the stele was erected, but does not necessarily indicate wider adoption of Aramaic in Mannaea. The surviving fragment fails to record any personal names, but does record the names of the Urartian god Ḫaldi and the god Hadad from Ancient Semitic religion, as well as a place name rendered as Ztr. This place name was suggested by M. A. Lemaire to correspond to Zirta/Izirta.

== See also ==
- History of Iran
- Assyria
- Urartu
- Median kingdom
- Muracan
