= Iranzu =

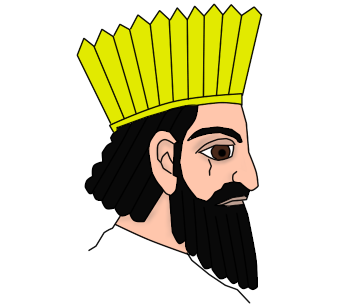
Iranzu

Iranzu was an important king of Mannae. He is said to have risen to power circa 725 BCE during a period of struggle between the Assyrians and the Urartians.

Iranzu, king of the Mannaeans (a people who lived in northwestern Iran) to personally meet with Tiglath-Pileser in 744 and forged an alliance. Iranzu's predecessors had usually maintained their kingdom's independence through changing allegiance between Urartu and Assyria, but Iranzu made a firm choice to side with Assyria and Tiglath-Pileser eagerly accepted the alliance since Iranzu's realm was ideally placed to protect Assyria from Urartian raids.

King Iranzu died in 716 BC (estimated). His son Aza succeeded him.
