= Haj Saleh Hammam =

Hammam in Saqqez, Iranian national heritage site

- حەمامی حاج ساڵە
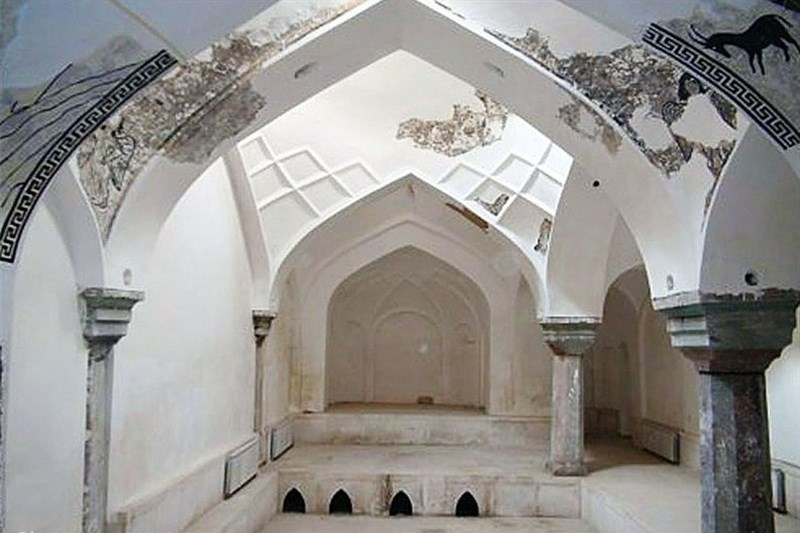

- Location within Iran

General information
- Status: Cultural
- Type: Hammam
- Architectural style: Iranian architecture
- Location: Saqqez, Iran
- Coordinates: 36.23853°N 46.26904°E

Haj Saleh Hammam (Sorani Kurdish: حەمامی حاج ساڵە; Persian: حمام حاج صالح) is a historic hammam located in Saqqez, Iran. It belongs to the Safavid and Zand eras and is located in the old part of the city within the Bazaar of Saqqez. This historic building was registered as a national monument of Iran on 7 November 2000, with the number 2830.

== Structure ==
This hammam is a complete set that has all the features of an old bath and includes different sections such as bineh, sarbineh, hothouse, treasury, privat parts, ton storage (bath fuel tank), water and sewage system. It dates back to the Safavid era, but parts of it were annexed to the building during the Zand era, and in fact is the oldest bath left in the city of Saqqez and one of the oldest hammams in Kurdistan province.

The interior of the bath, like most historic baths, has a limestone cover with a variety of motifs, including hunting scenes, winged angels, and geometric motifs. The framing and lime of the roof and walls and the carving of the columns are the decorations of the building. The columns of the bath are made of stone and are three pieces and are octagonal. Skylights in the center of each dome direct outside light into the bathroom environment.

== Gallery ==
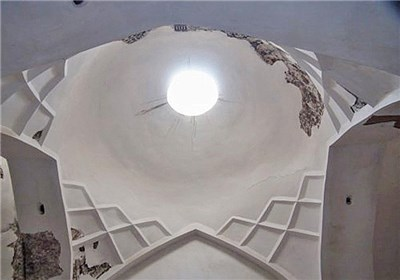
Interior of the dome

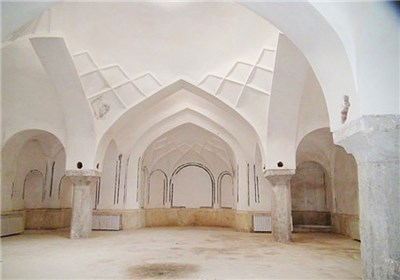
interior view

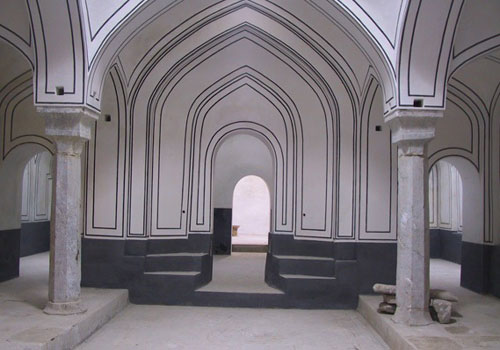
Interior view from another angle

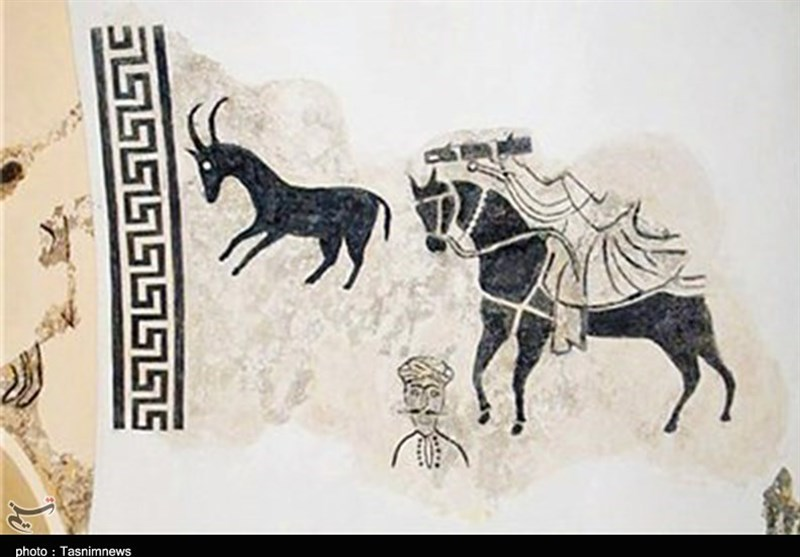
Paintings on the wall

== See also ==
- Iran National Heritage List
