= Muracan =

Muracan was a Median-Mannaean dynasty which ruled in parts of southeastern Anatolia. It was subdued by the Artaxiads.

According to tradition, they were descendants of Astyages.
