= Matiene =

Ancient kingdom in northwestern Iran

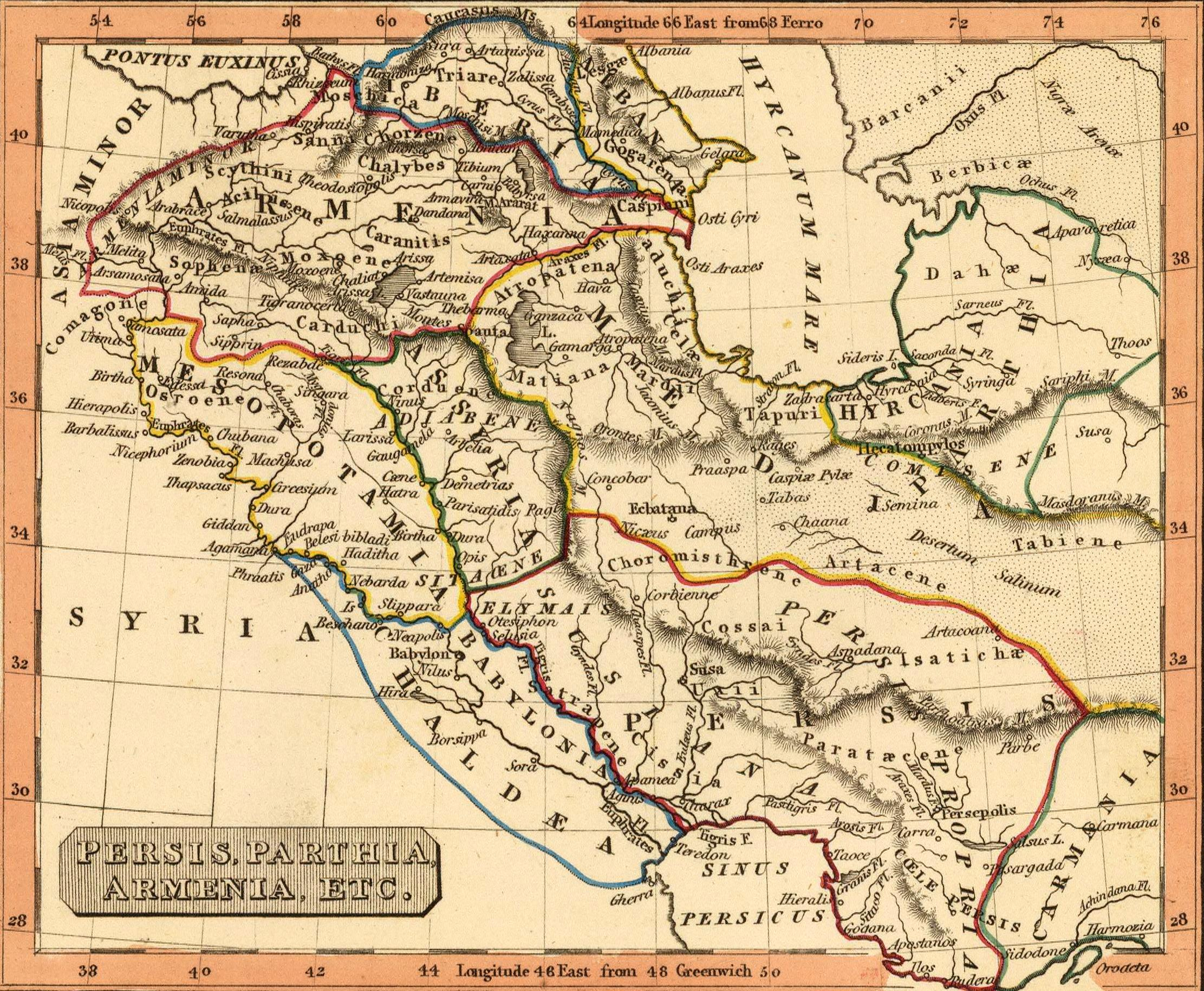
Location of Matiene, between Corduene and Atropatene

Matiene was the name of a kingdom in northwestern Iran on the lands of the earlier kingdom of the Mannae. Ancient historians including Strabo, Ptolemy, Herodotus, Polybius, and Pliny mention names such as Mantiane, Martiane, Matiana, Matiani, Matiene, Martuni to designate a region located to the northwest of Media."

== Etymology ==
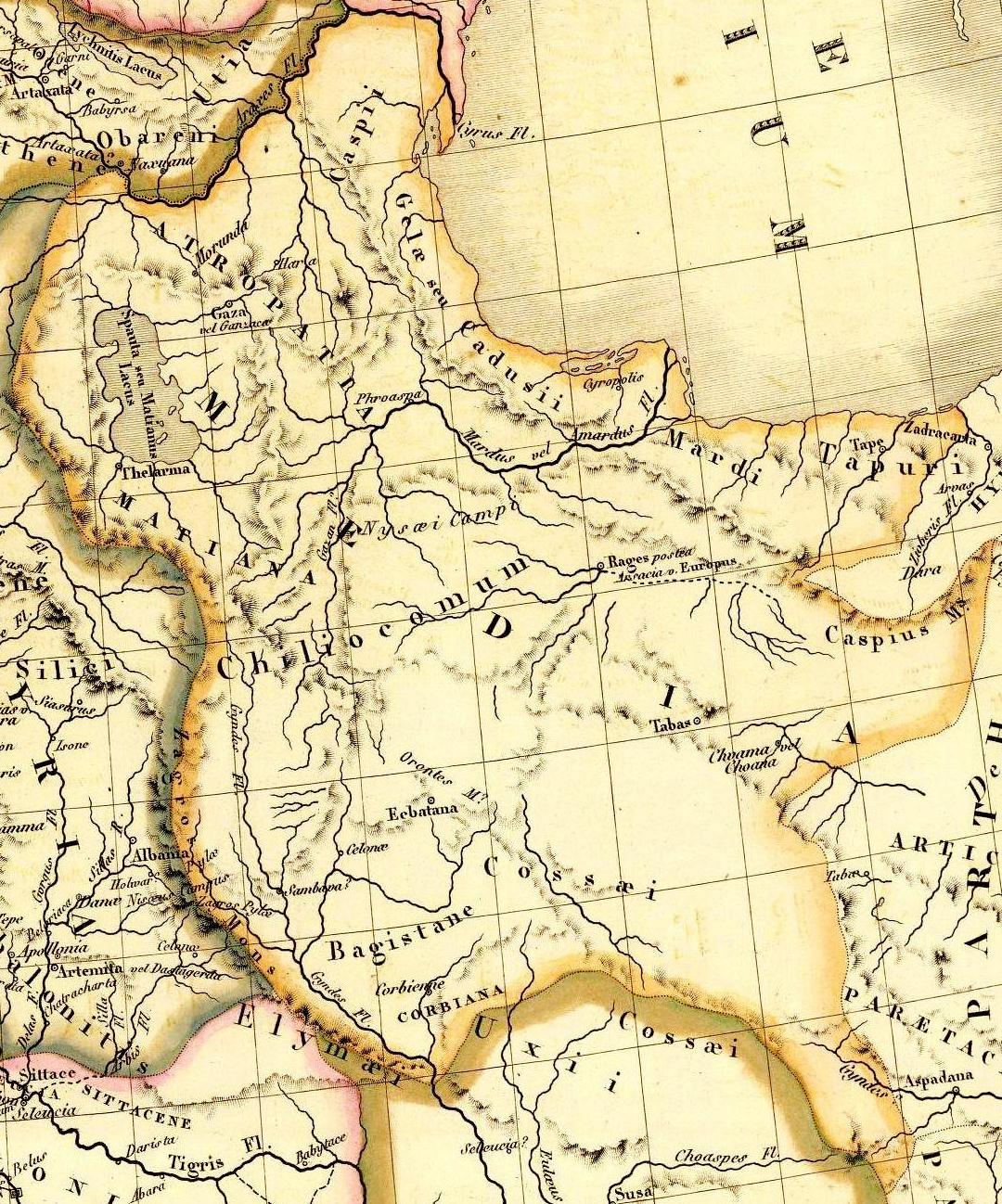
Location of Matiene

The name Matiene may be related to Mitanni, the name of a state some 800 years earlier, which was founded by an Indo-Aryan ruling class governing the Hurrian population. The name Matiene was applied also to the neighboring Lake Matianus (Lake Urmia) located immediately to the east of the Matieni people. The Iranian root "Mati-" meaning "to tower, to stand out" (from the same Indo-European root that gives us the word "mountain") might explain the name.

== History ==
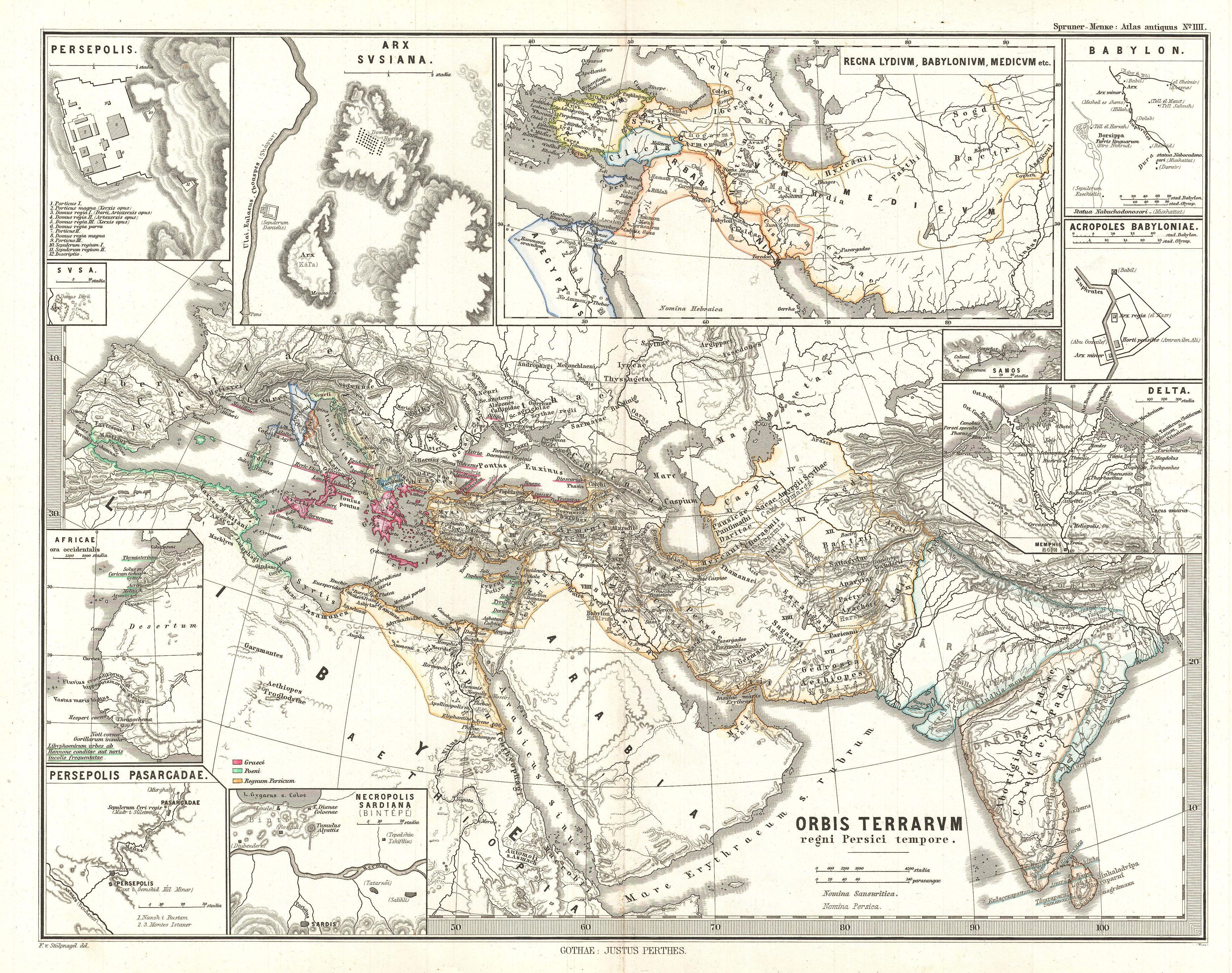
Location of Matiene, south of Armenia

The Mannaeans who probably spoke a Hurro-Urartian language, were subdued by the Scytho-Kimmerians during the seventh and eighth centuries BC and assimilated by Matienes. Matiene was ultimately conquered by the Medes in about 609 BCE.

Matiene became a satrapy of the Median Empire until the Persian conquest, when along with tribes of Saspires and Alaradians (remnants of Urartians) it became a part of the XVIII satrapy of the Achaemenid Empire.

== Geography and population ==
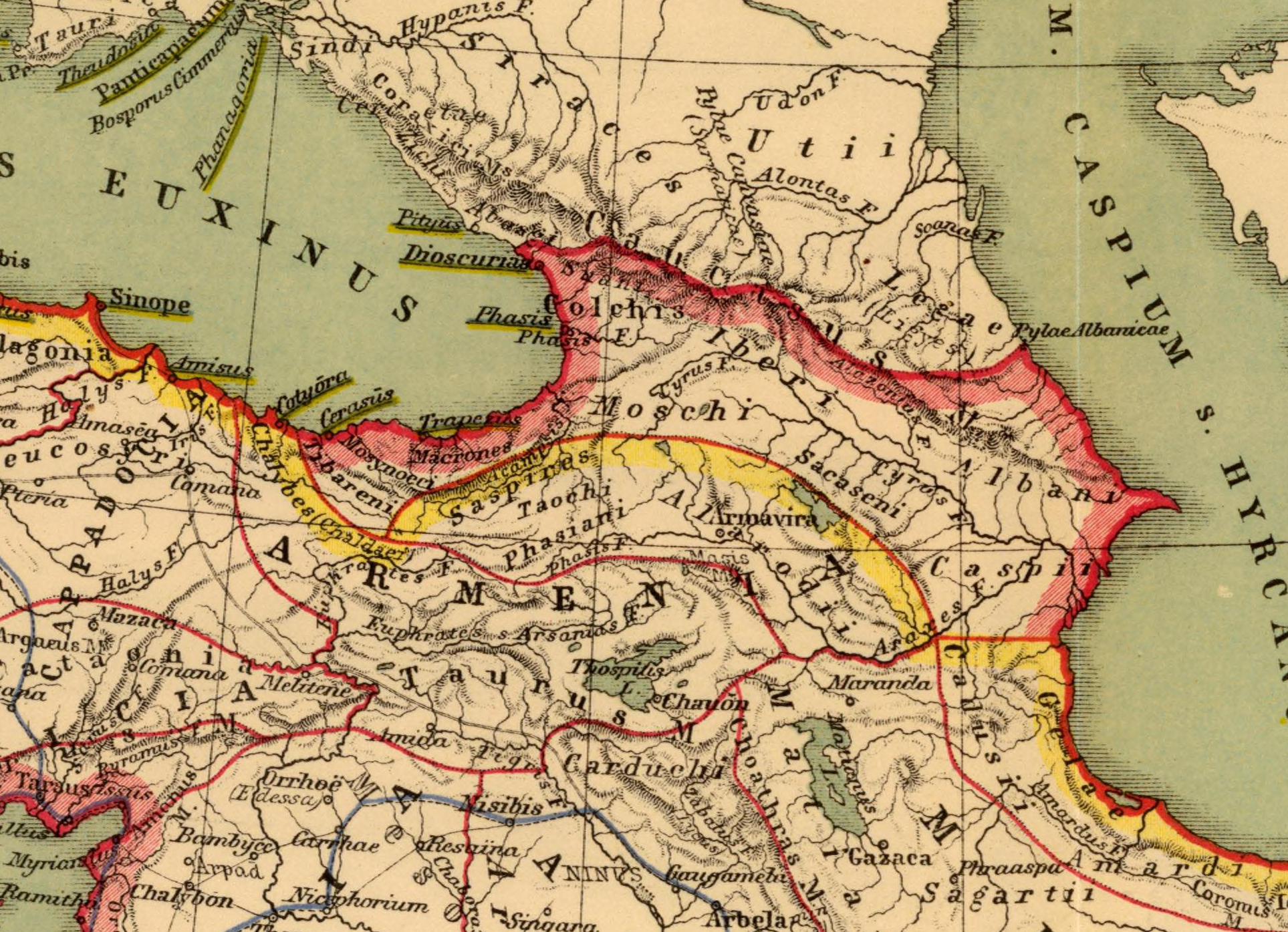
Location of Matiene, west of Lake Urmia

The land of Matiene was surrounded to the north by Armenia, to the east by Media, to the south by Susiana, and to the west by Assyria. Its chief city was Matiati around Lake Van.

It is believed that the population of Matiene were speaking a Hurro-Urartian language. Known descendants of the kings(chieftains) of the matian tribes was Armenian princely (naxarar) family of Amatuni

Cimmerians were said to have originated from the Matiani by Herodotus, moving west into Anatolia along the south shore of the Black Sea. Herodotus also said that later, in Median times, there was a second site called Matiene, along the eastern shore of the Halys river in northwestern Cappadocia across the river from the Phrygians. He stated they wore the same uniform as the Paphlagonians in the Median and Persian armies, meaning their units were combined with the Paphlagonians. It is not at all clear whether these western Matieni were descendants of the Cimmerians, a group of Paphlagonians just called by this name, actual (eastern) Matieni who migrated west from Matiene on their own, or a Median military colony on the border with Phrygia and later the Lydian empire.
