= Karaftu Caves =

Natural and man-made caves in Kurdistan province, Iran

- Karaftu Cave
- Interactive map of Karaftu Caves
- Location: Kurdistan province, Iran
- Coordinates: 36.2667°N 46.8500°E
- Discovery: 1940 (National Monument registration)
- Features: Greek inscription, rock-cut architecture
- Registry: UNESCO Tentative World Heritage Site (2022)

Iran National Heritage List
- Official name: Karaftu Caves
- Type: Archaeological Site
- Designated: 1940
- Reference no.: 330
- Conservation organization: Cultural Heritage, Handicrafts and Tourism Organization of Iran

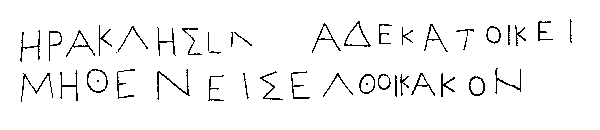
The Greek Seleucid era inscription found at the cave ensemble: "ʿĒraklēs [ʾenth]ade katoikei, mēthen eiselthoi kakon" "This is the House of Herakles. Whoever enters is safe”

The Karaftu Caves (Note: Also spelled "Karafto".) (Persian: کرفتو; Kurdish: کەرەفتوو), also known as Karaftu Castle, are a mixture of natural and human-made caverns located on a mountainous terrain between Saqqez and Divandarreh, Kurdistan province, Iran. The limestone caves, situated at an altitude of approximately 2,000 m and stretching over 750 m, were formed naturally, but were modified by inhabitants over the centuries.

== Description ==
The caves were formed during the Mesozoic Era. Once underwater, over time, water erosion shaped its walls and ceilings. They are notable for their speleothems.

Set in the side of a large cliff, the caves have four floors with nested rooms connected by corridors and stairs. They have been inhabited from Seleucid era until Islamic era.

== Inscriptions and rock art ==
The most outstanding section of the troglodytic architecture is the third floor, where there has been made special accuracy in carving rooms and ceilings.

Among the most significant archaeological finds are prehistoric rock art featuring human, animal, plant, and geometric patterns and, alongside the Statue of Hercules in Behistun, one of the few extant Seleucid rock-cut artworks preserved in situ in Iran.

== UNESCO ==
The caves were registered as one of Iran's national monuments on 10 February 1940, with registration number 330. Also, they were registered as UNESCO's Tentative World Site as per 15 November 2022.

== Gallery ==
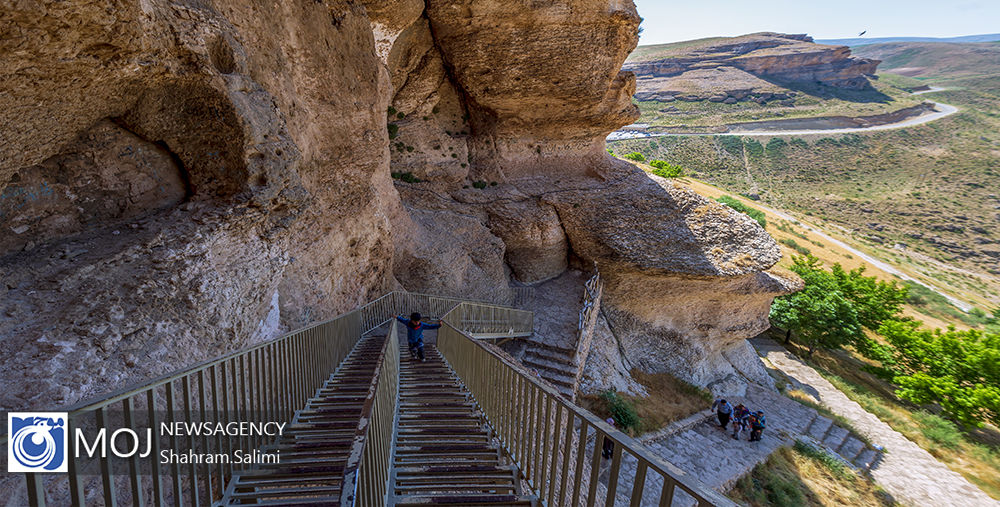

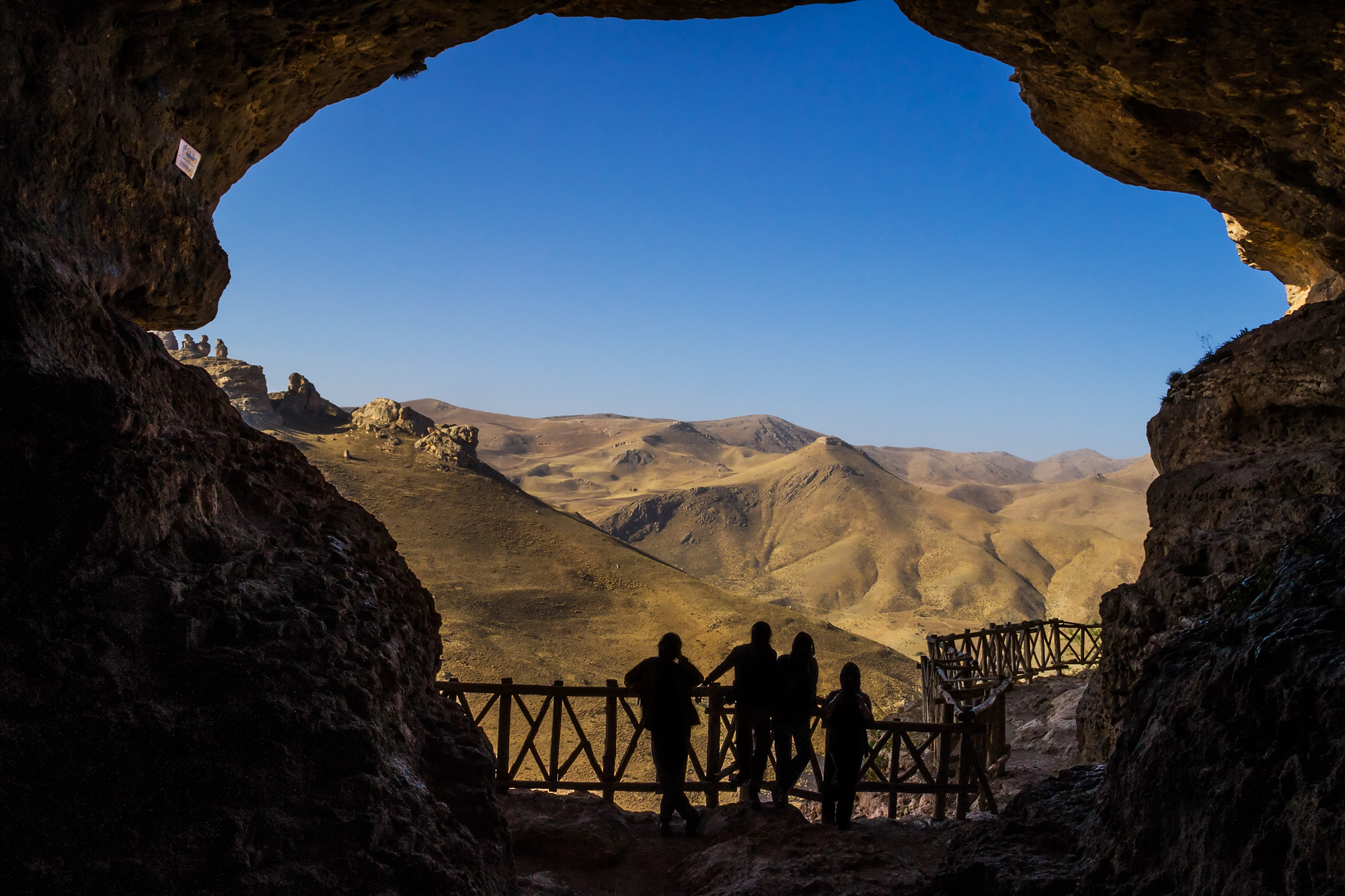

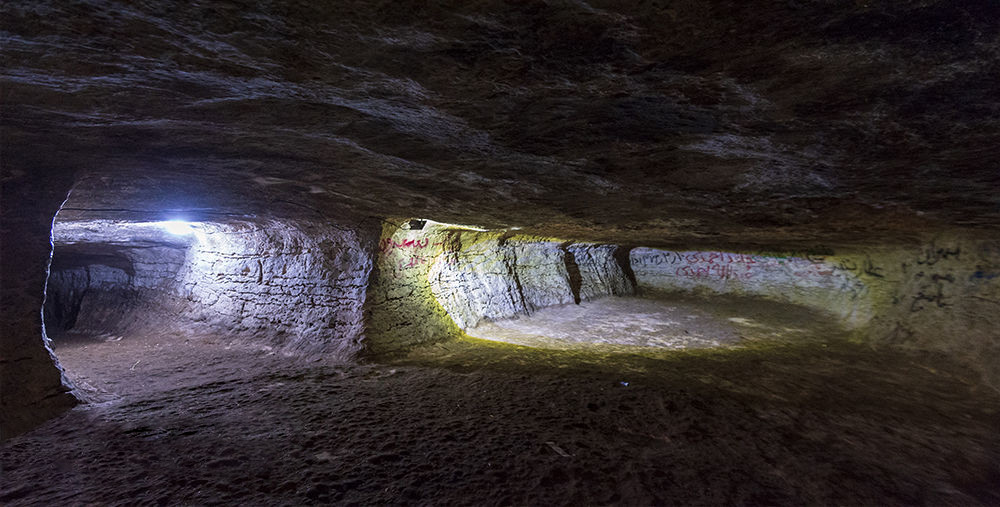

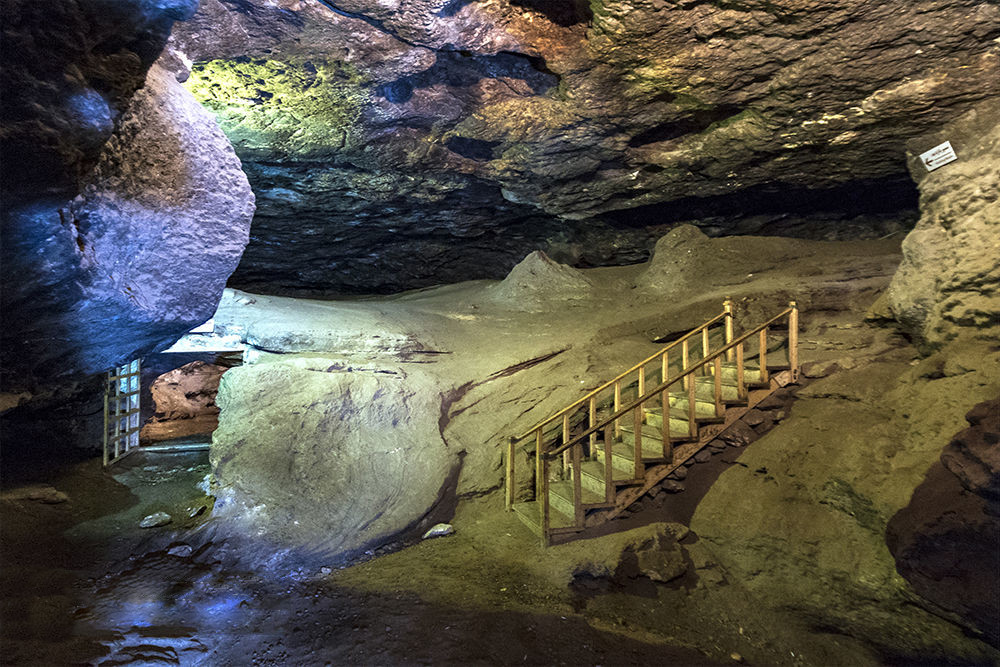

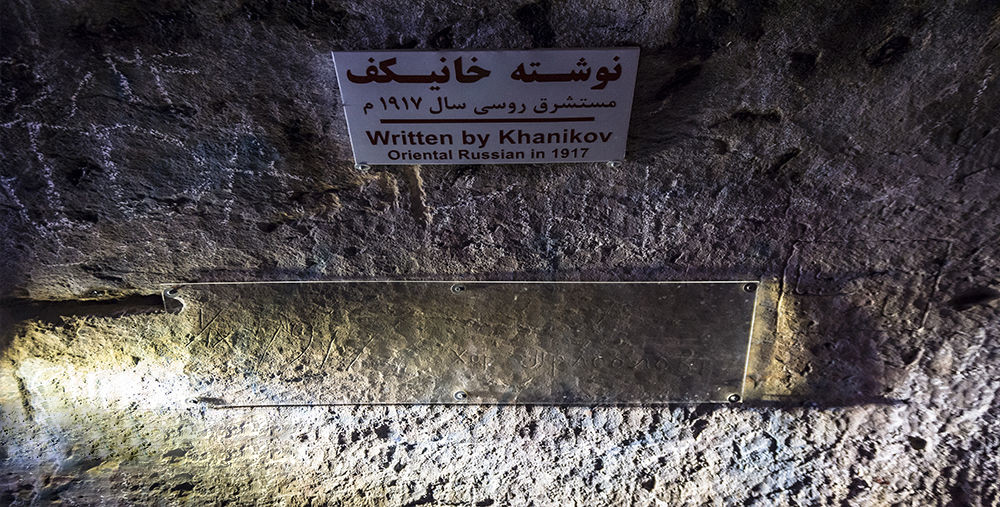
Graffiti by Russian orientalist Khanikov mentioning his visit to the cave in 1917

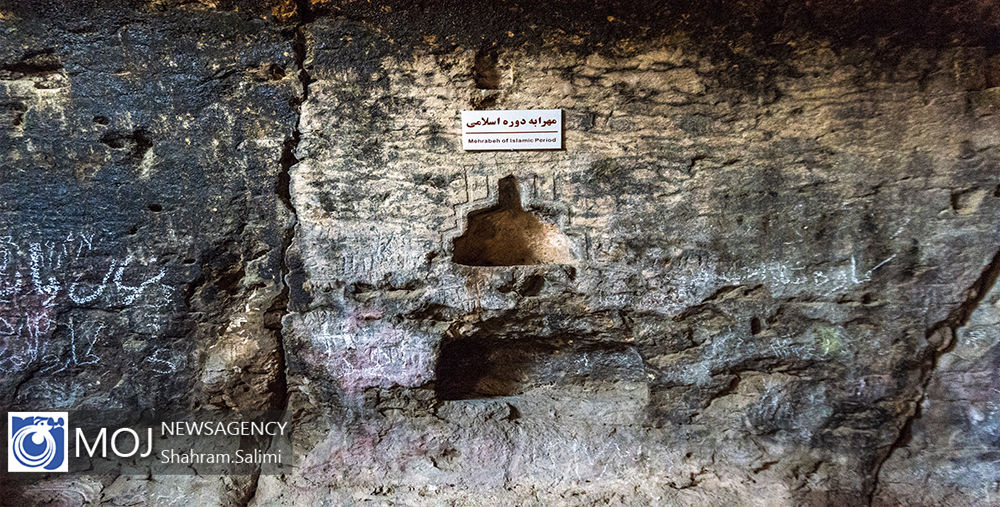
Rock qibla

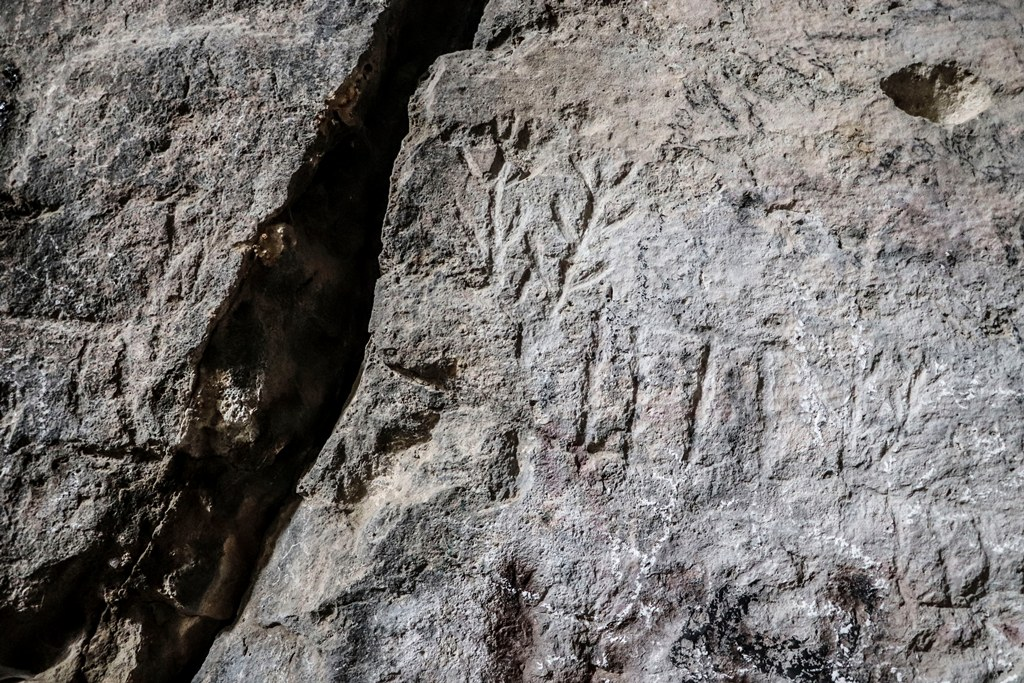
Rock art

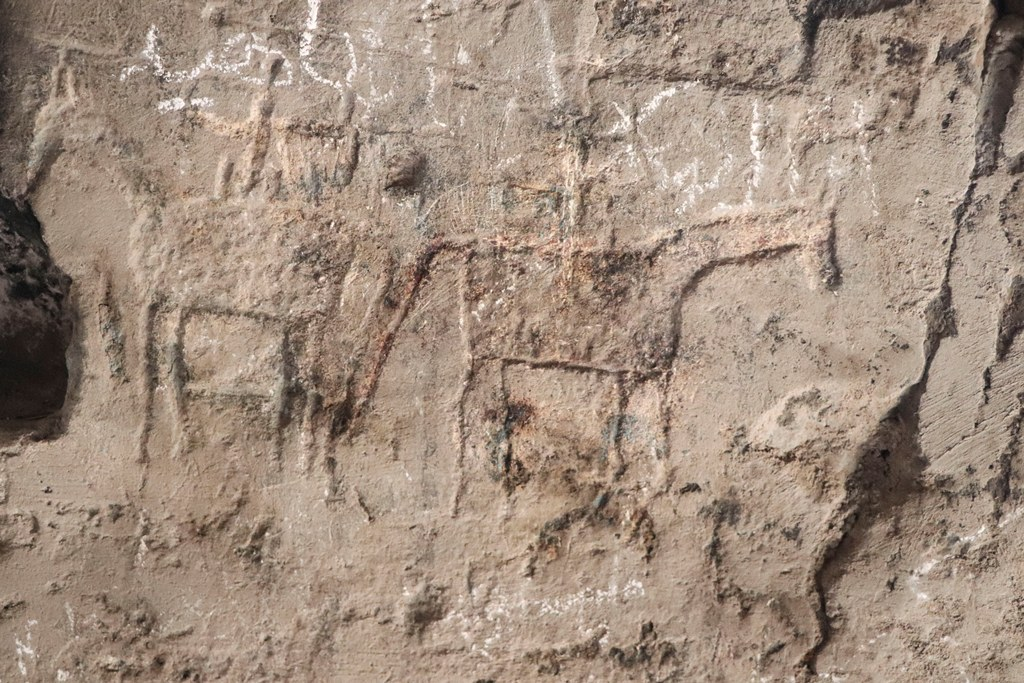
Rock art
