= Kurdish International Theater Festival =

The International Kurdish Theater Festival فیستیڤاڵی نێونەتەوەیی شانۆی کوردی
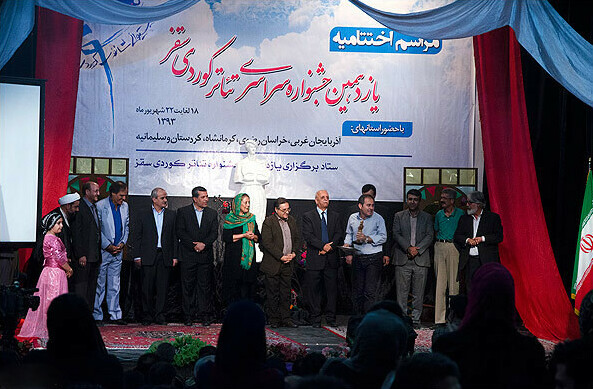
- 11th Kurdish Theater Festival, in 2014
- Begins: December
- Ends: December
- Frequency: Annual
- Locations: Saqqez, Iran
- Inaugurated: 1999
- Participants: Professional Theater groups from Iran and other countries

The International Kurdish Theater Festival is the most important theater festival in the Kurdish regions of Iran, Rojhalat, which has been held in Saqqez city, since December 1999, with the participation of professional theater groups from different parts of Iran and abroad. So far, 16 periods of this festival have been held, the last of which was on December 19–22, 2019. This festival is organized by the Ministry of Culture and Islamic Guidance of Iran.

== ‌History ==
The Kurdish Theater Festival was founded in the early 90's and started its activities in the late 90's by solving various problems along the way. By holding different periods of this festival, it was finally promoted to a well-known position among different segments of the people in the Kurdish provinces as well as among Iranian theater artists. The first Kurdish Theater Festival was held in 1999 and the last in 2019. It is now more than twenty years since the first Saqqez Kurdish Theater Festival was held, and the performance of this cultural and artistic event has been accompanied by many ups and downs during these years. After holding 6 periods during the years 1999 to 2004, the process of holding it stopped, but from 2008 this cultural and artistic event started again and continued until 2011, then it was closed and from 2014 the 11th period of this festival was held and Until 2019, the 16th edition of this festival was held. To hold the 17th edition of the festival, after the COVID-19 pandemic, the Ministry of Culture and Islamic Guidance needs to allocate a budget line.

== Festival awards ==
These awards include the following:

- Festival statue
- Special Director Award
- Special Award for Male Acting
- Special Award for Actress
- Special Scene Design Award
- Special poster design award
- Special Music Award

and some other award and cash prizes

== Results of recent festivals ==
=== The 17th edition of the festival ===
In this period, 40 works, including 21 foreign works and 19 domestic works, were sent to the secretariat of the 17th festival, and the panel of reviewers selected 10 works for the competition section. This course was delayed due to the Covid19 pandemic. The 17th edition of the festival, which was supposed to be held in November 2021, was changed several times due to the spread of Covid19, and finally, on May 13, 2022, it started its work with the performance of "Wall". In this period, Behrouz Gharibpour from Sanandaj, Hamidreza Naimi from Ilam and Goran Ali from Sulaymaniyah, Kurdistan region of Iraq, were judges of the festival. During this period, the works "Siyasal" and "Azhal" were selected for introduction to national and international festivals:

- Special award for best stage design: festival statuette, diploma of honor and cash prize to the stage designers of the work "Azhal" and certificate of appreciation to Afshin Khodri in the work "Hari"
- Special award for best music: statue of the festival, diploma of honor and cash prize to Mirza Metin for composing the work "Mehm and Zain" and certificate of appreciation and cash prize to Kosha Najarzadeh for composing the work "Siyasal"
- Special award for best playwriting: statue of the festival, diploma of honor and cash prize for Parviz Ahmadi, author of the work "Siyasal" and plaque of appreciation and cash prize for Hadi Bahrami, author of the work "Courage and Truth"
- Special award for best director: festival statuette, diploma of honor and cash prize to Farzad Hasan Mirazi for directing the work "Azhal" and certificate of appreciation and cash prize to Parviz Ahmadi director of the work "Siyasal"
- Special award for best actress: festival statuette, diploma of honor and cash prize to Samaneh Mirzaei in the work "The Farthest Shari Jihan" and certificate of appreciation and cash prize jointly to Nermin Salahi, the actress of the works "Courage and Truth" and Azin Haji Mirzaei in the work "Hari"
- Special award for best actor: festival statuette, diploma of honor and cash prize to Aziz Saeedenjad in the work "Azhal" and a certificate of appreciation and cash prize jointly to Dariush Rafati in the work "Siyasal" and "Ferman Mahmoud" in the work "Gejan"

=== The 16th edition of the festival ===
During this period, nine theater groups from Iran and two foreign theater groups succeeded in showing their works. The play "Ahki Nishtmani Daholik" from Turkey directed by "Ozel Tunjai" and also the play "Bauk" from Sulaimaniyah of Iraqi Kurdistan region directed by "Siddiq Aziz Bavan" were present in this festival as foreign groups.

- Special award for directing "Siddiq Aziz" for the play Buck from Sulaymaniyah, Iraq
- Special Award for Actress to Ms. "Khe Roman" for her role in the play Bauk from Sulaymaniyah
- Special Award for Best Actor to زلzel Tünjai for his performance at the Academy in Istanbul, Turkey
- Special Award for Best Actor to "Shah Mal Abe Rahsh" for his performance in the book "Bawk" from Sulaimaniyah, Iraq
- Special male acting award to "Peyman Babaian" for his performance in the legend of the tiger from Mahabad

=== The 15th edition of the festival ===
This period of the festival was held from 1 to 5 December 2018 and the secretary of this period was Ghotbeddin Sadeghi. During this period, 69 theater groups sent the text of the play and the CD of their performance to the secretariat of the Saqqez Kurdish Theater Festival, which included 14 plays from Syrian Kurdistan or Rojava, Iraqi Kurdistan or Bashour and Turkish Kurdistan or Bakour. Selected works by the jury:

- "Kacheh Se Talikeh" directed by Fateh Badparva from Marivan
- "He Nari" directed by Qutbuddin Sadeghi from Sanandaj
- "We all are fine" directed by Saman Mehran and Farzad Hassan Mirzaei from Baneh
- The play "in front of hell Door" from Sulaymaniyah, Iraqi Kurdistan

== Gallery ==
Photos of 16th edition of the festival

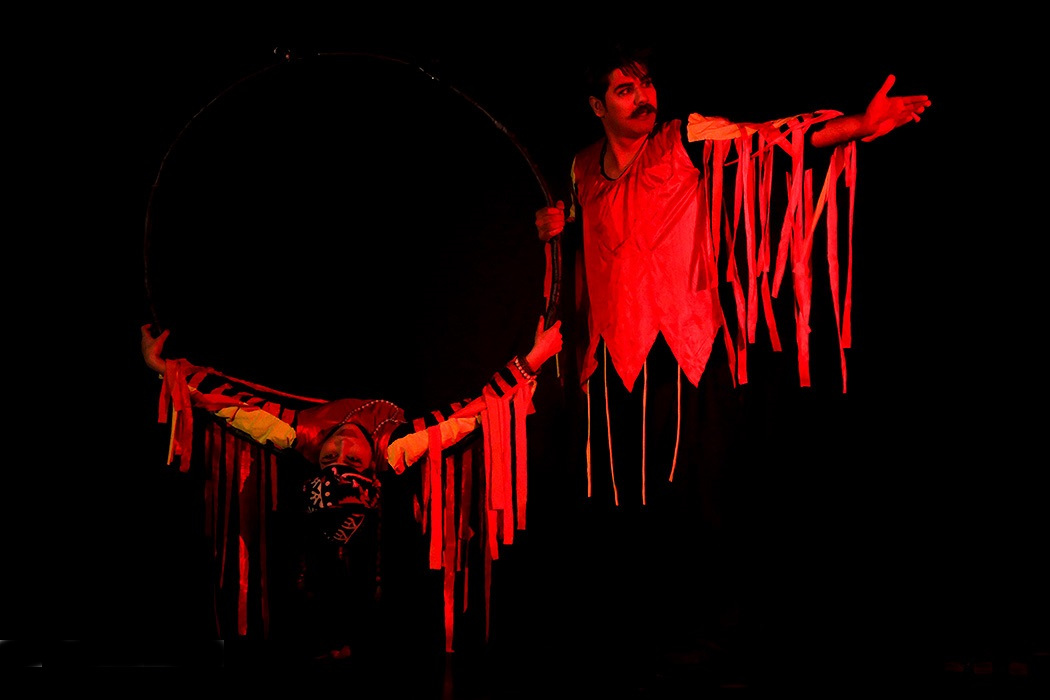

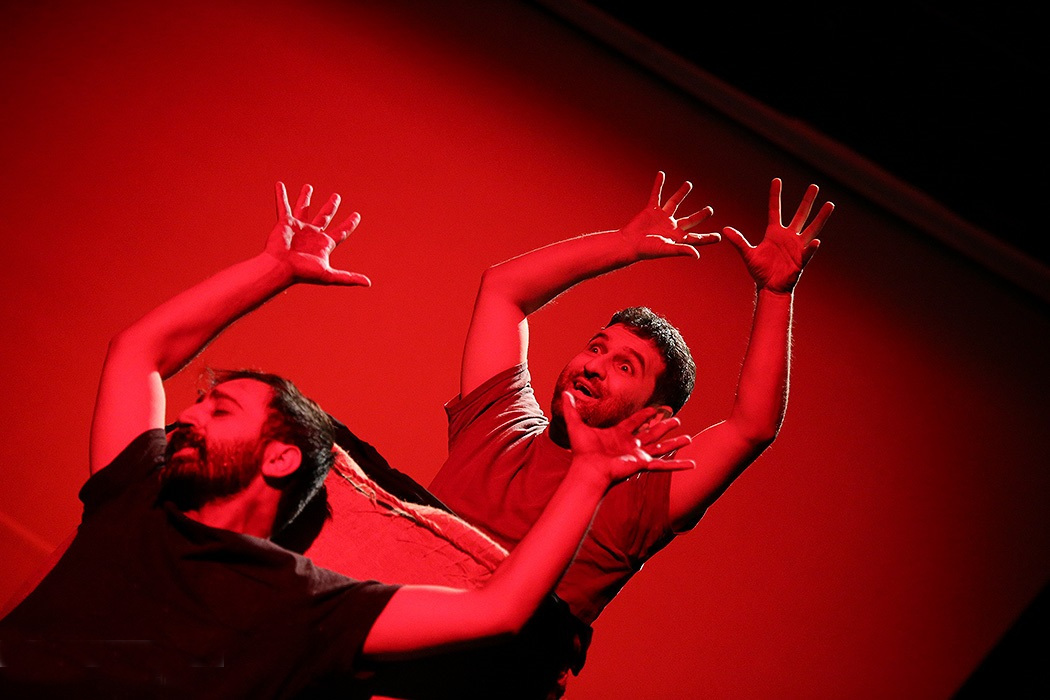

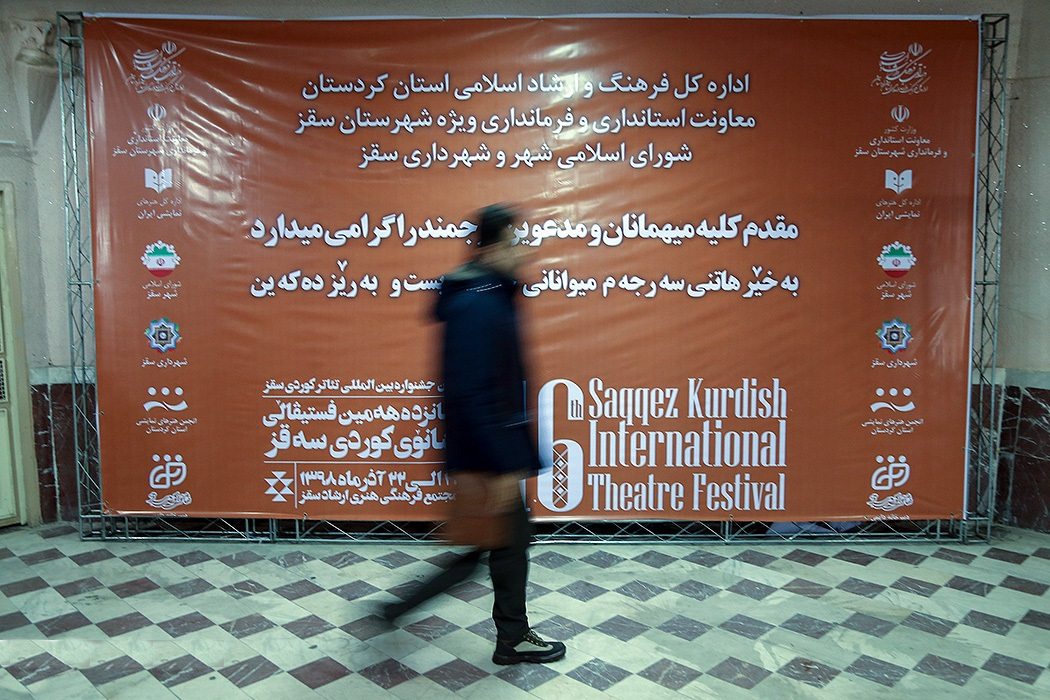

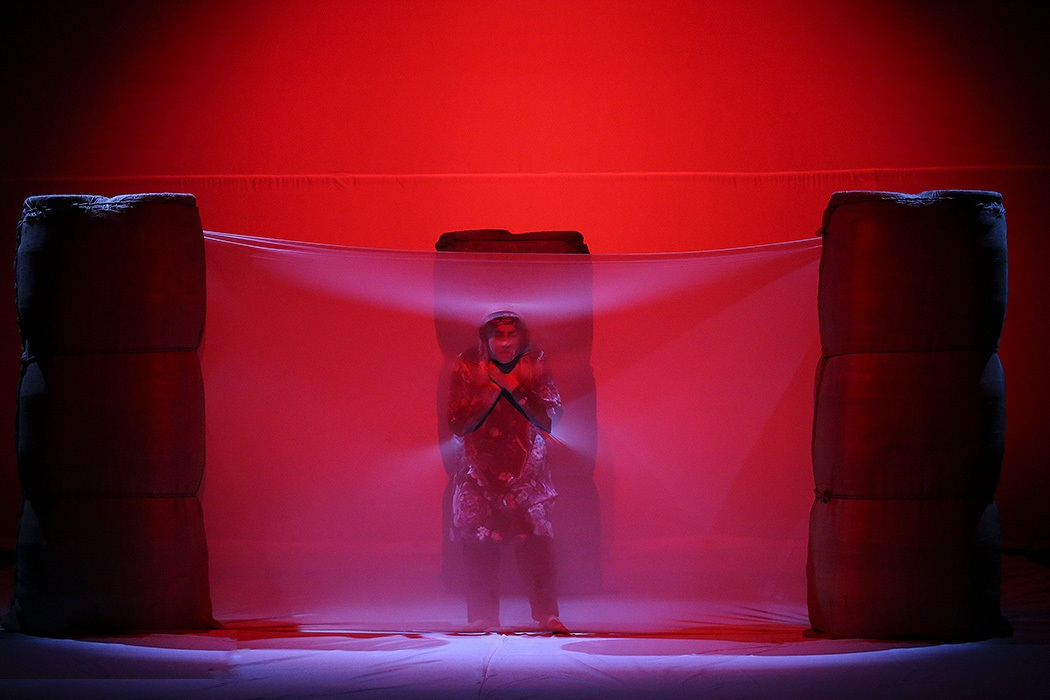

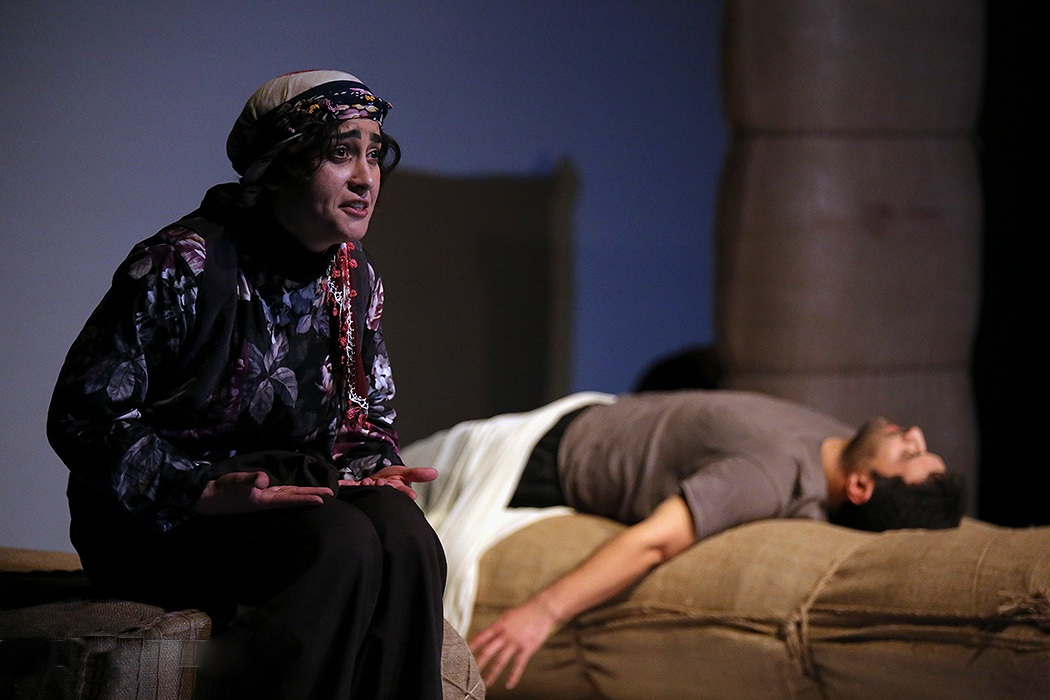

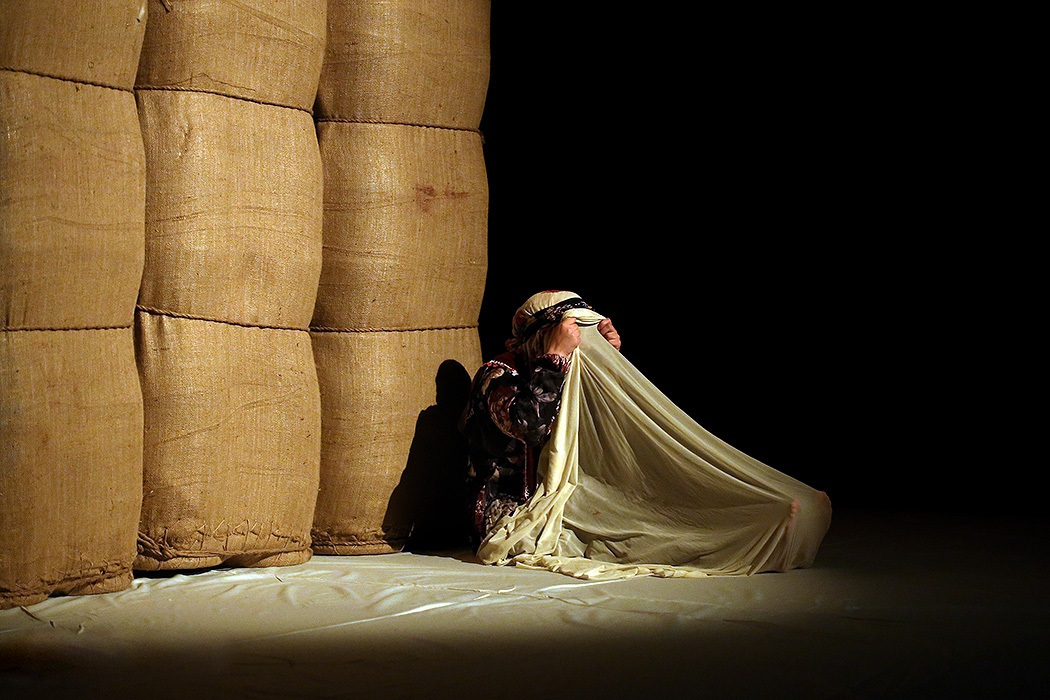

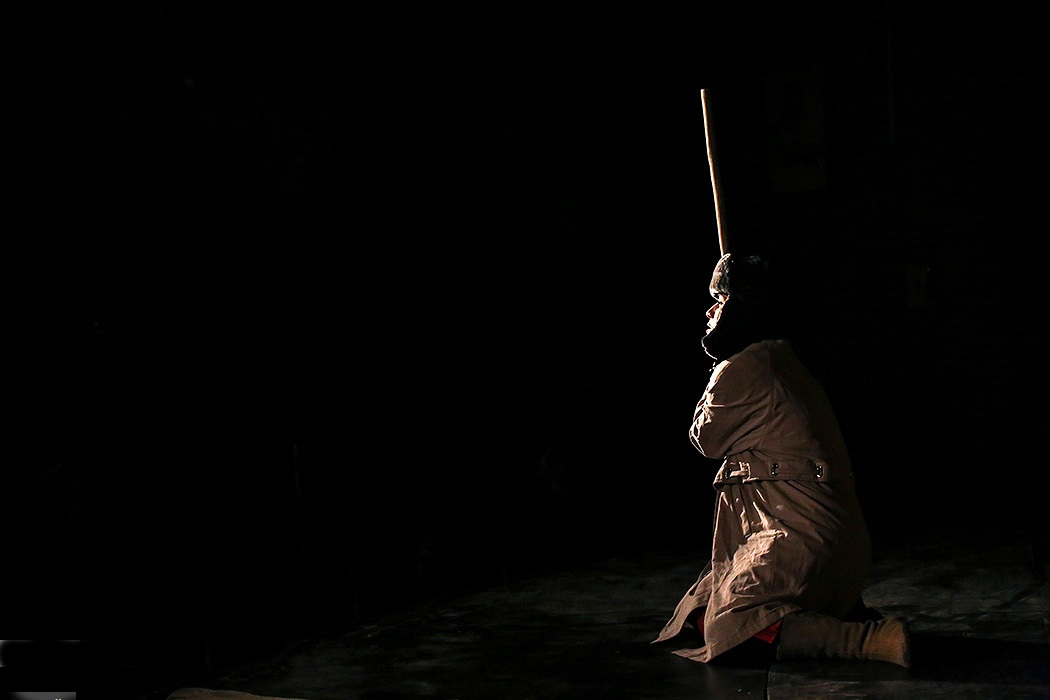

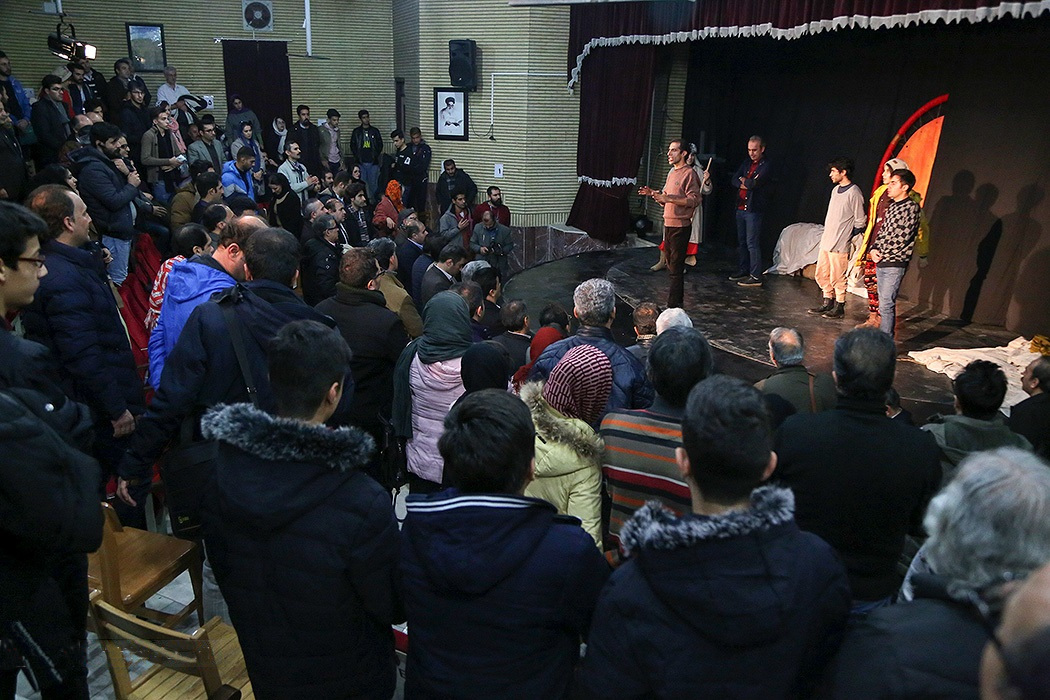
Photos of 11th edition of the festival

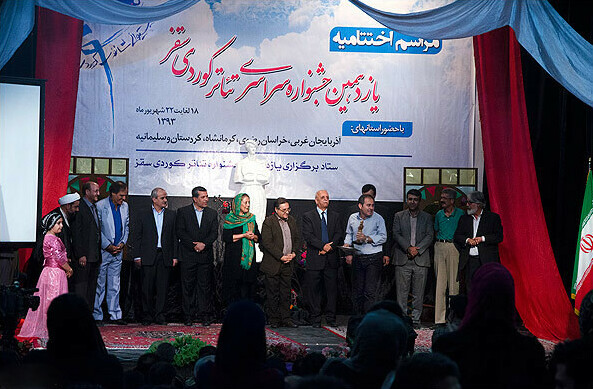

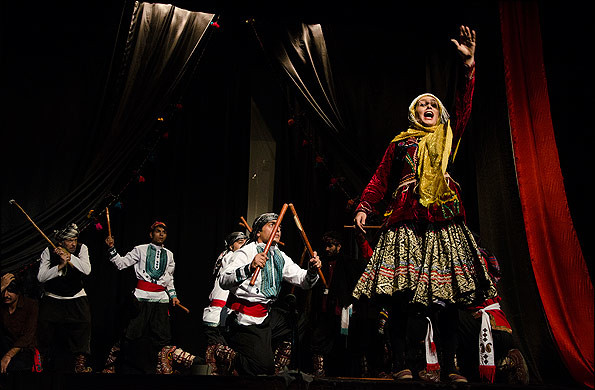

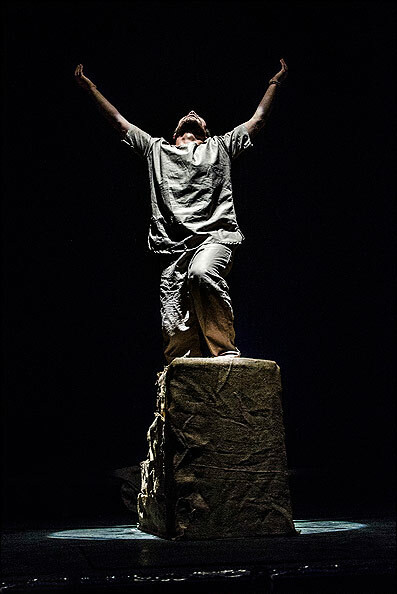

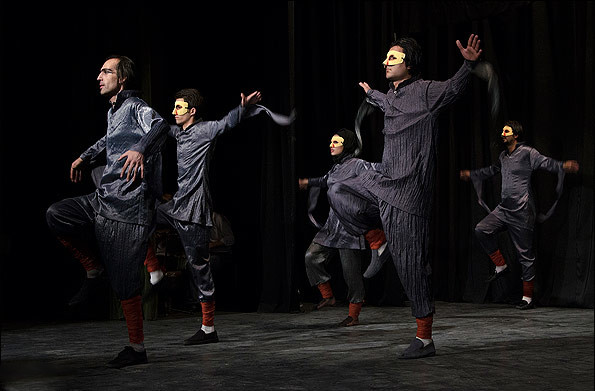

== See also ==
- Kurdish Theatre in Turkey
