= Domenareh Mosque =

Mosque in Saqqez, Kurdistan, Iran

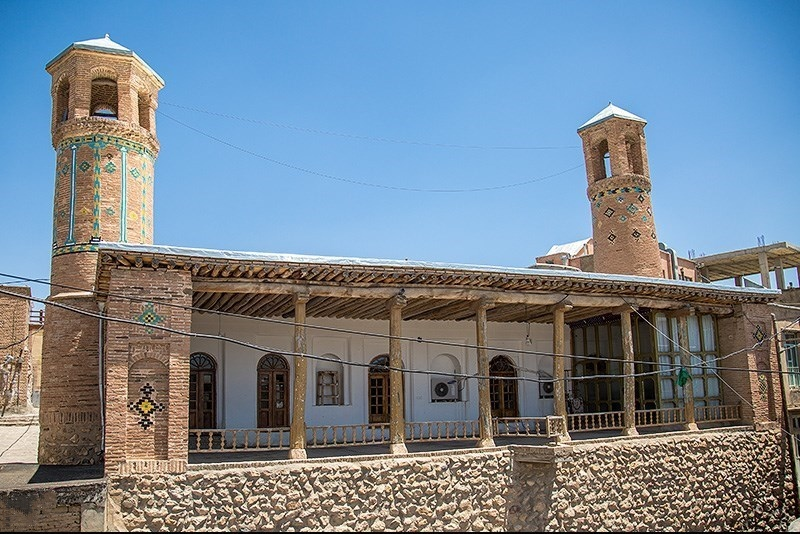
- The mosque exterior in 2019

- Location of the mosque in Iran

Religion
- Affiliation: Sunni Islam
- Ecclesiastical or organisational status: Mosque
- Status: Active

Location
- Location: Saqqez, Kurdistan province
- Country: Iran
- Coordinates: 36°23′55″N 46°26′55″E

Architecture
- Type: Mosque architecture
- Style: Islamic
- Founder: Sheikh Hassen Molanabad
- Completed: 1700 CE

Specifications
- Dome: Two
- Minaret: Two
- Materials: Raw clay; bricks; mortar; tiles; timber; rubble

Iran National Heritage List
- Official name: Domenareh Mosque
- Type: Built
- Designated: 15 March 2000
- Reference no.: 2600
- Conservation organization: Cultural Heritage, Handicrafts and Tourism Organization of Iran

The Domenareh Mosque (Sorani Kurdish: مزگەوتی دوومنارە; Persian: مسجد دومناره, lit. 'Two Minaret Mosque') is a mosque, located in Saqqez, Kurdistan province, Iran. It is one of the oldest mosques in Saqqez as well as Kurdistan, surviving in its original form. The mosque was completed during the Afsharid and early Zand eras.

The mosque was added to the Iran National Heritage List on 15 March 2000, administered by the Cultural Heritage, Handicrafts and Tourism Organization of Iran.

== History ==
According to local traditions, the mosque dates from the time of Sheikh Hassan Molanabad, a famous mystic and mathematician of the Afsharid era. When Nader Shah left for Baghdad, he passed through Saqqez and at the request of Sheikh Hassan Molanabad to build a mosque for the people of that city, Nader Shah ordered the construction of this mosque in the old part of Saqqez. Even now, some locals call this mosque Sheikh Hassan Molanabad Mosque. One of the signs and reasons for the validity of this claim is that in this journey, Nader Shah also gives two inlays and a beautiful painted leather tablecloth as a gift to Sheikh Hassan. These gifts are currently kept in the village of Molanabad, where Sheikh Hassan's tomb is located. There is also a Manuscript Quran in the tomb of Sheikh Hassan, which dates back to the late Afsharid era.

== Architecture ==
The mosque has an almost square plan. In its construction, materials such as raw clay, mud mortar, carcasses, bricks and wood have been used. The entrance of this mosque is located on the west side. At the entrance, it has a brick door with a Chinese knot texture of yellow bricks and tiles; Which represents the Zand era. After the entrance, there is a corridor of approximately 3 by 3.5 metres (9.8 by 11.5 ft), from which the roof of the mosque can be reached by nine steps.

== Gallery ==
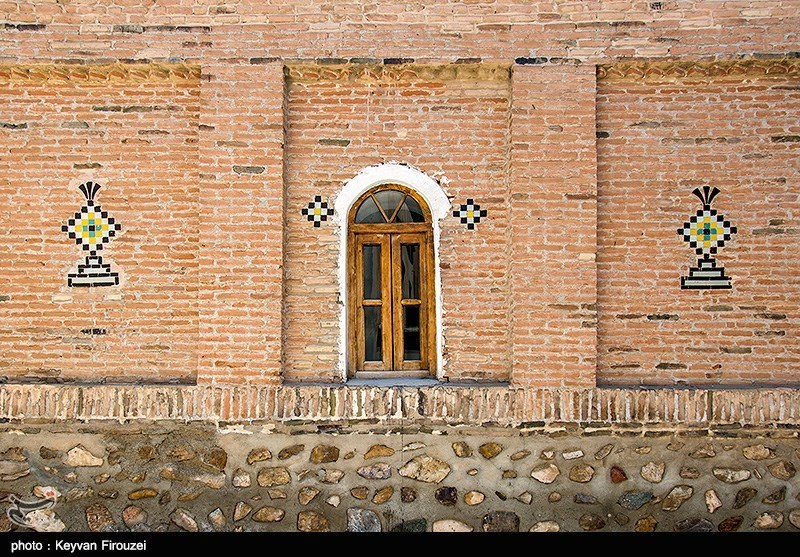
Wall view

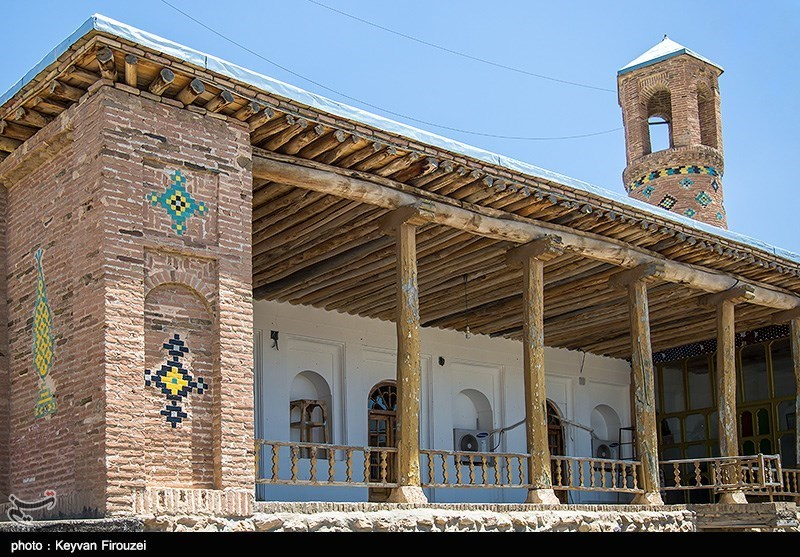
Mosque porch from outside

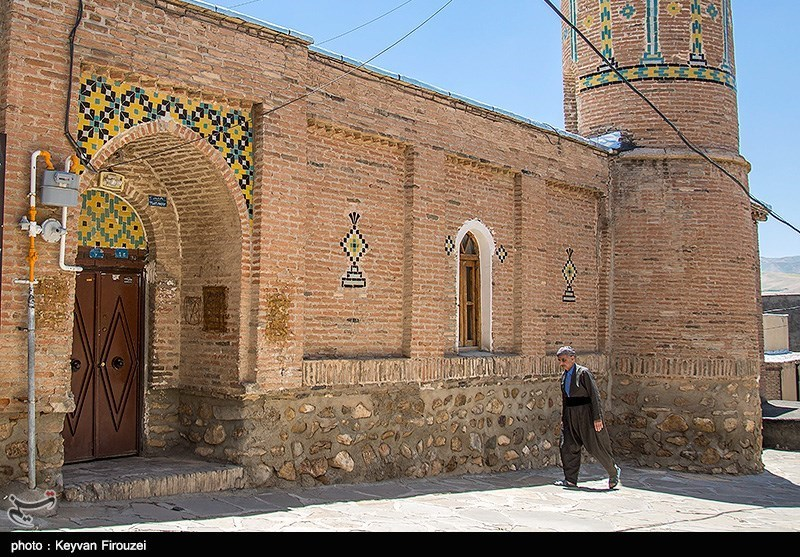
The door of the mosque

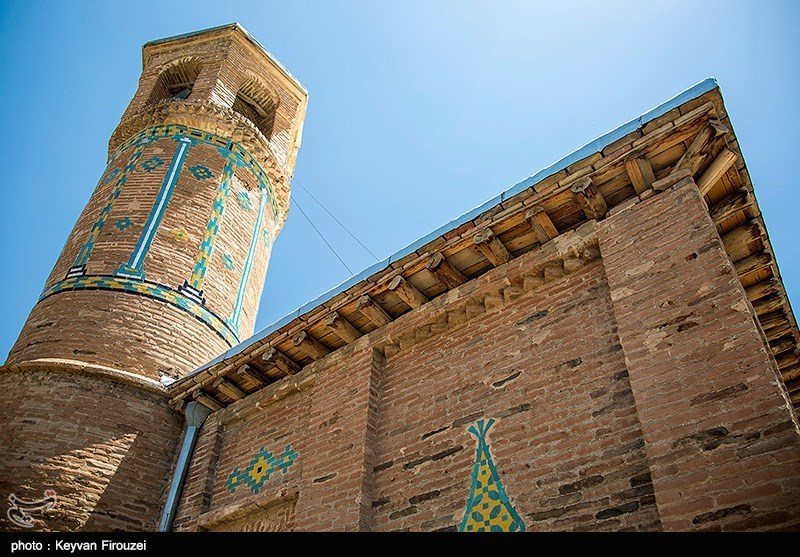
View of the minaret

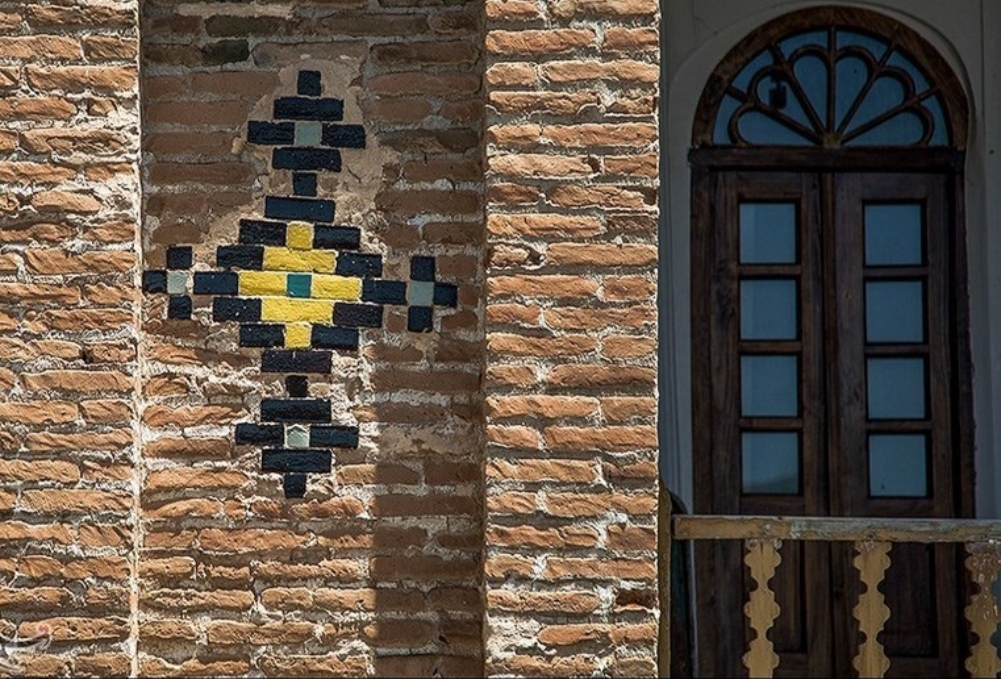
Mosque view

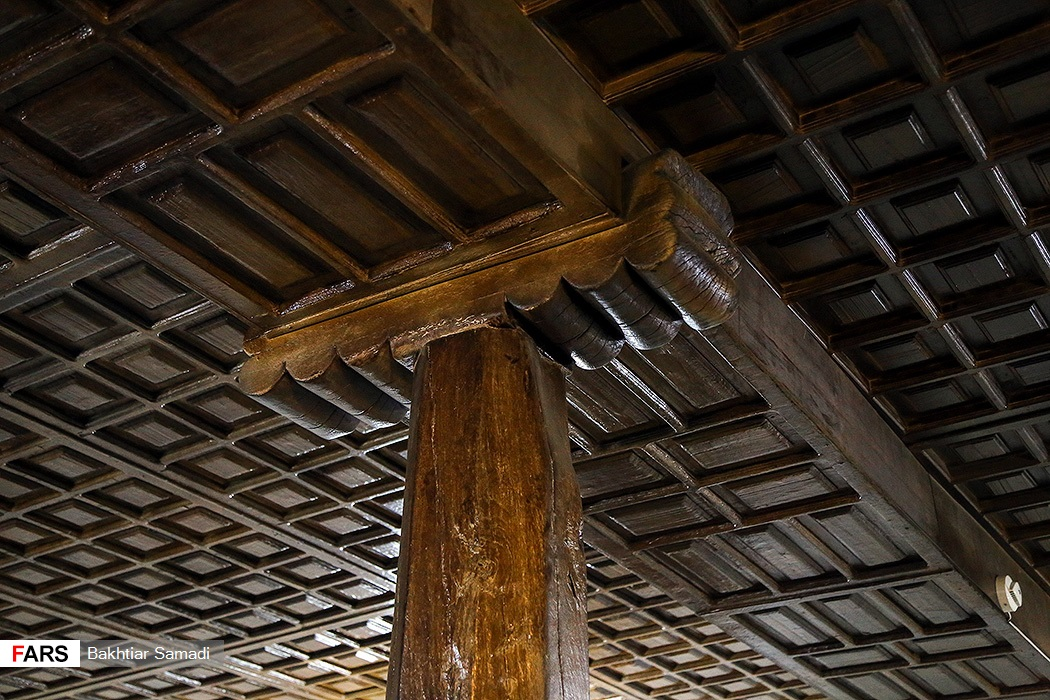
The mosque's ceiling

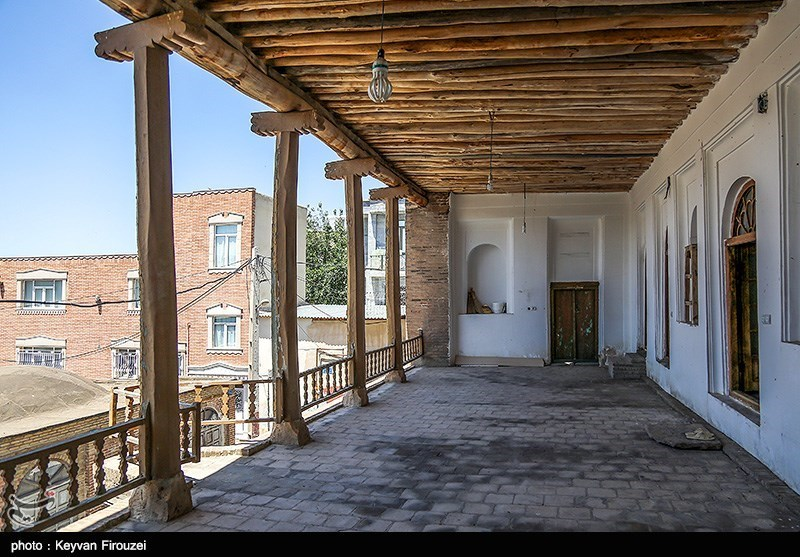
The porch of the mosque

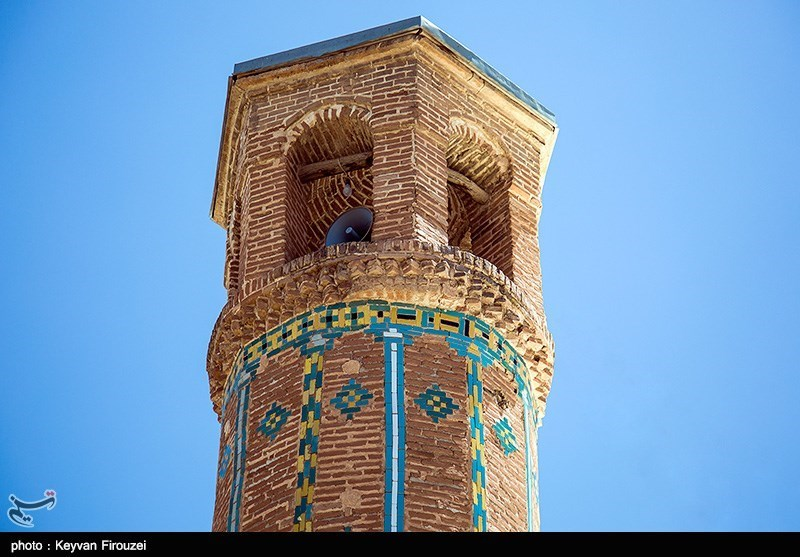
View of the minaret

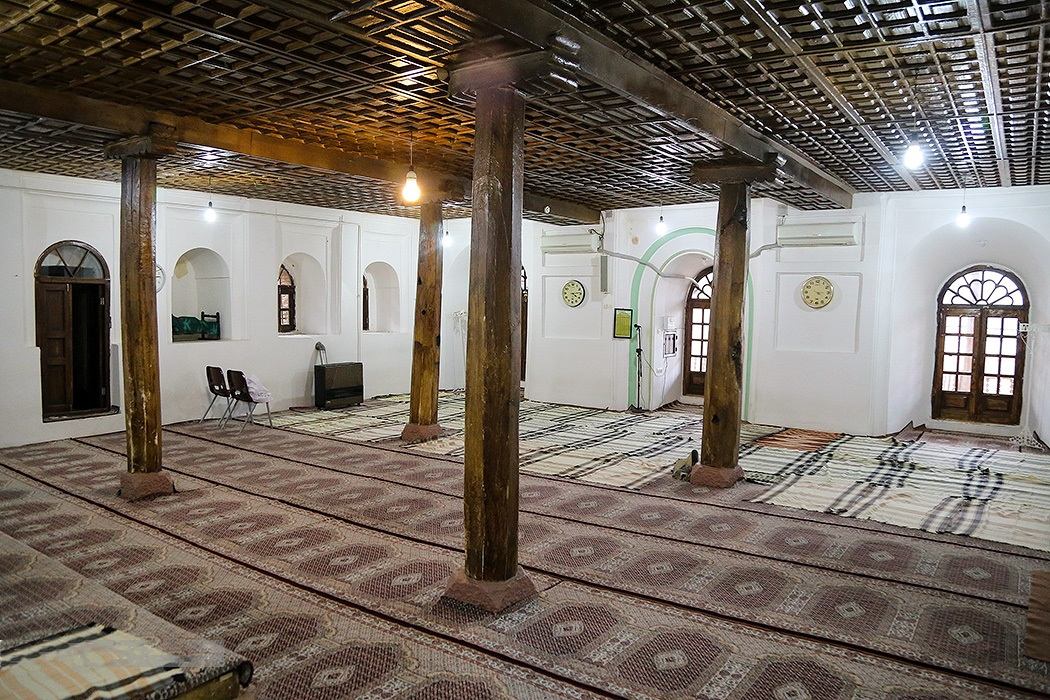
Interior of the mosque

== See Also ==
- Sunni Islam in Iran
- List of mosques in Iran
