= Izirtu =

Capital of ancient Mannaea, archaeological site

Izirtu (Persian: ایزیرتو) was the capital of the Mannai state, which existed from the 9th century BC to the 6th century BC.

== Description ==
Izirtu, Izirta, and Zirtu, the capital of the Manneans, located in the village of Qalaychi, which is situated about 7 kilometers northeast of the city of Bukan, has been referred to several times in Assyrian texts. This region has been a subject of dispute between Urartu and Assyria. Izirtu was at least the capital of Mannaea from 828 BC to the end of the 7th century BCE.

Based on the excavations and the artifacts found in this area, some archaeologists like Ehsan Yaghmaei believe that Qalaychi Hill is the same as Izirtu. One prominent aspect of Mannean art is the unparalleled finesse and beauty that is unique in contemporary civilizations. Their renowned art involved making glazed bricks, some of which have survived nearly intact for about 3000 years. A very beautiful example of these bricks can be found in the Tokyo National Museum, with approximately 400 glazed bricks discovered in this area so far, indicating the high significance of Qalaychi and likely identifying this area as the city of Zirtu or Izirtu, the capital of the Manneans.

In December 2020, 49 glazed bricks from Qalaychi Hill in Bukan were transferred from Switzerland to the National Museum of Iran. The number of bricks found from Qalaychi Bukan amounts to 450 pieces.

== Explorations in Iran ==
Between 1979 and 1985, extensive illegal excavations were carried out at the Qalaychi Hill site, located seven kilometers north of Bukan. Some unique glazed brick artifacts were discovered, quickly revealing their way to underground auction rooms and then, using private sections and foreign museums, were acquired by the Tokyo National Museum, the Tokyo Ancient East Museum, and the Middle East Cultural Center in Japan.

== Qalaychi's Relationship with Zirtu ==
In ancient Iran, numerous local governments ruled in the Zagros mountain range. Among the states that first formed governments in the future land of Media, the state of Mana can be mentioned. The center of this state is located in the southern plain of Lake Urmia. The Mana state repeatedly fought against Assyria and Urartu from the 8th century BCE and was never defeated by any of the aforementioned states.

Research and investigations have yielded artifacts from the Mana state from the southern shores of Lake Urmia. This area includes the cities of Miandoab, Baruq, Shahindezh, Takab, Malekan, Naqadeh, Oshnavieh, Piranshahr, Sardasht, Mahabad, Bukan, Baneh, and Saqqez, as well as Bijar, and according to new findings, areas from Zanjan to the vicinity of Tabriz.

== Archaeological Inspection Team ==
In 1985, an archaeological team under the supervision of Ismail Yaghmaei was sent to the Qalaychi Bukan site. During a season of archaeology at the site, many glazed and unique bricks were found, and 13 inscription lines were also discovered. Due to regional issues, this group could not continue its work in the next season, and excavations in this ancient area were suspended until a team led by Bahman Kargar, a senior cultural heritage expert in Urmia, resumed them in 1999. This team found remnants of a temple dating back to the Mana period, with inscriptions dating back to around 800 BCE, indicating that the city of Zirtu (Izirta) was the capital of Mana.

Around Qalaychi, mountain military fortresses with defensive, surveillance, and reinforcement functions have been established. In the second season of the excavation team, Qalaychi was referred to as the largest military fortress of the Manneans on the northern shore of Zarrineh Rud.

== Manaian Inscriptions ==
In the village of Qalaychi, a stone inscription in ancient Aramaic script and language has been found, estimated to date back to 716 BCE. The content of the inscription refers to the recognition of the rule of the Mana capital by the "god of the royal temple" and their continued governance in that land. Nine clues indicate that the land of Mana extended from the south of Lake Urmia to the present-day Sanandaj and Bijar, which were all inhabited and populated, and Bukan was also in this area. In the inscription of Ephkal, Qalaychi Bukan is mentioned, in which glazed bricks were dedicated to Haldi (the god of war) and Hadad (the god of storm, lightning, and thunder), and in addition, Qalaychi is mentioned as a temple known as Zutar or Izirta, the capital of the Manneans. This inscription (EPHCAL) places it in the 8th or early 7th century BCE.
