= Duzakh Darreh, Jiroft =

Duzakh Darreh دوزخ دره
- Village
- Location within Iran
- Coordinates: 28°39′20″N 57°25′49″E
- Country: Iran
- Province: Kerman
- County: Jiroft
- Bakhsh: Central
- Rural District: Esfandaqeh

Population (2006)
  - Total: 80
- Time zone: UTC+3:30 (IRST)
  - Summer (DST): UTC+4:30 (IRDT)

Duzakh Darreh (Persian: دوزخ دره, also Romanized as Dūzakh Darreh; also known as Dūzakhdarreh) is a village in Esfandaqeh Rural District, in the Central District of Jiroft County, Kerman Province, Iran. At the 2006 census, its population was 80, in 18 families.
