= Mulanabad, Kurdistan =

Mulanabad مولان آباد
- Village
- Location within Iran
- Coordinates: 35°57′35″N 46°29′27″E
- Country: Iran
- Province: Kurdistan
- County: Saqqez
- Bakhsh: Ziviyeh
- Rural District: Khvor Khvoreh

Population (2006)
  - Total: 611
- Time zone: UTC+3:30 (IRST)
  - Summer (DST): UTC+4:30 (IRDT)

Mulanabad (Persian: مولان آباد, also Romanized as Mūlānābād, Moolan Abad, and Mowlānābād; also known as Mulinabad) is a village in Khvor Khvoreh Rural District, Ziviyeh District, Saqqez County, Kurdistan Province, Iran. At the 2006 census, its population was 611, in 124 families. The village is populated by Kurds.
