= Duzakh Darreh, Saqqez =

Duzakh Darreh دوزخ‌دره
- Village
- Location within Iran
- Coordinates: 36°14′14″N 46°19′20″E
- Country: Iran
- Province: Kurdistan
- County: Saqqez
- Bakhsh: Central
- Rural District: Sara

Population (2006)
  - Total: 743
- Time zone: UTC+3:30 (IRST)
  - Summer (DST): UTC+4:30 (IRDT)

Duzakh Darreh (Persian: دوزخ‌دره, also Romanized as Dūzakh Darreh) is a village in Sara Rural District, in the Central District of Saqqez County, Kurdistan Province, Iran. At the 2006 census, its population was 743, in 161 families. The village is populated by Kurds.
