= Takyeh (disambiguation) =

A takyeh (Persian: تکیه takye; plural: تکایا takâyâ) is a building where Shia Muslims gather to mourn Husayn's death in the month of Muharram.

Takyeh or Takiyeh or Takieh or Tekyah or Takeyeh or Tekeyeh may also refer to:

- Takyeh, Hamadan
- Tekyeh, Isfahan
- Takyeh, Kerman
- Tekyah, Kermanshah
- Tekeyeh-ye Sofla, Kermanshah
- Takyeh-ye Teymur, Kermanshah province
- Takyeh, Khuzestan
- Takyeh, Kohgiluyeh and Boyer-Ahmad
- Tekiyeh, Kurdistan
- Takyeh-ye Galin, Kurdistan province
- Tekeyeh-ye Hashmiz, Kurdistan province
- Takyeh-ye Olya, Kurdistan province
- Takyeh-ye Sofla, Kurdistan province
- Takyeh, Komijan, Markazi province
- Takyeh, Shazand, Markazi province
- Tekyeh Aghasht, Alborz province
- Tekyeh-e Sepahsalar, Alborz province
- Takyeh, West Azerbaijan
- Təkyə, a village in the Davachi Rayon of Azerbaijan
