= Lale =

Lale or Laleh may refer to:

== Geography ==
- Laleh, Iran, a village in Kurdistan Province, Iran
- Lale, Bulgaria, a village in Southern Bulgaria

== Given names ==
=== Lale ===
- Lale Akgün (born 1953), Turkish-German politician (SPD)
- Lale Andersen (1905–1972), German singer
- Lale Aytaman (born 1944), Turkish politician
- Lale Drekalov, Montenegrin chieftain
- Lale Karabıyık (1965–2025), Turkish scholar and politician
- Lale Karci (born 1969), Turkish-German actress and model
- Lale Müldür (born 1956), Turkish poet
- Lale Oraloğlu (1924–2007), Turkish actress and screenwriter
- Lale Orta (born 1960), Turkish football referee and academic
- Lale Sokolov (1916–2006), the tattooist of Auschwitz
- Lale Yavaş (born 1978), Turkish-Swiss actress

=== Laleh ===
- Laleh (singer) (born 1982), Swedish musician and actress, better known by her mononym "Laleh"
- Laleh Bakhtiar (1938-2020), Iranian-American Muslim author and translator
- Ladan and Laleh Bijani (1974–2003), Iranian conjoined twin
- Laleh Khadivi (born 1977), Iranian-American novelist and filmmaker
- Laleh Khalili, Iranian-American political scientist
- Laleh Khorramian (born 1974), Iranian-American visual artist
- Laleh Seddigh (born 1977), Iranian race car driver

== Surname ==
- David Lale (Australian cellist) (born 1962), Australian cellist
- David Lale (British cellist) (born 1981), British cellist
- Nuray Lale (born 1962), Turkish-German writer and translator
- Horace Percy Lale (1886–1955), British Army officer and World War I flying ace

== Media ==
- Laleh (album), the debut album by the Iranian-Swedish musician Laleh Pourkarim

== See also ==
- La La (disambiguation)
