= Dash Kasan =

Dash Kasan (Persian: داش كسن or داش كسان) may refer to various places in Iran:

- Dash Kasan, Ardabil (داش كسن - Dāsh Kasan)
- Dash Kasan, Charuymaq (داش كسن - Dāsh Kasan), East Azerbaijan Province
- Dash Kasan, Meyaneh (داش كسن - Dāsh Kasan), East Azerbaijan Province
- Dash Kasan, Isfahan (داش كسن - Dāsh Kasan)
- Dash Kasan, Kurdistan (داش كسان - Dāsh Kasān)
- Dash Kasan, Chaldoran (داش كسن - Dāsh Kasan), West Azerbaijan Province
- Dash Kasan, Shahin Dezh (داش كسن - Dāsh Kasan), West Azerbaijan Province
- Dash Kasan, Zanjan (داش كسن - Dāsh Kasan)
