= Baharlu, Iran =

Village in Kurdistan province, Iran

Baharlu Persian: بهارلو
- Village
- Location within Iran Location within Iran Kurdistan
- Coordinates: 35°12′09″N 48°07′21″E
- Country: Iran
- Province: Kurdistan
- County: Qorveh
- District: Delbaan
- Rural District: Delbaran

Population (2016)
  - Total: 812
- Time zone: UTC+3:30 (IRST)

Baharlu (Persian: بهارلو) (Note: Also romanized as Bahārlū) is a village in Delbaran Rural District of Delbaran District, Qorveh County, Kurdistan province, Iran.

== Demographics ==
=== Ethnicity ===
The village is populated by Azerbaijanis.

=== Population ===
At the time of the 2006 National Census, the village's population was 1,128 in 269 households, when it was in Chaharduli-ye Sharqi Rural District of Chaharduli District. The following census in 2011 counted 861 people in 245 households. The 2016 census measured the population of the village as 812 people in 261 households, by which time it had been separated from the district in the formation of Delbaran District. Baharlu was transferred to Delbaran Rural District in the new district. It was the most populous village in its rural district.
