= Diraklu =

Diraklu ديركلو
- village
- Location within Iran
- Coordinates: 35°23′53″N 47°54′39″E
- Country: Iran
- Province: Kurdistan
- County: Ghorveh
- Bakhsh: Serishabad
- Rural District: Qaslan

Population (2006)
  - Total: 137
- Time zone: UTC+3:30 (IRST)
  - Summer (DST): UTC+4:30 (IRDT)

Diraklu (Persian: ديركلو, also Romanized as Dīraklū; also known as Thirk ‘Ali and Tork ‘Alī) is a village in Qaslan Rural District, Serishabad District, Ghorveh County, Kurdistan Province, Iran. At the 2006 census, its population was 137, in 26 families. The village is populated by Azerbaijanis.

There is a volcanic cone in the southeast of Diraklu village, 27 kilometres (17 mi) northeast of Ghorveh city.
