= Chomoqlu Sheyda =

Chomoqlu Sheyda چمقلوشيدا
- Village
- Location within Iran
- Coordinates: 35°27′05″N 47°34′25″E
- Country: Iran
- Province: Kurdistan
- County: Qorveh
- Bakhsh: Serishabad
- Rural District: Lak

Population (2006)
  - Total: 173
- Time zone: UTC+3:30 (IRST)
  - Summer (DST): UTC+4:30 (IRDT)

Chomoqlu Sheyda (Persian: چمقلوشيدا, also Romanized as Chomoqlū Sheydā and Chomoqlū-ye Sheydā; also known as Chagholū-ye Sheydā, Chāmagūlī, Chāmeh Gūl, Chamghola Sheīda, Chamgholū-ye Sheydā, Chamqolū, and Chamqolū) is a village in Lak Rural District, Serishabad District, Qorveh County, Kurdistan Province, Iran. At the 2006 census, its population was 173, in 42 families. The village is populated by Kurds.
