= Qezeljeh Kand =

Qezeljeh Kand قزلجه كند
- Village
- Location within Iran
- Coordinates: 35°19′42″N 47°57′56″E
- Country: Iran
- Province: Kurdistan
- County: Qorveh
- Bakhsh: Central
- Rural District: Delbaran

Population (2006)
  - Total: 851
- Time zone: UTC+3:30 (IRST)
  - Summer (DST): UTC+4:30 (IRDT)

Qezeljeh Kand (Persian: قزلجه كند, also Romanized as Qezeljah Kand; also known as Qizil Jakhand) is a village in Delbaran Rural District, in the Central District of Qorveh County, Kurdistan Province, Iran. At the 2006 census, its population was 851, in 236 families. The village is populated by Azerbaijanis.
