= Shokuhabad =

Shokuhabad شكوه آباد
- Village
- Location within Iran
- Coordinates: 35°08′43″N 47°54′51″E
- Country: Iran
- Province: Kurdistan
- County: Qorveh
- Bakhsh: Central
- Rural District: Delbaran

Population (2006)
  - Total: 709
- Time zone: UTC+3:30 (IRST)
  - Summer (DST): UTC+4:30 (IRDT)

Shokuhabad (Persian: شكوه آباد, also Romanized as Shokūhābād and Shekūhābād; also known as Shukrabad) is a village in Delbaran Rural District, in the Central District of Qorveh County, Kurdistan Province, Iran. At the 2006 census, its population was 709, in 173 families. The village is populated by Kurds.
