= Kharileh =

Kharileh خريله
- Village
- Location within Iran
- Coordinates: 35°11′18″N 47°55′26″E
- Country: Iran
- Province: Kurdistan
- County: Qorveh
- Bakhsh: Central
- Rural District: Delbaran

Population (2006)
  - Total: 656
- Time zone: UTC+3:30 (IRST)
  - Summer (DST): UTC+4:30 (IRDT)

Kharileh (Persian: خريله, also Romanized as Kharīleh) is a village in Delbaran Rural District, in the Central District of Qorveh County, Kurdistan Province, Iran. At the 2006 census, its population was 656, in 155 families. The village is populated by Kurds.
