= Sheykh Taqqeh =

Sheykh Taqqeh شيخ تقه
- Village
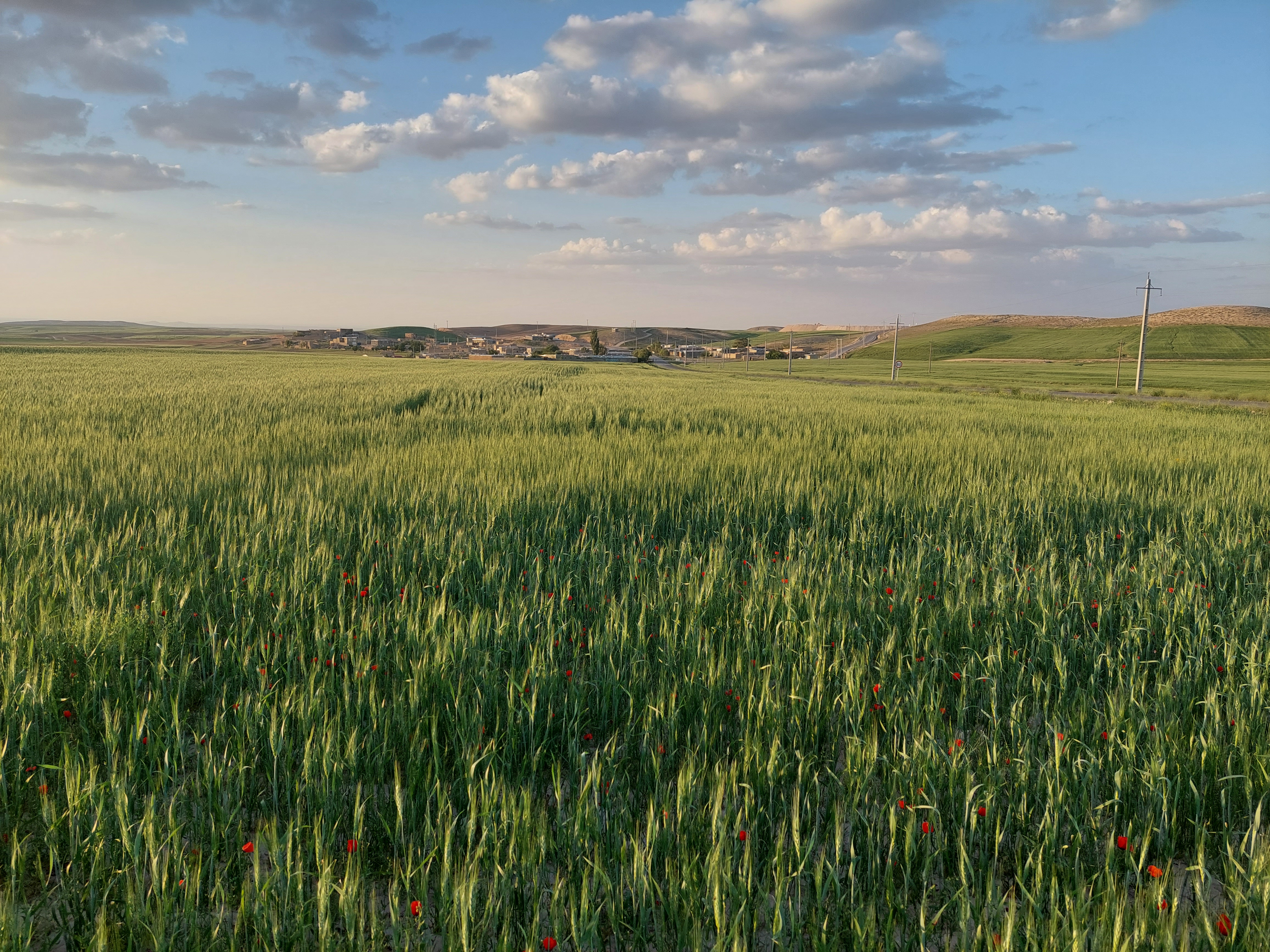
- Sheikh Tagh village in spring.

- Location within Iran
- Coordinates: 35°15′15″N 47°40′49″E
- Country: Iran
- Province: Kurdistan
- County: Qorveh
- Bakhsh: Serishabad
- Rural District: Yalghuz Aghaj

Population (2006)
  - Total: 163
- Time zone: UTC+3:30 (IRST)
  - Summer (DST): UTC+4:30 (IRDT)

Sheykh Taqqeh (Persian: شيخ تقه, also Romanized as Sheykh Taqeh; also known as Shaikh Tāfeh, Sheikh Tagheh, Sheykh Taqī, and Sheykh Tāvez) is a village in Yalghuz Aghaj Rural District, Serishabad District, Qorveh County, Kurdistan Province, Iran. At the 2006 census, its population was 163, in 37 families. The village is populated by Kurds.
