= Qasemabad, Kurdistan =

Village in Qorveh County, Iran

Qasemabad قاسم آباد
- Village
- Location within Iran
- Coordinates: 35°09′26″N 47°54′39″E
- Country: Iran
- Province: Kurdistan
- County: Qorveh
- Bakhsh: Central
- Rural District: Delbaran

Population (2006)
  - Total: 126
- Time zone: UTC+3:30 (IRST)
  - Summer (DST): UTC+4:30 (IRDT)

Qasemabad (Persian: قاسم آباد, also Romanized as Qāsemābād) is a village in Delbaran Rural District, in the Central District of Qorveh County, Kurdistan Province, Iran. At the 2006 census, its population was 126, in 30 families. The village is populated by Kurds.
