= Malujeh Rural District =

Rural district in Kurdistan province, Iran

Malujeh Rural District Persian: دهستان مالوجه
- Rural District
- Location within Iran Location within Iran Kurdistan
- Coordinates: 35°18′40″N 47°58′16″E
- Country: Iran
- Province: Kurdistan
- County: Qorveh
- District: Delbaran
- Capital: Tughan-e Baba Gorgor

Population (2016)
  - Total: 5,480
- Time zone: UTC+3:30 (IRST)

Malujeh Rural District (Persian: دهستان مالوجه) is in Delbaran District of Qorveh County, Kurdistan province, Iran. Its capital is the village of Tughan-e Baba Gorgor. The previous capital of the rural district was the village of Malujeh, now a city.

== History ==
After the 2011 National Census, Delbaran Rural District and the city of Delbaran were separated from the Central District in the formation of Delbaran District, and Malujeh Rural District was created in the new district.

== Demographics ==
=== Population ===
At the time of the 2016 census, the rural district's population was 5,480 in 1,682 households. The most populous of its four villages was Malujeh (now a city), with 4,164 people.
