= Baghlujeh, Qorveh =

Baghlujeh باغلوجه
- Village
- Location within Iran
- Coordinates: 35°13′27″N 48°01′50″E
- Country: Iran
- Province: Kurdistan
- County: Qorveh
- Bakhsh: Central
- Rural District: Delbaran

Population (2006)
  - Total: 281
- Time zone: UTC+3:30 (IRST)
  - Summer (DST): UTC+4:30 (IRDT)

Baghlujeh (Persian: باغلوجه, also Romanized as Bāghlūjeh and Baghloojeh; also known as Bāghlijeh) is a village in Delbaran Rural District, in the Central District of Qorveh County, Kurdistan Province, Iran. At the 2006 census, its population was 281, in 76 families. The village is populated by Azerbaijanis.
