= Niaz Bolagh =

Niaz Bolagh نيازبلاغ
- Village
- Location within Iran
- Coordinates: 35°28′46″N 47°53′15″E
- Country: Iran
- Province: Kurdistan
- County: Qorveh
- Bakhsh: Serishabad
- Rural District: Lak

Population (2006)
  - Total: 369
- Time zone: UTC+3:30 (IRST)
  - Summer (DST): UTC+4:30 (IRDT)

Niaz Bolagh (Persian: نيازبلاغ, also Romanized as Nīāz Bolāgh and Neyāz Bolāgh; also known as Niyāz Būlāh) is a village in Lak Rural District, Serishabad District, Qorveh County, Kurdistan Province, Iran. At the 2006 census, its population was 369, in 72 families. The village is populated by Kurds.
