= Sanginabad =

Sanginabad سنگين آباد
- Village
- Location within Iran
- Coordinates: 35°06′50″N 47°50′18″E
- Country: Iran
- Province: Kurdistan
- County: Qorveh
- Bakhsh: Central
- Rural District: Badr

Population (2006)
  - Total: 734
- Time zone: UTC+3:30 (IRST)
  - Summer (DST): UTC+4:30 (IRDT)

Sanginabad (Persian: سنگين آباد, also Romanized as Sangīnābād) is a village in Badr Rural District, in the Central District of Qorveh County, Kurdistan Province, Iran. At the 2006 census, its population was 734, in 148 families. The village is populated by Kurds.
