= Fakhrabad, Kurdistan =

Fakhrabad فخر آباد
- Village
- Location within Iran
- Coordinates: 35°20′31″N 47°36′08″E
- Country: Iran
- Province: Kurdistan
- County: Qorveh
- Bakhsh: Serishabad
- Rural District: Yalghuz Aghaj

Population (2006)
  - Total: 215
- Time zone: UTC+3:30 (IRST)
  - Summer (DST): UTC+4:30 (IRDT)

Fakhrabad (Persian: فخر آباد, also Romanized as Fakhrābād; also known as Faqrābād and Fekrābād) is a village in Yalghuz Aghaj Rural District, Serishabad District, Qorveh County, Kurdistan Province, Iran. At the 2006 census, its population was 215, in 48 families. The village is populated by Kurds.
