= Qaleh, Kurdistan =

Neighborhood in Kurdistan province, Iran

Qaleh Persian: قلعه
- Neighborhood
- Location within Iran Location within Iran Kurdistan
- Coordinates: 35°08′03″N 47°48′10″E
- Country: Iran
- Province: Kurdistan
- County: Qorveh
- District: Central
- City: Qorveh

Population (2006)
  - Total: 4,029
- Time zone: UTC+3:30 (IRST)

Qaleh (Persian: قلعه) (Note: Also romanized as Qal‘eh; also known as Kāl) is a neighborhood in the city of Qorveh in the Central District of Qorveh County, Kurdistan province, Iran. As a village, it was the capital of Badr Rural District until its capital was transferred to the village of Veyhaj.

== Demographics ==
=== Ethnicity ===
The neighborhood is populated by Kurds.

=== Population ===
At the time of the 2006 National Census, Qaleh's population was 4,029 in 995 households, when it was a village in Badr Rural District. After the census, Qaleh merged with the city of Qorveh.
