= Chaghar Bolagh =

Chaghar Bolagh چاغربلاغ
- Village
- Location within Iran
- Coordinates: 35°04′03″N 47°28′19″E
- Country: Iran
- Province: Kurdistan
- County: Qorveh
- Bakhsh: Central
- Rural District: Panjeh Ali-ye Jonubi

Population (2006)
  - Total: 497
- Time zone: UTC+3:30 (IRST)
  - Summer (DST): UTC+4:30 (IRDT)

Chaghar Bolagh (Persian: چاغربلاغ, also Romanized as Chāghar Bolāgh; also known as Chalākh, Chaqar Bolāgh, and Chaulākh) is a village in Panjeh Ali-ye Jonubi Rural District, in the Central District of Qorveh County, Kurdistan Province, Iran. At the 2006 census, its population was 497, in 110 families. The village is populated by Kurds.
