= Baba Gorgor, Kurdistan =

Baba Gorgor باباگرگر
- Village
- Location within Iran
- Coordinates: 35°17′24″N 47°54′15″E
- Country: Iran
- Province: Kurdistan
- County: Qorveh
- Bakhsh: Central
- Rural District: Delbaran

Population (2006)
  - Total: 12
- Time zone: UTC+3:30 (IRST)
  - Summer (DST): UTC+4:30 (IRDT)

Baba Gorgor (Persian: باباگرگر, also Romanized as Bābā Gorgor and Baba Gargar; also known as Baba Gurgar) is a village in Delbaran Rural District, in the north of the Central District of Qorveh County, Kurdistan Province, Iran. At the 2006 census, its population was 12, in 4 families. The village is populated by Azerbaijanis.
