= Bay Tamer =

Bay Tamer باي تمر
- Village
- Location within Iran
- Coordinates: 35°23′18″N 47°34′02″E
- Country: Iran
- Province: Kurdistan
- County: Qorveh
- Bakhsh: Serishabad
- Rural District: Yalghuz Aghaj

Population (2006)
  - Total: 98
- Time zone: UTC+3:30 (IRST)
  - Summer (DST): UTC+4:30 (IRDT)

Bay Tamer (Persian: باي تمر, also Romanized as Bāy Tamer, Baytamr, and Bāytamer; also known as Baīt-ī-‘Ūmr, Bā-ye Tamer, and Beyt-e ‘Amr) is a village in Yalghuz Aghaj Rural District, Serishabad District, Qorveh County, Kurdistan Province, Iran. At the 2006 census, its population was 98, in 21 families. The village is populated by Kurds.
