= Su Tappeh =

Su Tappeh سوتپه
- Village
- Location within Iran
- Coordinates: 34°58′15″N 47°59′30″E
- Country: Iran
- Province: Kurdistan
- County: Qorveh
- Bakhsh: Chaharduli
- Rural District: Chaharduli-ye Gharbi

Population (2006)
  - Total: 780
- Time zone: UTC+3:30 (IRST)
  - Summer (DST): UTC+4:30 (IRDT)

Su Tappeh (Persian: سوتپه, also Romanized as Sū Tappeh and Sutapeh) is a village in Chaharduli-ye Gharbi Rural District, Chaharduli District, Qorveh County, Kurdistan Province, Iran. At the 2006 census, its population was 780, in 176 families. The village is populated by Kurds.
