= Polu Sarkan =

Polu Sarkan پلوسركان
- Village
- Location within Iran
- Coordinates: 35°05′03″N 47°52′17″E
- Country: Iran
- Province: Kurdistan
- County: Qorveh
- Bakhsh: Chaharduli
- Rural District: Chaharduli-ye Gharbi

Population (2006)
  - Total: 354
- Time zone: UTC+3:30 (IRST)
  - Summer (DST): UTC+4:30 (IRDT)

Polu Sarkan (Persian: پلوسركان, also Romanized as Polū Sarkān, Polū Serkān, and Poloosarkan; also known as Pol-e Sergān and Pul-i-Sarkān) is a village in Chaharduli-ye Gharbi Rural District, Chaharduli District, Qorveh County, Kurdistan Province, Iran. At the 2006 census, its population was 354, in 89 families. The village is populated by Kurds.
