= Ney Band =

Ney Band ني بند
- Village
- Location within Iran
- Coordinates: 35°12′45″N 48°04′32″E
- Country: Iran
- Province: Kurdistan
- County: Qorveh
- Bakhsh: Central
- Rural District: Delbaran

Population (2006)
  - Total: 298
- Time zone: UTC+3:30 (IRST)
  - Summer (DST): UTC+4:30 (IRDT)

Ney Band (Persian: ني بند) is a village in Delbaran Rural District, in the Central District of Qorveh County, Kurdistan Province, Iran. At the 2006 census, its population was 298, in 70 families. The village is populated by Azerbaijanis.
