= Jameh Shuran (disambiguation) =

Jameh Shuran is a village in Kurdistan Province, Iran.

Jameh Shuran (Persian: جامه شوران) may also refer to:

- Jameh Shuran-e Olya (disambiguation)
- Jameh Shuran-e Sofla (disambiguation)
