= Bermeh Tappeh =

Bermeh Tappeh برمه تپه
- Village
- Location within Iran
- Coordinates: 35°00′39″N 48°00′00″E
- Country: Iran
- Province: Kurdistan
- County: Qorveh
- Bakhsh: Chaharduli
- Rural District: Chaharduli-ye Gharbi

Population (2006)
  - Total: 361
- Time zone: UTC+3:30 (IRST)
  - Summer (DST): UTC+4:30 (IRDT)

Bermeh Tappeh (Persian: برمه تپه; also known as Borom Tappeh) is a village in Chaharduli-ye Gharbi Rural District, Chaharduli District, Qorveh County, Kurdistan Province, Iran. At the 2006 census, its population was 361, in 75 families. The village is populated by Kurds.
