= Moshirabad =

Moshirabad (Persian: مشيراباد) may refer to:

- Moshirabad, Heris, East Azerbaijan Province
- Moshirabad, Tabriz, East Azerbaijan Province
- Moshirabad, Bijar, Kurdistan Province
- Moshirabad-e Owriyeh, Kurdistan Province
- Moshirabad-e Panjeh, Kurdistan Province
- Moshirabad, West Azerbaijan
