= Sanduqabad =

Sanduqabad صندوق آباد
- Village
- Location within Iran
- Coordinates: 35°01′38″N 47°58′21″E
- Country: Iran
- Province: Kurdistan
- County: Qorveh
- Bakhsh: Chaharduli
- Rural District: Chaharduli-ye Gharbi

Population (2006)
  - Total: 760
- Time zone: UTC+3:30 (IRST)
  - Summer (DST): UTC+4:30 (IRDT)

Sanduqabad (Persian: صندوق آباد, also Romanized as Şandūqābād; also known as Şandoqābād, and Saufīlābād) is a village in Chaharduli-ye Gharbi Rural District, Chaharduli District, Qorveh County, Kurdistan Province, Iran. At the 2006 census, its population was 760, in 176 families. The village is populated by Kurds.
