= Quchaq =

Quchaq (Persian: قوچاق) may refer to:

- Quchaq, Divandarreh
- Quchaq, Qorveh
- Quchaq, Saqqez
