= Baba Sheydollah =

Baba Sheydollah باباشيداله
- Village
- Location within Iran
- Coordinates: 35°09′04″N 48°08′26″E
- Country: Iran
- Province: Kurdistan
- County: Qorveh
- Bakhsh: Chaharduli
- Rural District: Chaharduli-ye Sharqi

Population (2006)
  - Total: 501
- Time zone: UTC+3:30 (IRST)
  - Summer (DST): UTC+4:30 (IRDT)

Baba Sheydollah (Persian: باباشيداله, also Romanized as Bābā Sheydollāh; also known as Bāba Saidullah) is a village in Chaharduli-ye Sharqi Rural District, Chaharduli District, Qorveh County, Kurdistan Province, Iran. At the 2006 census, its population was 501, in 113 families. The village is populated by Azerbaijanis.
