= Narenjak =

Narenjak نارنجك
- Village
- Location within Iran
- Coordinates: 35°07′44″N 48°05′43″E
- Country: Iran
- Province: Kurdistan
- County: Qorveh
- Bakhsh: Chaharduli
- Rural District: Chaharduli-ye Sharqi

Population (2006)
  - Total: 961
- Time zone: UTC+3:30 (IRST)
  - Summer (DST): UTC+4:30 (IRDT)

Narenjak (Persian: نارنجك, also Romanized as Nārenjak; also known as Nīrīnjeh) is a village in Chaharduli-ye Sharqi Rural District, Chaharduli District, Qorveh County, Kurdistan Province, Iran. At the 2006 census, its population was 961, in 232 families.

== Language ==
Linguistic composition of the city:

Narenjak linguistic composition
| language | percent |
| Southern Kurdish | 97% |
| Azerbaijani | 3% |
