= Kameshgaran =

Kameshgaran كامشگران
- Village
- Location within Iran
- Coordinates: 35°13′24″N 47°35′17″E
- Country: Iran
- Province: Kurdistan
- County: Qorveh
- Bakhsh: Central
- Rural District: Panjeh Ali

Population (2006)
  - Total: 716
- Time zone: UTC+3:30 (IRST)
  - Summer (DST): UTC+4:30 (IRDT)

Kameshgaran (Persian: كامشگران, also Romanized as Kāmeshgarān and Kameshgarān) is a village in Panjeh Ali Rural District, in the Central District of Qorveh County, Kurdistan Province, Iran. At the 2006 census, its population was 716, in 162 families. The village is populated by Kurds.
