= Kaku =

Kaku may refer to:

- Kaku (name)
- Kaku (TV channel), a channel of Beijing TV
- Kaku, Golestan, a village in Golestan Province, Iran
- Kaku, Kurdistan (disambiguation), villages in Kurdistan Province, Iran
- Kaku, Nepal
- Kaku, Rõuge Parish, a village in Rõuge Parish, Võru County, Estonia
- Kaku, Võru Parish, a village in Võru Parish, Võru County, Estonia
- Käku, a village in Saare County, Estonia
- Kaku (footballer), born Alejandro Romero Gamarra, Paraguayan footballer
- Michio Kaku, science communicator
- Jaikishan Kaku Bhai Shroff (born 1957), Indian film actor, better known as Jackie Shroff

== Fictional characters ==
- Kaku (One Piece), a fictional character from Eiichirō Oda's manga One Piece
- Kaku the Tiger, a student of Charles Darwin Middle School from the cartoon My Gym Partner's a Monkey
- Seiga Kaku, a character in Ten Desires from the video game franchise Touhou Project
