= Sheykh Jafar =

Sheykh Jafar شيخ جعفر
- Village
- Location within Iran
- Coordinates: 35°13′15″N 47°52′42″E
- Country: Iran
- Province: Kurdistan
- County: Qorveh
- Bakhsh: Serishabad
- Rural District: Qaslan

Population (2006)
  - Total: 708
- Time zone: UTC+3:30 (IRST)
  - Summer (DST): UTC+4:30 (IRDT)

Sheykh Jafar (Persian: شيخ جعفر, also Romanized as Sheykh Ja‘far) is a village in Qaslan Rural District, Serishabad District, Qorveh County, Kurdistan Province, Iran. At the 2006 census, its population was 708, in 185 families. The village is populated by Azerbaijanis.
