= Zangabad =

Zangabad (Persian: زنگ اباد) may refer to:

- Zangabad, East Azerbaijan
- Zangabad, Kurdistan
- Zangabad, Piranshahr, West Azerbaijan Province
- Zangabad, Urmia, West Azerbaijan Province
