= Sartipabad =

Sartipabad (Persian: سرتيپاباد or سرتيپ آباد) may refer to:

- Sartipabad, Kermanshah
- Sartipabad, Kohgiluyeh and Boyer-Ahmad
- Sartipabad, Kurdistan
