= Kechi Gerd =

Kechi Gerd كچي گرد
- Village
- Location within Iran
- Coordinates: 35°23′47″N 47°35′32″E
- Country: Iran
- Province: Kurdistan
- County: Qorveh
- Bakhsh: Serishabad
- Rural District: Yalghuz Aghaj

Population (2006)
  - Total: 160
- Time zone: UTC+3:30 (IRST)
  - Summer (DST): UTC+4:30 (IRDT)

Kechi Gerd (Persian: كچي گرد, also Romanized as Kechī Gerd and Kachī Gerd; also known as Gachī Gerd and Kachigird) is a village in Yalghuz Aghaj Rural District, Serishabad District, Qorveh County, Kurdistan Province, Iran. At the 2006 census, its population was 160, in 40 families. The village is populated by Kurds.
