= Selseleh, Kurdistan =

Selseleh سلسله
- Village
- Location within Iran
- Coordinates: 35°07′45″N 47°27′08″E
- Country: Iran
- Province: Kurdistan
- County: Qorveh
- Bakhsh: Central
- Rural District: Panjeh Ali-ye Jonubi

Population (2006)
  - Total: 539
- Time zone: UTC+3:30 (IRST)
  - Summer (DST): UTC+4:30 (IRDT)

Selseleh (Persian: سلسله; also known as Sīlsāleh) is a village in Panjeh Ali-ye Jonubi Rural District, in the Central District of Qorveh County, Kurdistan Province, Iran. At the 2006 census, its population was 539, in 128 families. The village is populated by Kurds.
