= Pir Soleyman =

Pir Soleyman پيرسليمان
- Village
- Location within Iran
- Coordinates: 35°04′22″N 47°47′15″E
- Country: Iran
- Province: Kurdistan
- County: Qorveh
- Bakhsh: Central
- Rural District: Badr

Population (2006)
  - Total: 88
- Time zone: UTC+3:30 (IRST)
  - Summer (DST): UTC+4:30 (IRDT)

Pir Soleyman (Persian: پيرسليمان, also Romanized as Pīr Soleymān) is a village in Badr Rural District, in the Central District of Qorveh County, Kurdistan Province, Iran. At the 2006 census, its population was 88, in 18 families. The village is populated by Kurds.
