= Avengan =

Avengan آونگان
- Village
- Location within Iran
- Coordinates: 35°14′05″N 47°40′08″E
- Country: Iran
- Province: Kurdistan
- County: Qorveh
- Bakhsh: Serishabad
- Rural District: Yalghuz Aghaj

Population (2006)
  - Total: 890
- Time zone: UTC+3:30 (IRST)
  - Summer (DST): UTC+4:30 (IRDT)

Avengan (Persian: آونگان, also Romanized as Āvengān and Āvangān; also known as Āvīngān and Āwīngān) is a village in Yalghuz Aghaj Rural District, Serishabad District, Qorveh County, Kurdistan Province, Iran. At the 2006 census, its population was 890, in 218 families. The village is populated by Kurds.
