= Owriyeh =

Owriyeh اوريه
- Village
- Location within Iran
- Coordinates: 35°07′21″N 47°43′24″E
- Country: Iran
- Province: Kurdistan
- County: Qorveh
- Bakhsh: Central
- Rural District: Badr

Population (2006)
  - Total: 268
- Time zone: UTC+3:30 (IRST)
  - Summer (DST): UTC+4:30 (IRDT)

Owriyeh (Persian: اوريه, also Romanized as Owrīyeh and Aurīyeh; also known as Orīyeh) is a village in Badr Rural District, in the Central District of Qorveh County, Kurdistan Province, Iran. At the 2006 census, its population was 268, in 57 families. The village is populated by Kurds.
