= Chamaqlu =

Chamaqlu چمقلو
- Village
- Location within Iran
- Coordinates: 35°13′47″N 47°36′46″E
- Country: Iran
- Province: Kurdistan
- County: Qorveh
- Bakhsh: Central
- Rural District: Panjeh Ali

Population (2006)
  - Total: 528
- Time zone: UTC+3:30 (IRST)
  - Summer (DST): UTC+4:30 (IRDT)

Chamaqlu (Persian: چمقلو, also Romanized as Chamāqlū, Chamqolū, Chomāqlū, Chomoqlū, and Chom Qolū; also known as Chāmaguli, Chamgholū, and Cham Oghlī) is a village in Panjeh Ali Rural District, in the Central District of Qorveh County, Kurdistan Province, Iran. At the 2006 census, its population was 528, in 124 families. The village is populated by Kurds.
