= Chahargah =

Chahargah or Chahar Gah (Persian: چهارگاه) may refer to:

- Chahargah, Kermanshah, Iran
- Chahar Gah, Kurdistan, Iran
- Chahargah, West Azerbaijan
- Chahargah (mode), a Dastgāh of Persian music
