= Do Sar =

Do Sar or Dusar or Dow Sar or Dowsar (Persian: دوسر) may refer to:

- Do Sar, Bijar, Kurdistan Province
- Do Sar, Qorveh, Kurdistan Province
- Do Sar, Lorestan
