= Mehdikhan, Kurdistan =

Mehdikhan مهدي خان
- Village
- Location within Iran
- Coordinates: 35°22′06″N 47°48′41″E
- Country: Iran
- Province: Kurdistan
- County: Qorveh
- Bakhsh: Serishabad
- Rural District: Qaslan

Population (2006)
  - Total: 229
- Time zone: UTC+3:30 (IRST)
  - Summer (DST): UTC+4:30 (IRDT)

Mehdikhan (Persian: مهدي خان, also Romanized as Mehdīkhān and Mehdī Khān; also known as Maekhāneh) is a village in Qaslan Rural District, Serishabad District, Qorveh County, Kurdistan Province, Iran. At the 2006 census, its population was 229, in 69 families. The village is populated by Azerbaijanis with a Kurdish minority.
