= Malujeh =

City in Kurdistan province, Iran

Malujeh Persian: مالوجه
- City
- Location within Iran Location within Iran Kurdistan
- Coordinates: 35°18′02″N 47°58′33″E
- Country: Iran
- Province: Kurdistan
- County: Qorveh
- District: Delbaran

Population (2016)
  - Total: 4,164
- Time zone: UTC+3:30 (IRST)

Malujeh (Persian: مالوجه) (Note: Also romanized as Mālūjeh) is a city in Delbaran District of Qorveh County, Kurdistan province, Iran. As a village, it was the capital of Malujeh Rural District until its capital was transferred to the village of Tughan-e Baba Gorgor.

== Demographics ==
=== Ethnicity ===
The city is populated by Azerbaijanis.

=== Population ===
At the time of the 2006 National Census, Malujeh's population was 3,680 in 785 households, when it was a village in Delbaran Rural District of the Central District. The following census in 2011 counted 4,127 people in 1,184 households. The 2016 census measured the population of the village as 4,164 people in 1,245 households, by which time the rural district had been separated from the district in the formation of Delbaran District. The village was transferred to Malujeh Rural district created in the new district. It was the most populous village in its rural district.

After the census, Malujeh was elevated to the status of a city.
