= Asefabad, Kurdistan =

Asefabad آصف آباد
- Village
- Location within Iran
- Coordinates: 35°05′03″N 47°45′00″E
- Country: Iran
- Province: Kurdistan
- County: Qorveh
- Bakhsh: Central
- Rural District: Badr

Population (2006)
  - Total: 217
- Time zone: UTC+3:30 (IRST)
  - Summer (DST): UTC+4:30 (IRDT)

Asefabad (Persian: آصف آباد, also Romanized as Āşefābād; also known as Āsifābād) is a village in Badr Rural District, in the Central District of Qorveh County, Kurdistan Province, Iran. At the 2006 census, its population was 217, in 44 families. The village is populated by Kurds.
