= Nabiabad, Kurdistan =

Village in Kurdistan province, Iran

Nabiabad Persian: نبي آباد
- Village
- Location within Iran Location within Iran Kurdistan
- Country: Iran
- Province: Kurdistan
- County: Qorveh
- District: Central
- Rural District: Panjeh Ali-ye Jonubi

Population (2016)
  - Total: 873
- Time zone: UTC+3:30 (IRST)

Nabiabad (Persian: نبي آباد) (Note: Also romanized as Nabīābād; also known as Nayābād and Neyābād) is a village in Panjeh Ali-ye Jonubi Rural District of the Central District of Qorveh County, Kurdistan province, Iran.

== Demographics ==
=== Ethnicity ===
The village is populated by Kurds.

=== Population ===
At the time of the 2006 National Census, the village's population was 884 in 190 households. The following census in 2011 counted 916 people in 231 households. The 2016 census measured the population of the village as 873 people in 255 households. It was the most populous village in its rural district.
