= Veyhaj =

Village in Kurdistan province, Iran

Veyhaj Persian: ويهج
- Village
- Location within Iran Location within Iran Kurdistan
- Coordinates: 35°06′45″N 47°46′08″E
- Country: Iran
- Province: Kurdistan
- County: Qorveh
- District: Central
- Rural District: Badr

Population (2016)
  - Total: 777
- Time zone: UTC+3:30 (IRST)

Veyhaj (Persian: ويهج) (Note: Also romanized as Vīhaj and Vīhej; also known as Wahaj) is a village in, and the capital of, Badr Rural District of the Central District of Qorveh County, Kurdistan province, Iran. The previous capital of the rural district was the village of Qaleh.

== Demographics ==
=== Ethnicity ===
The village is populated by Kurds.

=== Population ===
At the time of the 2006 National Census, the village's population was 757 in 192 households. The following census in 2011 counted 817 people in 226 households. The 2016 census measured the population of the village as 777 people in 237 households.
