= Zangabad, Kurdistan =

Zangabad زنگ آباد
- Village
- Location within Iran
- Coordinates: 35°07′53″N 48°00′13″E
- Country: Iran
- Province: Kurdistan
- County: Qorveh
- Bakhsh: Chaharduli
- Rural District: Chaharduli-ye Sharqi

Population (2006)
  - Total: 195
- Time zone: UTC+3:30 (IRST)
  - Summer (DST): UTC+4:30 (IRDT)

Zangabad (Persian: زنگ آباد, also Romanized as Zangābād) is a village in Chaharduli-ye Sharqi Rural District, Chaharduli District, Qorveh County, Kurdistan Province, Iran. At the 2006 census, its population was 195, in 45 families. The village is populated by Kurds.
