= Kongereh =

Kongereh or Kangareh or Kangrah or Kongerah or Kang-i-Rah (Persian: كنگره) may refer to:

- Kongereh, Kamyaran
- Kangareh, Qorveh
