= Jameh Shuran =

Jameh Shuran جامه شوران
- Village
- Location within Iran
- Coordinates: 35°06′46″N 47°37′59″E
- Country: Iran
- Province: Kurdistan
- County: Qorveh
- Bakhsh: Central
- Rural District: Panjeh Ali

Population (2006)
  - Total: 320
- Time zone: UTC+3:30 (IRST)
  - Summer (DST): UTC+4:30 (IRDT)

Jameh Shuran (Persian: جامه شوران, also Romanized as Jāmeh Shūrān; also known as Jamaishūrāu and Jameh Shūrā’ū) is a village in Panjeh Ali Rural District, in the Central District of Qorveh County, Kurdistan Province, Iran. At the 2006 census, its population was 320, in 77 families. The village is populated by Kurds.
