= Divzand =

Village in Kurdistan province, Iran

Divzand Persian: ديوزند
- Village
- Location within Iran Location within Iran Kurdistan
- Coordinates: 35°09′40″N 47°50′52″E
- Country: Iran
- Province: Kurdistan
- County: Qorveh
- District: Central
- Rural District: Badr

Population (2016)
  - Total: 1,745
- Time zone: UTC+3:30 (IRST)

Divzand (Persian: ديوزند) (Note: Also romanized as Dīvzand; also known as Dīwāzān) is a village in Badr Rural District of the Central District of Qorveh County, Kurdistan province, Iran.

== Demographics ==
=== Ethnicity ===
The village is populated by Kurds, with an Azerbaijani minority.

=== Population ===
At the time of the 2006 National Census, the village's population was 1,041 in 241 households. The following census in 2011 counted 1,526 people in 434 households. The 2016 census measured the population of the village as 1,745 people in 546 households. It was the most populous village in its rural district.
