= Hasan Khan, Kurdistan =

Hasan Khan حسن خان
- Village
- Location within Iran
- Coordinates: 35°26′21″N 47°41′17″E
- Country: Iran
- Province: Kurdistan
- County: Qorveh
- Bakhsh: Serishabad
- Rural District: Lak

Population (2006)
  - Total: 611
- Time zone: UTC+3:30 (IRST)
  - Summer (DST): UTC+4:30 (IRDT)

Hasan Khan (Persian: حسن خان, also Romanized as Ḩasan Khān) is a village in Lak Rural District, Serishabad District, Qorveh County, Kurdistan Province, Iran. At the 2006 census, its population was 611, in 129 families. The village is populated by Kurds.
