= Qamlu =

Village in Kurdistan province, Iran

Qamlu Persian: قاملو
- Village
- Location within Iran Location within Iran Kurdistan
- Coordinates: 35°10′49″N 47°30′09″E
- Country: Iran
- Province: Kurdistan
- County: Qorveh
- District: Central
- Rural District: Panjeh Ali-ye Jonubi

Population (2016)
  - Total: 769
- Time zone: UTC+3:30 (IRST)

Qamlu (Persian: قاملو) (Note: Also romanized as Qāmlū) is a village in, and the capital of, Panjeh Ali-ye Jonubi Rural District of the Central District of Qorveh County, Kurdistan province, Iran.

== Demographics ==
=== Ethnicity ===
The village is populated by Kurds.

=== Population ===
At the time of the 2006 National Census, the village's population was 713 in 171 households. The following census in 2011 counted 774 people in 232 households. The 2016 census measured the population of the village as 769 people in 256 households.
