= Gilaklu =

Village in Kurdistan province, Iran

Gilaklu Persian: گيلكلو
- Village
- Location within Iran Location within Iran Kurdistan
- Coordinates: 35°27′16″N 47°43′51″E
- Country: Iran
- Province: Kurdistan
- County: Qorveh
- District: Serishabad
- Rural District: Lak

Population (2016)
  - Total: 350
- Time zone: UTC+3:30 (IRST)

Gilaklu (Persian: گيلكلو) (Note: Also romanized as Gīlaklū; also known as Galgali and Gol Golī) is a village in, and the capital of, Lak Rural District of Serishabad District, (Note: Formerly Talvar District) Qorveh County, Kurdistan province, Iran.

== Demographics ==
=== Ethnicity ===
The village is populated by Kurds.

=== Population ===
At the time of the 2006 National Census, the village's population was 442 in 101 households. The following census in 2011 counted 410 people in 120 households. The 2016 census measured the population of the village as 350 people in 101 households. It was the most populous village in its rural district.
