= Kakuy-e Sofla =

Kakuy-e Sofla كاكوي سفلي
- Village
- Location within Iran
- Coordinates: 35°04′07″N 47°26′25″E
- Country: Iran
- Province: Kurdistan
- County: Qorveh
- Bakhsh: Central
- Rural District: Panjeh Ali-ye Jonubi

Population (2006)
  - Total: 252
- Time zone: UTC+3:30 (IRST)
  - Summer (DST): UTC+4:30 (IRDT)

Kakuy-e Sofla (Persian: كاكوي سفلي, also Romanized as Kākūy-e Soflá; also known as Kāhku, Kākū-ye Pā’īn, and Kākū-ye Soflá) is a village in Panjeh Ali-ye Jonubi Rural District, in the Central District of Qorveh County, Kurdistan Province, Iran. At the 2006 census, its population was 252, in 58 families. The village is populated by Kurds.
