= Shadiabad =

Shadiabad (Persian: شادي اباد) may refer to:

- Shadiabad, Kerman
- Shadiabad, Kurdistan
