= Balvaneh =

Balvaneh (Persian: بالوانه) may refer to:

- Balvaneh-ye Khaledi
- Balvaneh-ye Motamedi
