= Balvaneh-ye Motamedi =

Balvaneh-ye Motamedi بالوانه معتمدي
- Village
- Location within Iran
- Coordinates: 35°08′40″N 47°34′52″E
- Country: Iran
- Province: Kurdistan
- County: Qorveh
- Bakhsh: Central
- Rural District: Panjeh Ali

Population (2006)
  - Total: 319
- Time zone: UTC+3:30 (IRST)
  - Summer (DST): UTC+4:30 (IRDT)

Balvaneh-ye Motamedi (Persian: بالوانه معتمدي, also Romanized as Bālvāneh-ye Mo‘tamedī; also known as Tājābād) is a village in Panjeh Ali Rural District, in the Central District of Qorveh County, Kurdistan Province, Iran. At the 2006 census, its population was 319, in 70 families. The village is populated by Kurds.
