= Tughan =

Tughan or Towghan (Persian: طوغان) may refer to:

- Tughan-e Baba Gorgor
- Tughan al-Nasiri, a Mamluk prince and warrior (d. 1415)

== See also ==
- Toghan (disambiguation)
