= Do Sar, Qorveh =

Do Sar دوسر
- Village
- Location within Iran
- Coordinates: 35°06′05″N 48°01′36″E
- Country: Iran
- Province: Kurdistan
- County: Qorveh
- Bakhsh: Chaharduli
- Rural District: Chaharduli-ye Sharqi

Population (2006)
  - Total: 304
- Time zone: UTC+3:30 (IRST)
  - Summer (DST): UTC+4:30 (IRDT)

Do Sar (Persian: دوسر) is a village in Chaharduli-ye Sharqi Rural District, Chaharduli District, Qorveh County, Kurdistan Province, Iran. At the 2006 census, its population was 304, in 74 families. The village is populated by Kurds.
