= Kabud Khani-ye Sofla =

Kabud Khani-ye Sofla كبودخاني سفلي
- Village
- Location within Iran
- Coordinates: 35°10′30″N 47°26′46″E
- Country: Iran
- Province: Kurdistan
- County: Qorveh
- Bakhsh: Central
- Rural District: Panjeh Ali-ye Jonubi

Population (2006)
  - Total: 101
- Time zone: UTC+3:30 (IRST)
  - Summer (DST): UTC+4:30 (IRDT)

Kabud Khani-ye Sofla (Persian: كبودخاني سفلي, also Romanized as Kabūd Khānī-ye Soflá; also known as Kabūd Khānī-ye Pā’īn) is a village in Panjeh Ali-ye Jonubi Rural District, in the Central District of Qorveh County, Kurdistan Province, Iran. At the 2006 census, its population was 101, in 24 families. The village is populated by Kurds.
