= Tughan-e Baba Gorgor =

Village in Kurdistan province, Iran

Tughan-e Baba Gorgor Persian: طوغان باباگرگر
- Village
- Location within Iran Location within Iran Kurdistan
- Coordinates: 35°15′36″N 47°57′01″E
- Country: Iran
- Province: Kurdistan
- County: Qorveh
- District: Delbaran
- Rural District: Malujeh

Population (2016)
  - Total: 567
- Time zone: UTC+3:30 (IRST)

Tughan-e Baba Gorgor (Persian: طوغان باباگرگر) (Note: Also romanized as Ţūghān-e Bābā Gor Gor and Ţūghān-e Bābā Gorgor; also known as Toghān, Tooghan Jadid, Ţowghān, Towghān-e Jadīd, and Ţūghān) is a village in, and the capital of, Malujeh Rural District of Delbaran District, Qorveh County, Kurdistan province, Iran. The previous capital of the rural district was the village of Malujeh, now a city.

== Demographics ==
=== Ethnicity ===
The village is populated by Azerbaijanis and Kurds.

=== Population ===
At the time of the 2006 National Census, the village's population was 676 in 160 households, when it was in Delbaran Rural District of the Central District. The following census in 2011 counted 609 people in 197 households. The 2016 census measured the population of the village as 567 people in 182 households, by which time the rural district had been separated from the district in the formation of Delbaran District. Tughan-e Baba Gorgor was transferred to Malujeh Rural District created in the new district.
