= Shanureh =

Village in Kurdistan province, Iran

Shanureh Persian: شانوره
- Village
- Location within Iran Location within Iran Kurdistan
- Coordinates: 35°10′04″N 47°42′15″E
- Country: Iran
- Province: Kurdistan
- County: Qorveh
- District: Central
- Rural District: Panjeh Ali-ye Shomali

Population (2016)
  - Total: 803
- Time zone: UTC+3:30 (IRST)

Shanureh (Persian: شانوره) (Note: Also romanized as Shānūreh and Shānavareh; also known as Shah Nooreh, Shāh-e Nāwāreh, Shāh-i-Nawāreh, and Shāhnavazeh) is a village in Panjeh Ali-ye Shomali Rural District (Note: Formerly Panjeh Ali Rural District) of the Central District of Qorveh County, Kurdistan province, Iran.

== Demographics ==
=== Ethnicity ===
The village is populated by Kurds.

=== Population ===
At the time of the 2006 National Census, the village's population was 772 in 187 households. The following census in 2011 counted 897 people in 247 households. The 2016 census measured the population of the village as 803 people in 257 households. It was the most populous village in its rural district.
