= Takia =

Takia may refer to:

- Ayesha Takia, Indian actress
- Takia language
- Takia people of Madang Province, Papua New Guinea
- Bazmaghbiar, Armenia - formerly Takia
- Takia, Iran, a village in Markazi Province, Iran
- Takia (watercraft), a traditional watercraft of Fiji

== See also ==
- Takiya (disambiguation)
- Taqiyah (cap)
