= Qaslan =

Village in Kurdistan province, Iran

Qaslan Persian: قصلان
- Village
- Location within Iran Location within Iran Kurdistan
- Coordinates: 35°14′12″N 47°49′19″E
- Country: Iran
- Province: Kurdistan
- County: Qorveh
- District: Serishabad
- Rural District: Qaslan

Population (2016)
  - Total: 1,212
- Time zone: UTC+3:30 (IRST)

Qaslan (Persian: قصلان) (Note: Also romanized as Qaşlān) is a village in, and the capital of, Qaslan Rural District of Serishabad District, (Note: Formerly Talvar District) Qorveh County, Kurdistan province, Iran.

== Demographics ==
=== Ethnicity ===
The village is populated by Kurds.

=== Population ===
At the time of the 2006 National Census, the village's population was 1,135 in 301 households. The following census in 2011 counted 1,230 people in 341 households. The 2016 census measured the population of the village as 1,212 people in 342 households. It was the most populous village in its rural district.
