= Khoshkamrud-e Sofla =

Khoshkamrud-e Sofla خشكمرودسفلي
- Village
- Location within Iran
- Coordinates: 35°19′23″N 47°38′07″E
- Country: Iran
- Province: Kurdistan
- County: Qorveh
- Bakhsh: Serishabad
- Rural District: Yalghuz Aghaj

Population (2006)
  - Total: 321
- Time zone: UTC+3:30 (IRST)
  - Summer (DST): UTC+4:30 (IRDT)

Khoshkamrud-e Sofla (Persian: خشكمرودسفلي, also Romanized as Khoshkamrūd-e Soflá and Khoshkemrūd-e Soflá; also known as Khoshkamrūd-e Pā’īn, Khoshkeh Marrūd-e Soflá, Khoshkeh Marūd, and Voshkamarū-ye Pā’īn) is a village in Yalghuz Aghaj Rural District, Serishabad District, Qorveh County, Kurdistan Province, Iran. At the 2006 census, its population was 321, in 88 families. The village is populated by Kurds.
