= Toghan =

Toghan (Persian: طغان) may refer to:

== Places ==
- Tughan-e Baba Gorgor, Kurdistan Province, Iran
- Toghan, Mazandaran, Iran
- Toghan, Tehran, Iran

== People ==
- Toghon (son of Kublai), or Toghan, Togon, who led Mongol armies into Burma and Vietnam
- Toghon Temür (1320-1370), Mongol emperor of Yuan China
- Toghan-Shah Abu Bakr (d. 1185 or 1186), amir of Nishapur from 1174 until his death

== See also ==
- Tughan (disambiguation)
