= Majin =

Majin may refer to:

== Places ==
- Majin, Ilam, Iran
- Majin, Kurdistan, Iran
- Mazhin, Darreh Shahr, a city in Ilam province
- Mazhin District, in Ilam province, Iran
- Mazhin Rural District, in Ilam province, Iran
- Taebong, a Korean state known as Majin between 904 and 911

== Media ==
- Majin and the Forsaken Kingdom, a video game
- Majin Buu, an antagonist in the Dragon Ball franchise
- Majin Bone, a card game, adapted into a manga and anime series
- Mashin Hero Wataru, a multimedia franchise
- Majin Tensei, a video game series
- Neko Majin, a manga series
