= Chaharduli =

Chaharduli (Persian: چهاردولی) may refer to:

- Chaharduli District
- Chaharduli Rural District (disambiguation)
