= Moshirabad-e Owriyeh =

Moshirabad-e Owriyeh مشير آباد اوريه
- Village
- Location within Iran
- Coordinates: 35°08′51″N 47°42′59″E
- Country: Iran
- Province: Kurdistan
- County: Qorveh
- Bakhsh: Central
- Rural District: Badr

Population (2006)
  - Total: 184
- Time zone: UTC+3:30 (IRST)
  - Summer (DST): UTC+4:30 (IRDT)

Moshirabad-e Owriyeh (Persian: مشير آباد اوريه, also Romanized as Moshīrābād-e Owrīyeh and Moshīrābād-e Āveryeh; also known as Moshīrābād, Mūsherābād, and Mūshīrābād) is a village in Badr Rural District, in the Central District of Qorveh County, Kurdistan Province, Iran. At the 2006 census, its population was 184, in 41 families. The village is populated by Kurds.
