= Sartipabad, Kurdistan =

Sartipabad سرتيپ آباد
- Village
- Location within Iran
- Coordinates: 35°06′18″N 47°46′57″E
- Country: Iran
- Province: Kurdistan
- County: Qorveh
- Bakhsh: Central
- Rural District: Badr

Population (2006)
  - Total: 171
- Time zone: UTC+3:30 (IRST)
  - Summer (DST): UTC+4:30 (IRDT)

Sartipabad (Persian: سرتيپ آباد, also Romanized as Sartīpābād) is a village in Badr Rural District, in the Central District of Qorveh County, Kurdistan Province, Iran. At the 2006 census, its population was 171, in 46 families. The village is populated by Kurds.
