= Kabud Khani =

Kabud Khani (Persian: كبودخاني), also rendered as Kabudkhaneh, may refer to:

- Kabud Khani-ye Olya
- Kabud Khani-ye Sofla
