= Khoshkamrud-e Olya =

Khoshkamrud-e Olya خشكمرودعليا
- Village
- Location within Iran
- Coordinates: 35°18′48″N 47°38′31″E
- Country: Iran
- Province: Kurdistan
- County: Qorveh
- Bakhsh: Serishabad
- Rural District: Yalghuz Aghaj

Population (2006)
  - Total: 70
- Time zone: UTC+3:30 (IRST)
  - Summer (DST): UTC+4:30 (IRDT)

Khoshkamrud-e Olya (Persian: خشكمرودعليا, also Romanized as Khoshkamrūd-e ‘Olyā and Khoshkemrūd-e ‘Olyā; also known as Ḩavārī, Khoshkamrūd-e Bālā, Khoshkeh Marrūd-e ‘Olyā, Khoshkeh Marūd, Khushgeh Marūd, Khushgeh Matūd, and Voshkamarū-ye Bālā) is a village in Yalghuz Aghaj Rural District, Serishabad District, Qorveh County, Kurdistan Province, Iran. At the 2006 census, its population was 70, in 16 families. The village is populated by Kurds.
