= Khoshkamrud =

Khoshkamrud or Khoshkemrud (Persian: خشكمرود), also rendered as Khoshkeh Marrud or Khoshkeh Marud or Khushgeh Marud, also known as Voshkamaru, may refer to:

- Khoshkamrud-e Olya
- Khoshkamrud-e Sofla
