= Kani Chay =

Kani Chay or Kani Chai (Persian: كاني چاي) may refer to:

- Kani Chay, Divandarreh
- Kani Chay, Qorveh
