= Dash Kasan, Kurdistan =

Dash Kasan داش كسان
- Village
- Location within Iran
- Coordinates: 35°10′31″N 48°05′33″E
- Country: Iran
- Province: Kurdistan
- County: Qorveh
- Bakhsh: Chaharduli
- Rural District: Chaharduli-ye Sharqi

Population (2006)
  - Total: 359
- Time zone: UTC+3:30 (IRST)
  - Summer (DST): UTC+4:30 (IRDT)

Dash Kasan (Persian: داش كسان, also Romanized as Dāsh Kasan and also known as Dasht Kasān) is a village in Chaharduli-ye Sharqi Rural District, Chaharduli District, Qorveh County, Kurdistan Province, Iran. At the 2006 census, its population was 359, in 80 families. The village is populated by Azerbaijanis.
