= Kakuy-e Olya =

Kakuy-e Olya كاكوي عليا
- Village
- Location within Iran
- Coordinates: 35°04′47″N 47°26′23″E
- Country: Iran
- Province: Kurdistan
- County: Qorveh
- Bakhsh: Central
- Rural District: Panjeh Ali-ye Jonubi

Population (2006)
  - Total: 179
- Time zone: UTC+3:30 (IRST)
  - Summer (DST): UTC+4:30 (IRDT)

Kakuy-e Olya (Persian: كاكوي عليا, also Romanized as Kākūy-e ‘Olyā; also known as Kāhku, Kākū-ye Bālā, and Kākū-ye ‘Olyā) is a village in Panjeh Ali-ye Jonubi Rural District, in the Central District of Qorveh County, Kurdistan Province, Iran. At the 2006 census, its population was 179, in 43 families. The village is populated by Kurds.
