= David Lale =

David Lale may refer to:

- David Lale (Australian cellist) (born 1962)
- David Lale (British cellist) (born 1981)
