= Chahar Gah, Kurdistan =

Chahar Gah چهارگاه
- Village
- Location within Iran
- Coordinates: 35°16′26″N 47°39′50″E
- Country: Iran
- Province: Kurdistan
- County: Qorveh
- Bakhsh: Serishabad
- Rural District: Yalghuz Aghaj

Population (2024)
  - Total: 1
- Time zone: UTC+3:30 (IRST)
  - Summer (DST): UTC+4:30 (IRDT)

Chahar Gah (Persian: چهارگاه, also Romanized as Chahār Gāh; also known as Chahār Gāv, Chuār Gao, and Chūār Gā’ū) is an abandoned village in Yalghuz Aghaj Rural District, Serishabad District, Qorveh County, Kurdistan Province, Iran. At the 2024 census, its population is 1, in 0 families. The village is populated by Kurds.
