= Kabud Khani-ye Olya =

Kabud Khani-ye Olya كبودخاني عليا
- Village
- Location within Iran
- Coordinates: 35°09′58″N 47°27′17″E
- Country: Iran
- Province: Kurdistan
- County: Qorveh
- Bakhsh: Central
- Rural District: Panjeh Ali-ye Jonubi

Population (2006)
  - Total: 371
- Time zone: UTC+3:30 (IRST)
  - Summer (DST): UTC+4:30 (IRDT)

Kabud Khani-ye Olya (Persian: كبودخاني عليا, also Romanized as Kabūd Khānī-ye ‘Olyā; also known as Kabūdkhāneh, Kabūd Khānī, and Kabūd Khānī-ye Bālā) is a village in Panjeh Ali-ye Jonubi Rural District, in the Central District of Qorveh County, Kurdistan Province, Iran. At the 2006 census, its population was 371, in 85 families. The village is populated by Kurds.
