= Meymanatabad, Kurdistan =

Meymanatabad ميمنت آباد
- Village
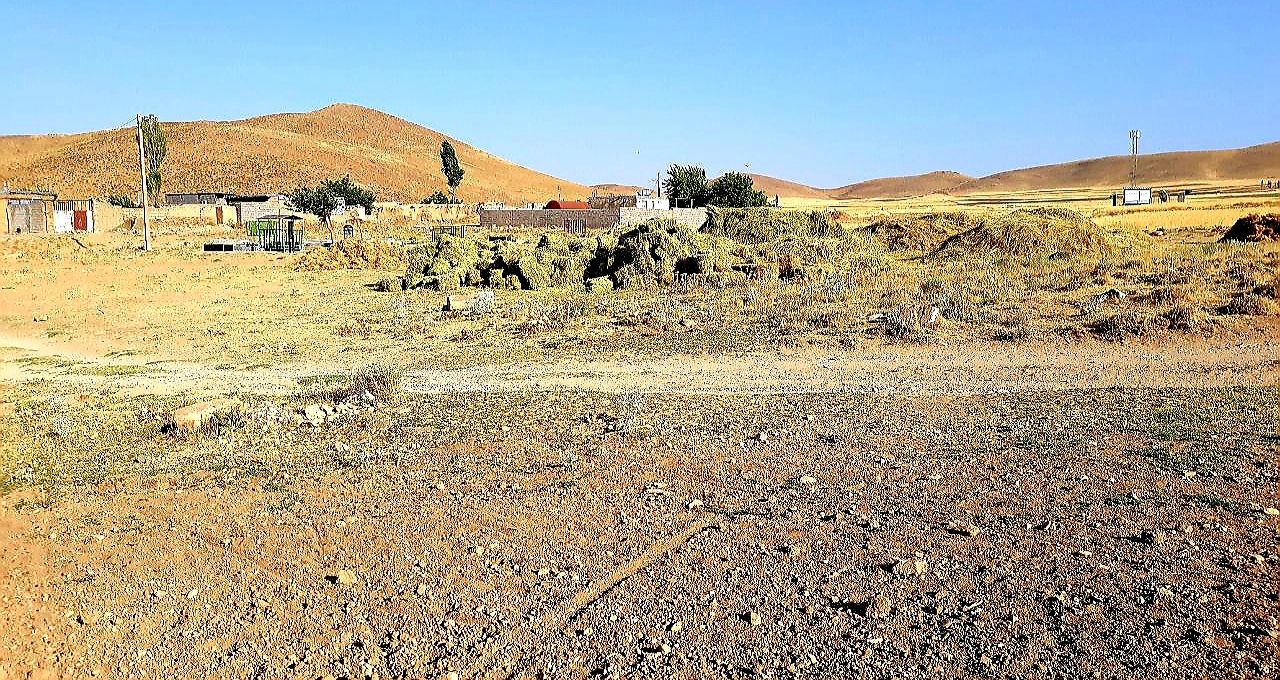
- Meymanatabad, Kurdistan

- Location within Iran
- Coordinates: 35°03′06″N 47°54′21″E
- Country: Iran
- Province: Kurdistan
- County: Qorveh
- Bakhsh: Chaharduli
- Rural District: Chaharduli-ye Gharbi

Population (2006)
  - Total: 143
- Time zone: UTC+3:30 (IRST)
  - Summer (DST): UTC+4:30 (IRDT)

Meymanatabad (Persian: ميمنت آباد, also Romanized as Meymanatābād; also known as Mehnatabād) is a village in Chaharduli-ye Gharbi Rural District, Chaharduli District, Qorveh County, Kurdistan Province, Iran. At the 2006 census, its population was 143, in 33 families. The village is populated by Kurds.
