= Moshir Aba-ye Panjeh =

Moshir Aba-ye Panjeh مشير آبا پنجه
- Village
- Location within Iran
- Coordinates: 35°04′50″N 47°30′44″E
- Country: Iran
- Province: Kurdistan
- County: Qorveh
- Bakhsh: Central
- Rural District: Panjeh Ali-ye Jonubi

Population (2006)
  - Total: 154
- Time zone: UTC+3:30 (IRST)
  - Summer (DST): UTC+4:30 (IRDT)

Moshir Aba-ye Panjeh (Persian: مشير آبا پنجه, also Romanized as Moshīr Ābā-ye Panjeh; also known as Moshīrābād-e Panjeh) is a village in Panjeh Ali-ye Jonubi Rural District, in the Central District of Qorveh County, Kurdistan Province, Iran. At the 2006 census, its population was 154, in 31 families. The village is populated by Kurds.
