= Asefabad =

Asefabad or Asafabad (Persian: اصف اباد) may refer to:

- Asefabad, Fars
- Asefabad, Kurdistan
- Asefabad, Razavi Khorasan
