= Vey Nesar =

Village in Kurdistan province, Iran

Vey Nesar Persian: وينسار
- Village
- Location within Iran Location within Iran Kurdistan
- Coordinates: 35°01′37″N 48°04′49″E
- Country: Iran
- Province: Kurdistan
- County: Qorveh
- District: Chaharduli
- Rural District: Chaharduli-ye Sharqi

Population (2016)
  - Total: 2,350
- Time zone: UTC+3:30 (IRST)

Vey Nesar (Persian: وينسار) (Note: Also romanized as Vey Nesār, Vīnesār, and Vīnsar; also known as Wanesār) is a village in, and the capital of, Chaharduli-ye Sharqi Rural District of Chaharduli District, Qorveh County, Kurdistan province, Iran.

== Demographics ==
=== Language ===
Linguistic composition of the village:

Vey Nesar linguistic composition
language	percent
Southern Kurdish	95%
New Persian	3%
Azerbaijani	2%

=== Population ===
At the time of the 2006 National Census, the village's population was 2,249 in 547 households. The following census in 2011 counted 2,362 people in 632 households. The 2016 census measured the population of the village as 2,350 people in 683 households. It was the most populous village in its rural district.
