= Qujaq =

Qujaq قوجاق
- Village
- Location within Iran
- Coordinates: 35°11′35″N 48°00′52″E
- Country: Iran
- Province: Kurdistan
- County: Qorveh
- Bakhsh: Central
- Rural District: Delbaran

Population (2006)
  - Total: 440
- Time zone: UTC+3:30 (IRST)
  - Summer (DST): UTC+4:30 (IRDT)

Qujaq (Persian: قوجاق, also Romanized as Qūjāq; also known as Qūchāq and Qujākh) is a village in Delbaran Rural District, in the Central District of Qorveh County, Kurdistan Province, Iran. At the 2006 census, its population was 440, in 100 families. The village is populated by Kurds.
