= Kani Ganji =

Village in Kurdistan province, Iran

Kani Ganji Persian: كاني گنجي
- Village
- Location within Iran Location within Iran Kurdistan
- Coordinates: 35°13′32″N 47°36′11″E
- Country: Iran
- Province: Kurdistan
- County: Qorveh
- District: Central
- Rural District: Panjeh Ali-ye Shomali

Population (2016)
  - Total: 588
- Time zone: UTC+3:30 (IRST)

Kani Ganji (Persian: كاني گنجي) (Note: Also romanized as Kānī Ganjī; also known as Ganjī, Kān Ganjī, and Kānī Ganjeh) is a village in, and the capital of, Panjeh Ali-ye Shomali Rural District (Note: Formerly Panjeh Ali Rural District) of the Central District of Qorveh County, Kurdistan province, Iran.

== Demographics ==
=== Ethnicity ===
The village is populated by Kurds.

=== Population ===
At the time of the 2006 National Census, the village's population was 584 in 143 households. The following census in 2011 counted 632 people in 175 households. The 2016 census measured the population of the village as 588 people in 180 households.
