= Kani Chay, Qorveh =

Kani Chay كاني چاي
- Village
- Location within Iran
- Coordinates: 35°16′38″N 47°36′08″E
- Country: Iran
- Province: Kurdistan
- County: Qorveh
- Bakhsh: Serishabad
- Rural District: Yalghuz Aghaj

Population (2006)
  - Total: 107
- Time zone: UTC+3:30 (IRST)
  - Summer (DST): UTC+4:30 (IRDT)

Kani Chay (Persian: كاني چاي, also Romanized as Kānī Chāy; also known as Kānī Chā’ī) is a village in Yalghuz Aghaj Rural District, Serishabad District, Qorveh County, Kurdistan Province, Iran. At the 2006 census, its population was 107, in 26 families. The village is populated by Kurds.
