= Meyham-e Olya =

Meyham-e Olya ميهم عليا
- Village
- Location within Iran
- Coordinates: 35°03′47″N 47°51′40″E
- Country: Iran
- Province: Kurdistan
- County: Qorveh
- Bakhsh: Chaharduli
- Rural District: Chaharduli-ye Gharbi

Population (2006)
  - Total: 800
- Time zone: UTC+3:30 (IRST)
  - Summer (DST): UTC+4:30 (IRDT)

Meyham-e Olya (Persian: ميهم عليا, also Romanized as Meyham-e ‘Olyā; also known as Meham and Meyham-e Bālā) is a village in Chaharduli-ye Gharbi Rural District, Chaharduli District, Qorveh County, Kurdistan Province, Iran. At the 2006 census, its population was 800, in 180 families. The village is populated by Kurds.
