= Shadiabad, Kurdistan =

Shadiabad شادي آباد
- Village
- Location within Iran
- Coordinates: 35°28′28″N 47°46′30″E
- Country: Iran
- Province: Kurdistan
- County: Qorveh
- Bakhsh: Serishabad
- Rural District: Lak

Population (2006)
  - Total: 117
- Time zone: UTC+3:30 (IRST)
  - Summer (DST): UTC+4:30 (IRDT)

Shadiabad (Persian: شادي آباد, also Romanized as Shādīābād) is a village in Lak Rural District, Serishabad District, Qorveh County, Kurdistan Province, Iran. At the 2006 census, its population was 117, in 27 families.

The village is populated by Kurds.

Shadiabad was named by the Afghan sultans of Malwa. Shadiabad means "The city of happiness"
