= Seylab, Kurdistan =

Seylab سيلاب
- Village
- Location within Iran
- Coordinates: 35°22′45″N 47°42′00″E
- Country: Iran
- Province: Kurdistan
- County: Qorveh
- Bakhsh: Serishabad
- Rural District: Lak

Population (2006)
  - Total: 387
- Time zone: UTC+3:30 (IRST)
  - Summer (DST): UTC+4:30 (IRDT)

Seylab (Persian: سيلاب, also Romanized as Seylāb and Sailab; also known as Esfandābād) is a village in Lak Rural District, Serishabad District, Qorveh County, Kurdistan Province, Iran. At the 2006 census, its population was 387, in 90 families. The village is populated by Kurds.
