= Meyham =

Meyham (Persian: ميهم), also rendered as Meham, may refer to:

- Meyham-e Olya
- Meyham-e Sofla
