= Balvaneh-ye Khaledi =

Balvaneh-ye Khaledi بالوانه خالدي
- Village
- Location within Iran
- Coordinates: 35°08′24″N 47°35′34″E
- Country: Iran
- Province: Kurdistan
- County: Qorveh
- Bakhsh: Central
- Rural District: Panjeh Ali

Population (2006)
  - Total: 161
- Time zone: UTC+3:30 (IRST)
  - Summer (DST): UTC+4:30 (IRDT)

Balvaneh-ye Khaledi (Persian: بالوانه خالدي, also Romanized as Bālvāneh-ye Khāledī; also known as Balīāneh, Baliyāna, Bālvāneh, and Bālvāneh-ye Khāledīān) is a village in Panjeh Ali Rural District, in the Central District of Qorveh County, Kurdistan Province, Iran. At the 2006 census, its population was 161, in 33 families. The village is populated by Kurds.
