= Meymanatabad =

Meymanatabad (Persian: ميمنت اباد) may refer to:

- Meymanatabad, Kurdistan
- Meymanatabad, Tehran
