= Yalquz Aghaj =

Yalquz Aghaj (Persian: يالقوزاغاج), also rendered as Yalquz Aqaj, may refer to:

- Yalquz Aghaj, Marand, East Azerbaijan Province
- Yalquz Aghaj, Meyaneh, East Azerbaijan Province
- Yalquz Aghaj, Kurdistan
- Yalquz Aghaj, West Azerbaijan
