= Meyham-e Sofla =

Village in Kurdistan province, Iran

Meyham-e Sofla Persian: ميهم سفلي
- Village
- Location within Iran Location within Iran Kurdistan
- Coordinates: 35°03′22″N 47°53′21″E
- Country: Iran
- Province: Kurdistan
- County: Qorveh
- District: Chaharduli
- Rural District: Chaharduli-ye Gharbi

Population (2016)
  - Total: 1,422
- Time zone: UTC+3:30 (IRST)

Meyham-e Sofla (Persian: ميهم سفلي) (Note: Also romanized as Meyham-e Soflá; also known as Mehām, Meham-e Soflá, and Meyham-e Pā’īn) is a village in Chaharduli-ye Gharbi Rural District (Note: Formerly Chaharduli Rural District) of Chaharduli District, Qorveh County, Kurdistan province, Iran.

== Demographics ==
=== Ethnicity ===
The village is populated by Kurds.

=== Population ===
At the time of the 2006 National Census, the village's population was 1,282 in 284 households. The following census in 2011 counted 1,406 people in 386 households. The 2016 census measured the population of the village as 1,422 people in 422 households. It was the most populous village in its rural district.
