= Kangaru =

Kangaru may refer to:

- Kangaru, Iran
- Kangaru, Kurdistan, Iran
- Kangaru, Kenya
- "Kangaru", a track from the score for the 2016 film Arrival

== See also ==
- Kangaroo
