= Jameh Shuran-e Sofla =

Jameh Shuran-e Sofla (Persian: جامه شوران سفلي) may refer to:

- Jameh Shuran-e Sofla, Kermanshah
- Jameh Shuran-e Sofla, Mahidasht, Kermanshah Province
