= Mizin =

Mizin may refer to:

- Serhiy Mizin (born 1972), Ukrainian footballer
- Mizin, Iran (disambiguation), places in Iran
