= Hasan Khan =

Hasan Khan (Persian: حسن خان) may refer to:

== Places ==
- Hasan Khan, Golestan, a village in Iran
- Hasan Khan, Kurdistan, a village in Iran
- Tomb of Hasan Khan Suri, Suri dynasty tomb in Sasaram, Bihar, India

== People ==
- Hasan Khan (cricketer) (born 1998), Pakistani cricketer
- Hasan Imam Khan (born 1971), Bangladeshi politician

== See also ==
- Hassan Khan (disambiguation)
