= Mejin =

Mejin مجين
- Village
- Location within Iran
- Coordinates: 35°10′25″N 47°56′50″E
- Country: Iran
- Province: Kurdistan
- County: Qorveh
- Bakhsh: Central
- Rural District: Delbaran

Population (2006)
  - Total: 236
- Time zone: UTC+3:30 (IRST)
  - Summer (DST): UTC+4:30 (IRDT)

Mejin (Persian: مجين, also Romanized as Mejīn and Majīn; also known as Mīzīn) is a village in Delbaran Rural District, in the Central District of Qorveh County, Kurdistan Province, Iran. At the 2006 census, its population was 236, in 53 families. The village is populated by Kurds.
