= Kakuy =

Kakuy (Persian: كاكوي), also rendered as Kahku or Kaku, may refer to:

- Kakuy-e Olya
- Kakuy-e Sofla
