= Mahdi Khan =

Mahdi Khan or Mehdi Khan or Mehdikhan (Persian: مهدي خان) may refer to:

- Mehdikhan, Kurdistan
- Mahdi Khan, Lorestan
