= Kangareh, Qorveh =

Kangareh كنگره
- Village
- Location within Iran
- Coordinates: 35°08′03″N 47°32′03″E
- Country: Iran
- Province: Kurdistan
- County: Qorveh
- Bakhsh: Central
- Rural District: Panjeh Ali-ye Jonubi

Population (2006)
  - Total: 829
- Time zone: UTC+3:30 (IRST)
  - Summer (DST): UTC+4:30 (IRDT)

Kangareh (Persian: كنگره; also known as Kangarū) is a village in Panjeh Ali-ye Jonubi Rural District, in the Central District of Qorveh County, Kurdistan Province, Iran. At the 2006 census, its population was 829, in 197 families. The village is populated by Kurds.
