= Jameh Shuran-e Olya =

Jameh Shuran-e Olya (Persian: جامه شوران عليا) may refer to:

- Jameh Shuran-e Olya, Kermanshah
- Jameh Shuran-e Olya, Mahidasht, Kermanshah Province
