= Borakay =

Borakay Kurds
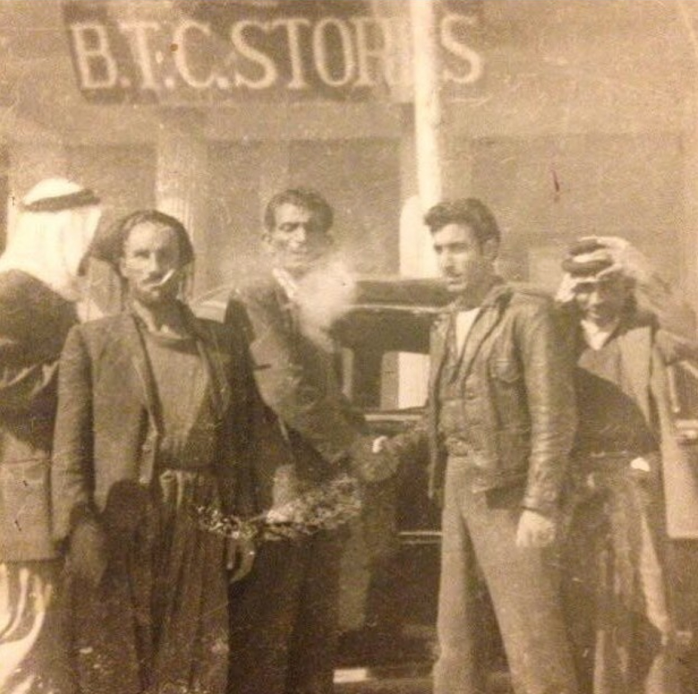
- Ethnicity: Kurdish
- Location: Kuwait, Iraq, Iran and Russia
- Language: Central Kurdish (Ardalani)
- Religion: Sunni Islam

Borakay (Kurdish: بۆرەکەیی; also Borakay, Borakey, Borekey, Borekei) is a small Kurdish tribe found in Iran, Iraq and Kuwait

== Geographic distribution ==
The Borakays in Kuwait mainly reside in the Hawalli Governorate in Kuwait, particularly Al-Naqra, where there is a roundabout named after the Borakay Kurds (Al-Kurd roundabout) A large number of them served in the army, police, important companies, and various government jobs before departing following the Gulf War. most of them relocated to Denmark and the UK.

== Origins ==
According to Sarlashkar Mozaffar Zanganeh, in the mid 20th century the Poraka, which is an alternative spelling of Borakay, were 450 families inhabiting Sarpol-e-Zahab, Lilak, Esfandabad and the Hasanabad area of Sanandaj. These areas are situated within modern Kurdistan province and the Kermanshah province of Iran. They also had a presence in Iraq, and are considered part of the Mendemi tribe.

According to some sources, Borakays are part of the Jaff Confederation. However, this claim is questionable

According to Sadegh Safizadeh, the Borakays claim to be the descendants of the Sassanids and trace their lineage through Khosrow II. Furthermore, he claims that Borakays are native to Shahrizor, Zahab and Lilaq.

== Notable members ==
- Sadegh Safizadeh, a famous Iranian Kurdish poet
- Farough Safizadeh, a Kurdish academic
