= Takiya =

Takiya may refer to:

- Takya, a type of Islamic building
- Taqiyya, dissimulation in Islam
- Takiya, Iran, a village in Khuzestan Province, Iran
- Bazmaghbyur, Armenia
- Taqiyah (cap)
