= Yalghuz Aghaj =

Village in Kurdistan province, Iran

Yalghuz Aghaj Persian: يالغوز آغاج
- Village
- Location within Iran Location within Iran Kurdistan
- Coordinates: 35°17′57″N 47°35′41″E
- Country: Iran
- Province: Kurdistan
- County: Qorveh
- District: Serishabad
- Rural District: Yalghuz Aghaj

Population (2016)
  - Total: 1,113
- Time zone: UTC+3:30 (IRST)

Yalghuz Aghaj (Persian: يالغوز آغاج) (Note: Also romanized as Yālghūz Āghāj; also known as Ālūzāqaj, Holzāqāch, Huluzagach, Yalghuz Aghach, Yalqūz Aghāj, Yālqūz Āghāj, and Yalqūz Āqāj) is a village in, and the capital of, Yalghuz Aghaj Rural District of Serishabad District, (Note: Formerly Talvar District) Qorveh County, Kurdistan province, Iran.

== Demographics ==
=== Ethnicity ===
The village is populated by Kurds.

=== Population ===
At the time of the 2006 National Census, the village's population was 1,123 in 256 households. The following census in 2011 counted 1,178 people in 325 households. The 2016 census measured the population of the village as 1,113 people in 348 households. It was the most populous village in its rural district.
