= Nuray =

- Gender: Female

Origin
- Origin: Arabic or Greenlandic (unrelated)

Other names
- Alternative spelling: Nurai

Nuray is a feminine given name of Turkish origin meaning "bright moon." It is among the most popular names given to baby girls in Azerbaijan in 2007.

== Given name ==
- Nuray Deliktaş (born 1971), Turkish female taekwondo coach and former practitioner
- Nuray Güngör (born 2000), Turkish weightlifter
- Nuray Hafiftaş (born 1964), Turkish folk singer
- Nuray Lale (born 1962), Turkish-German writer and translator
- Nuray Levent (born 2000), Turkish weightlifter
- Nuray Mert (born 1960), Turkish journalist
