= Chaharduli Rural District =

Chaharduli Rural District (Persian: دهستان چهاردولي) may refer to:

- Chaharduli Rural District (Hamadan Province)
- Chaharduli Rural District (Shahin Dezh County), West Azerbaijan province

== See also ==
- Chaharduli-ye Gharbi Rural District, Kurdistan province
- Chaharduli-ye Sharqi Rural District, Kurdistan province
