= Dezej =

City in Kurdistan province, Iran

Dezej Persian: دزج
- City
- Location within Iran Location within Iran Kurdistan
- Coordinates: 35°03′47″N 47°57′57″E
- Country: Iran
- Province: Kurdistan
- County: Qorveh
- District: Chaharduli

Population (2016)
  - Total: 2,219
- Time zone: UTC+3:30 (IRST)

Dezej (Persian: دزج) (Note: Also romanized as Dezaj; also known as Dīzaj and Dīzeh) is a city in, and the capital of, Chaharduli District of Qorveh County, Kurdistan province, Iran. It also serves as the administrative center for Chaharduli-ye Gharbi Rural District. (Note: Formerly Chaharduli Rural District)

== Demographics ==
=== Ethnicity ===
The city is populated by Kurds.

=== Population ===
At the time of the 2006 National Census, the city's population was 2,292 in 559 households. The following census in 2011 counted 2,290 people in 633 households. The 2016 census measured the population of the city as 2,219 people in 666 households.
