= Hassan Khan =

Hassan Khan may refer to:

- Hassan Khan (politician) (1936–2024), Indian politician from Ladakh
- Hassan Khan (artist) (born 1975), British-born Egyptian multimedia artist, musician, and writer
- Hassan Khan (cricketer) (born 1998), Pakistani cricketer
- Gul Hassan Khan (1921–1999), Pakistani army commander-in-chief

== See also ==
- Hasan Khan (disambiguation)
