= Mizin, Iran =

Mizin (Persian: ميزين) in Iran may refer to:

- Mizin, Ardabil
- Mizin, Kurdistan
