= Serishabad =

City in Kurdistan province, Iran

Serishabad Persian: سريش آباد
- City
- Location within Iran Location within Iran Kurdistan
- Coordinates: 35°14′58″N 47°46′44″E
- Country: Iran
- Province: Kurdistan
- County: Qorveh
- District: Serishabad

Population (2016)
  - Total: 7,196
- Time zone: UTC+3:30 (IRST)

Serishabad (Persian: سريش آباد) (Note: Also romanized as Serīshābād; also known as Sehrīshābād) is a city in, and the capital of, Serishabad District (Note: Formerly Talvar District) of Qorveh County, Kurdistan province, Iran.

== Demographics ==
=== Language ===
Linguistic composition of the city.

Serishabad linguistic composition
language	percent
Turkic	95%
New Persian	4%
Southern Kurdish	1%

=== Population ===
At the time of the 2006 National Census, the city's population was 6,563 in 1,742 households. The following census in 2011 counted 7,194 people in 2,147 households. The 2016 census measured the population of the city as 7,196 people in 2,312 households.
