= Mazhin, Eyvan =

Mazhin ماژين
- Village
- Location within Iran
- Coordinates: 33°48′54″N 46°15′49″E
- Country: Iran
- Province: Ilam
- County: Eyvan
- Bakhsh: Central
- Rural District: Nabovat

Population (2006)
  - Total: 66
- Time zone: UTC+3:30 (IRST)
  - Summer (DST): UTC+4:30 (IRDT)

Mazhin (Persian: ماژين, also Romanized as Māzhīn and Mājin) is a village in Nabovat Rural District, in the Central District of Eyvan County, Ilam province, Iran. At the 2006 census, its population was 66, in 14 families. The village is populated by Kurds.
