= Tekeyeh Taviran-e Sofla =

Tekeyeh Taviran-e Sofla تكيه طاويران سفلي
- Village
- Location within Iran
- Coordinates: 34°02′10″N 47°01′12″E
- Country: Iran
- Province: Kermanshah
- County: Kermanshah
- Bakhsh: Firuzabad
- Rural District: Sar Firuzabad

Population (2006)
  - Total: 114
- Time zone: UTC+3:30 (IRST)
  - Summer (DST): UTC+4:30 (IRDT)

Tekeyeh Taviran-e Sofla (Persian: تكيه طاويران سفلي, also Romanized as Tekeyeh-ye Ţāvīrān-e Soflá; also known as Tekeyeh-ye Soflá) is a village in Sar Firuzabad Rural District, Firuzabad District, Kermanshah County, Kermanshah Province, Iran. At the 2006 census, its population was 114, in 20 families.
