= Kaku, Rõuge Parish =

Village in Estonia

- Village
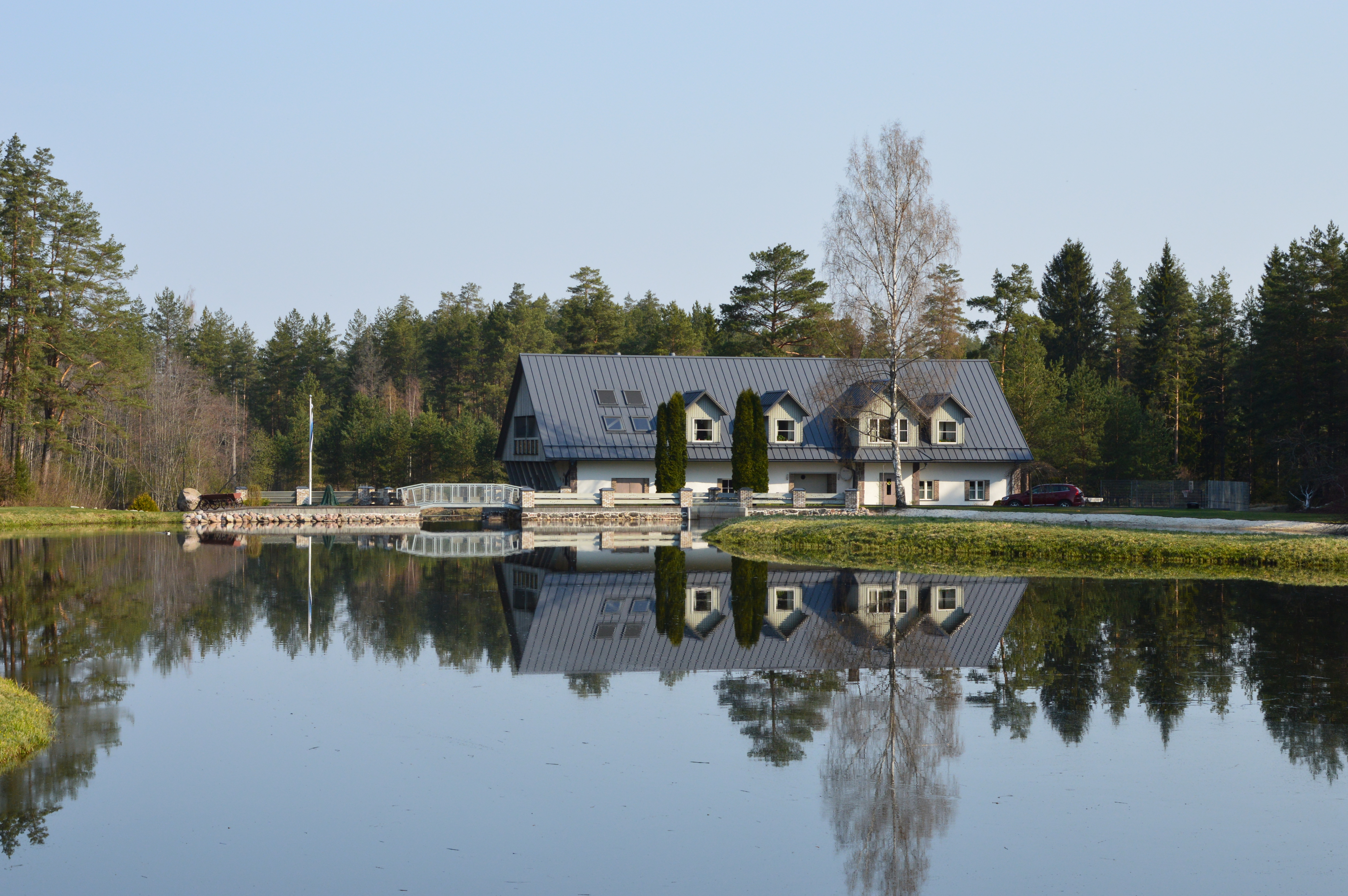
- Former Kaku water mill

- Location within Estonia
- Coordinates: 57.788611111111°N 26.896666666667°E
- Country: Estonia
- County: Võru County
- Parish: Rõuge Parish
- Time zone: UTC+2 (EET)
  - Summer (DST): UTC+3 (EEST)

Kaku is a village in Rõuge Parish, Võru County in Estonia.
