= Moshirabad, Tabriz =

Moshirabad مشيراباد
- Village
- Location within Iran
- Coordinates: 38°27′31″N 46°26′53″E
- Country: Iran
- Province: East Azerbaijan
- County: Tabriz
- Bakhsh: Central
- Rural District: Esperan

Population (2006)
  - Total: 66
- Time zone: UTC+3:30 (IRST)
  - Summer (DST): UTC+4:30 (IRDT)

Moshirabad (Persian: مشيراباد, also Romanized as Moshīrābād; also known as Mushurābād and Shaitanābād) is a village in Esperan Rural District, in the Central District of Tabriz County, East Azerbaijan Province, Iran. At the 2006 census, its population was 66, in 16 families.
