= Quchaq, Divandarreh =

Quchaq قوچاق
- Village
- Location within Iran
- Coordinates: 36°11′35″N 47°00′33″E
- Country: Iran
- Province: Kurdistan
- County: Divandarreh
- Bakhsh: Karaftu
- Rural District: Kani Shirin

Population (2006)
  - Total: 361
- Time zone: UTC+3:30 (IRST)
  - Summer (DST): UTC+4:30 (IRDT)

Quchaq (Persian: قوچاق, also Romanized as Qūchāq; also known as Qūjāq) is a village in Kani Shirin Rural District, Karaftu District, Divandarreh County, Kurdistan Province, Iran. At the 2006 census, its population was 361, in 76 families. The village is populated by Kurds.
