= Sartipabad, Kermanshah =

Sartipabad سرتيپاباد
- Village
- Location within Iran
- Coordinates: 34°35′47″N 46°55′27″E
- Country: Iran
- Province: Kermanshah
- County: Kermanshah
- Bakhsh: Central
- Rural District: Miyan Darband

Population (2006)
  - Total: 234
- Time zone: UTC+3:30 (IRST)
  - Summer (DST): UTC+4:30 (IRDT)

Sartipabad (Persian: سرتيپاباد, also Romanized as Sartīpābād) is a village in Miyan Darband Rural District, in the Central District of Kermanshah County, Kermanshah Province, Iran. At the 2006 census, its population was 234, in 52 families.
