= Tughan al-Nasiri =

Amir Sayf al-Din Tughan ibn Abd Allah al-Nasiri (died 1415) was a Mamluk prince and warrior under the reign of Sultan al-Nasir Faraj (r. 1399–1411 C.E.). He was known as al-Majnun (The Crazy) and was Amir of Ten, which was a higher officer rank in the Mamluk Sultanate.

He was a brave warrior and was installed as a high rank officer. During the end of his reign Sultan al-Nasir became a tyrannical ruler which eventually led him into his seventh and final conflict with the Syrian Emirs at Baalbek. Amir Tughan was with him in the war against Amir Shaykh and Amir Nawroz in 814 H.E./1441 C.E. Defeated in battle Sultan al-Nasir fled to the citadel of Damascus. Unable to escape, the sultan surrendered and was killed.

In 816 H.E./1443 C.E. Tughan rebelled against Shaykh who enthroned himself in Cairo on 6 November 1412 and assumed the title Sultan al-Mu'ayyad. Tughan was later captured and sent to Alexandria together with other amirs and was killed there in 818 H.E./1415 C.E.
