= Jameh Shuran-e Olya, Mahidasht =

Jameh Shuran-e Olya جامه شوران عليا
- Village
- Country: Iran
- Province: Kermanshah
- County: Kermanshah
- Bakhsh: Mahidasht
- Rural District: Mahidasht

Population (2006)
  - Total: 321
- Time zone: UTC+3:30 (IRST)
  - Summer (DST): UTC+4:30 (IRDT)

Jameh Shuran-e Olya (Persian: جامه شوران عليا, also Romanized as Jāmeh Shūrān-e ‘Olyā) is a village in Mahidasht Rural District, Mahidasht District, Kermanshah County, Kermanshah Province, Iran. At the 2006 census, its population was 321, in 91 families.
