= Jameh Shuran-e Sofla, Kermanshah =

Jameh Shuran-e Sofla جامه شوران سفلي
- Village
- Location within Iran
- Coordinates: 34°10′24″N 47°19′33″E
- Country: Iran
- Province: Kermanshah
- County: Kermanshah
- Bakhsh: Central
- Rural District: Qarah Su

Population (2006)
  - Total: 191
- Time zone: UTC+3:30 (IRST)
  - Summer (DST): UTC+4:30 (IRDT)

Jameh Shuran-e Sofla (Persian: جامه شوران سفلي, also Romanized as Jāmeh Shūrān-e Soflá) is a village in Qarah Su Rural District, in the Central District of Kermanshah County, Kermanshah Province, Iran. At the 2006 census, its population was 191, in 38 families.
