= Kongereh, Kamyaran =

Kongereh كنگره
- Village
- Location within Iran
- Coordinates: 34°57′05″N 47°00′53″E
- Country: Iran
- Province: Kurdistan
- County: Kamyaran
- Bakhsh: Muchesh
- Rural District: Sursur

Population (2006)
  - Total: 108
- Time zone: UTC+3:30 (IRST)
  - Summer (DST): UTC+4:30 (IRDT)

Kongereh (Persian: كنگره, also Romanized as Kangareh, Kangrah, and Kongerah; also known as Kang-i-Rah) is a village in Sursur Rural District, Muchesh District, Kamyaran County, Kurdistan Province, Iran. At the 2006 census, its population was 108, in 28 families. The village is populated by Kurds.
