= Asefabad, Fars =

Asefabad اصف اباد
- Village
- Country: Iran
- Province: Fars
- County: Shiraz
- Bakhsh: Zarqan
- Rural District: Rahmatabad

Population (2006)
  - Total: 112
- Time zone: UTC+3:30 (IRST)
  - Summer (DST): UTC+4:30 (IRDT)

Asefabad (Persian: اصف اباد, also Romanized as Āşefābād) is a village in Rahmatabad Rural District, Zarqan District, Shiraz County, Fars province, Iran. At the 2006 census, its population was 112, in 30 families.
