= Dash Kasan, Chaldoran =

Dash Kasan داشكسن
- Village
- Location within Iran
- Coordinates: 39°02′18″N 44°39′57″E
- Country: Iran
- Province: West Azerbaijan
- County: Chaldoran
- Bakhsh: Central
- Rural District: Baba Jik

Population (2006)
  - Total: 30
- Time zone: UTC+3:30 (IRST)
  - Summer (DST): UTC+4:30 (IRDT)

Dash Kasan (Persian: داشكسن, also Romanized as Dāsh Kasan) is a village in Baba Jik Rural District, in the Central District of Chaldoran County, West Azerbaijan Province, Iran. At the 2006 census, its population was 30, in 6 families.
