= Kani Chay, Divandarreh =

Kani Chay كاني چاي
- Village
- Location within Iran
- Coordinates: 36°06′33″N 47°00′00″E
- Country: Iran
- Province: Kurdistan
- County: Divandarreh
- Bakhsh: Karaftu
- Rural District: Zarrineh

Population (2006)
  - Total: 512
- Time zone: UTC+3:30 (IRST)
  - Summer (DST): UTC+4:30 (IRDT)

Kani Chay (Persian: كاني چاي, also Romanized as Kānī Chāy; also known as Kānī Chā‘ī) is a village in Zarrineh Rural District, Karaftu District, Divandarreh County, Kurdistan Province, Iran. At the 2006 census, its population was 512, in 91 families. The village is populated by Kurds.
