= Do Sar, Bijar =

Do Sar دوسر
- Village
- Location within Iran
- Coordinates: 35°31′30″N 47°42′03″E
- Country: Iran
- Province: Kurdistan
- County: Bijar
- Bakhsh: Chang Almas
- Rural District: Khosrowabad

Population (2006)
  - Total: 98
- Time zone: UTC+3:30 (IRST)
  - Summer (DST): UTC+4:30 (IRDT)

Do Sar (Persian: دوسر, also Romanized as Dowsar and Dūsar) is a village in Khosrowabad Rural District, Chang Almas District, Bijar County, Kurdistan province, Iran. At the 2006 census, its population was 98, in 20 families. The village is populated by Kurds.
