= Do Sar, Lorestan =

Do Sar دوسر
- Village
- Location within Iran
- Coordinates: 33°41′34″N 48°49′42″E
- Country: Iran
- Province: Lorestan
- County: Dorud
- Bakhsh: Silakhor
- Rural District: Chalanchulan

Population (2006)
  - Total: 272
- Time zone: UTC+3:30 (IRST)
  - Summer (DST): UTC+4:30 (IRDT)

Do Sar (Persian: دوسر, also Romanized as Dūsar, Dow Sar, and Do Sareh) is a village in Chalanchulan Rural District, Silakhor District, Dorud County, Lorestan Province, Iran. At the 2006 census, its population was 272, in 62 families.
