= Takyeh, Hamadan =

Takyeh تكيه
- Village
- Location within Iran
- Coordinates: 35°21′21″N 49°01′57″E
- Country: Iran
- Province: Hamadan
- County: Razan
- Bakhsh: Central
- Rural District: Razan

Population (2006)
  - Total: 348
- Time zone: UTC+3:30 (IRST)
  - Summer (DST): UTC+4:30 (IRDT)

Takyeh (Persian: تكيه, also Romanized as Takiyeh) is a village in Razan Rural District, in the Central District of Razan County, Hamadan Province, Iran. At the 2006 census, its population was 348, in 83 families.
