= Dash Kasan, Shahin Dezh =

Dash Kasan داش كسن
- Village
- Location within Iran
- Coordinates: 36°42′37″N 46°28′47″E
- Country: Iran
- Province: West Azerbaijan
- County: Shahin Dezh
- Bakhsh: Central
- Rural District: Mahmudabad

Population (2006)
  - Total: 177
- Time zone: UTC+3:30 (IRST)
  - Summer (DST): UTC+4:30 (IRDT)

Dash Kasan (Persian: داش كسن, also Romanized as Dāsh Kasan) is a village in Mahmudabad Rural District, in the Central District of Shahin Dezh County, West Azerbaijan Province, Iran. At the 2006 census, its population was 177, in 38 families.
