= Takyeh, Kohgiluyeh and Boyer-Ahmad =

Takyeh تكيه
- Village
- Location within Iran
- Coordinates: 30°27′19″N 51°10′07″E
- Country: Iran
- Province: Kohgiluyeh and Boyer-Ahmad
- County: Basht
- Bakhsh: Basht
- Rural District: Babuyi

Population (2006)
  - Total: 65
- Time zone: UTC+3:30 (IRST)
  - Summer (DST): UTC+4:30 (IRDT)

Takyeh (Persian: تكيه, also Romanized as Tekyeh; also known as Teykeh) is a village in Babuyi Rural District, Basht District, Basht County, Kohgiluyeh and Boyer-Ahmad Province, Iran. At the 2006 census, its population was 65, in 15 families.
