= Tekeyeh-ye Hashmiz =

Tekeyeh-ye Hashmiz تكيه هشميز
- Village
- Location within Iran
- Coordinates: 35°12′33″N 46°47′41″E
- Country: Iran
- Province: Kurdistan
- County: Sanandaj
- Bakhsh: Central
- Rural District: Zhavarud-e Sharqi

Population (2006)
  - Total: 91
- Time zone: UTC+3:30 (IRST)
  - Summer (DST): UTC+4:30 (IRDT)

Tekeyeh-ye Hashmiz (Persian: تكيه هشميز, also Romanized as Tekeyeh-ye Hashmīz; also known as Tekeyeh and Tekyeh) is a village in Zhavarud-e Sharqi Rural District, in the Central District of Sanandaj County, Kurdistan Province, Iran. At the 2006 census, its population was 91, in 20 families. The village is populated by Kurds.
