= Dash Kasan, Meyaneh =

Dash Kasan داش كسن
- Village
- Location within Iran
- Coordinates: 37°26′15″N 47°37′47″E
- Country: Iran
- Province: East Azerbaijan
- County: Meyaneh
- Bakhsh: Central
- Rural District: Owch Tappeh-ye Sharqi

Population (2006)
  - Total: 88
- Time zone: UTC+3:30 (IRST)
  - Summer (DST): UTC+4:30 (IRDT)

Dash Kasan (Persian: داش كسن, also Romanized as Dāsh Kasan) is a village in Owch Tappeh-ye Sharqi Rural District, in the Central District of Meyaneh County, East Azerbaijan Province, Iran. At the 2006 census, its population was 88, in 16 families.
