= Jameh Shuran-e Sofla, Mahidasht =

Village in Kermanshah, Iran

Jameh Shuran-e Sofla جامه شوران سفلي
- Village
- Location within Iran
- Coordinates: 34°15′34″N 46°51′11″E
- Country: Iran
- Province: Kermanshah
- County: Kermanshah
- Bakhsh: Mahidasht
- Rural District: Mahidasht

Population (2006)
  - Total: 375
- Time zone: UTC+3:30 (IRST)
  - Summer (DST): UTC+4:30 (IRDT)

Jameh Shuran-e Sofla (Persian: جامه شوران سفلي, also Romanized as Jāmeh Shūrān-e Soflá; also known as Jāmeh Shūrān and Jāmeh Shūrān-e Pā’īn) is a village in Mahidasht Rural District, Mahidasht District, Kermanshah County, Kermanshah Province, Iran. At the 2006 census, its population was 375, in 97 families.
