= Laleh Khorramian =

Iranian-born American multidisciplinary artist

Laleh Khorramian (born 1974) is an Iranian-born American multidisciplinary visual artist. She works in printmaking, collage, video art and animation, and as a clothing designer. Khorramian is based in upstate New York, where she also runs her clothing company LALOON Studios.

== Biography ==
Laleh Khorramian was born in 1974 in Tehran, Iran. She was raised in Orlando, Florida. Khorramian studied at the Rhode Island School of Design; followed by study at the School of the Art Institute of Chicago where she earned a BFA degree in 1997. She earned her MFA degree in 2004, from Columbia University, School of Visual Arts.

Animation, digital media and found footage supplements use of traditional artistic media in her practice, like collage, mono-typing and drawing. In a vacillating process between them, Khorramian integrates fiction with spectacle and theatre constructions to explore the discarded and chance outcomes as a creative strategy.

Khorramian is a recipient of a Pollock-Krasner Foundation Grant and the Gottlieb Foundation Grant.

== Work ==
Art 21 Laleh Korrahamian’s Epic Animations (2013)

Art 21 Documents Laleh Korrahamian’s temporary art studio home in Campbell Hall, located in upstate New York and did her animations for the past 10 years. In the documentary she discusses in the inside of her studio Messi and surrounded by scraps of Mototypes, drawings, paintings or any artwork she has collected or made she used to make her animation.

In this 8 minutes documentary Korrahamian’s explains about using the Mototypes technique which is a unique version of printmaking to create a print that's typically painterly in effect this can be made any different way by applying paint to a flat sheet to metal, glass, or plastic. she would use Mototypes to create an underground art-style landscape throughout her animation where she'll place her little figures to travel and explore the animation.

She also tells a brief story about her past about her childhood and would inspire her to create these props and landscapes into her animations because she explained how visiting Disneyland a lot of times throughout growing up hasMeters think about Disney's mass entertainment was in her own words “Props” and creates a secretly harmful form of social control

Lastly, She mentions a short animation about one of her popular works Water Panics In The Sea (2011) She basically explains how the animation was made how it was formed together and why did she made this animation in the first place.

Water Panics in the Sea (2014)

Water Panics in the Sea is a 3-min short animated film that was originally created in 2011 but then a couple of years later in january 31, 2014 in Times Square New york displayed Korrahamian’s animation as part of times squares Midnight Moment where at the time of 11:57 pm-12:00 am they would displayed 92 artist animations/films/artwork throughout times square, In the time square Arts there’s a video about Korrahamian’s thoughts and explanation on why she choose to make this animation film that based on the themes of water, memories, and trauma that makes a vessel which is kinda a ship, the animation is basically a half human and half machine ship thats trapped in the water and it’s engaged in an epic unknown journey.

== Filmography ==
- Sophie and Goya, 2004, 10:54 min, Color w/ sound
- Chopperlady, 2005, 9:35 min, Color w/ sound
- I Without End, 2008, 6:45 min, Color w/ sound
- I Without End... Meanwhile, 2008, 4:20 min, Color w/ sound
- Liuto Golis, 2010, 5:36 min, Color w/ sound
- Water Panics in the Sea, 2011, 12:45 min, Color w/ sound
- Skin, 2011, 43:37 min, Color/silent
