= Dash Kasan, Charuymaq =

Dash Kasan داش كسن
- Village
- Location within Iran
- Coordinates: 37°00′03″N 46°55′41″E
- Country: Iran
- Province: East Azerbaijan
- County: Charuymaq
- Bakhsh: Central
- Rural District: Charuymaq-e Jonubegharbi

Population (2006)
  - Total: 37
- Time zone: UTC+3:30 (IRST)
  - Summer (DST): UTC+4:30 (IRDT)

Dash Kasan (Persian: داش كسن, also Romanized as Dāsh Kasan) is a village in Charuymaq-e Jonubegharbi Rural District, in the Central District of Charuymaq County, East Azerbaijan Province, Iran. At the 2006 census, its population was 37, in 7 families.
