= Quchaq, Saqqez =

Quchaq قوچاق
- Village
- Location within Iran
- Coordinates: 36°24′23″N 46°12′43″E
- Country: Iran
- Province: Kurdistan
- County: Saqqez
- Bakhsh: Central
- Rural District: Sara

Population (2006)
  - Total: 204
- Time zone: UTC+3:30 (IRST)
  - Summer (DST): UTC+4:30 (IRDT)

Quchaq (Persian: قوچاق, also Romanized as Qūchāq) is a village in Sara Rural District, in the Central District of Saqqez County, Kurdistan Province, Iran. At the 2006 census, its population was 204, in 42 families. The village is populated by Kurds.
