= Shadiabad, Kerman =

Shadiabad شادي اباد
- Village
- Location within Iran
- Coordinates: 30°22′32″N 55°28′54″E
- Country: Iran
- Province: Kerman
- County: Rafsanjan
- Bakhsh: Koshkuiyeh
- Rural District: Raviz

Population (2006)
  - Total: 8
- Time zone: UTC+3:30 (IRST)
  - Summer (DST): UTC+4:30 (IRDT)

Shadiabad (Persian: شادي اباد, also Romanized as Shādīābād) is a village in Raviz Rural District, Koshkuiyeh District, Rafsanjan County, Kerman Province, Iran. At the 2006 census, its population was 8, in 4 families.
