= Toghan, Mazandaran =

Toghan طغان
- Village
- Location within Iran
- Coordinates: 36°32′05″N 52°34′33″E
- Country: Iran
- Province: Mazandaran
- County: Babol
- Bakhsh: Lalehabad
- Rural District: Karipey

Population (2006)
  - Total: 556
- Time zone: UTC+3:30 (IRST)
  - Summer (DST): UTC+4:30 (IRDT)

Toghan (Persian: طغان, also Romanized as Ţoghān; also known as Ţowqān) is a village in Karipey Rural District, Lalehabad District, Babol County, Mazandaran Province, Iran. At the 2006 census, its population was 556, in 136 families.
