= Chahargah, Kermanshah =

Chahargah چهارگاه
- Village
- Location within Iran
- Coordinates: 34°55′51″N 47°33′55″E
- Country: Iran
- Province: Kermanshah
- County: Sonqor
- Bakhsh: Central
- Rural District: Gavrud

Population (2006)
  - Total: 196
- Time zone: UTC+3:30 (IRST)
  - Summer (DST): UTC+4:30 (IRDT)

Chahargah (Persian: چهارگاه, also Romanized as Chahārgāh) is a village in Gavrud Rural District, in the Central District of Sonqor County, Kermanshah Province, Iran. At the 2006 census, its population was 196, in 48 families.
