= Molla Sartip =

Molla Sartip ملاسرتيپ
- Village
- Location within Iran
- Coordinates: 30°15′51″N 51°05′44″E
- Country: Iran
- Province: Kohgiluyeh and Boyer-Ahmad
- County: Basht
- Bakhsh: Basht
- Rural District: Babuyi

Population (2006)
  - Total: 113
- Time zone: UTC+3:30 (IRST)
  - Summer (DST): UTC+4:30 (IRDT)

Molla Sartip (Persian: ملاسرتيپ, also Romanized as Mollā Sartīp; also known as Sartīpābād) is a village in Babuyi Rural District, Basht District, Basht County, Kohgiluyeh and Boyer-Ahmad Province, Iran. At the 2006 census, its population was 113, in 22 families.
