= Tekyah, Kermanshah =

Tekyah تكيه
- Village
- Location within Iran
- Coordinates: 34°32′41″N 47°00′56″E
- Country: Iran
- Province: Kermanshah
- County: Kermanshah
- Bakhsh: Central
- Rural District: Miyan Darband

Population (2006)
  - Total: 333
- Time zone: UTC+3:30 (IRST)
  - Summer (DST): UTC+4:30 (IRDT)

Tekyah (Persian: تكيه, also Romanized as Takeyeh and Takyeh) is a village in Miyan Darband Rural District, in the Central District of Kermanshah County, Kermanshah Province, Iran. At the 2006 census, its population was 333, in 75 families.
