= Laleh Seddigh =

Iranian racing driver (born 1977)

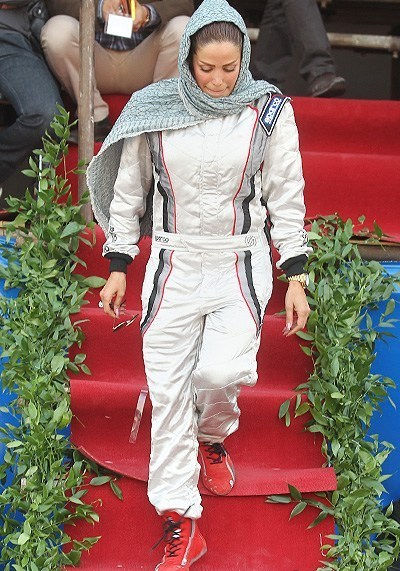
- Born: February 1977; Tehran
- Alma mater: University of Tehran
- Occupation: Racing driver, engineer
- Website: www.lalehseddigh.com

Laleh Seddigh (Persian: لاله صدیق; born 1977 in Tehran) is an Iranian racing driver. She has been described as 'one of the most celebrated sportswomen in Iran'.

== Biography ==
=== Early life ===
Seddigh started driving at the age of 13, taught by her father. She passed her driving test at 18.

=== Career ===
Seddigh had to get special permission from a local ayatollah in order to compete against men. Permission was given since driving is not deemed a contact sport, and on the condition that Seddigh would conform to dress-codes.

Seddigh has said that she will not leave Iran as she is 'most effective' in promoting women's rights in Iran. Seddigh has trained other female racing drivers.

=== Media ===
Seddigh's story is featured in a BBC TV documentary called Girl Racer, transmitted in 2008.

== See also ==
- List of famous Iranian women
- Iranian women's movement
