= Delbaran =

City in Kurdistan province, Iran

Delbaran Persian: دلبران
- City
- Location within Iran Location within Iran Kurdistan
- Coordinates: 35°14′33″N 47°59′13″E
- Country: Iran
- Province: Kurdistan
- County: Qorveh
- District: Delbaran

Population (2016)
  - Total: 6,713
- Time zone: UTC+3:30 (IRST)

Delbaran (Persian: دلبران) (Note: Also romanized as Delbarān; also known as Dīlbarān) is a city in, and the capital of, Delbaran District of Qorveh County, Kurdistan province, Iran. It also serves as the administrative center for Delbaran Rural District.

== Demographics ==
=== Language ===
Linguistic composition of the city:

Delbaran linguistic composition
| language | percent |
| Turkic | 97% |
| New Persian | 2% |
| Southern Kurdish | 1% |

=== Population ===
At the time of the 2006 National Census, the city's population was 6,104 in 1,395 households, when it was in the Central District. The following census in 2011 counted 7,076 people in 1,825 households. The 2016 census measured the population of the city as 6,713 people in 1,974 households, by which time the city and rural district had been separated from the district in the formation of Delbaran District.
