= Jameh Shuran-e Olya, Kermanshah =

Jameh Shuran-e Olya جامه شوران عليا
- Village
- Location within Iran
- Coordinates: 34°10′24″N 47°19′09″E
- Country: Iran
- Province: Kermanshah
- County: Kermanshah
- Bakhsh: Central
- Rural District: Qarah Su

Population (2006)
  - Total: 49
- Time zone: UTC+3:30 (IRST)
  - Summer (DST): UTC+4:30 (IRDT)

Jameh Shuran-e Olya (Persian: جامه شوران عليا, also Romanized as Jāmeh Shūrān-e ‘Olyā and Jameh Shūrān-e ‘Olyā) is a village in Qarah Su Rural District, in the Central District of Kermanshah County, Kermanshah Province, Iran. At the 2006 census, its population was 49, in 8 families.
