= Zangabad, East Azerbaijan =

Zangabad زنگ اباد
- Village
- Location within Iran
- Coordinates: 38°25′48″N 46°43′34″E
- Country: Iran
- Province: East Azerbaijan
- County: Varzaqan
- Bakhsh: Central
- Rural District: Ozomdel-e Jonubi

Population (2006)
  - Total: 421
- Time zone: UTC+3:30 (IRST)
  - Summer (DST): UTC+4:30 (IRDT)

Zangabad (Persian: زنگ اباد, also Romanized as Zangābād; also known as Zangīābād and Zengiabad) is a village in Ozomdel-e Jonubi Rural District, in the Central District of Varzaqan County, East Azerbaijan Province, Iran. At the 2006 census, its population was 421, in 73 families.
