= Nuray Lale =

Turkish-German writer and translator

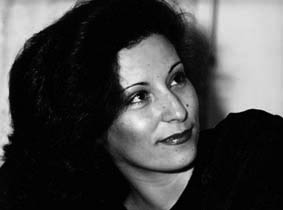
Nuray Lale

Nuray Lale (born 28 March 1962 in Antakya) is a Turkish-German writer and translator.

She arrived to Germany thanks to family reunification and studied health sciences at Bielefeld University, with a postgraduate degree in psycho-pedagogy at the University of Düsseldorf.

== Works ==
- Düş sarayim (2004)
- Şirin Aydın: Içimde ufuklar / Horizonte in mir (Deutsche Übertragung, 2004)
