= Bazmaghbyur =

Village in Aragatsotn, Armenia

Bazmaghbyur5 Բազմաղբյուր
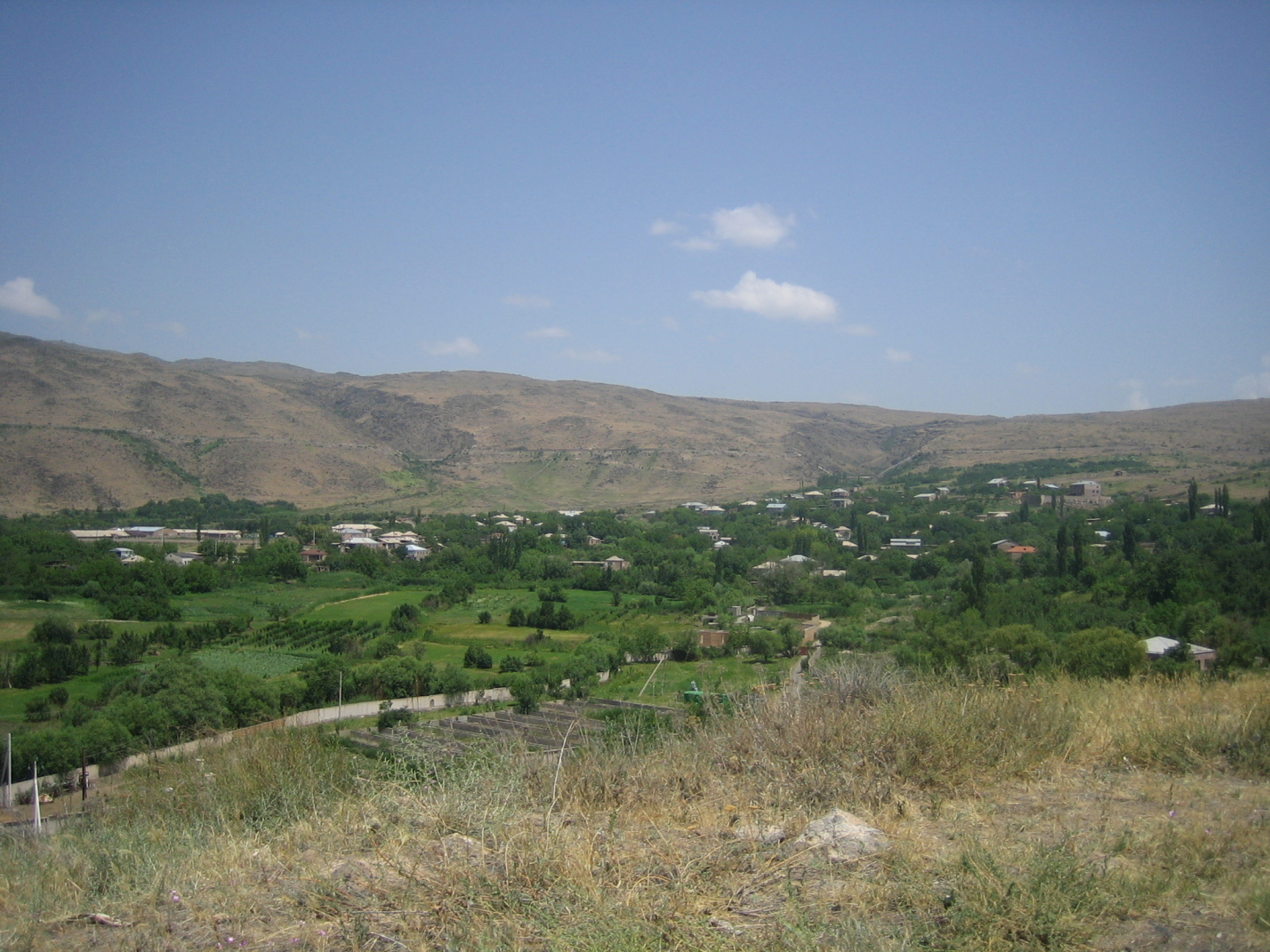
- View of Bazmaghbyur

- Location within Armenia Location within Aragatsotn
- Coordinates: 40°20′07″N 44°18′50″E
- Country: Armenia
- Province: Aragatsotn
- Municipality: Ashtarak
- Elevation: 1,150 m (3,770 ft)

Population (2011)
  - Total: 888
- Time zone: UTC+4
  - Summer (DST): UTC+5

Bazmaghbyur (Armenian: Բազմաղբյուր) is a village in the Ashtarak Municipality of the Aragatsotn Province of Armenia.
