= David Lale (Australian cellist) =

English-Australian cellist

David Lale (born 1962) is a cellist from England, who now lives in Australia. He is Principal Cellist of the Queensland Symphony Orchestra. He studied at the Royal Academy of Music in the UK, with Douglas Cummings, and was made an Honorary Associate in 1997. He has worked with the BBC Symphony Orchestra, London Symphony Orchestra, Royal Philharmonic Orchestra and London Virtuosi chamber orchestra. Before moving to Brisbane, he held the position of Assistant Principal Cello with the BBC Philharmonic Orchestra.

David is the uncle of the British cellist David Lale.

== Recordings ==
Eccles "Cello Sonata in G minor"
