= Takyeh, Khuzestan =

Takyeh تكيه
- Village
- Location within Iran
- Coordinates: 31°39′40″N 49°55′26″E
- Country: Iran
- Province: Khuzestan
- County: Bagh-e Malek
- Bakhsh: Central
- Rural District: Qaleh Tall

Population (2006)
  - Total: 1,264
- Time zone: UTC+3:30 (IRST)
  - Summer (DST): UTC+4:30 (IRDT)

Takyeh (Persian: تكيه, also Romanized as Takyeh and Takiyeh; also known as Takīya) is a village in Qaleh Tall Rural District, in the Central District of Bagh-e Malek County, Khuzestan Province, Iran. At the 2006 census, its population was 1,264, in 242 families.
