= Delbaran District =

District in Kurdistan province, Iran

Delbaran District Persian: بخش دلبران
- District
- Location within Iran Location within Iran Kurdistan
- Coordinates: 35°15′12″N 48°00′06″E
- Country: Iran
- Province: Kurdistan
- County: Qorveh
- Capital: Delbaran

Population (2016)
  - Total: 13,793
- Time zone: UTC+3:30 (IRST)

Delbaran District (Persian: بخش دلبران) is in Qorveh County, Kurdistan province, Iran. Its capital is the city of Delbaran.

== History ==
After the 2011 National Census, Delbaran Rural District and the city of Delbaran were separated from the Central District in the establishment of Delbaran District. After the 2016 census, the village of Malujeh was elevated to the status of a city.

== Demographics ==
=== Population ===
At the time of the 2016 census, the district's population was 13,793 inhabitants in 4,178 households.

=== Administrative divisions ===
Delbaran District Population
Administrative Divisions	2016
Delbaran RD	1,600
Malujeh RD	5,480
Delbaran (city)	6,713
Malujeh (city) (Note: Became a city after the 2016 census)	
Total	13,793
RD = Rural District
