= Qorveh =

City in Kurdistan province, Iran

Qorveh Persian: قروه Sorani Kurdish: قوروە Kurdish: Qurwe
- City
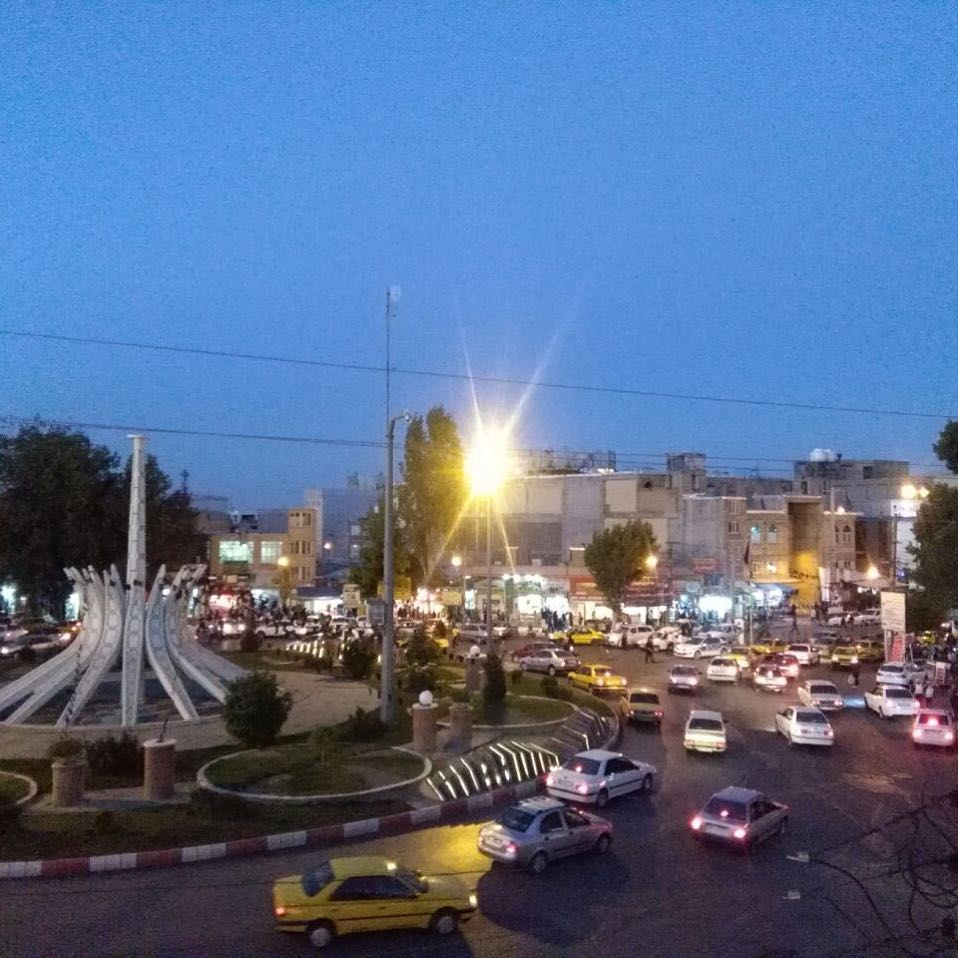
- Etihad-e Qorveh Square

- Location within Iran Location within Iran Kurdistan
- Coordinates: 35°10′04″N 47°48′03″E
- Country: Iran
- County: Qorveh
- Province: Kurdistan
- District: Central

Population (2016)
  - Total: 78,276
- Time zone: UTC+3:30 (IRST)

Qorveh (Persian: قروه) (Note: Sorani Kurdish: قوروە, Kurdish: Qurwe, romanized as Qurve, Qurveh, and Qurwe; also known as Ghorveh) is a city in the Central District of Qorveh County, Kurdistan province, Iran, serving as capital of both the county and the district.

== Demographics ==
=== Language and ethnicity ===
A majority of the population speak Kurdish with a Turkic minority.

Qorveh linguistic composition
language	percent
Central Kurdish	54%
Southern Kurdish	18%
Turkic	15%
New Persian	10%
Hawrami	3%

=== Population ===
At the time of the 2006 National Census, the city's population was 65,842 in 16,309 households. The following census in 2011 counted 71,232 people in 19,869 households. The 2016 census measured the population of the city as 78,276 people in 24,111 households.

== Geography ==
Qorveh is home to numerous peaks and elevations. Among them, the most noteworthy are Mount Parishaan, Mount Badr, Panjeh Ali, Ebrahim Attar, Yousef Siah, Shaban Kechal, Khersa Rih, and Seh Zardeh. The most significant of these are Mount Badr and Mount Parishaan.

=== Climate ===
Qorveh has a Mediterranean-influenced hot-summer humid continental climate (Dsa) according to the Köppen climate classification.

Climate data for Qorveh (1989-2010 normals), elevation: 1,906.0 m (6,253.3 ft)
Month	Jan	Feb	Mar	Apr	May	Jun	Jul	Aug	Sep	Oct	Nov	Dec	Year
Daily mean °C (°F)	−2.8 (27.0)	−0.6 (30.9)	4.9 (40.8)	10.6 (51.1)	15.2 (59.4)	20.9 (69.6)	24.8 (76.6)	24.6 (76.3)	19.8 (67.6)	13.9 (57.0)	6.5 (43.7)	1.3 (34.3)	11.6 (52.9)
Average precipitation mm (inches)	34.9 (1.37)	39.5 (1.56)	62.7 (2.47)	59.8 (2.35)	30.9 (1.22)	4.2 (0.17)	4.1 (0.16)	1.5 (0.06)	2.1 (0.08)	20.3 (0.80)	46.7 (1.84)	36.5 (1.44)	343.2 (13.52)
Source: Iran Meteorological Organization (temperatures), (precipitation)
