= David Lale (British cellist) =

British cellist

David Lale (born 1981) is a cellist from the United Kingdom. He is a member of the London Philharmonic Orchestra (sub-principal No. 4), Lale String Quartet and plays regularly in a number of orchestras in the UK including the BBC Symphony Orchestra and the Philharmonia Orchestra. David is the nephew of Australian cellist David Lale.

David studied under Anna Shuttleworth at the University of Leeds and Louise Hopkins at the Guildhall School of Music and Drama. He has performed as soloist with the Southbank Sinfonia and with other orchestras.

== Recordings ==
David Lloyd-Mostyn "tigh-nan-uiseagan"
