= Qaslan Rural District =

Rural district in Kurdistan province, Iran

Qaslan Rural District Persian: دهستان قصلان
- Rural District
- Location within Iran Location within Iran Kurdistan
- Coordinates: 35°18′35″N 47°49′15″E
- Country: Iran
- Province: Kurdistan
- County: Qorveh
- District: Serishabad
- Capital: Qaslan

Population (2016)
  - Total: 4,865
- Time zone: UTC+3:30 (IRST)

Qaslan Rural District (Persian: دهستان قصلان) is in Serishabad District (Note: Formerly Talvar District) of Qorveh County, Kurdistan province, Iran. Its capital is the village of Qaslan.

== Demographics ==
=== Population ===
At the time of the 2006 National Census, the rural district's population was 5,421 in 1,375 households. There were 5,151 inhabitants in 1,543 households at the following census of 2011. The 2016 census measured the population of the rural district as 4,865 in 1,492 households. The most populous of its 17 villages was Qaslan, with 1,212 people.
