= Lak Rural District =

Rural district in Kurdistan province, Iran

Lak Rural District Persian: دهستان لك
- Rural District
- Location within Iran Location within Iran Kurdistan
- Coordinates: 35°28′07″N 47°43′17″E
- Country: Iran
- Province: Kurdistan
- County: Qorveh
- District: Serishabad
- Capital: Gilaklu

Population (2016)
  - Total: 2,153
- Time zone: UTC+3:30 (IRST)

Lak Rural District (Persian: دهستان لك) is in Serishabad District (Note: Formerly Talvar District) of Qorveh County, Kurdistan province, Iran. Its capital is the village of Gilaklu.

== Demographics ==
=== Population ===
At the time of the 2006 National Census, the rural district's population was 3,961 in 852 households. There were 3,082 inhabitants in 864 households at the following census of 2011. The 2016 census measured the population of the rural district as 2,153 in 655 households. The most populous of its 23 villages was Gilaklu, with 350 people.
