= Panjeh Ali-ye Shomali Rural District =

Rural district in Kurdistan province, Iran

Panjeh Ali-ye Shomali Rural District Persian: دهستان پنجه علي شمالي
- Rural District
- Location within Iran Location within Iran Kurdistan
- Coordinates: 35°11′N 47°37′E
- Country: Iran
- Province: Kurdistan
- County: Qorveh
- District: Central
- Capital: Kani Ganji

Population (2016)
  - Total: 4,643
- Time zone: UTC+3:30 (IRST)

Panjeh Ali-ye Shomali Rural District (Persian: دهستان پنجه علي شمالي) (Note: Formerly Panjeh Ali Rural District (دهستان پنجه)) is in the Central District of Qorveh County, Kurdistan province, Iran. Its capital is the village of Kani Ganji.

== Demographics ==
=== Population ===
At the time of the 2006 National Census, the rural district's population was 4,954 in 1,133 households. There were 5,224 inhabitants in 1,387 households at the following census of 2011. The 2016 census measured the population of the rural district as 4,643 in 1,412 households. The most populous of its 16 villages was Shanureh, with 803 people.
