= Badr Rural District (Qorveh County) =

Rural district in Kurdistan province, Iran

Badr Rural District Persian: دهستان بدر
- Rural District
- Location within Iran Location within Iran Kurdistan
- Coordinates: 35°06′56″N 47°47′07″E
- Country: Iran
- Province: Kurdistan
- County: Qorveh
- District: Central
- Capital: Veyhaj

Population (2016)
  - Total: 6,032
- Time zone: UTC+3:30 (IRST)

Badr Rural District (Persian: دهستان بدر) is in the Central District of Qorveh County, Kurdistan province, Iran. Its capital is the village of Veyhaj. The previous capital of the rural district was the village of Qaleh.

== Demographics ==
=== Population ===
At the time of the 2006 National Census, the rural district's population was 7,931 in 1,872 households. There were 4,306 inhabitants in 1,152 households at the following census of 2011. The 2016 census measured the population of the rural district as 6,032 in 1,717 households. The most populous of its 14 villages was Divzand, with 1,745 people.
