= Chaharduli-ye Sharqi Rural District =

Rural district in Kurdistan province, Iran

Chaharduli-ye Sharqi Rural District Persian: دهستان چهاردولي شرقي
- Rural District
- Location within Iran Location within Iran Kurdistan
- Coordinates: 35°04′43″N 48°05′40″E
- Country: Iran
- Province: Kurdistan
- County: Qorveh
- District: Chaharduli
- Capital: Vey Nesar

Population (2016)
  - Total: 6,562
- Time zone: UTC+3:30 (IRST)

Chaharduli-ye Sharqi Rural District (Persian: دهستان چهاردولي شرقي) is in Chaharduli District of Qorveh County, Kurdistan province, Iran. Its capital is the village of Vey Nesar.

== Demographics ==
=== Population ===
At the time of the 2006 National Census, the rural district's population was 8,193 in 1,987 households. There were 7,780 inhabitants in 2,131 households at the following census of 2011. The 2016 census measured the population of the rural district as 6,562 in 1,998 households. The most populous of its 14 villages was Vey Nesar, with 2,350 people.
