= Panjeh Ali-ye Jonubi Rural District =

Rural district in Kurdistan province, Iran

Panjeh Ali-ye Jonubi Rural District Persian: دهستان پنجه علي جنوبي
- Rural District
- Location within Iran Location within Iran Kurdistan
- Coordinates: 35°08′37″N 47°32′34″E
- Country: Iran
- Province: Kurdistan
- County: Qorveh
- District: Central
- Capital: Qamlu

Population (2016)
  - Total: 3,336
- Time zone: UTC+3:30 (IRST)

Panjeh Ali-ye Jonubi Rural District (Persian: دهستان پنجه علي جنوبي) is in the Central District of Qorveh County, Kurdistan province, Iran. Its capital is the village of Qamlu.

== Demographics ==
=== Population ===
At the time of the 2006 National Census, the rural district's population was 6,762 in 1,510 households. There were 3,484 inhabitants in 963 households at the following census of 2011. The 2016 census measured the population of the rural district as 3,336 in 1,022 households. The most populous of its 11 villages was Nabiabad, with 873 people.
