= Yalghuz Aghaj Rural District =

Rural district in Kurdistan province, Iran

Yalghuz Aghaj Rural District Persian: دهستان يالغوزآغاج
- Rural District
- Location within Iran Location within Iran Kurdistan
- Coordinates: 35°18′28″N 47°37′16″E
- Country: Iran
- Province: Kurdistan
- County: Qorveh
- District: Serishabad
- Capital: Yalghuz Aghaj

Population (2016)
  - Total: 3,503
- Time zone: UTC+3:30 (IRST)

Yalghuz Aghaj Rural District (Persian: دهستان يالغوزآغاج) is in Serishabad District (Note: Formerly Talvar District) of Qorveh County, Kurdistan province, Iran. Its capital is the village of Yalghuz Aghaj.

== Demographics ==
=== Population ===
At the time of the 2006 National Census, the rural district's population was 4,318 in 1,032 households. There were 3,809 inhabitants in 1,079 households at the following census of 2011. The 2016 census measured the population of the rural district as 3,503 in 1,090 households. The most populous of its 15 villages was Yalghuz Aghaj, with 1,113 people.
