= Chaharduli-ye Gharbi Rural District =

Rural district in Kurdistan province, Iran

Chaharduli-ye Gharbi Rural District Persian: دهستان چهاردولي غربي
- Rural District
- Location within Iran Location within Iran Kurdistan
- Coordinates: 35°02′34″N 47°54′46″E
- Country: Iran
- Province: Kurdistan
- County: Qorveh
- District: Chaharduli
- Capital: Dezej

Population (2016)
  - Total: 7,614
- Time zone: UTC+3:30 (IRST)

Chaharduli-ye Gharbi Rural District (Persian: دهستان چهاردولي غربي) (Note: Formerly Chaharduli Rural District (دهستان چهاردولي)) is in Chaharduli District of Qorveh County, Kurdistan province, Iran. It is administered from the city of Dezej.

== Demographics ==
=== Population ===
At the time of the 2006 National Census, the rural district's population was 8,164 in 1,826 households. There were 8,048 inhabitants in 2,255 households at the following census of 2011. The 2016 census measured the population of the rural district as 7,614 in 2,252 households. The most populous of its 30 villages was Meyham-e Sofla, with 1,422 people.
