= Delbaran Rural District =

Rural district in Kurdistan province, Iran

Delbaran Rural District Persian: دهستان دلبران
- Rural District
- Location within Iran Location within Iran Kurdistan
- Coordinates: 35°13′00″N 48°00′06″E
- Country: Iran
- Province: Kurdistan
- County: Qorveh
- District: Delbaran
- Capital: Delbaran

Population (2016)
  - Total: 1,600
- Time zone: UTC+3:30 (IRST)

Delbaran Rural District (Persian: دهستان دلبران) is in Delbaran District of Qorveh County, Kurdistan province, Iran. It is administered from the city of Delbaran.

== Demographics ==
=== Population ===
At the time of the 2006 National Census, the rural district's population (as a part of the Central District) was 7,965 in 1,842 households. There were 8,283 inhabitants in 2,353 households at the following census of 2011. The 2016 census measured the population of the rural district as 1,600 in 522 households, by which time the rural district had been separated from the district in the formation of Delbaran District. The most populous of its five villages was Baharlu, with 812 people.
