= Chaharduli District =

District in Kurdistan province, Iran

Chaharduli District Persian: بخش چهاردولی
- District
- Location within Iran Location within Iran Kurdistan
- Coordinates: 35°03′39″N 47°59′08″E
- Country: Iran
- Province: Kurdistan
- County: Qorveh
- Capital: Dezej

Population (2016)
  - Total: 16,395
- Time zone: UTC+3:30 (IRST)

Chaharduli District (Persian: بخش چهاردولی) is in Qorveh County, Kurdistan province, Iran. Its capital is the city of Dezej.

== Demographics ==
=== Population ===
At the time of the 2006 National Census, the district's population was 18,649 in 4,372 households. The following census in 2011 counted 18,118 people in 5,019 households. The 2016 census measured the population of the district as 16,395 inhabitants in 4,916 households.

=== Administrative divisions ===
Chaharduli District Population
Administrative Divisions	2006	2011	2016
Chaharduli-ye Gharbi RD (Note: Formerly Chaharduli Rural District)	8,164	8,048	7,614
Chaharduli-ye Sharqi RD	8,193	7,780	6,562
Dezej (city)	2,292	2,290	2,219
Total	18,649	18,118	16,395
RD = Rural District
