= Serishabad District =

District in Kurdistan province, Iran

Serishabad District Persian: بخش سریش‌آباد
- District
- Location within Iran Location within Iran Kurdistan
- Coordinates: 35°22′40″N 47°45′04″E
- Country: Iran
- Province: Kurdistan
- County: Qorveh
- Capital: Serishabad

Population (2016)
  - Total: 17,717
- Time zone: UTC+3:30 (IRST)

Serishabad District (Persian: بخش سریش‌آباد) (Note: Formerly Talvar District (بخش تلوار)) is in Qorveh County, Kurdistan province, Iran. Its capital is the city of Serishabad.

== Demographics ==
=== Population ===
At the time of the 2006 National Census, the district's population was 20,263 in 5,001 households. The following census in 2011 counted 19,236 people in 5,633 households. The 2016 census measured the population of the district as 17,717 inhabitants in 5,549 households.

=== Administrative divisions ===
Serishabad District Population
Administrative Divisions	2006	2011	2016
Lak RD	3,961	3,082	2,153
Qaslan RD	5,421	5,151	4,865
Yalghuz Aghaj RD	4,318	3,809	3,503
Serishabad (city)	6,563	7,194	7,196
Total	20,263	19,236	17,717
RD = Rural District
