= Central District (Qorveh County) =

District in Kurdistan province, Iran

Central District (Qorveh County) Persian: بخش مرکزی شهرستان قروه
- District
- Location within Iran Location within Iran Kurdistan
- Coordinates: 35°08′55″N 47°39′58″E
- Country: Iran
- Province: Kurdistan
- County: Qorveh
- Capital: Qorveh

Population (2016)
  - Total: 92,287
- Time zone: UTC+3:30 (IRST)

The Central District of Qorveh County (Persian: بخش مرکزی شهرستان قروه) is in Kurdistan province, Iran. Its capital is the city of Qorveh.

== History ==
After the 2011 National Census, Delbaran Rural District and the city of Delbaran were separated from the district in the formation of Delbaran District.

== Demographics ==
=== Population ===
At the time of the 2006 census, the district's population was 99,558 in 24,061 households. The following census in 2011 counted 99,607 people in 27,549 households. The 2016 census measured the population of the district as 92,287 inhabitants in 28,262 households.

=== Administrative divisions ===
Central District (Qorveh County) Population
Administrative Divisions	2006	2011	2016
Badr RD	7,931	4,308	6,032
Delbaran RD (Note: Transferred to Delbaran District)	7,965	8,283	
Panjeh Ali-ye Jonubi RD	6,762	3,484	3,336
Panjeh Ali-ye Shomali RD (Note: Formerly Panjeh Ali Rural District)	4,954	5,224	4,643
Delbaran (city)	6,104	7,076	
Qorveh (city)	65,842	71,232	78,276
Total	99,558	99,607	92,287
RD = Rural District
