= Qorveh County =

County in Kurdistan province, Iran

Qorveh County Persian: شهرستان قروه
- County
- Location of Qorveh County in Kurdistan province

- Location of Kurdistan province in Iran
- Coordinates: 35°16′N 47°48′E
- Country: Iran
- Province: Kurdistan
- Capital: Qorveh
- Districts: Central, Chaharduli, Delbaran, Serishabad

Population (2016)
  - Total: 140,192
- Time zone: UTC+3:30 (IRST)

Qorveh County (Persian: شهرستان قروه) is in Kurdistan province, Iran. Its capital is the city of Qorveh.

== History ==
After the 2006 National Census, Yeylaq District was separated from the county in the establishment of Dehgolan County. After the 2011 census, Delbaran Rural District and the city of Delbaran were separated from the Central District in the formation of Delbaran District, including the new Malujeh Rural District. After the 2016 census, the village of Malujeh was elevated to the status of a city.

== Demographics ==
=== Population ===
At the time of the 2006 census, the county's population was 196,972 in 47,214 households. The following census in 2011 counted 136,961 people in 38,161 households. The 2016 census measured the population of the county as 140,192 in 42,905 households.

=== Administrative divisions ===
Qorveh County's population history and administrative structure over three consecutive censuses are shown in the following table.

Qorveh County Population
Administrative Divisions	2006	2011	2016
Central District	99,558	99,607	92,287
Badr RD	7,931	4,308	6,032
Delbaran RD	7,965	8,283	
Panjeh Ali-ye Jonubi RD	6,762	3,484	3,336
Panjeh Ali-ye Shomali RD (Note: Formerly Panjeh Ali Rural District)	4,954	5,224	4,643
Delbaran (city)	6,104	7,076	
Qorveh (city)	65,842	71,232	78,276
Chaharduli District	18,649	18,118	16,395
Chaharduli-ye Gharbi RD (Note: Formerly Chaharduli Rural District)	8,164	8,048	7,614
Chaharduli-ye Sharqi RD	8,193	7,780	6,562
Dezej (city)	2,292	2,290	2,219
Delbaran District			13,793
Delbaran RD			1,600
Malujeh RD			5,480
Delbaran (city)			6,713
Malujeh (city) (Note: Became a city after the 2016 census)			
Serishabad District (Note: Formerly Talvar District)	20,263	19,236	17,717
Lak RD	3,961	3,082	2,153
Qaslan RD	5,421	5,151	4,865
Yalghuz Aghaj RD	4,318	3,809	3,503
Serishabad (city)	6,563	7,194	7,196
Yeylaq District (Note: Transferred to Dehgolan County)	58,502		
Howmeh-ye Dehgolan RD	7,046		
Quri Chay RD	8,206		
Yeylaq-e Jonubi RD	16,855		
Yeylaq-e Shomali RD	6,169		
Dehgolan (city)	20,226		
Total	196,972	136,961	140,192
RD = Rural District

== See also ==
Media related to Qorveh County at Wikimedia Commons
