= Mount Chlchama =

Highest mountain in Rojhalat

ChlChama چلچەمە
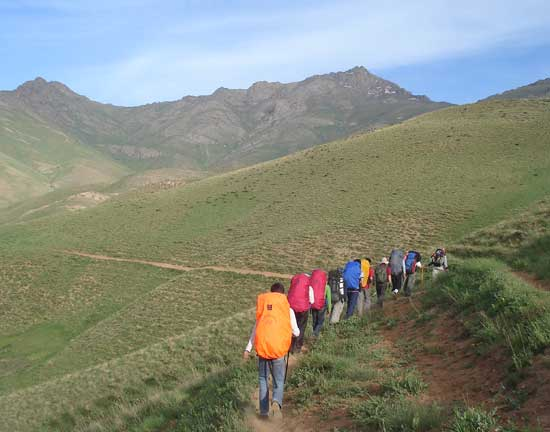
- Climbing Mount ChlChamah 2012

Highest point
- Elevation: 3,173 m (10,410 ft)
- Prominence: 1,139 m (3,737 ft)
- Listing: Ribu
- Coordinates: 35°49′09″N 46°32′11″E

Geography
- Location within Iran
- Location: Saqqez, Kurdistan, Iran
- Parent range: Zagros - Kurdistan

Climbing
- Easiest route: Hike

Mount ChlChama (Persian: چهل‌چشمه, Kurdish: چلچەمە) is a part of the Zagros mountains, which are located in Iran, between the cities of Saqqez, Divandarreh and Marivan in Kurdistan province. The highest peak of Chlchama, also known as Chlchama, is 3,173 metres above sea level, near the villages of Isakawa and Kanemat, 56 kilometres southwest of Saqqez.

== Famous peaks ==
The Chehel Cheshmeh mountain includes about twenty other peaks, including Shahneshin Mountain, Dalash Mountain, Dobra Mountain, Sultan akhzartoo Mountain, Bainchub Mountain, Afrasiab Mountain, Kani Miran Mountain, Mazgat and Mirza Mountain (Mosque and Mirza), South and The whole mountain of Koj are different heights. This region is one of the coldest and snowiest regions of Kurdistan and is covered with snow all year round. It is also one of the largest glaciers in Iran.

== Surrounding villages ==
From the villages around Chehel Cheshmeh, we can mention Eshqabad, Kanemat, Best, Darreh Gavan, Soleh, Nargesleh and Darreh Hovan. There are three common routes to climb this mountain, Ishaqabad, Bast, and Darreh Hovan. A shelter has been built near the village of Bast for the use of mountaineers.

== Ecosystem ==
=== Flora ===
The large mountain contains hundreds of medicinal plant species, including: Rheum (plant), Viola (plant), Convolvulus, Primula vulgaris, and so on. Mount Chlchama is one of the most bio-diverse areas in Iran. However, its biodiversity has been threatened due to overuse and uprooting of plants in recent years.

=== Wild life ===
At the foot of the mountain, a variety of animals such as snakes, wolves, bears, antelopes, foxes, rabbits, lizards and various species of birds like partridge and eagle live.

== Rivers ==
Important rivers that originate in this area include the following:

- Caspian Sea basin: Ghezel Ozan which goins Sefidrood that flows into the Caspian Sea.
- Persian Gulf Basin: Ghshlagh River which is the main water supplier of Vahdat Dam in 20 km south of Sanandaj joining Gaveh River; They create the Sirvan River, the water of which eventually flows into the Arvand River and the Persian Gulf.
- Urmia Lake basin: Khorkhoreh River and Zarrineh River are two main rivers which flows into Saqqez Lagzi Dam than Urmia Lake.

== Springs and Yaylaks ==
There are many springs in all the slopes of this region, the most famous of them is called ‘’Kanichash’’, which is located on its southeastern side. Among the Yaylaks of Chehelcheshmeh, we can mention Garmeh yaylak in the northwest of Marivan, Qolang Ahmad Khedr yaylak in the northeastern region of Divandereh, Mikael Kavireh yaylak, Hawar or Kani Chavoresh yaylak, Jamin yaylak, Kani Zulaikha yaylak and finally Mustafa Khan yaylak. In this complex, due to its steep paths and avalanche valleys, it is very dangerous in winter, and in order to climb it, one must use guides and climbers familiar with the route of the region.

== See also ==
- List of mountains in Iran
- List of peaks by prominence
