= Eshqabad =

Eshqabad (Persian: عشق اباد) may refer to:

== Hamadan Province ==
- Eshqabad, Hamadan, a village

== Isfahan Province ==
- Eshqabad, Isfahan, a village in Isfahan County

== Kerman Province ==
- Eshqabad, Kerman, a village

== Kurdistan Province ==
- Eshqabad, Kurdistan, a village

== Mazandaran Province ==
- Eshqabad, Mazandaran, a village

== North Khorasan Province ==
- Eshqabad, North Khorasan, a village

== Razavi Khorasan Province ==
- Eshqabad, Razavi Khorasan, a city in Nishapur County
- Eshqabad, Chenaran, a village in Chenaran County
- Eshqabad, Fariman, a village in Fariman County
- Eshqabad, Mashhad, a village in Mashhad County
- Eshqabad, Mazul, a village in Nishapur County
- Eshqabad (Eyshabad), Mazul, a village in Nishapur County
- Eshqabad, Sarvelayat, a village in Nishapur County
- Eshqabad-e Kohneh, a village in Nishapur County
- Eshqabad Rural District, in Razavi Khorasan Province

== South Khorasan Province ==
- Eshqabad, South Khorasan, a city in Tabas County
- Eshqabad, Birjand, a village in Birjand County
- Eshqabad, Boshruyeh, a village in Boshruyeh County
- Eshqabad, Qaen, a village in Qaen County

== Tehran Province ==
- Eshqabad, Tehran, a village

== West Azerbaijan Province ==
- Eshqabad, West Azerbaijan, a village

== Yazd Province ==
- Eshqabad, Taft, a village in Taft County

== See also ==
- Eshaqabad (disambiguation)
