= Kani Sefid =

Kani Sefid or Kani Safid (Persian: كاني سفيد) may refer to various places in Iran:

- Kani Sefid, Divandarreh, Kurdistan Province
- Kani Sefid, Karaftu, Divandarreh County, Kurdistan Province
- Kani Sefid, Marivan, Kurdistan Province
- Kani Sefid, Saqqez, Kurdistan Province
- Kani Sefid, Mahabad, West Azerbaijan Province
- Kani Sefid, Salmas, West Azerbaijan Province
- Kani Sefid, Urmia, West Azerbaijan Province
