= Eshaqabad =

Eshaqabad (Persian: اسحاق آباد or اسحق آباد), also rendered as Eshagh Abad, may refer to:

== Esḩaqābād (اسحق آباد) ==
- Eshaqabad, Isfahan
- Eshaqabad, Shahr-e Babak, Kerman Province
- Eshaqabad, Sirjan, Kerman Province
- Eshaqabad, Nishapur, Razavi Khorasan Province
- Eshaqabad, Nik Shahr, Sistan and Baluchestan Province
- Eshaqabad Rural District, in Razavi Khorasan Province

== Esḩāqābād (اسحاق آباد) ==
- Eshaqabad, Kerman
- Eshaqabad, Kurdistan
- Eshaqabad, Lorestan
- Eshaqabad, Kashmar, Razavi Khorasan Province
- Eshaqabad, Sarbaz, Sistan and Baluchestan Province

== See also ==
- Eshqabad (disambiguation)
