= Nesar (disambiguation) =

Nesar (Persian: نثار) may refer to:

== Places ==
- Nesar, village in Iran
- Nesar, Ardabil, village in Iran
- Nesar, Kermanshah, village in Iran
- Nesar-e-Bala, village in Iran
- Nesar-e Bozorg, village in Iran
- Nesar-e Eskandari, village in Iran
- Nesar-e Kuchek, village in Iran
- Nesar-e Meleh Maran, village in Iran
- Nesar-e Pain, village in Iran
- Nesar-e Chalab Zard, village in Iran

== See also ==
- Nesareh (disambiguation)
