= Banavchan =

Banavchan بناوچان
- Village
- Location within Iran
- Coordinates: 35°53′21″N 46°39′05″E
- Country: Iran
- Province: Kurdistan
- County: Divandarreh
- Bakhsh: Central
- Rural District: Chehel Cheshmeh

Population (2006)
  - Total: 198
- Time zone: UTC+3:30 (IRST)
  - Summer (DST): UTC+4:30 (IRDT)

Banavchan (Persian: بناوچان, also Romanized as Banāvchān; also known as Banāvojān and Benāvojān) is a village in Chehel Cheshmeh Rural District, in the Central District of Divandarreh County, Kurdistan Province, Iran. At the 2006 census, its population was 198, in 40 families. The village is populated by Kurds.
