= Qaratureh =

Village in Kurdistan, Iran

Qaratureh قراتوره
- Village
- Location within Iran
- Coordinates: 36°06′52″N 47°19′16″E
- Country: Iran
- Province: Kurdistan
- County: Divandarreh
- Bakhsh: Central
- Rural District: Qaratureh

Population (2006)
  - Total: 250
- Time zone: UTC+3:30 (IRST)
  - Summer (DST): UTC+4:30 (IRDT)

Qaratureh (Persian: قراتوره, also Romanized as Qarātūreh; also known as Qarah Ţūreh) is a village in Qaratureh Rural District, in the Central District of Divandarreh County, Kurdistan Province, Iran. At the 2006 census, its population was 250, in 55 families. The village is populated by Kurds.
