= Shekar Bolagh =

Shekar Bolagh شكربلاغ
- Village
- Location within Iran
- Coordinates: 36°01′18″N 47°23′44″E
- Country: Iran
- Province: Kurdistan
- County: Divandarreh
- Bakhsh: Central
- Rural District: Qaratureh

Population (2006)
  - Total: 78
- Time zone: UTC+3:30 (IRST)
  - Summer (DST): UTC+4:30 (IRDT)

Shekar Bolagh (Persian: شكربلاغ, also Romanized as Shekar Bolāgh) is a village in Qaratureh Rural District, in the Central District of Divandarreh County, Kurdistan Province, Iran. At the 2006 census, its population was 78, in 17 families. The village is populated by Azerbaijanis.
