= Qowsheh =

Qowsheh or Qusheh (Persian: قُوشِه), also rendered as Qosheh may refer to:

- Qowsheh-ye Olya, Ardabil Province
- Qowsheh-ye Sofla, Ardabil Province
- Qowsheh Qui, Qazvin Province
- Qusheh, Semnan Province
