= Nesareh =

Nesareh or Nosareh or Nasreh, or Nossareh (Persian: نثاره or نساره), also rendered as Natharah may refer to:

- Nesareh-ye Bozorg (نثاره), Khuzestan Province
- Nesareh-ye Kuchek (نثاره), Khuzestan Province
- Nesareh-ye Olya (نساره), Kurdistan Province
- Nesareh-ye Sofla (نساره), Kurdistan Province
