= Darreh Asb =

Darreh Asb دره اسب
- Village
- Location within Iran
- Coordinates: 36°00′48″N 47°11′51″E
- Country: Iran
- Province: Kurdistan
- County: Divandarreh
- Bakhsh: Central
- Rural District: Qaratureh

Population (2006)
  - Total: 542
- Time zone: UTC+3:30 (IRST)
  - Summer (DST): UTC+4:30 (IRDT)

Darreh Asb (Persian: دره اسب; also known as Darasb) is a village in Qaratureh Rural District, in the Central District of Divandarreh County, Kurdistan Province, Iran. At the 2006 census, its population was 542, in 104 families. The village is populated by Kurds.
