= Kaqoli =

Kaqoli كاقلي
- Village
- Location within Iran
- Coordinates: 35°54′58″N 46°58′24″E
- Country: Iran
- Province: Kurdistan
- County: Divandarreh
- Bakhsh: Central
- Rural District: Howmeh

Population (2006)
  - Total: 73
- Time zone: UTC+3:30 (IRST)
  - Summer (DST): UTC+4:30 (IRDT)

Kaqoli (Persian: كاقلي, also Romanized as Kāqolī) is a village in Howmeh Rural District, in the Central District of Divandarreh County, Kurdistan Province, Iran. At the 2006 census, its population was 73, in 19 families. The village is populated by Kurds.
