= Gol Qabagh =

Gol Qabagh گل قباغ
- Village
- Location within Iran
- Coordinates: 35°49′04″N 47°08′43″E
- Country: Iran
- Province: Kurdistan
- County: Divandarreh
- Bakhsh: Central
- Rural District: Howmeh

Population (2006)
  - Total: 95
- Time zone: UTC+3:30 (IRST)
  - Summer (DST): UTC+4:30 (IRDT)

Gol Qabagh (Persian: گل قباغ, also Romanized as Gol Qabāgh, Gol Qobāgh, and Gol-e Qabāgh; also known as Gol-e Khāvak and Gul-i-Khāwak) is a village in Howmeh Rural District, in the Central District of Divandarreh County, Kurdistan Province, Iran. At the 2006 census, its population was 95, in 23 families. The village is populated by Kurds.
