= Dalan =

Dalan may refer to:

Iran

- Bedrettin Dalan (b. 1941), mayor of Istanbul
- Dalan, Khuzestan, a village in Khuzestan Province, Iran
- Dalan, Kurdistan, a village in Kurdistan Province, Iran
- Dalan-e Gowhargan, a village in Kohgiluyeh and Boyer-Ahmad Province, Iran

China

- Dalan, Luxi (达岚镇), a town of Luxi County, Hunan, China.

== Others ==
- Dalaan, arcaded house with one open side overlooking a courtyard in Indian architecture
- Dalan Musson, American screenwriter
- Dalan (play), a Marathi play, featuring Amey Wagh and produced by the Natak Company
