= Qeshlaq Sorkheh =

Qeshlaq Sorkheh قشلاق سرخه
- Village
- Location within Iran
- Coordinates: 35°51′34″N 47°10′37″E
- Country: Iran
- Province: Kurdistan
- County: Divandarreh
- Bakhsh: Central
- Rural District: Howmeh

Population (2006)
  - Total: 126
- Time zone: UTC+3:30 (IRST)
  - Summer (DST): UTC+4:30 (IRDT)

Qeshlaq Sorkheh (Persian: قشلاق سرخه, also Romanized as Qeshlāq Sorkheh; also known as Qeshlāq Sūrkeh and Susurgha) is a village in Howmeh Rural District, in the Central District of Divandarreh County, Kurdistan Province, Iran. At the 2006 census, its population was 126, in 26 families. The village is populated by Kurds.
