= Ottoman =

Ottoman may refer to:

- Ottoman Empire 1299–1922
  - Ottoman dynasty, ruling family of the Ottoman Empire
    - Osmanoğlu family, modern members of the family
- Ottoman Caliphate 1517–1924
- Ottoman Turks, a Turkic ethnic group
- Ottoman architecture
- Ottoman bed, a type of storage bed
- Ottoman (furniture), padded stool or footstool
- Ottoman (textile), fabric with a pronounced ribbed or corded effect, often made of silk or a mixture

== See also ==
- Ottoman Turkish (disambiguation)
- Osman (disambiguation)
- Usman (disambiguation)
- Uthman (name), the male Arabic given name from which the name and word Ottoman is derived from
- Otto Mann, a character in The Simpsons
