= Qaleh-ye Reyhaneh =

Qaleh-ye Reyhaneh قلعه ريحانه
- Village
- Location within Iran
- Coordinates: 35°54′11″N 46°56′22″E
- Country: Iran
- Province: Kurdistan
- County: Divandarreh
- Bakhsh: Central
- Rural District: Howmeh

Population (2006)
  - Total: 168
- Time zone: UTC+3:30 (IRST)
  - Summer (DST): UTC+4:30 (IRDT)

Qaleh-ye Reyhaneh (Persian: قلعه ريحانه, also Romanized as Qal‘eh-ye Reyḩāneh and Qal‘eh-ye Reyhāneh) is a village in Howmeh Rural District, in the Central District of Divandarreh County, Kurdistan Province, Iran. At the 2006 census, its population was 168, in 38 families. The village is populated by Kurds.
