= Ab Bareh =

Ab Bareh آب باره
- Village
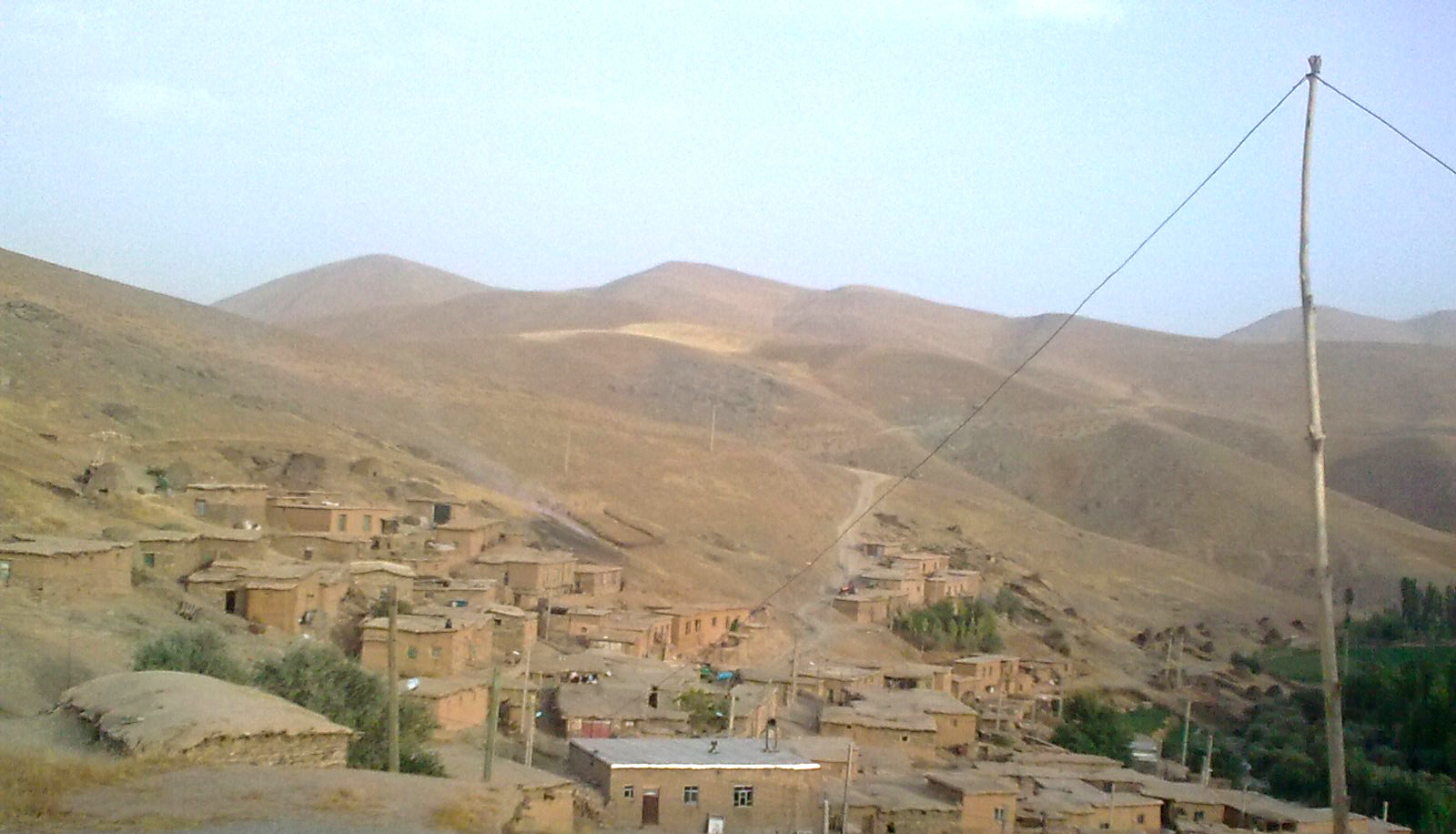

- Location within Iran
- Coordinates: 35°55′21″N 46°38′39″E
- Country: Iran
- Province: Kurdistan
- County: Divandarreh
- Bakhsh: Central
- Rural District: Chehel Cheshmeh

Population (2006)
  - Total: 220
- Time zone: UTC+3:30 (IRST)
  - Summer (DST): UTC+4:30 (IRDT)

Ab Bareh (Persian: آب باره, also Romanized as Āb Bāreh) is a village in Chehel Cheshmeh Rural District, in the Central District of Divandarreh County, Kurdistan province, Iran. According to the 2006 census, its population was 220 in 43 families. The village is populated by Kurds.
