= Darreh Vazan =

Darreh Vazan دره وزان
- Village
- Location within Iran
- Coordinates: 35°51′46″N 46°43′44″E
- Country: Iran
- Province: Kurdistan
- County: Divandarreh
- Bakhsh: Central
- Rural District: Chehel Cheshmeh

Population (2006)
  - Total: 317
- Time zone: UTC+3:30 (IRST)
  - Summer (DST): UTC+4:30 (IRDT)

Darreh Vazan (Persian: دره وزان, also Romanized as Darreh Vazān) is a village in Chehel Cheshmeh Rural District, in the Central District of Divandarreh County, Kurdistan Province, Iran. At the 2006 census, its population was 317, in 61 families. The village is populated by Kurds.
