= Keh Kusan =

Keh Kusan كه كوسان
- Village
- Location within Iran
- Coordinates: 35°55′47″N 46°34′16″E
- Country: Iran
- Province: Kurdistan
- County: Divandarreh
- Bakhsh: Central
- Rural District: Chehel Cheshmeh

Population (2006)
  - Total: 167
- Time zone: UTC+3:30 (IRST)
  - Summer (DST): UTC+4:30 (IRDT)

Keh Kusan (Persian: كه كوسان, also Romanized as Keh Kūsān; also known as Kageh Vasan, Kākeh Owsān, Kakowsān, Kalkūmān, Kekūsān, and Takavassan) is a village in Chehel Cheshmeh Rural District, in the Central District of Divandarreh County, Kurdistan Province, Iran. At the 2006 census, its population was 167, in 29 families. The village is populated by Kurds.
