= Qarahchi =

Qarahchi or Qarehchi (Persian: قره چي) may refer to:

- Qarahchi-ye Olya, Ardabil Province
- Qarahchi-ye Sofla, Ardabil Province
- Qarahchi-ye Ahmadabad, East Azerbaijan Province
- Qarahchi Qeran, Kurdistan Province
