= Qeshlaq-e Sefid =

Village in Kurdistan, Iran

Qeshlaq-e Sefid قشلاق سفيد
- Village
- Location within Iran
- Coordinates: 36°00′09″N 47°21′13″E
- Country: Iran
- Province: Kurdistan
- County: Divandarreh
- Bakhsh: Central
- Rural District: Qaratureh

Population (2006)
  - Total: 147
- Time zone: UTC+3:30 (IRST)
  - Summer (DST): UTC+4:30 (IRDT)

Qeshlaq-e Sefid (Persian: قشلاق سفيد, also Romanized as Qeshlāq-e Sefīd; also known as Qeshlāq Sefīd-e Seyyed Salām, Qishlāq Sefīd, and Seyyed Salām) is a village in Qaratureh Rural District, in the Central District of Divandarreh County, Kurdistan Province, Iran. At the 2006 census, its population was 147, in 36 families. The village is populated by Azerbaijanis.
