= Khaleh Bazeh =

Khaleh Bazeh خاله بازه
- Village
- Location within Iran
- Coordinates: 35°57′28″N 46°38′57″E
- Country: Iran
- Province: Kurdistan
- County: Divandarreh
- Bakhsh: Central
- Rural District: Chehel Cheshmeh

Population (2006)
  - Total: 261
- Time zone: UTC+3:30 (IRST)
  - Summer (DST): UTC+4:30 (IRDT)

Khaleh Bazeh (Persian: خاله بازه, also Romanized as Khāleh Bāzeh; also known as Khālbāz and Khālbāzeh) is a village in Chehel Cheshmeh Rural District, in the Central District of Divandarreh County, Kurdistan Province, Iran. At the 2006 census, its population was 261, in 42 families. The village is populated by Kurds.
