= Kileh Kabud =

Kileh Kabud كيله كبود
- Village
- Location within Iran
- Coordinates: 35°57′46″N 46°53′45″E
- Country: Iran
- Province: Kurdistan
- County: Divandarreh
- Bakhsh: Central
- Rural District: Chehel Cheshmeh

Population (2006)
  - Total: 358
- Time zone: UTC+3:30 (IRST)
  - Summer (DST): UTC+4:30 (IRDT)

Kileh Kabud (Persian: كيله كبود, also Romanized as Kīleh Kabūd and Kīlah Kabūd; also known as Kela Kabūd and Kel Kabūd) is a village in Chehel Cheshmeh Rural District, in the Central District of Divandarreh County, Kurdistan Province, Iran. At the 2006 census, its population was 358, in 74 families. The village is populated by Kurds.
