= Bardeh Rash-e Tabriz Khatun =

Bardeh Rash-e Tabriz Khatun برده رش تبريزخاتون
- Village
- Location within Iran
- Coordinates: 35°54′22″N 46°52′58″E
- Country: Iran
- Province: Kurdistan
- County: Divandarreh
- Bakhsh: Central
- Rural District: Chehel Cheshmeh

Population (2006)
  - Total: 128
- Time zone: UTC+3:30 (IRST)
  - Summer (DST): UTC+4:30 (IRDT)

Bardeh Rash-e Tabriz Khatun (Persian: برده رش تبريزخاتون, also Romanized as Bardeh Rash-e Tabrīz Khātūn; also known as Bardarash, Bardeh Rash, Bardeh Rasheh Yangī Arakh, and Bardrash) is a village in Chehel Cheshmeh Rural District, in the Central District of Divandarreh County, Kurdistan Province, Iran. At the 2006 census, its population was 128, in 21 families. The village is populated by Kurds.
