= Zarrineh (disambiguation) =

Zarrineh is a city in Kurdistan Province, Iran

Zarrineh (Persian: زرينه) may also refer to:

- Zarneh, Ilam Province
- Zarrineh, Qorveh, Kurdistan Province
- Zarrineh-ye Varmazyar, Kurdistan Province
- Zarrineh Rural District, in Kurdistan Province
