= Darband, Kurdistan =

Darband دربند
- Village
- Location within Iran
- Coordinates: 35°55′22″N 47°13′21″E
- Country: Iran
- Province: Kurdistan
- County: Divandarreh
- Bakhsh: Central
- Rural District: Howmeh

Population (2006)
  - Total: 1,107
- Time zone: UTC+3:30 (IRST)
  - Summer (DST): UTC+4:30 (IRDT)

Darband (Persian: دربند; also known as Darban) is a village in Howmeh Rural District, in the Central District of Divandarreh County, Kurdistan Province, Iran. At the 2006 census, its population was 1,107, in 211 families. The village is populated by Kurds.
