= Nesareh-ye Sofla =

Village in Kurdistan, Iran

Nesareh-ye Sofla نساره سفلي
- Village
- Location within Iran
- Coordinates: 35°53′06″N 47°08′43″E
- Country: Iran
- Province: Kurdistan
- County: Divandarreh
- Bakhsh: Central
- Rural District: Howmeh

Population (2006)
  - Total: 272
- Time zone: UTC+3:30 (IRST)
  - Summer (DST): UTC+4:30 (IRDT)

Nesareh-ye Sofla (Persian: نساره سفلي, also Romanized as Nesāreh-ye Soflá; also known as Nasreh Kuchak, Nesāreh-ye Kūchak, Nesāreh-ye Pā’īn, Nesār-e Pā’īn, Nesār-e Soflá, and Nesār Pā’īn) is a village in Howmeh Rural District, in the Central District of Divandarreh County, Kurdistan Province, Iran. At the 2006 census, its population was 272, in 59 families. The village is populated by Kurds.
