= Saqqez River =

Coordinates: 36°23′55″N 46°27′48″E

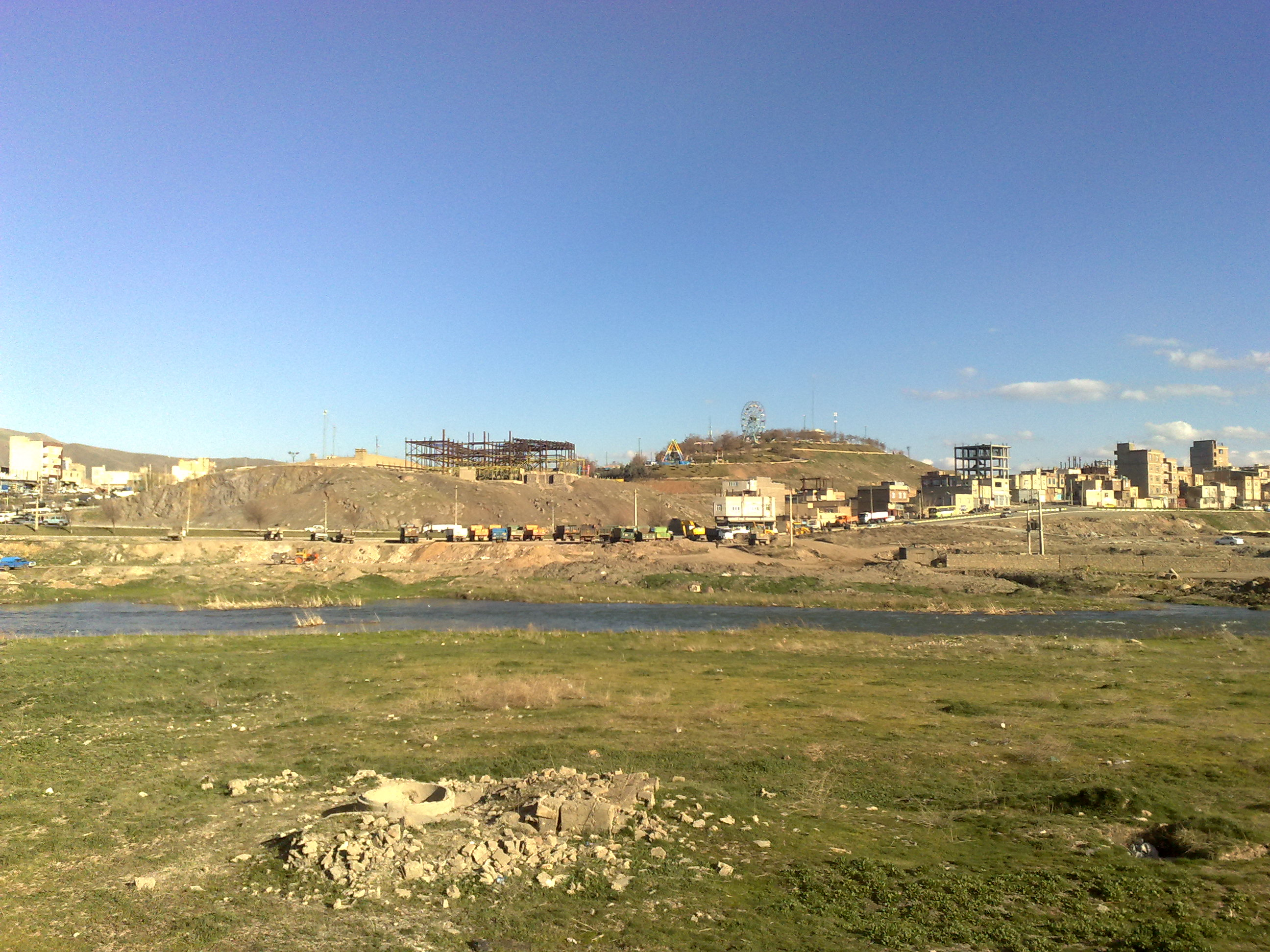

- Mouth of the Saqqez River
- Native name: چەم سەقز (Kurdish)

Location
- Country: Iran

Physical characteristics
- Mouth

The Saqqez River (Kurdish: چەم سەقز, Cham Saqqez) is located in northwestern Iran and originates from the mountains west of Saqqez.

Saqqez river is one of the main tributaries of Zarrineh River and springs from the mountains of Kileh Shin and Vazneh regions and enters the lake of Lagzi dam or Shahid Kazemi dam and finally enters Lake Urmia. This river passes through the center of Saqqez city and divides it into two parts and has given a special natural landscape and tourism to this city.

Considering that the Saqqez River has a high potential and capacity for the implementation of tourism projects and according to the memorandum concluded between the Ministries of Energy, Finance and Economic Affairs, a document was officially issued for this river. The bridge has been constructed and two recreational tourism projects (zip line and suspension bridge) are currently under construction.

Saqqez River is one of the important sources of surface water in Saqqez city, which provides the water needed for agriculture, drinking and industry along the river.
