= Kani Sefid, Divandarreh =

Kani Sefid كاني سفيد
- Village
- Location within Iran
- Coordinates: 35°59′07″N 46°53′18″E
- Country: Iran
- Province: Kurdistan
- County: Divandarreh
- Bakhsh: Central
- Rural District: Chehel Cheshmeh

Population (2006)
  - Total: 477
- Time zone: UTC+3:30 (IRST)
  - Summer (DST): UTC+4:30 (IRDT)

Kani Sefid (Persian: كاني سفيد, also Romanized as Kānī Sefīd and Kāni Safīd) is a village in Chehel Cheshmeh Rural District, in the Central District of Divandarreh County, Kurdistan Province, Iran. At the 2006 census, its population was 477, in 92 families. The village is populated by Kurds.
