= Olmai =

Olmai (Persian: الماي), also rendered as Owlma and Ulma, may refer to:

- Olmai-ye Olya
- Olmai-ye Sofla
