= Panjeh-ye Olya =

Village in Kurdistan, Iran

Panjeh-ye Olya پنجه عليا
- Village
- Location within Iran
- Coordinates: 36°05′06″N 47°25′25″E
- Country: Iran
- Province: Kurdistan
- County: Divandarreh
- Bakhsh: Central
- Rural District: Qaratureh

Population (2006)
  - Total: 84
- Time zone: UTC+3:30 (IRST)
  - Summer (DST): UTC+4:30 (IRDT)

Panjeh-ye Olya (Persian: پنجه عليا, also Romanized as Panjeh-ye ‘Olyā) is a village in Qaratureh Rural District, in the Central District of Divandarreh County, Kurdistan Province, Iran. At the 2006 census, its population was 84, in 21 families. The village is populated by Kurds.
