= Aqajeri =

Aqajeri (Persian: اقاجري), also rendered as Aqa Jari may refer to:

- Aqajeri, East Azerbaijan
- Aqa Jari, East Azerbaijan
- Aghajari, Khuzestan Province
- Aqa Jeri, Kurdistan Province
- Aqa Jari, Zanjan
- Aqchari, Qazvin
