= Nargesleh =

Nargesleh نرگسله
- Village
- Location within Iran
- Coordinates: 35°46′21″N 46°36′49″E
- Country: Iran
- Province: Kurdistan
- County: Divandarreh
- Bakhsh: Central
- Rural District: Chehel Cheshmeh

Population (2006)
  - Total: 23
- Time zone: UTC+3:30 (IRST)
  - Summer (DST): UTC+4:30 (IRDT)

Nargesleh (Persian: نرگسله, also Romanized as Nargesaleh) is a village in Chehel Cheshmeh Rural District, in the Central District of Divandarreh County, Kurdistan Province, Iran. At the 2006 census, the village population was 23, in 5 families. The village is populated by ethnic Kurds.
