= Sharifabad, Divandarreh =

Village in Kurdistan province, Iran

Sharifabad Persian: شريف آباد
- Village
- Location within Iran Location within Iran Kurdistan
- Coordinates: 35°55′24″N 46°45′48″E
- Country: Iran
- Province: Kurdistan
- County: Divandarreh
- District: Central
- Rural District: Chehel Cheshmeh

Population (2016)
  - Total: 885
- Time zone: UTC+3:30 (IRST)

Sharifabad (Persian: شريف آباد) (Note: Kurdish: شەریفاوا, romanized as Sharīfāwa) is a village in, and the capital of, Chehel Cheshmeh Rural District of the Central District of Divandarreh County, Kurdistan province, Iran.

== Demographics ==
=== Ethnicity ===
The village is populated by Kurds.

=== Population ===
At the time of the 2006 National Census, the village's population was 856 in 178 households. The following census in 2011 counted 921 people in 224 households. The 2016 census measured the population of the village as 885 people in 222 households.
