= Darreh Gavan =

Darreh Gavan دره گاوان
- Village
- Location within Iran
- Coordinates: 35°45′52″N 46°39′31″E
- Country: Iran
- Province: Kurdistan
- County: Divandarreh
- Bakhsh: Central
- Rural District: Chehel Cheshmeh

Population (2006)
  - Total: 115
- Time zone: UTC+3:30 (IRST)
  - Summer (DST): UTC+4:30 (IRDT)

Darreh Gavan (Persian: دره گاوان, also Romanized as Darreh Gāvān) is a village in Chehel Cheshmeh Rural District, in the Central District of Divandarreh County, Kurdistan Province, Iran. The 2006 census recorded the village population at 115 residents, in 26 families. The village is populated by Kurds.
