= Qarachiqran =

Qarachiqran قراچي قران
- Village
- Location within Iran
- Coordinates: 36°04′14″N 47°14′30″E
- Country: Iran
- Province: Kurdistan
- County: Divandarreh
- Bakhsh: Central
- Rural District: Qaratureh

Population (2006)
  - Total: 244
- Time zone: UTC+3:30 (IRST)
  - Summer (DST): UTC+4:30 (IRDT)

Qarachiqran (Persian: قراچي قران, also Romanized as Qarāchīqrān; also known as Qarahchī Qerān) is a village in Qaratureh Rural District, in the Central District of Divandarreh County, Kurdistan Province, Iran. At the 2006 census, its population was 244, in 54 families. The village is populated by Kurds.
