= Sheykh Heydar =

Sheykh Heydar (Persian: شيخ حيدر) may refer to:

- Sheykh Heydar, Kurdistan
- Sheykh Heydar, Lorestan
