= Expulsions in Sri Lankan Civil War =

Expulsions in Sri Lankan Civil War may refer to

- Expulsion of non-resident Tamils from Colombo
- Expulsion of Muslims from the Northern province by LTTE
