= Vazman =

Vazman or Vezman or Vozman (Persian: وزمان) may refer to:

- Vazman, Chehel Cheshmeh
- Vezman, Qaratureh
