= Aghajeri =

Aghajeri (Persian: آغاجرئ) may refer to:

- Aghajeri, East Azerbaijan
- Aghajeri, Kurdistan
