= Zarrineh-ye Varmazyar =

Zarrineh-ye Varmazyar زرينه ورمزيار
- Village
- Location within Iran
- Coordinates: 36°03′37″N 47°09′03″E
- Country: Iran
- Province: Kurdistan
- County: Divandarreh
- Bakhsh: Central
- Rural District: Qaratureh

Population (2006)
  - Total: 679
- Time zone: UTC+3:30 (IRST)
  - Summer (DST): UTC+4:30 (IRDT)

Zarrineh-ye Varmazyar (Persian: زرينه ورمزيار, also Romanized as Zarrīneh-ye Varmazyār; also known as Zarrīneh) is a village in Qaratureh Rural District, in the Central District of Divandarreh County, Kurdistan Province, Iran. At the 2006 census, its population was 679, in 117 families. The village is populated by Kurds.
