= Morad Qoli, Kurdistan =

Morad Qoli مرادقلي
- Village
- Location within Iran
- Coordinates: 36°03′24″N 47°21′00″E
- Country: Iran
- Province: Kurdistan
- County: Divandarreh
- Bakhsh: Central
- Rural District: Qaratureh

Population (2006)
  - Total: 189
- Time zone: UTC+3:30 (IRST)
  - Summer (DST): UTC+4:30 (IRDT)

Morad Qoli (Persian: مرادقلي, also Romanized as Morād Qolī; also known as Mordād Qolī) is a village in Qaratureh Rural District, in the Central District of Divandarreh County, Kurdistan Province, Iran. At the 2006 census, its population was 189, in 43 families. The village is populated by Kurds.
