= Dalan, Kurdistan =

Dalan دالان
- Village
- Location within Iran
- Coordinates: 35°53′20″N 47°12′15″E
- Country: Iran
- Province: Kurdistan
- County: Divandarreh
- Bakhsh: Central
- Rural District: Howmeh

Population (2006)
  - Total: 419
- Time zone: UTC+3:30 (IRST)
  - Summer (DST): UTC+4:30 (IRDT)

Dalan (Persian: دالان, also Romanized as Dālān) is a village in Howmeh Rural District, in the Central District of Divandarreh County, Kurdistan Province, Iran. At the 2006 census, its population was 419, in 86 families. The village is populated by Kurds.
