= Panjeh-ye Sofla =

Panjeh-ye Sofla پنجه سفلي
- Village
- Location within Iran
- Coordinates: 36°03′41″N 47°26′30″E
- Country: Iran
- Province: Kurdistan
- County: Divandarreh
- Bakhsh: Central
- Rural District: Qaratureh

Population (2006)
  - Total: 194
- Time zone: UTC+3:30 (IRST)
  - Summer (DST): UTC+4:30 (IRDT)

Panjeh-ye Sofla (Persian: پنجه سفلي, also Romanized as Panjeh-ye Soflá) is a village in Qaratureh Rural District, in the Central District of Divandarreh County, Kurdistan Province, Iran. At the 2006 census, its population was 194, in 43 families. The village is populated by Kurds.
