= Panjeh =

Panjeh (Persian: پنجه) may refer to:

- Panjeh-ye Olya
- Panjeh-ye Sofla
