= Osmania (disambiguation) =

Osmania may refer to:

- Osmania alphabet or Osmanya script, script created in the 1920s for Somali
- Osmania College, public provincial school in Jaffna, Sri Lanka
- Osmania University, public state university in Hyderabad, India named after the last nizam of Hyderabad, Mir Osman Ali Khan
  - Osmania University College for Women
  - Osmania University Common Entrance Test
  - Osmania University's College of Technology
- Osmania Medical College, medical college in Hyderabad, India
- Osmania General Hospital, hospital in Hyderabad, India
- Osmanian caliphate or Ottoman Caliphate, Islamic domain under the Ottoman dynasty (1517–1924)
- Osmanian Empire or Ottoman Empire, empire existing from c. 1299 to 1922

== See also ==
- Osman (disambiguation)
