= Vazman, Chehel Cheshmeh =

Vazman وزمان
- Village
- Location within Iran
- Coordinates: 35°56′42″N 46°36′18″E
- Country: Iran
- Province: Kurdistan
- County: Divandarreh
- Bakhsh: Central
- Rural District: Chehel Cheshmeh

Population (2006)
  - Total: 89
- Time zone: UTC+3:30 (IRST)
  - Summer (DST): UTC+4:30 (IRDT)

Vazman (Persian: وزمان, also Romanized as Vazmān) is a village in Chehel Cheshmeh Rural District, in the Central District of Divandarreh County, Kurdistan Province, Iran. At the 2006 census, its population was 89, in 15 families. The village is populated by Kurds.
