= Gavshaleh =

Gavshaleh (Persian: گاوشله) may refer to:

- Gavshaleh, Divandarreh
- Gavshaleh, Saqqez
