= Morad Qoli =

Morad Qoli (Persian: مرادقلي) may refer to:

- Morad Qoli, Kurdistan
- Morad Qoli, Sistan and Baluchestan
