= Ebrahimabad, Divandarreh =

Village in Kurdistan province, Iran

Ebrahimabad Persian: ابراهيم آباد
- Village
- Location within Iran Location within Iran Kurdistan
- Coordinates: 35°58′21″N 46°50′02″E
- Country: Iran
- Province: Kurdistan
- County: Divandarreh
- District: Central
- Rural District: Chehel Cheshmeh

Population (2016)
  - Total: 1,062
- Time zone: UTC+3:30 (IRST)

Ebrahimabad (Persian: ابراهيم آباد) (Note: Also romanized as Ebrāhīmābād and Ibrahīmābād) is a village in Chehel Cheshmeh Rural District of the Central District of Divandarreh County, Kurdistan province, Iran.

== Demographics ==
=== Ethnicity ===
The village is populated by Kurds.

=== Population ===
At the time of the 2006 National Census, the village's population was 1,024 in 199 households. The following census in 2011 counted 1,060 people in 250 households. The 2016 census measured the population of the village as 1,062 people in 247 households. It was the most populous village in its rural district.
