= Suleh =

Suleh or Sooleh or Sowleh (Persian: سوله) may refer to:

- Suleh, Kurdistan
- Suleh, Razavi Khorasan
- Suleh, Zanjan
- Suleh (film), a 1946 Bollywood film
