= Sheykh Heydar, Kurdistan =

Sheykh Heydar شيخ حيدر
- Village
- Location within Iran
- Coordinates: 35°51′30″N 46°56′43″E
- Country: Iran
- Province: Kurdistan
- County: Divandarreh
- Bakhsh: Central
- Rural District: Howmeh

Population (2006)
  - Total: 179
- Time zone: UTC+3:30 (IRST)
  - Summer (DST): UTC+4:30 (IRDT)

Sheykh Heydar (Persian: شيخ حيدر, also Romanized as Sheykh Ḩeydar) is a village in Howmeh Rural District, in the Central District of Divandarreh County, Kurdistan Province, Iran. At the 2006 census, its population was 179, in 36 families. The village is populated by Kurds.
