= Best, Kurdistan =

Best بست
- Village
- Location within Iran
- Coordinates: 35°53′06″N 46°35′16″E
- Country: Iran
- Province: Kurdistan
- County: Divandarreh
- Bakhsh: Central
- Rural District: Chehel Cheshmeh

Population (2006)
  - Total: 667
- Time zone: UTC+3:30 (IRST)
  - Summer (DST): UTC+4:30 (IRDT)

Best (Persian: بست) is a village in Chehel Cheshmeh Rural District, in the Central District of Divandarreh County, Kurdistan Province, Iran. At the 2006 census, the village population comprised 667 residents, in 130 families. The village is populated by Kurds.
