= Kazemi Dam =

Shahid Kazemi Dam
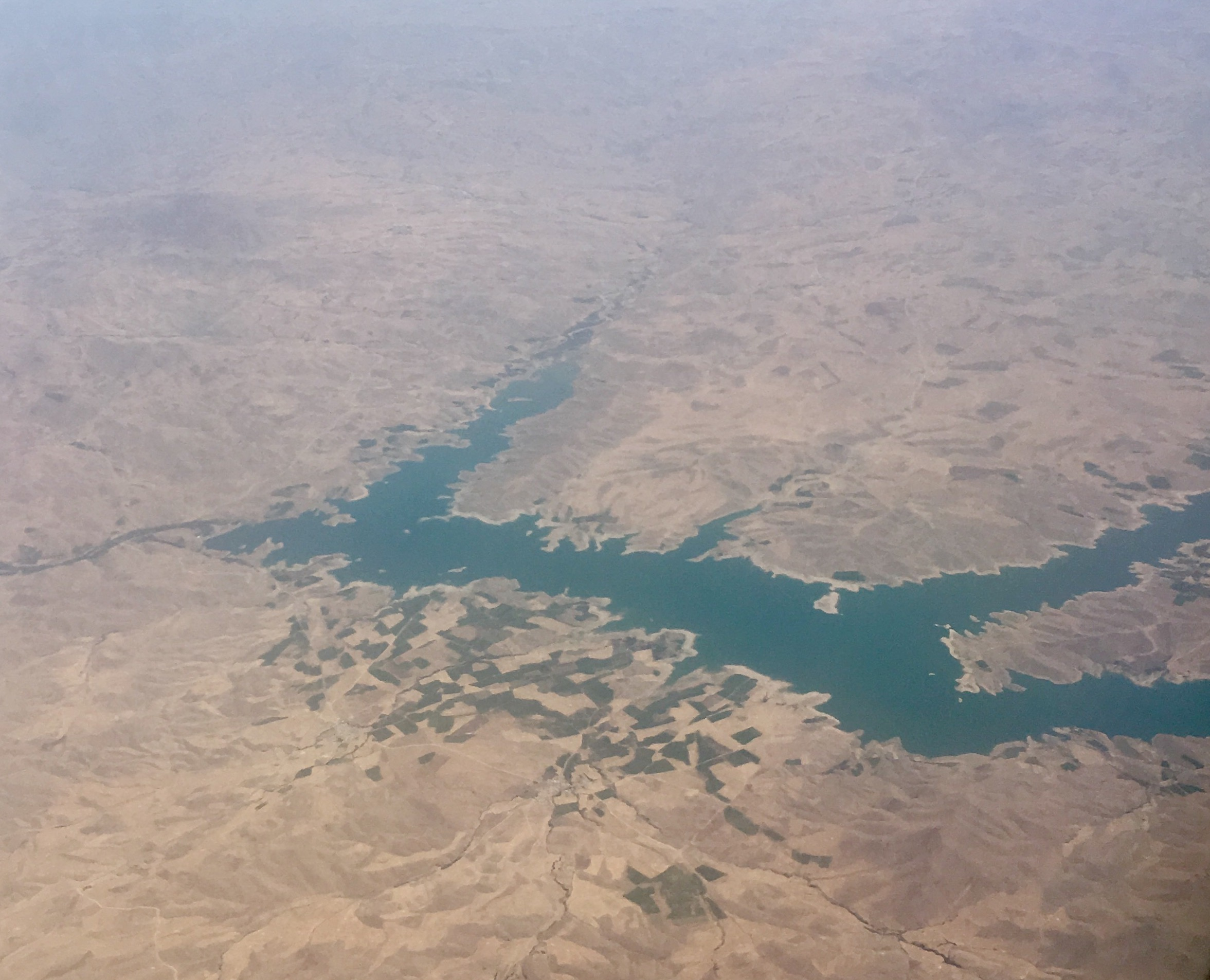
- Kazemi dam from above
- Interactive map of Shahid Kazemi Dam
- Location: Bukan, Iran
- Purpose: Power, irrigation
- Status: Operational
- Construction began: 1967
- Opening date: 1971

Dam and spillways
- Type of dam: Dam with clay core
- Impounds: Zarrineh River
- Height: 50 m (164 ft)
- Length: 720 m (2,362 ft)

Reservoir
- Total capacity: 800,000,000 m^{3} (648,571 acre⋅ft)

Power Station
- Installed capacity: 87 MW

Shahid Kazemi Dam (originally named Kourosh Dam and also known as the Shahid Kazemi Bukan Dam and Bukan Dam) is a clay core dam on the Zarrineh River in the Zagros Mountains range, located near Bukan in West Azarbaijan Province, Iran.

The crown of this dam is located 25 km Northeast of Bukan on the border of Kurdistan province and West Azarbaijan Province. The reservoir and lake of the dam are located in Kurdistan province and its catchment area is from Chehel Cheshmeh and Kileh Shin mountains in Zagros mountains between Saqqez and Baneh and Divandarreh.

This Dam was constructed to store water for supplying drinking water to cities, irrigation and produce hydroelectric power.

== Geography ==
In Kazemi Dam Lake, various islands have been formed that are the habitats of animal species, especially a number of rare ones, including species of birds. Larus are one of the most important species of birds that live in the islands and around the lake, which itself has different species. This lake has surprised and delighted people and environmental experts because the habitat of these creatures is mostly on the shores of large seas and lakes.

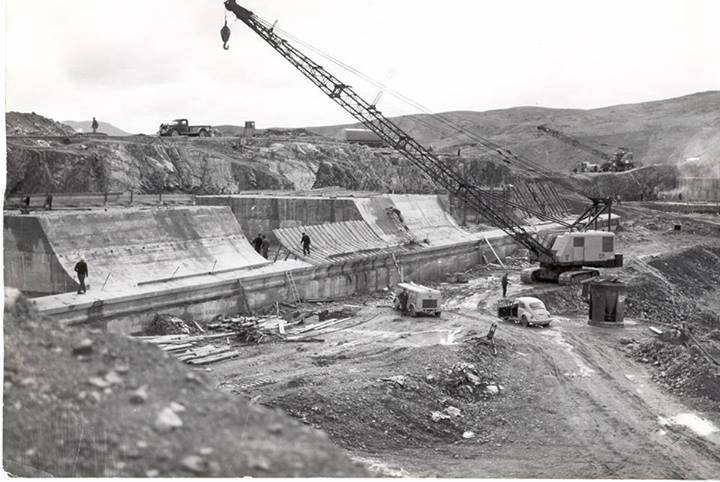
Construction of Bukan Dam 1967

Nazargah Island is the largest island in the lake. One of the advantages of these islands is the protection of rare bird species from the danger of being hunted by other animals such as wolves, snakes and foxes. Also, millions of fish are raised in this lake every year and are sent to the markets by fishermen during the fishing season.

== See also ==
- Dams in Iran
- List of power stations in Iran
- Zagros Mountains
