= Zarrineh River =

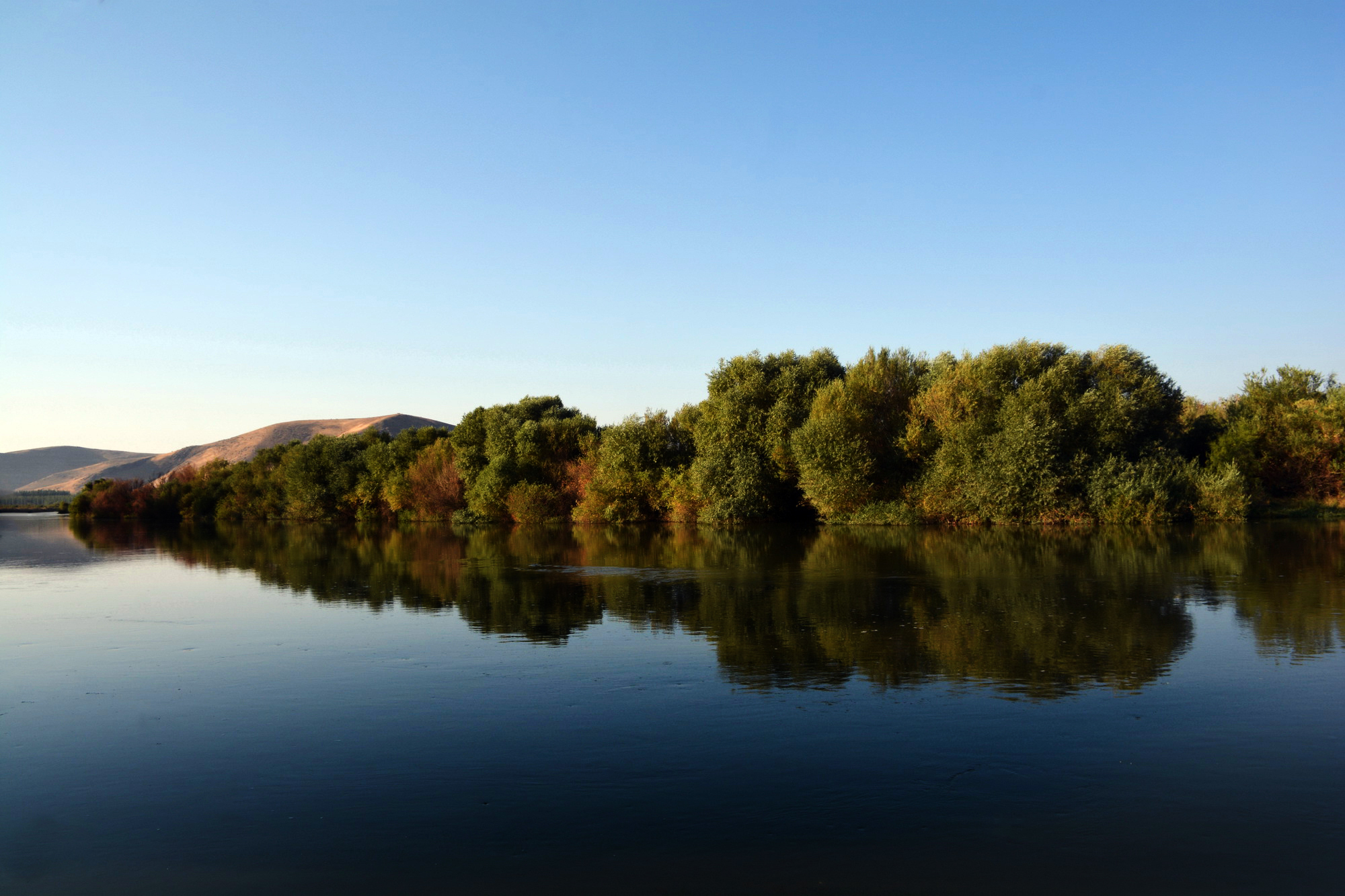

- Mouth of the Zarrineh

Location
- Country: Iran

Physical characteristics
- Mouth
  - coordinates: 37°14′46″N 45°50′05″E

The Zarrineh Rud (Persian: زرینه‌رود, lit. 'golden river' Zarrineh-Rud, Zarriné-Rūd, Zarrinehrood) is a river in Kurdistan Province and West Azerbaijan province, Iran.

It is 302 km long, arising in the Zagros Mountains of Kurdistan Province south of Saqqez, where it is also known as the Jaghatu River (Jaghatu Chay). Its real name is Jegatoo, a well known name among local residents over the centuries.

== Names ==
The name Zarrīneh Rūd, meaning "golden river" in Persian, is historically attested by Rashid al-Din Hamadani in his entry for the year 1263 (661 AH).

According to Vladimir Minorsky, the name Jaghātū is most likely derived from the Mongolian word jaqa, meaning "border" or "bank", with the possessive suffix -tu. Minorsky wrote that such a name was fitting, since "the Jaghatu in its sweep encloses a definite geographical region".

Since about the mid-20th century, the old name of Zarrineh Rud has come back into use, and the nearby Tatavu has been similarly renamed Simineh Rud, or "silver river".

Minorsky reconstructed an even earlier name of the river as *Vālā-rūd, from the "Balaráthō" (Βαλαράθω) given by Theophylact Simocatta, and also in the Life of Mar Yahballaha which refers to a river "called in Mongolian Jaghatuy and in Persian Vakya-rud".

== Course ==
The Zarrineh rises near the Shiler Valley, an important communication route between Mesopotamia and the Iranian plateau which forms a deep salient of Iraqi territory into Iran. It then flows north towards Lake Urmia. On the way, its course makes a long sweep to the east. It receives the Saruq River as a tributary before bending back to the west and eventually emptying into the lake. Near the lake, the Zarrineh comes very close to meeting the Simineh River, and the two might have merged to form one river at some point in the past.

The Zarrineh river is dammed at Shahid Kazemi Dam or Sadd-e Kurosh-e Kabir (Dam of Cyrus the Great) at the border with West Azerbaijan, producing a large reservoir. There is a power plant there. The river continues north and slightly west past the cities of Shahin Dezh, Kashavar and Miandoab and into Lake Urmia. Although it is perennial, unlike many of the streams in the Urmia Basin, its flow is still markedly seasonal with a discharge into Lake Urmia ranging from 500 cubic metres (0.41 acre⋅ft) per second to only 10 cubic metres (0.0081 acre⋅ft) per second at the end of the dry season.

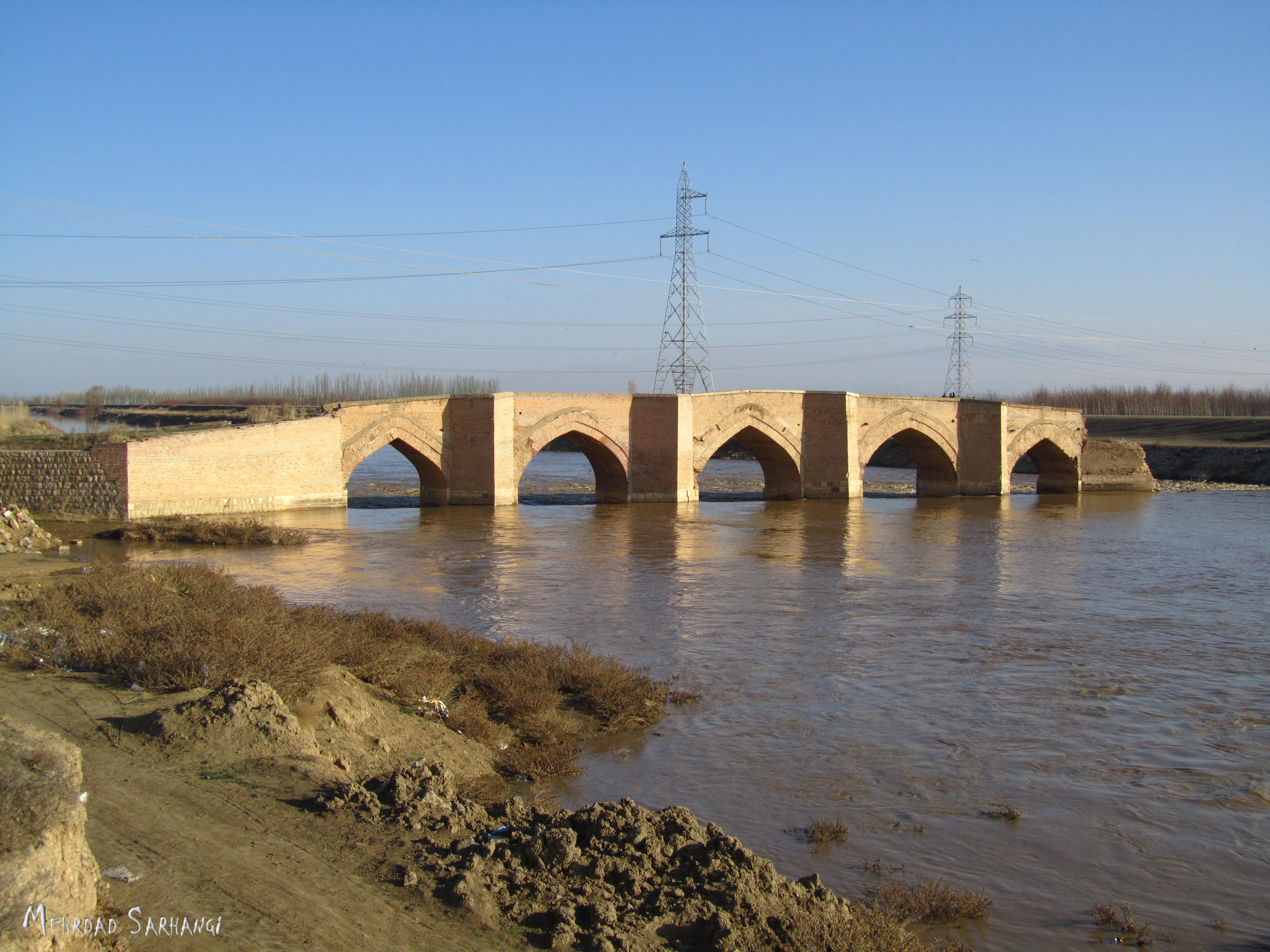
Miandoab historic bridge.

== Tributaries ==
The tributaries of the Zarrineh River include:

- The Saqqez Cham River with its source in the Kileh Shin's mountain west of Saqqez,
- The Khor Khoreh River which runs through Saqqez,
- The Zarrineh River which has the same name with the main river and comes from ChlChama mountains located between Saqqez, Divandarreh and Marivan.
- The Sarooq with its source in the Takab region, and
- The Morli (Leila) with its source in the Sahand region.
