= Osman =

Osman is the Persian and Turkish transliteration and derived from the Arabic masculine given name Uthman (Arabic: عُثْمان ‘uthmān) or an English surname. Osman or Osmans may refer to:

== People ==
- Osman (name), people with the name and surname
- Osman I (1258–1326), founder of the Ottoman Empire
- Osman II (1604–1622), Ottoman sultan
- Osman III (1699–1757), Ottoman sultan
- Osmans, another spelling of Ottomans
- Osman I of the Maldives, the Sultan of the Maldives in 1377
- Osman II of the Maldives, the Sultan of Maldives from 1420 to 1421
- Mir Osman Ali Khan, 7th and last Nizam (ruler) of Hyderabad

== Places ==
- Osmanabad, a district of Maharashtra, India
- Osmannagar (alternative name for Sultanabad, Karimnagar), village located in Karimnagar district, Andhra Pradesh, India
- Osman, Iran, a village in Kermanshah Province, Iran
- Osman, Kurdistan, a village in Kurdistan Province, Iran
- Osman, Wisconsin, United States

== Fish ==
- False osman (Schizopygopsis stoliczkai)
- Naked osman (Gymnodiptychus dybowskii)
- Scaly osman (Diptychus maculatus)
- Several species in the genus Oreoleuciscus

== Other uses ==
- Osman (crater), a lunar crater
- Osman (video game), an arcade game by Mitchell Corporation
- A fictional merchant in the role-playing game Skies of Arcadia
- Osman warning, issued by British police etc. to warn someone of a death threat
- Osman (poem), an epic poem by Ivan Gundulić

== See also ==
- Osmania (disambiguation)
  - Osmania University, university in Hyderabad, India, named after founder Mir Osman Ali Khan
- Osmin, the name of a Turkish character in Mozart's operas Zaide and Die Entführung aus dem Serail
- Osmond (disambiguation)
- Usman (disambiguation)
