= Darban =

Darban (Persian: در بان or دربن) may refer to:

- Darban, Bushehr (در بان - Darbān)
- Darban, Kurdistan (دربن - Darban)
