= Aqa Jeri =

Aqa Jeri آقاجري
- Village
- Location within Iran
- Coordinates: 35°53′27″N 47°07′42″E
- Country: Iran
- Province: Kurdistan
- County: Divandarreh
- Bakhsh: Central
- Rural District: Howmeh

Population (2006)
  - Total: 429
- Time zone: UTC+3:30 (IRST)
  - Summer (DST): UTC+4:30 (IRDT)

Aqa Jeri (Persian: آقاجري, also Romanized as Āqā Jerī and Āqā Jarī; also known as Aghajan, Āgha Jāri, and Āghājerī) is a village in Howmeh Rural District, in the Central District of Divandarreh County, Kurdistan Province, Iran. At the 2006 census, its population was 429, in 91 families. The village is populated by Kurds.
