= Gavshaleh, Divandarreh =

Village in Kurdistan province, Iran

Gavshaleh Persian: گاوشله
- Village
- Location within Iran Location within Iran Kurdistan
- Coordinates: 36°00′54″N 47°09′07″E
- Country: Iran
- Province: Kurdistan
- County: Divandarreh
- District: Central
- Rural District: Qaratureh

Population (2016)
  - Total: 876
- Time zone: UTC+3:30 (IRST)

Gavshaleh (Persian: گاوشله) (Note: Also romanized as Gāvshaleh) is a village in, and the capital of, Qaratureh Rural District of the Central District of Divandarreh County, Kurdistan province, Iran.

== Demographics ==
=== Ethnicity ===
The village is populated by Kurds.

=== Population ===
At the time of the 2006 National Census, the village's population was 853 in 169 households. The following census in 2011 counted 881 people in 206 households. The 2016 census measured the population of the village as 876 people in 241 households.
