= Ali Kahrizi =

Ali Kahrizi (Persian: عالي كهريزي) may refer to:

- Ali Kahrizi, Arshaq
- Ali Kahrizi, Moradlu
