= Usman =

Usman may refer to:

== People ==
- Usman (name), a name of Arabic origin
- Hadiza Bala Usman (born 1976), Nigerian activist and politician
- Kamaru Usman, a Nigerian-American mixed martial artist in the Ultimate Fighting Championship
- Usman Janatin, an Indonesian marine executed for murder in Singapore
- Usman Nurmagomedov, a Dagestani mixed martial artist in the Professional Fighters League
- Usman, a fictional character portrayed by Mukul Nag in the 2005 Indian film Apaharan

== Places ==
- Usman, alternative name of Vezman, a village in Kurdistan Province, Iran
- Usman Urban Settlement, a municipal formation which Usman Town Under District Jurisdiction in Usmansky District of Lipetsk Oblast, Russia is incorporated as
- Usman, Russia, a town in Lipetsk Oblast, Russia
- Usman (river), a river in Russia; left tributary of the Voronezh

== See also ==
- Osman (disambiguation)
- Ottoman Empire, also known as Osmanli, Empire of Osman (modern-day Turkey)
- Uthman
- Tropical Depression Usman
