= Ojaq Qeshlaqi =

Village in Ardabil province, Iran

Ojaq Qeshlaqi Persian: اجاق قشلاقي
- Village
- Location within Iran
- Coordinates: 38°35′10″N 47°54′18″E
- Country: Iran
- Province: Ardabil
- County: Meshgin Shahr
- District: Arshaq
- Rural District: Arshaq-e Shomali

Population (2016)
  - Total: 43
- Time zone: UTC+3:30 (IRST)

Ojaq Qeshlaqi (Persian: اجاق قشلاقي) (Note: Also romanized as Ojāq Qeshlāqī; also known as Ojāq Qeshlāq) is a village in Arshaq-e Shomali Rural District of Arshaq District in Meshgin Shahr County, Ardabil province, Iran.

== Demographics ==
=== Population ===
At the time of the 2006 National Census, the village's population was 49 in 11 households. The following census in 2011 counted 46 people in 12 households. The 2016 census measured the population of the village as 43 people in 13 households.
