= Koli-ye Olya, Ardabil =

Village in Ardabil province, Iran

Koli-ye Olya Persian: كلي عليا
- Village
- Location within Iran
- Country: Iran
- Province: Ardabil
- County: Meshgin Shahr
- District: Arshaq
- Rural District: Arshaq-e Shomali

Population (2016)
  - Total: 538
- Time zone: UTC+3:30 (IRST)

Koli-ye Olya (Persian: كلي عليا) (Note: Also romanized as Kolī-ye ‘Olyā; also known as Kolū-ye Bālā and Kolū-ye ‘Olyā) is a village in Arshaq-e Shomali Rural District of Arshaq District in Meshgin Shahr County, Ardabil province, Iran.

== Demographics ==
=== Population ===
At the time of the 2006 National Census, the village's population was 603 in 123 households. The following census in 2011 counted 593 people in 149 households. The 2016 census measured the population of the village as 538 people in 163 households.
