= Aq Qasemlu =

Village in Ardabil province, Iran

Aq Qasemlu Persian: اق قاسملو
- Village
- Location within Iran
- Coordinates: 38°38′29″N 47°57′01″E
- Country: Iran
- Province: Ardabil
- County: Meshgin Shahr
- District: Arshaq
- Rural District: Arshaq-e Shomali

Population (2016)
  - Total: 233
- Time zone: UTC+3:30 (IRST)

Aq Qasemlu (Persian: اق قاسملو) (Note: Also romanized as Āq Qāsemlū; also known as Āq Qāselmū, Qareh Qāsemlū, and Qāsemlū) is a village in Arshaq-e Shomali Rural District of Arshaq District in Meshgin Shahr County, Ardabil province, Iran.

== Demographics ==
=== Population ===
At the time of the 2006 National Census, the village's population was 330 in 76 households. The following census in 2011 counted 302 people in 75 households. The 2016 census measured the population of the village as 233 people in 79 households.
