= Omidcheh, Meshgin Shahr =

Village in Ardabil province, Iran

Omidcheh Persian: اميدچه
- Village
- Location within Iran
- Coordinates: 38°44′03″N 47°54′21″E
- Country: Iran
- Province: Ardabil
- County: Meshgin Shahr
- District: Arshaq
- Rural District: Arshaq-e Shomali

Population (2016)
  - Total: 78
- Time zone: UTC+3:30 (IRST)

Omidcheh (Persian: اميدچه) (Note: Also romanized as Omīdcheh; also known as Emichah) is a village in Arshaq-e Shomali Rural District of Arshaq District in Meshgin Shahr County, Ardabil province, Iran.

== Demographics ==
=== Population ===
At the time of the 2006 National Census, the village's population was 121 in 28 households. The following census in 2011 counted 92 people in 25 households. The 2016 census measured the population of the village as 78 people in 23 households.
