= Qareh Malham =

Village in Ardabil province, Iran

Qareh Malham Persian: قره ملهم
- Village
- Location within Iran
- Coordinates: 38°39′29″N 47°54′17″E
- Country: Iran
- Province: Ardabil
- County: Meshgin Shahr
- District: Arshaq
- Rural District: Arshaq-e Shomali

Population (2016)
  - Total: 11
- Time zone: UTC+3:30 (IRST)

Qareh Malham (Persian: قره ملهم) (Note: Also known as Malham) is a village in Arshaq-e Shomali Rural District of Arshaq District in Meshgin Shahr County, Ardabil province, Iran.

== Demographics ==
=== Population ===
At the time of the 2006 National Census, the village's population was 24 in four households. The following census in 2011 counted a population below the reporting threshold. The 2016 census measured the population of the village as 11 people in four households.
