= Nesareh-ye Olya =

Village in Kurdistan province, Iran

Nesareh-ye Olya Persian: نساره عليا
- Village
- Location within Iran Location within Iran Kurdistan
- Coordinates: 35°52′18″N 47°05′40″E
- Country: Iran
- Province: Kurdistan
- County: Divandarreh
- District: Central
- Rural District: Howmeh

Population (2016)
  - Total: 1,812
- Time zone: UTC+3:30 (IRST)

Nesareh-ye Olya (Persian: نساره عليا) (Note: Also romanized as Nesāreh-ye ‘Olyā; also known as Nasreh Būzūrg, Naşreh-ye Bozorg, Nesār Bālā, Nesār-e-Bālā, Nesāreh-ye Bālā, Nesāreh-ye Bozorg, and Nesāreh-ye Kaūrā) is a village in, and the capital of, Howmeh Rural District of the Central District of Divandarreh County, Kurdistan province, Iran.

== Demographics ==
=== Ethnicity ===
The village is populated by Kurds.

=== Population ===
At the time of the 2006 National Census, the village's population was 1,187 in 259 households. The following census in 2011 counted 1,784 people in 399 households. The 2016 census measured the population of the village as 1,812 people in 463 households. It was the most populous village in its rural district.
