= Hammamlu, Ardabil =

Village in Ardabil province, Iran

Hammamlu Persian: حماملو
- Village
- Location within Iran
- Coordinates: 38°40′28″N 47°58′32″E
- Country: Iran
- Province: Ardabil
- County: Meshgin Shahr
- District: Arshaq
- Rural District: Arshaq-e Shomali

Population (2016)
  - Total: 85
- Time zone: UTC+3:30 (IRST)

Hammamlu (Persian: حماملو) (Note: Also romanized as Ḩammāmlū) is a village in Arshaq-e Shomali Rural District of Arshaq District in Meshgin Shahr County, Ardabil province, Iran.

== Demographics ==
=== Population ===
At the time of the 2006 National Census, the village's population was 138 in 30 households. The following census in 2011 counted 115 people in 37 households. The 2016 census measured the population of the village as 85 people in 31 households.
