= Khalifeh Davud =

Village in Ardabil province, Iran

Khalifeh Davud Persian: خليفه داود
- Village
- Location within Iran
- Coordinates: 38°44′40″N 47°53′19″E
- Country: Iran
- Province: Ardabil
- County: Meshgin Shahr
- District: Arshaq
- Rural District: Arshaq-e Shomali

Population (2016)
  - Total: 188
- Time zone: UTC+3:30 (IRST)

Khalifeh Davud (Persian: خليفه داود) (Note: Also romanized as Khalīfeh Dāvūd) is a village in Arshaq-e Shomali Rural District of Arshaq District in Meshgin Shahr County, Ardabil province, Iran.

== Demographics ==
=== Population ===
At the time of the 2006 National Census, the village's population was 278 in 67 households. The following census in 2011 counted 197 people in 51 households. The 2016 census measured the population of the village as 188 people in 67 households.
