= Sheykh Azimlu =

Village in Ardabil province, Iran

Sheykh Azimlu Persian: شيخ عظيم لو
- Village
- Location within Iran
- Country: Iran
- Province: Ardabil
- County: Meshgin Shahr
- District: Arshaq
- Rural District: Arshaq-e Shomali

Population (2016)
  - Total: 262
- Time zone: UTC+3:30 (IRST)

Sheykh Azimlu (Persian: شيخ عظيم لو) (Note: Also romanized as Sheik Azimloo, Sheykh ‘Az̧īmlū, and Sheykh ‘Azīmlū; also known as Sheykh ‘Az̧īmū) is a village in Arshaq-e Shomali Rural District of Arshaq District in Meshgin Shahr County, Ardabil province, Iran.

== Demographics ==
=== Population ===
At the time of the 2006 National Census, the village's population was 328 in 59 households. The following census in 2011 counted 272 people in 65 households. The 2016 census measured the population of the village as 262 people in 80 households.
