= Darreh Beyglu =

Village in Ardabil province, Iran

Darreh Beyglu Persian: دره بيگ لو
- Village
- Location within Iran
- Coordinates: 38°41′33″N 47°59′41″E
- Country: Iran
- Province: Ardabil
- County: Meshgin Shahr
- District: Arshaq
- Rural District: Arshaq-e Shomali

Population (2016)
  - Total: 51
- Time zone: UTC+3:30 (IRST)

Darreh Beyglu (Persian: دره بيگ لو) (Note: Also romanized as Darreh Beyglū) is a village in Arshaq-e Shomali Rural District of Arshaq District in Meshgin Shahr County, Ardabil province, Iran.

== Demographics ==
=== Population ===
At the time of the 2006 National Census, the village's population was 175 in 34 households. The following census in 2011 counted 98 people in 32 households. The 2016 census measured the population of the village as 51 people in 17 households.
