= Koli-ye Sofla, Ardabil =

Village in Ardabil province, Iran

Koli-ye Sofla Persian: كلي سفلي
- Village
- Location within Iran
- Country: Iran
- Province: Ardabil
- County: Meshgin Shahr
- District: Arshaq
- Rural District: Arshaq-e Shomali

Population (2016)
  - Total: 188
- Time zone: UTC+3:30 (IRST)

Koli-ye Sofla (Persian: كلي سفلي) (Note: Also romanized as Kolī-ye Soflá; also known as Kolū-ye Pā'īn and Kolū-ye Soflá) is a village in Arshaq-e Shomali Rural District of Arshaq District in Meshgin Shahr County, Ardabil province, Iran.

== Demographics ==
=== Population ===
At the time of the 2006 National Census, the village's population was 275 in 55 households. The following census in 2011 counted 231 people in 58 households. The 2016 census measured the population of the village as 188 people in 57 households.
