= Arshaq-e Shomali Rural District =

Rural district in Ardabil province, Iran

Arshaq-e Shomali Rural District Persian: دهستان ارشق شمالي
- Rural District
- Location within Iran
- Coordinates: 38°41′N 47°55′E
- Country: Iran
- Province: Ardabil
- County: Meshgin Shahr
- District: Arshaq
- Established: 1987
- Capital: Qowsheh-ye Sofla

Population (2016)
  - Total: 4,237
- Time zone: UTC+3:30 (IRST)

Arshaq-e Shomali Rural District (Persian: دهستان ارشق شمالي) is in Arshaq District of Meshgin Shahr County, Ardabil province, Iran. Its capital is the village of Qowsheh-ye Sofla.

== Demographics ==
=== Population ===
At the time of the 2006 National Census, the rural district's population was 5,672 in 1,222 households. There were 4,664 inhabitants in 1,247 households at the following census of 2011. The 2016 census measured the population of the rural district as 4,237 in 1,355 households. The most populous of its 25 villages was Davahchi-ye Olya, with 752 people.

=== Other villages in the rural district ===
- Abbas Kandi
- Ali Kahrizi
- Aq Qasemlu
- Darreh Beyglu
- Eynallah Kandi
- Hajji Seyflu
- Hammamlu
- Khalifeh Davud
- Kharabeh-ye Qaderlu
- Koli-ye Olya
- Koli-ye Sofla
- Ojaq Qeshlaqi
- Olmai-ye Olya
- Olmai-ye Sofla
- Omidcheh
- Qarahchi-ye Olya
- Qarahchi-ye Sofla
- Qareh Malham
- Qowsheh-ye Olya
- Sheykh Azimlu
- Shurgol
