= Abbas Kandi, Ardabil =

Village in Ardabil province, Iran

Abbas Kandi Persian: عباس كندي
- Village
- Location within Iran
- Coordinates: 38°42′53″N 47°55′41″E
- Country: Iran
- Province: Ardabil
- County: Meshgin Shahr
- District: Arshaq
- Rural District: Arshaq-e Shomali

Population (2016)
  - Total: 63
- Time zone: UTC+3:30 (IRST)

Abbas Kandi (Persian: عباس كندي) (Note: Also romanized as ‘Abbās Kandī) is a village in Arshaq-e Shomali Rural District of Arshaq District in Meshgin Shahr County, Ardabil province, Iran.

== Demographics ==
=== Population ===
At the time of the 2006 National Census, the village's population was 120 in 26 households. The following census in 2011 counted 102 people in 28 households. The 2016 census measured the population of the village as 63 people in 20 households.
