= Kani Sefid, Karaftu =

Kani Sefid كاني سفيد
- Village
- Location within Iran
- Coordinates: 36°05′21″N 46°52′48″E
- Country: Iran
- Province: Kurdistan
- County: Divandarreh
- Bakhsh: Karaftu
- Rural District: Zarrineh

Population (2006)
  - Total: 191
- Time zone: UTC+3:30 (IRST)
  - Summer (DST): UTC+4:30 (IRDT)

Kani Sefid (Persian: كاني سفيد, also Romanized as Kānī Sefīd) is a village in Zarrineh Rural District, Karaftu District, Divandarreh County, Kurdistan Province, Iran. At the 2006 census, its population was 191, in 36 families. The village is populated by Kurds.
