= Davahchi-ye Olya =

Village in Ardabil province, Iran

Davahchi-ye Olya Persian: دوه چي عليا
- Village
- Location within Iran
- Coordinates: 38°39′06″N 47°52′38″E
- Country: Iran
- Province: Ardabil
- County: Meshgin Shahr
- District: Arshaq
- Rural District: Arshaq-e Shomali

Population (2016)
  - Total: 752
- Time zone: UTC+3:30 (IRST)

Davahchi-ye Olya (Persian: دوه چي عليا) (Note: Also romanized as Davahchī-ye ‘Olyā; also known as Davechī-ye Bālā) is a village in Arshaq-e Shomali Rural District of Arshaq District in Meshgin Shahr County, Ardabil province, Iran.

== Demographics ==
=== Population ===
At the time of the 2006 National Census, the village's population was 754 in 168 households. The following census in 2011 counted 810 people in 216 households. The 2016 census measured the population of the village as 752 people in 240 households. It was the most populous village in its rural district.
