= Kharabeh-ye Qaderlu =

Village in Ardabil province, Iran

Kharabeh-ye Qaderlu Persian: خرابه قادرلو
- Village
- Location within Iran
- Coordinates: 38°35′55″N 47°55′22″E
- Country: Iran
- Province: Ardabil
- County: Meshgin Shahr
- District: Arshaq
- Rural District: Arshaq-e Shomali

Population (2016)
  - Total: 14
- Time zone: UTC+3:30 (IRST)

Kharabeh-ye Qaderlu (Persian: خرابه قادرلو) (Note: Also romanized as Kharābeh-ye Qāderlū; also known as Kharābeh-ye Qadīrlū) is a village in Arshaq-e Shomali Rural District of Arshaq District in Meshgin Shahr County, Ardabil province, Iran.

== Demographics ==
=== Population ===
At the time of the 2006 National Census, the village's population was 16 in five households. The following census in 2011 counted 21 people in seven households. The 2016 census measured the population of the village as 14 people in five households.
