= Hajji Seyflu =

Village in Ardabil province, Iran

Hajji Seyflu Persian: حاج سيفلو
- Village
- Location within Iran
- Coordinates: 38°41′51″N 47°58′49″E
- Country: Iran
- Province: Ardabil
- County: Meshgin Shahr
- District: Arshaq
- Rural District: Arshaq-e Shomali

Population (2016)
  - Total: 51
- Time zone: UTC+3:30 (IRST)

Hajji Seyflu (Persian: حاج سيفلو) (Note: Also romanized as Ḩājjī Seyflū) is a village in Arshaq-e Shomali Rural District of Arshaq District in Meshgin Shahr County, Ardabil province, Iran.

== Demographics ==
=== Population ===
At the time of the 2006 National Census, the village's population was 130 in 28 households. The following census in 2011 counted 66 people in 23 households. The 2016 census measured the population of the village as 51 people in 17 households.
