= Eynallah Kandi =

Village in Ardabil province, Iran

Eynallah Kandi Persian: عين الله كندي
- Village
- Location within Iran
- Coordinates: 38°43′02″N 47°55′25″E
- Country: Iran
- Province: Ardabil
- County: Meshgin Shahr
- District: Arshaq
- Rural District: Arshaq-e Shomali

Population (2016)
  - Total: 34
- Time zone: UTC+3:30 (IRST)

Eynallah Kandi (Persian: عين الله كندي) (Note: Also romanized as ʿEynallah Kandī; also known as Beyg Bāghlū) is a village in Arshaq-e Shomali Rural District of Arshaq District in Meshgin Shahr County, Ardabil province, Iran.

== Demographics ==
=== Population ===
At the time of the 2006 National Census, the village's population was 161 in 29 households. The following census in 2011 counted 86 people in 25 households. The 2016 census measured the population of the village as 34 people in nine households.
