= Eshaqabad, Sirjan =

Eshaqabad اسحق اباد
- Village
- Location within Iran
- Coordinates: 29°40′10″N 55°46′02″E
- Country: Iran
- Province: Kerman
- County: Sirjan
- Bakhsh: Pariz
- Rural District: Saadatabad

Population (2006)
  - Total: 150
- Time zone: UTC+3:30 (IRST)
  - Summer (DST): UTC+4:30 (IRDT)

Eshaqabad (Persian: اسحق اباد, also Romanized as Esḩāqābād; also known as Eshagh Abad) is a village in Saadatabad Rural District, Pariz District, Sirjan County, Kerman Province, Iran. At the 2006 census, its population was 150, in 36 families.
