= Qarahchi-ye Olya =

Village in Ardabil province, Iran

Qarahchi-ye Olya Persian: قره چي عليا
- Village
- Location within Iran
- Coordinates: 38°42′30″N 47°56′59″E
- Country: Iran
- Province: Ardabil
- County: Meshgin Shahr
- District: Arshaq
- Rural District: Arshaq-e Shomali

Population (2016)
  - Total: 187
- Time zone: UTC+3:30 (IRST)

Qarahchi-ye Olya (Persian: قره چي عليا) (Note: Also romanized as Qarahchī-ye ‘Olyā; also known as Qarahchī-ye Bālā) is a village in Arshaq-e Shomali Rural District of Arshaq District in Meshgin Shahr County, Ardabil province, Iran.

== Demographics ==
=== Population ===
At the time of the 2006 National Census, the village's population was 306 in 70 households. The following census in 2011 counted 199 people in 62 households. The 2016 census measured the population of the village as 187 people in 66 households.
