= Qowsheh-ye Sofla =

Village in Ardabil province, Iran

Qowsheh-ye Sofla Persian: قوشه سفلي
- Village
- Location within Iran
- Coordinates: 38°43′42″N 47°56′20″E
- Country: Iran
- Province: Ardabil
- County: Meshgin Shahr
- District: Arshaq
- Rural District: Arshaq-e Shomali

Population (2016)
  - Total: 494
- Time zone: UTC+3:30 (IRST)

Qowsheh-ye Sofla (Persian: قوشه سفلي) (Note: Also romanized as Qowsheh-ye Soflá and Qūsheh-ye Soflá; also known as Qosheh, Qowsheh-ye Pā'īn, and Qūsheh) is a village in, and the capital of, Arshaq-e Shomali Rural District in Arshaq District of Meshgin Shahr County, Ardabil province, Iran.

== Demographics ==
=== Population ===
At the time of the 2006 National Census, the village's population was 664 in 154 households. The following census in 2011 counted 465 people in 122 households. The 2016 census measured the population of the village as 494 people in 155 households.
