= Kani Sefid, Salmas =

Kani Sefid كاني سفيد
- Village
- Location within Iran
- Coordinates: 38°03′36″N 44°52′58″E
- Country: Iran
- Province: West Azerbaijan
- County: Salmas
- Bakhsh: Central
- Rural District: Kenarporuzh

Population (2006)
  - Total: 225
- Time zone: UTC+3:30 (IRST)
  - Summer (DST): UTC+4:30 (IRDT)

Kani Sefid (Persian: كاني سفيد, also Romanized as Kānī Sefīd) is a village in Kenarporuzh Rural District, in Central District of Salmas County, West Azerbaijan Province, Iran. According to the 2006 census, the population was 225, residing in 40 families.
