= Kani Sefid, Saqqez =

Kani Sefid كاني سفيد
- Village
- Location within Iran
- Coordinates: 36°20′42″N 46°44′47″E
- Country: Iran
- Province: Kurdistan
- County: Saqqez
- Bakhsh: Ziviyeh
- Rural District: Gol Tappeh

Population (2006)
  - Total: 166
- Time zone: UTC+3:30 (IRST)
  - Summer (DST): UTC+4:30 (IRDT)

Kani Sefid (Persian: كاني سفيد, also Romanized as Kānī Sefīd) is a village in Gol Tappeh Rural District, Ziviyeh District, Saqqez County, Kurdistan Province, Iran. At the 2006 census, its population was 166, in 37 families. The village is populated by Kurds.
