= Osmania College =

Location
- Muslim College Road; Jaffna, Jaffna District, Northern Province; Sri Lanka
- Coordinates: 9°40′41.60″N 80°00′20.90″E

Information
- School type: Public provincial 2
- School district: Jaffna Education Zone
- Authority: Northern Provincial Council
- School number: 1001025
- Teaching staff: 13
- Grades: 1-11
- Gender: Mixed
- Age range: 5-16

Osmania College is a provincial school in Jaffna, Sri Lanka. It was once a prominent educational institution for the city's Muslim community.

== History ==
Osmania College, located in Jaffna's Moor Town suburb, conducted classes ranging from kindergarten to Advanced Level. In 1980 it had roughly 800 students. By 1990 it had grown to 1,800. It closed in 1990 after the expulsion of Muslims from Northern Province by the Liberation Tigers of Tamil Eelam; the city's Muslims were told to gather at the college on 30 October 1990, and then given two hours to leave, with only the clothes on their backs and Rs 50 in cash. Afterwards, the school buildings were destroyed in fighting due to the Sri Lankan Civil War, and furniture was looted.

=== Reopening ===
With the resettlement of Muslim families back into Jaffna, Osmania College reopened in 2003, but without facilities for holding lessons. By 2005, it had grown to 200 students, up to the Ordinary Level; teachers held classes on the ground floor of single, crumbling building which remained of the former campus. However, as suspicions grew that the ceasefire would break down, Muslims again left the city, and by early 2006 only 35 students remained at the school. In 2009, Jaffna District member of parliament and Minister of Social Services Douglas Devananda stated that the government would assist in the rebuilding of the college, as part of a wider plan of community resettlement and rebuilding in Jaffna.

The construction of Osmania College was started in 1960. General Muslim peoples in Jaffna have donated to construct the building. On 7 January 1963 Osmania College was declared open by Badiuddeen Mahmood, the then Minister of Education. When opening, the school had only ground floor of the current building. Upstairs building was constructed later with the allocation of fund by the Minister Badiuddeen Mahmood.

GCE Advance Level was started in 1974 by the then Principal A.H. Hameem. Osmania College has produced a countable number of graduates. The college has created BA, BBA, BCom, BUMS (Unani Medical Science) and BEng Graduates. In sports the School has achieved many awards. In 1975, the School Third Eleven Soccer Team won the Jaffna School Soccer Association (JSSA) Championship under the captainship of Safeek Ramees. In 1985 the School Second Eleven became champions in JSSA tournament under the captaincy of Mohamed Sharief Mohamed Jansin.

The school's performance in athletic events is also remarkable. The school had students who won circuit level, district level championships in 100M, 200M, 400M, 800M, 1500M, 3000M and 5000M, High jump, Long jump, Shot put and Discus Throw.

Damaged building were reconstructed time to time from 2011. Still, few buildings are to be reconstructed.

== See also ==
- List of schools in Northern Province, Sri Lanka
