= Eshqabad, Taft =

Eshqabad عشق اباد
- Village
- Location within Iran
- Coordinates: 31°30′53″N 53°46′06″E
- Country: Iran
- Province: Yazd
- County: Taft
- Bakhsh: Central
- Rural District: Dehshir

Population (2006)
  - Total: 28
- Time zone: UTC+3:30 (IRST)
  - Summer (DST): UTC+4:30 (IRDT)

Eshqabad (Persian: عشق اباد, also Romanized as ‘Eshqābād) is a village in Dehshir Rural District, in the Central District of Taft County, Yazd Province, Iran. At the 2006 census, its population was 28, in 10 families.
