= Eshaqabad, Kerman =

Eshaqabad اسحاق اباد
- Village
- Location within Iran
- Coordinates: 30°28′50″N 57°18′43″E
- Country: Iran
- Province: Kerman
- County: Kerman
- Bakhsh: Central
- Rural District: Derakhtengan

Population (2006)
  - Total: 49
- Time zone: UTC+3:30 (IRST)
  - Summer (DST): UTC+4:30 (IRDT)

Eshaqabad (Persian: اسحاق اباد, also Romanized as Esḩāqābād) is a village in Derakhtengan Rural District, in the Central District of Kerman County, Kerman Province, Iran. At the 2006 census, its population was 49, in 13 families.
