= Kani Sefid, Marivan =

Kani Sefid كاني سفيد
- Village
- Location within Iran
- Coordinates: 35°34′18″N 46°06′07″E
- Country: Iran
- Province: Kurdistan
- County: Marivan
- Bakhsh: Khav and Mirabad
- Rural District: Khav and Mirabad

Population (2006)
  - Total: 273
- Time zone: UTC+3:30 (IRST)
  - Summer (DST): UTC+4:30 (IRDT)

Kani Sefid (Persian: كاني سفيد, also Romanized as Kānī Sefīd; also known as Kani Sefid Marivan, Kānī Sepīkeh, Kānī Sepīkeh Līv-e Bālā, and Kāni Spikeh) is a village in Khav and Mirabad Rural District, Khav and Mirabad District, Marivan County, Kurdistan Province, Iran. At the 2006 census, its population was 273, in 53 families. The village is populated by Kurds.
