= Eshaqabad, Lorestan =

Eshaqabad اسحاق اباد
- Village
- Location within Iran
- Coordinates: 33°45′55″N 47°54′47″E
- Country: Iran
- Province: Lorestan
- County: Selseleh
- Bakhsh: Firuzabad
- Rural District: Qalayi

Population (2006)
  - Total: 82
- Time zone: UTC+3:30 (IRST)
  - Summer (DST): UTC+4:30 (IRDT)

Eshaqabad (Persian: اسحاق اباد, also romanized as Esḩāqābād; also known as Esḩāqābād-e Shīneh) is a village in Qalayi Rural District, Firuzabad District, Selseleh County, Lorestan Province, Iran. At the 2006 census, its population was 82, in 19 families.
