= Eshqabad, Kerman =

Eshqabad عشق اباد
- Village
- Location within Iran
- Coordinates: 29°21′00″N 56°49′07″E
- Country: Iran
- Province: Kerman
- County: Rabor
- Bakhsh: Central
- Rural District: Rabor

Population (2006)
  - Total: 24
- Time zone: UTC+3:30 (IRST)
  - Summer (DST): UTC+4:30 (IRDT)

Eshqabad (Persian: عشق اباد, also Romanized as ‘Eshqābād) is a village in Rabor Rural District, in the Central District of Rabor County, Kerman Province, Iran. At the 2006 census, its population was 24, in 5 families.
