= Qarahchi-ye Sofla =

Village in Ardabil province, Iran

Qarahchi-ye Sofla Persian: قره چي سفلي
- Village
- Location within Iran
- Country: Iran
- Province: Ardabil
- County: Meshgin Shahr
- District: Arshaq
- Rural District: Arshaq-e Shomali

Population (2016)
  - Total: 202
- Time zone: UTC+3:30 (IRST)

Qarahchi-ye Sofla (Persian: قره چي سفلي) (Note: Also romanized as Qarahchī-ye Soflá and Qarehchī-ye Soflá; also known as Qarahchī-ye Pā'īn) is a village in Arshaq-e Shomali Rural District of Arshaq District in Meshgin Shahr County, Ardabil province, Iran.

== Demographics ==
=== Population ===
At the time of the 2006 National Census, the village's population was 248 in 54 households. The following census in 2011 counted 205 people in 55 households. The 2016 census measured the population of the village as 202 people in 65 households.
