= Sheykh Heydar, Lorestan =

Sheykh Heydar شيخ حيدر
- Village
- Location within Iran
- Coordinates: 33°32′23″N 48°28′54″E
- Country: Iran
- Province: Lorestan
- County: Khorramabad
- Bakhsh: Central
- Rural District: Dehpir-e Shomali

Population (2006)
  - Total: 69
- Time zone: UTC+3:30 (IRST)
  - Summer (DST): UTC+4:30 (IRDT)

Sheykh Heydar (Persian: شيخ حيدر, also Romanized as Sheykh Ḩeydar) is a village in Dehpir-e Shomali Rural District, in the Central District of Khorramabad County, Lorestan Province, Iran. At the 2006 census, its population was 69, in 14 families.
