= Osman, Iran =

Osman عثمان
- Village
- Location within Iran
- Coordinates: 34°21′54″N 45°56′24″E
- Country: Iran
- Province: Kermanshah
- County: Sarpol-e Zahab
- Bakhsh: Central
- Rural District: Qaleh Shahin

Population (2006)
  - Total: 218
- Time zone: UTC+3:30 (IRST)
  - Summer (DST): UTC+4:30 (IRDT)

Osman (Persian: عثمان, also Romanized as ‘Os̄mān; also known as Īmān ‘Os̄mān) is a village in Qaleh Shahin Rural District, in the Central District of Sarpol-e Zahab County, Kermanshah Province, Iran. At the 2006 census, its population was 218, in 50 families. The village is populated by Kurds.
