= Ottoman Turkish (disambiguation) =

Ottoman Turkish may refer to:

- Ottoman Turkish, the language used by Ottoman Turks, the Turkic ethnic group in the Ottoman Turkey
- Ottoman Turkey (Ottoman Empire)
- Ottoman Turks
