= Vezman, Qaratureh =

Village in Kurdistan province, Iran

Vezman Persian: وزمان
- Village
- Location within Iran Location within Iran Kurdistan
- Coordinates: 35°59′48″N 47°03′05″E
- Country: Iran
- Province: Kurdistan
- County: Divandarreh
- District: Central
- Rural District: Qaratureh

Population (2016)
  - Total: 1,007
- Time zone: UTC+3:30 (IRST)

Vezman (Persian: وزمان) (Note: Also romanized as Vazmān, Vezmān, and Vozmān; also known as ‘Os̄mān and Usmān) is a village in Qaratureh Rural District of the Central District of Divandarreh County, Kurdistan province, Iran.

== Demographics ==
=== Ethnicity ===
The village is populated by Kurds.

=== Population ===
At the time of the 2006 National Census, the village's population was 937 in 184 households. The following census in 2011 counted 973 people in 240 households. The 2016 census measured the population of the village as 1,007 people in 244 households. It was the most populous village in its rural district.
