= Osmania University Common Entrance Test =

Post graduate test at Osmania University

Osmania University Common Entrance Test or OUCET is a post graduate eligibility test conducted by Osmania University. There are about 19,000 seats at Osmania University, Palamuru University, Mahabubnagar; Mahatma Gandhi University, Nalgonda and Telangana University, Nizamabad. The entrance test is held in May/June every year.

== History ==
Osmania University started conducting the common entrance test for universities located in Telangana region since 2011.

== Format and timing ==
The test is held in 52 subjects that includes 39 PG courses, 10 PG diploma courses and 3 five years integrated courses.

The entrance examination is a two-hour multiple choice question paper. The subject wise ranks are sorted and sent to students.

== Resu[lt ==
The results are out in June and counseling for allotment of seats is held in end of June and the academic year starts in July.

== Seats distribution ==
Total seats - 18,881

University campus colleges seats at 4 universities are 4500 and the rest in affiliated colleges.

- Osmania University - 13,027
- Telangana University - 1,990
- Mahatma Gandhi University - 2630
- Palamuru University - 1234
