= Suleh, Razavi Khorasan =

Suleh سوله
- Village
- Location within Iran
- Coordinates: 36°55′04″N 58°23′01″E
- Country: Iran
- Province: Razavi Khorasan
- County: Nishapur
- Bakhsh: Sarvelayat
- Rural District: Sarvelayat

Population (2006)
  - Total: 99
- Time zone: UTC+3:30 (IRST)
  - Summer (DST): UTC+4:30 (IRDT)

Suleh (Persian: سوله, also Romanized as Sūleh) is a village in Sarvelayat Rural District, Sarvelayat District, Nishapur County, Razavi Khorasan Province, Iran. At the 2006 census, its population was 99, in 23 families.
