= Eshaqabad, Shahr-e Babak =

Eshaqabad اسحق اباد
- Village
- Location within Iran
- Coordinates: 30°23′00″N 55°06′00″E
- Country: Iran
- Province: Kerman
- County: Shahr-e Babak
- Bakhsh: Dehaj
- Rural District: Jowzam

Population (2006)
  - Total: 48
- Time zone: UTC+3:30 (IRST)
  - Summer (DST): UTC+4:30 (IRDT)

Eshaqabad (Persian: اسحق اباد, also Romanized as Esḩāqābād; also known as Esḩāq and Is-hāq) is a village in Jowzam Rural District, Dehaj District, Shahr-e Babak County, Kerman Province, Iran. At the 2006 census, its population was 48, in 11 families.
