= Eshqabad, Birjand =

Eshqabad عشق اباد
- Village
- Location within Iran
- Coordinates: 33°12′25″N 59°09′54″E
- Country: Iran
- Province: South Khorasan
- County: Birjand
- Bakhsh: Central
- Rural District: Fasharud

Population (2016)
  - Total: 11
- Time zone: UTC+3:30 (IRST)
  - Summer (DST): UTC+4:30 (IRDT)

Eshqabad (Persian: عشق اباد, also Romanized as ‘Eshqābād and Ishqābād) is a village in Fasharud Rural District, in the Central District of Birjand County, South Khorasan Province, Iran. At the 2016 census, its population was 11, in 6 families.
