= Kanemat =

Kanemat كانعمت
- Village
- Location within Iran
- Coordinates: 35°49′49″N 46°25′29″E
- Country: Iran
- Province: Kurdistan
- County: Saqqez
- Bakhsh: Sarshiv
- Rural District: Chehel Cheshmeh-ye Gharbi

Population (2006)
  - Total: 247
- Time zone: UTC+3:30 (IRST)
  - Summer (DST): UTC+4:30 (IRDT)

Kanemat (Persian: كانعمت, also Romanized as Kāne‘mat and Kān ‘Mat) is a village in Chehel Cheshmeh-ye Gharbi Rural District, Sarshiv District, Saqqez County, Kurdistan Province, Iran. At the 2006 census, the village population comprised 247 people, in 42 families. The village is populated by Kurds.
