= Darreh Hovan =

Darreh Hovan دره هوان
- Village
- Location within Iran
- Coordinates: 35°54′46″N 46°31′45″E
- Country: Iran
- Province: Kurdistan
- County: Saqqez
- Bakhsh: Ziviyeh
- Rural District: Khvor Khvoreh

Population (2006)
  - Total: 269
- Time zone: UTC+3:30 (IRST)
  - Summer (DST): UTC+4:30 (IRDT)

Darreh Hovan (Persian: دره هوان, also Romanized as Darreh Hovān) is a village in Khvor Khvoreh Rural District, Ziviyeh District, Saqqez County, Kurdistan Province, Iran. At the 2006 census, the village had 269 residents, in 52 families. The village is populated by Kurds.
