= Ali Kahrizi, Arshaq =

Village in Ardabil province, Iran

Ali Kahrizi Persian: عالي كهريزي
- Village
- Location within Iran
- Coordinates: 38°44′03″N 47°53′48″E
- Country: Iran
- Province: Ardabil
- County: Meshgin Shahr
- District: Arshaq
- Rural District: Arshaq-e Shomali

Population (2016)
  - Total: 44
- Time zone: UTC+3:30 (IRST)

Ali Kahrizi (Persian: عالي كهريزي) (Note: Also romanized as ‘Alī Kahrīzī and ‘Ālī Kahrīzī) is a village in Arshaq-e Shomali Rural District of Arshaq District in Meshgin Shahr County, Ardabil province, Iran.

== Demographics ==
=== Population ===
At the time of the 2006 National Census, the village's population was 121 in 24 households. The following census in 2011 counted 75 people in 22 households. The 2016 census measured the population of the village as 44 people in 16 households.
