= Dalan, Luxi =

Dalan Town
- Town

Chinese transcription(s)
  - Simplified: 达岚镇
  - Traditional: 達嵐鎮
  - Pinyin: Dálán Zhèn
- Location within Hunan Location within China
- Coordinates: 28°01′08″N 110°00′09″E
- Country: China
- Province: Hunan
- Autonomous prefecture: Xiangxi
- County: Luxi County

Area
  - Total: 104.9 km^{2} (40.5 sq mi)

Population (2010)
  - Total: 15,590
  - Density: 148.6/km^{2} (384.9/sq mi)
- Time zone: UTC+8 (China Standard)

Dalan (simplified Chinese: 达岚镇; traditional Chinese: 達嵐鎮; pinyin: Dálán Zhèn) is a town located in Luxi County in Xiangxi, Hunan, China.
