= Olmai-ye Olya =

Village in Ardabil province, Iran

Olmai-ye Olya Persian: الماي عليا
- Village
- Location within Iran
- Coordinates: 38°43′36″N 47°59′27″E
- Country: Iran
- Province: Ardabil
- County: Meshgin Shahr
- District: Arshaq
- Rural District: Arshaq-e Shomali

Population (2016)
  - Total: 239
- Time zone: UTC+3:30 (IRST)

Olmai-ye Olya (Persian: الماي عليا) (Note: Also romanized as Olmāī-ye ‘Olyā; also known as Owlmā-ye Bālā and Ūlmā-ye ‘Olyā) is a village in Arshaq-e Shomali Rural District of Arshaq District in Meshgin Shahr County, Ardabil province, Iran.

== Demographics ==
=== Population ===
At the time of the 2006 National Census, the village's population was 169 in 36 households. The following census in 2011 counted 169 people in 47 households. The 2016 census measured the population of the village as 239 people in 76 households.
