= Morad Qoli, Sistan and Baluchestan =

Morad Qoli مرادقلي
- Village
- Location within Iran
- Coordinates: 31°07′48″N 61°43′48″E
- Country: Iran
- Province: Sistan and Baluchestan
- County: Hirmand
- Bakhsh: Central
- Rural District: Margan

Population (2006)
  - Total: 24
- Time zone: UTC+3:30 (IRST)
  - Summer (DST): UTC+4:30 (IRDT)

Morad Qoli (Persian: مرادقلي, also Romanized as Morād Qolī) is a village in Margan Rural District, in the Central District of Hirmand County, Sistan and Baluchestan Province, Iran. At the 2006 census, its population was 24, in 5 families.
