= Expulsion of Muslims from the Northern Province of Sri Lanka =

Event in October 1990

- Part of the Sri Lankan civil war (Eelam War II)
- Location: Northern Province, Sri Lanka
- Date: October 1990
- Target: Muslims of the Northern Province
- Attack type: Ethnic cleansing, forced displacement, looting, extortion
- Deaths: At least 14 (1 jeweller beaten to death; 13 abducted businessmen presumed dead; additional deaths in crossfire)
- Victims: 72,000 displaced (over 14,400 families)
- Perpetrator: Liberation Tigers of Tamil Eelam (LTTE)
- Assailant: Karikalan (leader of the Eastern wing delegation)
- Motive: Retaliation for alleged Muslim collaboration with Sri Lankan security forces and anti-Tamil violence in the Eastern Province

The Expulsion of Muslims from the Northern Province of Sri Lanka was the forcible displacement of 72,000 Sri Lankan Muslims from the Northern Province carried out by the Liberation Tigers of Tamil Eelam (LTTE) in October 1990, during the Sri Lankan Civil War. Some observers describe this as an act of "ethnic cleansing". The LTTE stated that this expulsion was carried out in retaliation for Muslim participation in atrocities committed against Tamils in the Eastern Province.

== Background ==
In the early years of Tamil political struggle for linguistic parity, a few Sri Lankan Muslims as a Tamil-speaking people identified with the Tamil cause and participated in it. Even during the early years of Tamil militant struggle for separatism, a few Muslim youths joined Tamil militant groups, though some were also forcefully recruited. However, despite being a Tamil-speaking group, the Muslims see themselves as a different ethnicity or use their religion as their primary identity. In the Eastern Province with the largest concentration of Muslims in the country, Muslims sought to chart their separate political trajectory with the formation of the Sri Lanka Muslim Congress (SLMC) in 1981, which was reinforced by the state's fomenting violence between the two communities in the mid-1980s. Due to this the Muslims felt that if the goal of Tamil Eelam was reached they would be a "minority in a minority state", and the SLMC was strongly opposed to the idea of Tamil Eelam. The situation was further aggravated with the creation of the Muslim Home Guard by the Sri Lankan Government, leading to violent clashes between the two communities. Tensions between Tamils and Muslims were at an all-time high in the Eastern Province. However, in the Tamil-majority Northern Province where Muslims were a small minority, the relations between the two communities were peaceful.

== Expulsion ==
The plan to expel the northern Muslims was initiated by Karikalan, the LTTE's political head of the Eastern Province. LTTE's eastern wing was incensed by Muslim LTTE cadres defecting to the government and Muslim collaboration with security forces in anti-Tamil violence. A delegation led by Karikalan went to the north to exert pressure on the LTTE hierarchy to take actions against the Muslims, which was reinforced by the LTTE's paranoia about potential fifth column among northern Muslims due to several incidents. As a result, LTTE cadres from the Eastern Province, where anti-Muslim feeling was rife, were brought to the north to carry out the expulsion. Local LTTE leaders were puzzled and disturbed, as were most local Tamils who along with the Catholic clergy protested.

The first expulsion was of 1,500 people in Chavakachcheri. After this, many Muslims in Kilinochchi and Mannar were forced to leave their homeland. The turn of Jaffna came on 30 October 1990, when LTTE trucks drove through the streets ordering Muslim families to assemble at Osmania College. On the early morning of October 30, the LTTE ordered the northern Muslims to leave in two hours and leave behind every material possession that belonged to the community or face death. Each person was allowed only 150 rupees each and only one set of clothes. Muslim protest was silenced by the threat of firearms. Women and girls were stripped of jewels. Some LTTE women cadres were brutal even pulling out ear studs with blood spurting in the ear lobes. At least 35 wealthy Muslim businessmen were abducted and detained by the LTTE. Some Muslim jewellers were tortured for details of hidden gold. One jeweller was killed by the beatings in front of the others. Later huge sums of money were demanded for their release. Some paid up to 3 million. The abducted persons were released in stages over the years. 13 people however never returned and were presumed dead. Moreover, the LTTE had expropriated Muslim homes, lands, and businesses and threatened Muslim families with death if they attempt to return.

The entire Muslim population was expelled from Jaffna. According to a 1981 census (the last official count), the total Muslim population in Jaffna was 14,844. In total, over 14,400 Muslim families, roughly 72,000 people, were forcibly evicted from LTTE-controlled areas of the Northern Province. This includes 38,000 people from Mannar, 20,000 from Jaffna and Kilinochchi, 9,000 from Vavuniya and 5,000 from Mullaitivu. The flight to government-controlled areas was dangerous. Muslims found themselves in the crossfire between the LTTE and the army, and some were killed and injured.

Most of the Muslims were resettled in the Puttalam District, though the Jaffna Muslim refugees can be found in other parts of Sri Lanka as well.

Tareek, a former resident of Jaffna, recounted the expulsion as follows:

"People believed you could take what you could carry, but at every junction the LTTE took things from us...they told us, "If you ever talk about this, we will shoot you." In the end, we had only the clothes we were wearing…My younger sisters couldn't even keep the jewellery they were wearing...For us Muslims, it's a big thing when these young men are touching our women's ears and necks to take the jewellery off. When the women cadres searched our young women, they took them behind a screen...Inside, they took all the money...We came here with bare pockets."

== Aftermath ==
=== Apologies and resettlement by LTTE ===
In a 1994 interview with the BBC, the LTTE leader Velupillai Prabhakaran expressed his regret over the expulsion and stated that the Muslims belonged to Jaffna and would permit their resettlement once normalcy was restored. Later on, in a press conference in Kilinochchi in 2002, the LTTE political strategist Anton Balasingham appeared alongside the LTTE leader and explained that they had already apologized to the Muslims and that the Tamil homeland also belonged to the Muslim people. Balasingham also expressed that the expulsion of the Muslims from Jaffna was a political blunder which could not be justified and said that the LTTE leadership would be willing to resettle them in the northern district. Since the declaration of ceasefire in 2002, Muslims started travelling to and from Jaffna. A floating population of 2000 Muslims was estimated to have been found in Jaffna. Two mosques were reopened as was the Osmaniya College which had 60 students enrolled. Since many Jaffna Muslims had prospered and found better economic prospects elsewhere, majority of them decided not to resettle in Jaffna and many sold off their property.

=== Hindrances for the return of internally displaced individuals to their traditional lands ===
On October 10, 2012, the government of Sri Lanka published several gazettes that effectively expanded the Wilpattu National Park's boundary to include northern provinces' regions. The original boundary of the park had enclosed the Puttalam District in the south and Anuradhapura District in the east. However, this expansion of the boundary prevented many people from returning to their homes and traditional lands within the newly designated park boundaries. The move was made under section 3 of the Forest Conservation Ordinance, chapter 451.

== See also ==
- List of attacks attributed to the LTTE
- Expulsion of non-resident Tamils from Colombo
- Kattankudy mosque massacre
