= Olmai-ye Sofla =

Village in Ardabil province, Iran

Olmai-ye Sofla Persian: الماي سفلي
- Village
- Location within Iran
- Coordinates: 38°43′23″N 47°59′31″E
- Country: Iran
- Province: Ardabil
- County: Meshgin Shahr
- District: Arshaq
- Rural District: Arshaq-e Shomali

Population (2016)
  - Total: 80
- Time zone: UTC+3:30 (IRST)

Olmai-ye Sofla (Persian: الماي سفلي) (Note: Also romanized as Olmāī-ye Soflá; also known as Owlmā-ye Pā'īn and Ūlmā-ye Soflá) is a village in Arshaq-e Shomali Rural District of Arshaq District in Meshgin Shahr County, Ardabil province, Iran.

== Demographics ==
=== Population ===
At the time of the 2006 National Census, the village's population was 99 in 25 households. The following census in 2011 counted 82 people in 24 households. The 2016 census measured the population of the village as 80 people in 27 households.
