= Eshqabad, Sarvelayat =

Eshqabad عشق اباد
- Village
- Location within Iran
- Coordinates: 36°52′33″N 58°24′11″E
- Country: Iran
- Province: Razavi Khorasan
- County: Nishapur
- Bakhsh: Sarvelayat
- Rural District: Sarvelayat

Population (2006)
  - Total: 199
- Time zone: UTC+3:30 (IRST)
  - Summer (DST): UTC+4:30 (IRDT)

Eshqabad (Persian: عشق اباد, also Romanized as ‘Eshqābād and ‘Āsheqābād) is a village in Sarvelayat Rural District, Sarvelayat District, Nishapur County, Razavi Khorasan Province, Iran. At the 2006 census, its population was 199, in 60 families.
