= Qowsheh-ye Olya =

Village in Ardabil province, Iran

Qowsheh-ye Olya Persian: قوشه عليا
- Village
- Location within Iran
- Coordinates: 38°44′31″N 47°56′39″E
- Country: Iran
- Province: Ardabil
- County: Meshgin Shahr
- District: Arshaq
- Rural District: Arshaq-e Shomali

Population (2016)
  - Total: 263
- Time zone: UTC+3:30 (IRST)

Qowsheh-ye Olya (Persian: قوشه عليا) (Note: Also romanized as Qowsheh-ye ‘Olyā; also known as Qowsheh-ye Bālā and Qūsheh Bālā) is a village in Arshaq-e Shomali Rural District of Arshaq District in Meshgin Shahr County, Ardabil province, Iran.

== Demographics ==
=== Population ===
At the time of the 2006 National Census, the village's population was 375 in 78 households. The following census in 2011 counted 269 people in 68 households. The 2016 census measured the population of the village as 263 people in 72 households.
