= Eshqabad, Mazul =

Eshqabad عشق اباد
- Village
- Location within Iran
- Coordinates: 36°14′32″N 58°44′00″E
- Country: Iran
- Province: Razavi Khorasan
- County: Nishapur
- Bakhsh: Central
- Rural District: Mazul

Population (2006)
  - Total: 332
- Time zone: UTC+3:30 (IRST)
  - Summer (DST): UTC+4:30 (IRDT)

Eshqabad (Persian: عشق اباد, also Romanized as ‘Eshqābād) is a village in Mazul Rural District, in the Central District of Nishapur County, Razavi Khorasan Province, Iran. At the 2006 census, its population was 332, in 80 families.
