= Qusheh Qui =

Qusheh Qui قوشه قويي
- Village
- Location within Iran
- Coordinates: 35°48′33″N 48°46′09″E
- Country: Iran
- Province: Qazvin
- County: Avaj
- Bakhsh: Central District
- Rural District: Hesar-e Valiyeasr

Population (2006)
  - Total: 187
- Time zone: UTC+3:30 (IRST)

Qusheh Qui (Persian: قوشه قويي, also Romanized as Qūsheh Qū’ī, Ghoosheh Ghoo’i, Gosheh Kūyu, Qowsheh Qū’ī, and Qūshah Qū’ī) is a village in Hesar-e Valiyeasr Rural District, Central District, Avaj County, Qazvin Province, Iran. At the 2006 census, its population was 187, in 41 families.
