= Eshqabad-e Kohneh =

Eshqabad-e Kohneh عشق ابادكهنه
- Village
- Location within Iran
- Coordinates: 36°04′37″N 58°53′41″E
- Country: Iran
- Province: Razavi Khorasan
- County: Nishapur
- Bakhsh: Central
- Rural District: Darbqazi

Population (2006)
  - Total: 34
- Time zone: UTC+3:30 (IRST)
  - Summer (DST): UTC+4:30 (IRDT)

Eshqabad-e Kohneh (Persian: عشق ابادكهنه, also Romanized as ‘Eshqābād-e Kohneh; also known as ‘Eshqābād) is a village in Darbqazi Rural District, in the Central District of Nishapur County, Razavi Khorasan Province, Iran. At the 2006 census, its population was 34, in 13 families.
