= Gavshaleh, Saqqez =

Gavshaleh گاوشله
- Village
- Location within Iran
- Coordinates: 36°19′13″N 46°19′06″E
- Country: Iran
- Province: Kurdistan
- County: Saqqez
- Bakhsh: Central
- Rural District: Sara

Population (2006)
  - Total: 186
- Time zone: UTC+3:30 (IRST)
  - Summer (DST): UTC+4:30 (IRDT)

Gavshaleh (Persian: گاوشله, also Romanized as Gāvshaleh; also known as Gāveh Sheleh) is a village in Sara Rural District, in the Central District of Saqqez County, Kurdistan Province, Iran. At the 2006 census, its population was 186, in 32 families. The village is populated by Kurds.
