= Expulsion of non-resident Tamils from Colombo =

2007 deportation of Tamils from Colombo, Sri Lanka

The expulsion of non-resident Tamils from Colombo was an incident which took place on June 7, 2007, when 376 ethnic Tamils living in Colombo, Sri Lanka were deported from the city by the Sri Lankan Police. The evicted were sent back to Jaffna, Vavuniya, Trincomalee and Batticaloa, where they were originally from, in several buses with a police escort. However, the buses only went as far as the town of Vavuniya and the evicted Tamils were forced to stay in a detention camp. The President asked those who were evicted to come back to Colombo and ordered an investigation into the incident

== Background to the Expulsion ==
The Tamil militant Liberation Tigers of Tamil Eelam organization (LTTE) had carried out numerous bombings in Colombo, the capital of Sri Lanka, over the course of the Sri Lankan civil war. It was compulsory for ethnic Tamils traveling from the Northern Province and Eastern Province to register with the Police and mandatorily carry a police certificate as per the Prevention of Terrorism Act and emergency regulations and if found not living in the residence in the certificate, they could be arrested.

The breakdown of the Norwegian-backed peace process saw an increase in IED explosions and suicide bombings, attributed by the Sri Lanka Police to the LTTE in Colombo. In May 2007, at least three such explosions took place in the city, including an attack on a military vehicle that killed seven civilians and one police officer. Police investigations identified that those responsible for a number of these bombings had temporarily lived in and planned their attacks from low budget lodges in the city. The Sri Lanka Police said that, for instance, there were occasions where some individuals had lived in these lodges for over six months on the pretext that they had come to obtain their passports, which could be obtained in as little as one day.

Therefore, the Sri Lanka Police said:

"Temporary occupants who cannot provide valid reasons for their stay in the Colombo area will be sent back to their homes"

Keheliya Rambukwella, government minister and spokesperson for the Ministry of Defence acknowledged:

"Tamils were singled out for scrutiny in Colombo, but only because rebel attackers -- who have killed members of all ethnic groups -- routinely hid among the capital's large Tamil community"

== Expulsion ==
On the morning of June 7, heavily armed Sri Lanka Police officers entered low-budget hostels in the Wellawatte, Dehiwala, Kotahena, Pettah and Wattala areas of Colombo and asked 376 persons, comprising 291 males and 85 females, who did not have valid reasons for being in Colombo to leave. They were then put into buses and were sent away from Colombo to destinations in the east and north of Sri Lanka. People were taken to the town of Vavuniya and made to stay in a detention camp. On the next day they were handed over to Government officials of Vavuniya.

== Concern ==
The move to expel these people drew wide criticism of the government. The United States Embassy in Sri Lanka condemned the act, asking the government of Sri Lanka to ensure the constitutional rights of all the citizens of the country. Norway also condemned the act, describing it as a clear violation of international human rights law. Their press release urged government of Sri Lanka to desist from any further enforced removals. Canada has also condemned the action. The expulsion was also condemned in the Sri Lankan media. Eight human rights groups wrote a joint letter to the President claiming that act was "a flagrant violation of (freedom of movement) and a disgrace to humanity".

Allegation of Ethnic cleansing

Human rights groups, Local think tank and other observers have termed this act as "ethnic cleansing". The media group said that this type of act reminds people of what "Hitler did to the Jews", and the Asian Center of Human Rights urged India to intervene.

== Eyewitness Accounts ==
One of the men who was forced to leave Colombo managed to call a local radio station, Sirisa FM from a mobile phone. He said;

"The police came and took us and put everyone on the bus... We don't know where we are being taken".

A 64-year-old woman from Jaffna, who was among those evicted said that;

"We were asked to go back to our villages, but the government dropped us off at a detention camp in Vavuniya"

Another 54-year-old woman was quoted as saying;

"Police didn't listen to us, they tried to beat us, they were scolding and they put us in to the vehicles, they didn't even allow us to drink tea. When we saw people being caged in white van and taken away, we got scared and were hiding, even there they found us. "

== Aftermath ==
The Sri Lankan Supreme Court on June 8, 2007, issued an injunction on the Sri Lanka Police to stop the evacuation of residents of Colombo lodges after hearing a fundamental rights petition filed by a non governmental organization, the Center for Policy Alternatives, Sri Lanka (CPA). As a result of the ruling, police boarded 185 out of the 270 people who were sent to Vavuniya onto five buses and took them back to Colombo.

President Mahinda Rajapaksa reprimanded his police chief for the deportations and ordered the Inspector General of the Police to present a report on the manner of transportation of the Tamils and on the alleged exceeding of authority by the officials involved. He has also invited the people who were sent to Vavuniya to return to Colombo.

== Government reaction ==
On June 10, 2007, Sri Lankan Prime Minister Ratnasiri Wickremanayake told reporters that the government regretted the eviction of 376 Tamils from Colombo and that he accepted responsibility of the incident. He promised that this kind of incident would not recur.

Two days later Defence Secretary Gotabaya Rajapaksa defended the move, saying

"Everyone knows the LTTE is infiltrating (Colombo). We can't arrest 300 people and detain them. What is the best option? You can tell them: "You don't have any legal business in Colombo and there is a security problem in Colombo. We don't want to detain you. You go back to your homes"

"We have to defend ourselves. You can't risk the country. It's not against a community. I'm talking about terrorists. Anything is fair. When America is attacked every country calls it war against terrorism, but why are the terrorists being treated in a different way in Sri Lanka?"

== See also ==
- Expulsion of Muslims from Jaffna
