= Gowhargan-e Sofla =

Gowhargan-e Sofla گوهرگان سفلي
- Village
- Location within Iran
- Coordinates: 30°27′04″N 51°11′19″E
- Country: Iran
- Province: Kohgiluyeh and Boyer-Ahmad
- County: Basht
- Bakhsh: Basht
- Rural District: Babuyi

Population (2006)
  - Total: 57
- Time zone: UTC+3:30 (IRST)
  - Summer (DST): UTC+4:30 (IRDT)

Gowhargan-e Sofla (Persian: گوهرگان سفلي, also Romanized as Gowhargān-e Soflá; also known as Dālān-e Gowhargān and Gowhargān-e Pā’īn) is a village in Babuyi Rural District, Basht District, Basht County, Kohgiluyeh and Boyer-Ahmad Province, Iran. At the 2006 census, its population was 57, in 19 families.
