= Suleh, Kurdistan =

Suleh سوله
- Village
- Location within Iran
- Coordinates: 35°53′01″N 46°29′51″E
- Country: Iran
- Province: Kurdistan
- County: Saqqez
- Bakhsh: Ziviyeh
- Rural District: Khvor Khvoreh

Population (2006)
  - Total: 108
- Time zone: UTC+3:30 (IRST)
  - Summer (DST): UTC+4:30 (IRDT)

Suleh (Persian: سوله, also Romanized as Sūleh, Sooleh, and Sowleh; also known as Soleh and Sūlelh) is a village in Khvor Khvoreh Rural District, Ziviyeh District, Saqqez County, Kurdistan Province, Iran. At the 2006 census, the village had 108 residents, in 19 families. The village is populated by Kurds.
