= Nesareh-ye Kuchek =

Nesareh-ye Kuchek نثاره كوچك
- Village
- Location within Iran
- Coordinates: 30°53′50″N 48°25′42″E
- Country: Iran
- Province: Khuzestan
- County: Shadegan
- Bakhsh: Central
- Rural District: Darkhoveyn

Population (2006)
  - Total: 204
- Time zone: UTC+3:30 (IRST)
  - Summer (DST): UTC+4:30 (IRDT)

Nesareh-ye Kuchek (Persian: نثاره كوچك, also Romanized as Nes̄āreh-ye Kūchek; also known as Nathārah, Nesāreh, Nes̄ār-e Kūchek, and Nos̄āreh) is a village in Darkhoveyn Rural District, in the Central District of Shadegan County, Khuzestan Province, Iran. At the 2006 census, its population was 204, in 43 families.
