= Aqajeri, East Azerbaijan =

Aqajeri اقاجري
- Village
- Location within Iran
- Coordinates: 37°26′16″N 46°25′12″E
- Country: Iran
- Province: East Azerbaijan
- County: Maragheh
- Bakhsh: Central
- Rural District: Sarajuy-ye Shomali

Population (2006)
  - Total: 520
- Time zone: UTC+3:30 (IRST)
  - Summer (DST): UTC+4:30 (IRDT)

Aqajeri (Persian: اقاجري, also Romanized as Āqājerī; also known as Āghājerī) is a village in Sarajuy-ye Shomali Rural District, in the Central District of Maragheh County, East Azerbaijan Province, Iran. At the 2006 census, its population was 520, in 118 families.
