= Nesareh-ye Bozorg =

Village in Khuzestan, Iran

Nesareh-ye Bozorg نثاره بزرگ
- Village
- Location within Iran
- Coordinates: 30°54′32″N 48°23′58″E
- Country: Iran
- Province: Khuzestan
- County: Shadegan
- Bakhsh: Central
- Rural District: Darkhoveyn

Population (2006)
  - Total: 394
- Time zone: UTC+3:30 (IRST)
  - Summer (DST): UTC+4:30 (IRDT)

Nesareh-ye Bozorg (Persian: نثاره بزرگ, also Romanized as Nes̄āreh-ye Bozorg; also known as Nathārah, Nes̄ār-e Bozorg, Nes̄āreh-ye Borzog, Noşāreh, and Nos̄s̄āreh) is a village in Darkhoveyn Rural District, in the Central District of Shadegan County, Khuzestan Province, Iran. At the 2006 census, its population was 394, in 82 families.
