= Divandarreh =

City in Kurdistan province, Iran

Divandarreh Persian: ديواندره
- City
- Location within Iran Location within Iran Kurdistan
- Coordinates: 35°54′57″N 47°01′22″E
- Country: Iran
- Province: Kurdistan
- County: Divandarreh
- District: Central

Population (2016)
  - Total: 34,007
- Time zone: UTC+3:30 (IRST)

Divandarreh (Persian: ديواندره) (Note: Also romanized as Dīvān Darreh, Dīvāndarreh, and Dīwān Darreh; also known as Dīvan Darra, Divândare and Dîwandere; Kurdish: دیواندەرە) is a city in the Central District of Divandarreh County, Kurdistan province, Iran, serving as capital of both the county and the district.

The city is surrounded by the Chehelcheshme, Havazu, and Saral plains on one side, and the Bijar, Garos, and Tilako regions on the other.

The Karaftu Cave, located 70 kilometers northwest of Divandareh County, is an excellent example of the civilization of the Kurdish ancestors in this region. The cave indicates the existence of an ancient civilization in the Divandareh region dating back to 2000 BC.

Divandareh is one of the most important wheat-producing centers in Kurdistan and Iran. It is also one of the traditional centers of livestock and meat production in western Iran.

The inhabitants of the city speak Central Kurdish dialect, specifically the Ardalani dialect, while Persian is used as the language of education and official written communication.

== Etymology ==
The name Divandarre is derived from two words: “Divan” and “Darre” meaning a place associated with law and justice. For this reason, it became known as “Divankhane“.

== Geography ==
The city of Divandare, situated at an elevation of 1,850 meters above sea level, is located in a mountainous and partially forested area, 66 kilometers north of Sanandaj. The city lies between 35°52′ and 36° north latitude and 46°58′ and 47°06′ east longitude, measured from the Greenwich meridian.

Regarding its internal administrative boundaries, Divandarre County borders Takab county in West Azerbaijan to the north, Bijar county to the east, Sanandaj county to the south, Saqqez county to the west, and the Sershiw District of Marivan county to the southwest.

=== Rivers ===
There are many rivers in the county, most of which are seasonal and originate from snowmelt and seasonal precipitation. The region has two major permanent rivers: the Qizil Ozan and the Yul kheshti .

The Qizil Ozan River originates in the highlands of Chehelcheshme and Saral and eventually flows into the Caspian Sea under the name Sefid Rud.

The Yul Kashti River also originates in the watershed of the Obato Plateau and joins the Qizil Ozan River after flowing through a valley.

=== Climate ===
According to geographical classifications, Divandarreh County is considered a mountainous region. The presence of mountains such as Hawazu and Tale Sawar near the city, along with the high peaks of the Chehelcheshme mountain range within the county, results in cold winters mild summers, and rainy, pleasant springs.

== History ==
Since the Safavid era Divandarre has influenced by two major cities in Kurdistan province. Sanandaj to the south and Saqqez to the north.

With the development of the Sanandaj-Saqqez road, the village of Divandarre, located midway along this route gradually expanded into population center and transportation hub. By the early 1950s, it had emerged as a small town. Therefore, the main factor behind the establishment and development of Divandarre as a town was its strategic location at crossroads.

== Demographics ==
=== Ethnicity ===
The city is populated by Kurds.

=== Population ===
At the time of the 2006 National Census, the city's population was 22,842 in 5,305 households. The following census in 2011 counted 26,654 people in 6,743 households. The 2016 census measured the population of the city as 34,007 people in 9,497 households.
