= Kileh Shin =

Kileh Shin Persian: کیله‌شین Sorani Kurdish: کێلەشین
- Village
- Location within Iran
- Coordinates: 36°05′58″N 46°00′35″E
- Country: Iran
- Province: Kurdistan
- County: Saqqez
- Bakhsh: Central
- Rural District: Mir Deh

Population (2006)
  - Total: 517
- Time zone: UTC+3:30 (IRST)
  - Summer (DST): UTC+4:30 (IRDT)

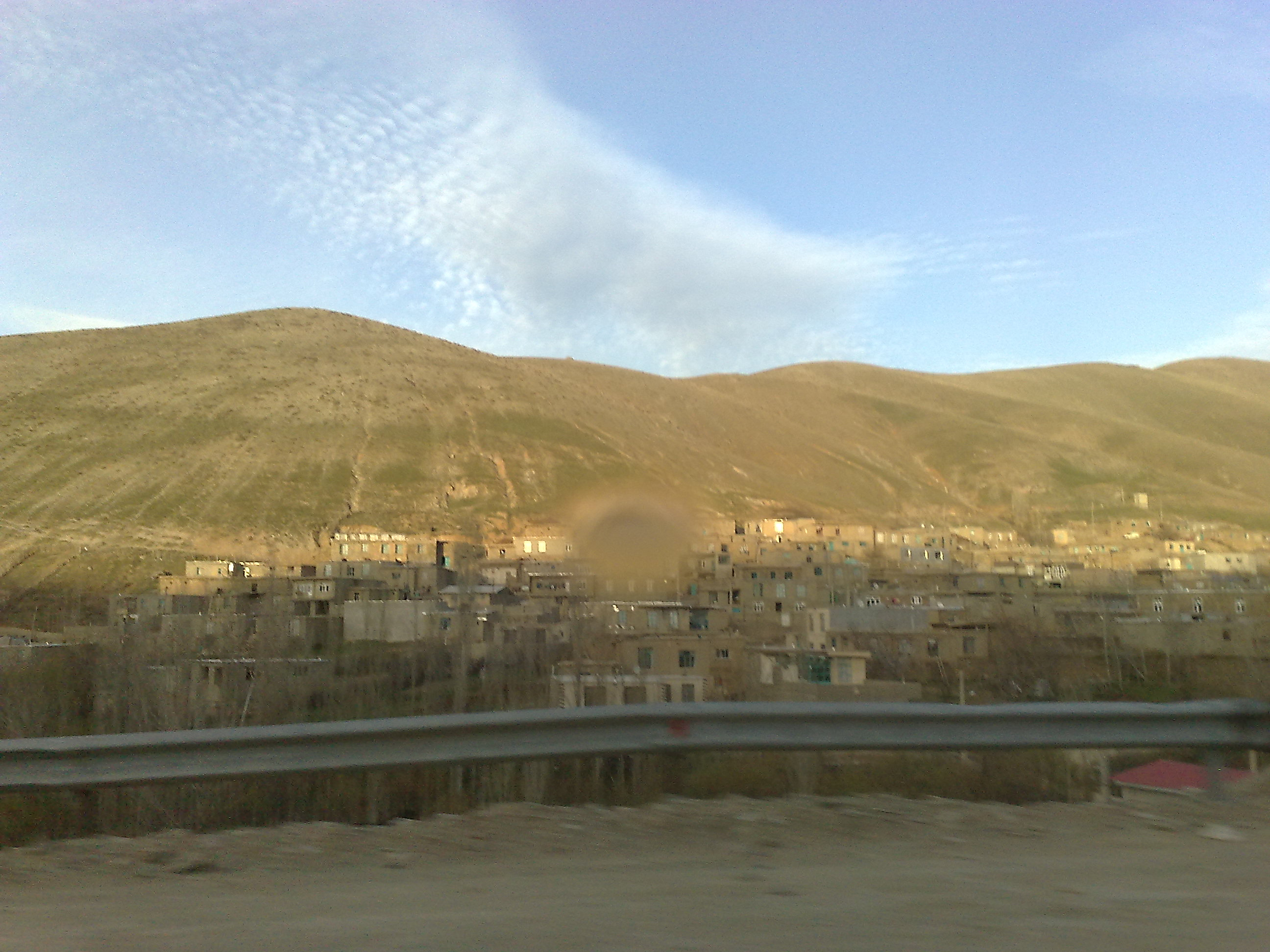

Kileh Shin (Persian: کیله‌شین, Sorani Kurdish: کێلەشین, Kurdish: Kêleşîn, also Romanized as Kīleh Shīn) is a village in Mir Deh Rural District, in the Central District of Saqqez County, Kurdistan Province, Iran. At the 2006 census, its population was 517, in 100 families. The village is populated by Kurds.
