= Eshaqabad, Kurdistan =

Eshaqabad اسحاق آباد
- Village
- Location within Iran
- Coordinates: 35°51′50″N 46°27′41″E
- Country: Iran
- Province: Kurdistan
- County: Saqqez
- Bakhsh: Sarshiv
- Rural District: Chehel Cheshmeh-ye Gharbi

Population (2006)
  - Total: 358
- Time zone: UTC+3:30 (IRST)
  - Summer (DST): UTC+4:30 (IRDT)

Eshaqabad (Persian: اسحاق آباد, also Romanized as Esḩāqābād and Esḩaqābād; also known as Eslḩāqābād and Ishāqābād) is a village in Chehel Cheshmeh-ye Gharbi Rural District, Sarshiv District, Saqqez County, Kurdistan Province, Iran. At the 2006 census, the village population was 358, in 66 families. The village is populated by Kurds.
