= Howmeh Rural District (Divandarreh County) =

Rural district in Kurdistan province, Iran

Howmeh Rural District Persian: دهستان حومه
- Rural District
- Location within Iran Location within Iran Kurdistan
- Coordinates: 35°53′35″N 47°06′17″E
- Country: Iran
- Province: Kurdistan
- County: Divandarreh
- District: Central
- Capital: Nesareh-ye Olya

Population (2016)
  - Total: 7,618
- Time zone: UTC+3:30 (IRST)

Howmeh Rural District (Persian: دهستان حومه) is in the Central District of Divandarreh County, Kurdistan province, Iran. Its capital is the village of Nesareh-ye Olya.

== Demographics ==
=== Population ===
At the time of the 2006 National Census, the rural district's population was 7,856 in 1,624 households. There were 8,401 inhabitants in 1,946 households at the following census of 2011. The 2016 census measured the population of the rural district as 7,618 in 1,989 households. The most populous of its 25 villages was Nesareh-ye Olya, with 1,812 people.
