= Qaratureh Rural District =

Rural district in Kurdistan province, Iran

Qaratureh Rural District Persian: دهستان قراتوره
- Rural District
- Location within Iran Location within Iran Kurdistan
- Coordinates: 36°04′03″N 47°14′33″E
- Country: Iran
- Province: Kurdistan
- County: Divandarreh
- District: Central
- Capital: Gavshaleh

Population (2016)
  - Total: 7,044
- Time zone: UTC+3:30 (IRST)

Qaratureh Rural District (Persian: دهستان قراتوره) is in the Central District of Divandarreh County, Kurdistan province, Iran. Its capital is the village of Gavshaleh.

== Demographics ==
=== Population ===
At the time of the 2006 National Census, the rural district's population was 9,368 in 1,888 households. There were 7,710 inhabitants in 1,855 households at the following census of 2011. The 2016 census measured the population of the rural district as 7,044 in 1,827 households. The most populous of its 28 villages was Vezman, with 1,007 people.
