= Chehel Cheshmeh Rural District =

Rural district in Kurdistan province, Iran

Chehel Cheshmeh Rural District Persian: دهستان چهل چشمه
- Rural District
- Location within Iran Location within Iran Kurdistan
- Coordinates: 35°51′31″N 46°43′26″E
- Country: Iran
- Province: Kurdistan
- County: Divandarreh
- District: Central
- Capital: Sharifabad

Population (2016)
  - Total: 5,875
- Time zone: UTC+3:30 (IRST)

Chehel Cheshmeh Rural District (Persian: دهستان چهل چشمه) is in the Central District of Divandarreh County, Kurdistan province, Iran. Its capital is the village of Sharifabad.

== Demographics ==
=== Population ===
At the time of the 2006 National Census, the rural district's population was 7,156 in 1,388 households. There were 6,517 inhabitants in 1,496 households at the following census of 2011. The 2016 census measured the population of the rural district as 5,875 in 1,439 households. The most populous of its 22 villages was Ebrahimabad, with 1,062 people.
