= Central District (Divandarreh County) =

District in Kurdistan province, Iran

Central District (Divandarreh County) Persian: بخش مرکزی شهرستان دیواندره
- District
- Location within Iran Location within Iran Kurdistan
- Coordinates: 35°55′56″N 46°59′18″E
- Country: Iran
- Province: Kurdistan
- County: Divandarreh
- Capital: Divandarreh

Population (2016)
  - Total: 54,544
- Time zone: UTC+3:30 (IRST)

The Central District of Divandarreh County (Persian: بخش مرکزی شهرستان دیواندره) is in Kurdistan province, Iran. Its capital is the city of Divandarreh.

== Demographics ==
=== Population ===
At the time of the 2006 National Census, the district's population was 47,222 in 10,205 households. The following census in 2011 counted 49,282 people in 12,040 households. The 2016 census measured the population of the district as 54,544 inhabitants in 14,752 households.

=== Administrative divisions ===
Central District (Divandarreh County) Population
Administrative Divisions	2006	2011	2016
Chehel Cheshmeh RD	7,156	6,517	5,875
Howmeh RD	7,856	8,401	7,618
Qaratureh RD	9,368	7,710	7,044
Divandarreh (city)	22,842	26,654	34,007
Total	47,222	49,282	54,544
RD = Rural District
