= Divandarreh County =

County in Kurdistan province, Iran

Divandarreh County Persian: شهرستان دیواندره
- County
- Location of Divandarreh County in Kurdistan province

- Location of Kurdistan province in Iran
- Coordinates: 35°58′N 46°58′E
- Country: Iran
- Province: Kurdistan
- Capital: Divandarreh
- Districts: Central, Karaftu, Saral

Population (2016)
  - Total: 80,040
- Time zone: UTC+3:30 (IRST)

Divandarreh County (Persian: شهرستان دیواندره) is in Kurdistan province, Iran. Its capital is the city of Divandarreh.

== History ==
After the 2011 National Census, Hoseynabad-e Shomali Rural District was separated from the county to join Sanandaj County. After the 2016 census, the village of Hezar Kanian was elevated to the status of a city.

== Demographics ==
=== Population ===
At the time of the 2006 census, the county's population was 82,628 in 17,335 households. The following census in 2011 counted 81,963 people in 19,843 households. The 2016 census measured the population of the county as 80,040 in 21,216 households.

=== Administrative divisions ===
Divandarreh County's population history and administrative structure over three consecutive censuses are shown in the following table.

Divandarreh County Population
Administrative Divisions	2006	2011	2016
Central District	47,222	49,282	54,544
Chehel Cheshmeh RD	7,156	6,517	5,875
Howmeh RD	7,856	8,401	7,618
Qaratureh RD	9,368	7,710	7,044
Divandarreh (city)	22,842	26,654	34,007
Karaftu District	18,938	17,404	15,611
Kani Shirin RD	5,477	4,448	3,691
Obatu RD	5,113	4,270	3,782
Zarrineh RD	7,076	6,832	6,047
Zarrineh (city)	1,272	1,854	2,091
Saral District	16,468	15,277	9,884
Hoseynabad-e Shomali RD (Note: Transferred to Sanandaj County)	3,603	3,475	
Kowleh RD	5,996	5,396	4,371
Saral RD	6,869	6,406	5,513
Hezar Kanian (city) (Note: Became a city after the 2016 census)			
Total	82,628	81,963	80,040
RD = Rural District

== See also ==
Media related to Divandarreh County at Wikimedia Commons
