= Sivi =

Sivi may refer to:

- SIVI, an Italian truck modification company
- Sivi (film), 2007 Indian Tamil horror film
  - Sivi 2, its 2022 sequel
- Sivi Kingdom, a kingdom mentioned in the ancient Indian epic Mahabharata

== See also ==
- Shibi (disambiguation)
- Shivi, Iran (disambiguation)
- Sibi (disambiguation)
