= Siby (name) =

Siby and Sibi are names found independently in several cultures (Africa, Europe and South Asia). Notable people with the name include:

== Given name ==
- Sibi (king), a character in Hindu and Buddhist mythology
- Aliou Siby Badra (born 1971), Ivorian footballer
- Sibi Gwar (born 1987), Nigerian football player
- Sibi Malayil (born 1956), Indian film director
- Sibi Raj, Indian actor
- Siby K. Thomas, Indian screenwriter
- Siby Varghese or Kailash, Indian film actor
- Sibi, a violinist in the 2010 Burkinabé documentary Sibi, l’âme du violon

== Surname ==
- Fanta Siby (born 1962), Malinese doctor and politician
- Félix Siby (1942–2006), Gabonese politician
- John Sibi-Okumu, Kenyan actor and journalist
- Mahamé Siby (born 1996), French footballer

== See also ==
- Sibby, a given name (including a list of people with the name)
- Sibi (disambiguation)
- Siby (disambiguation)
