= Sunj =

Sunj or Sunaj or Sevenj (Persian: سونج) may refer to:

- Sevenj, Fars
- Sunj, Baneh, Kurdistan Province
- Sunj-e Olya, Baneh County, Kurdistan Province
- Sunaj, Saqqez, Kurdistan Province
