= Sad Bar =

Sad Bar صدبار
- Village
- Location within Iran
- Coordinates: 36°05′43″N 45°51′13″E
- Country: Iran
- Province: Kurdistan
- County: Baneh
- Bakhsh: Central
- Rural District: Shuy

Population (2006)
  - Total: 500
- Time zone: UTC+3:30 (IRST)
  - Summer (DST): UTC+4:30 (IRDT)

Sad Bar (Persian: صدبار, also Romanized as Şad Bār; also known as Sadbād) is a village in Shuy Rural District, in the Central District of Baneh County, Kurdistan Province, Iran. At the 2006 census, its population was 500, in 92 families. The village is populated by Kurds.
