= Kupich =

Kupich كوپيچ
- Village
- Location within Iran
- Coordinates: 36°00′50″N 45°50′46″E
- Country: Iran
- Province: Kurdistan
- County: Baneh
- Bakhsh: Central
- Rural District: Shuy

Population (2006)
  - Total: 49
- Time zone: UTC+3:30 (IRST)
  - Summer (DST): UTC+4:30 (IRDT)

Kupich (Persian: كوپيچ, also Romanized as Kūpīch; also known as Kūpīch-e Ḩājjī) is a village in Shuy Rural District, in the Central District of Baneh County, Kurdistan Province, Iran. At the 2006 census, its population was 49, in 10 families. The village is populated by Kurds.
