= Nezhu =

Nezhu نژو
- Village
- Location within Iran
- Coordinates: 36°04′49″N 45°50′57″E
- Country: Iran
- Province: Kurdistan
- County: Baneh
- Bakhsh: Central
- Rural District: Shuy

Population (2006)
  - Total: 272
- Time zone: UTC+3:30 (IRST)
  - Summer (DST): UTC+4:30 (IRDT)

Nezhu (Persian: نژو,Sorani Kurdish: نژۆ also Romanized as Nezhū and Nezhow) is a village in Shuy Rural District, in the Central District of Baneh County, Kurdistan Province, Iran. At the 2006 census, its population was 272, in 52 families. The village is populated by Kurds.
