= Balveh =

Balveh بلوه
- Village
- Location within Iran
- Coordinates: 36°00′51″N 45°57′43″E
- Country: Iran
- Province: Kurdistan
- County: Baneh
- Bakhsh: Central
- Rural District: Shuy

Population (2006)
  - Total: 28
- Time zone: UTC+3:30 (IRST)
  - Summer (DST): UTC+4:30 (IRDT)

Balveh (Persian: بلوه) is a village in Shuy Rural District, in the Central District of Baneh County, Kurdistan Province, Iran. At the 2006 census, its population was 28, in 7 families. The village is populated by Kurds.
