= Sichan =

Sichan (Persian: سيچان) may refer to:

- Sichan, Kurdistan
- Sichan, Markazi
- Sichan, South Khorasan
