= Daruleh =

Daruleh دروله
- Village
- Location within Iran
- Coordinates: 36°02′02″N 45°56′04″E
- Country: Iran
- Province: Kurdistan
- County: Baneh
- Bakhsh: Central
- Rural District: Shuy

Population (2006)
  - Total: 65
- Time zone: UTC+3:30 (IRST)
  - Summer (DST): UTC+4:30 (IRDT)

Daruleh (Persian: دروله, also Romanized as Darūleh) is a village in Shuy Rural District, in the Central District of Baneh County, Kurdistan Province, Iran. At the 2006 census, its population was 65, in 14 families. The village is populated by Kurds.
