= Boneh Khvoy =

Boneh Khvoy بنه خوي
- Village
- Location within Iran
- Coordinates: 36°01′18″N 45°58′27″E
- Country: Iran
- Province: Kurdistan
- County: Baneh
- Bakhsh: Central
- Rural District: Shuy

Population (2006)
  - Total: 308
- Time zone: UTC+3:30 (IRST)
  - Summer (DST): UTC+4:30 (IRDT)

Boneh Khvoy (Persian: بنه خوي; also known as Binakve) is a village in Shuy Rural District, in the Central District of Baneh County, Kurdistan Province, Iran. At the 2006 census, its population was 308, in 67 families. The village is populated by Kurds.
