= Kani Now =

Kani Now كاني ناو
- Village
- Location within Iran
- Coordinates: 36°00′00″N 45°58′34″E
- Country: Iran
- Province: Kurdistan
- County: Baneh
- Bakhsh: Central
- Rural District: Shuy

Population (2006)
  - Total: 337
- Time zone: UTC+3:30 (IRST)
  - Summer (DST): UTC+4:30 (IRDT)

Kani Now (Persian: كاني ناو, also Romanized as Kānī Now; also known as Kānī Nāv) is a village in Shuy Rural District, in the Central District of Baneh County, Kurdistan Province, Iran. At the 2006 census, its population was 337, in 60 families. The village is populated by Kurds.
