= Shargeh =

Shargeh or Sharegeh (Persian: شرگه) may refer to:

- Shargeh, Baneh
- Sharegeh, Marivan
