= Saviru =

Saviru سويرو
- Village
- Location within Iran
- Coordinates: 36°01′09″N 45°49′00″E
- Country: Iran
- Province: Kurdistan
- County: Baneh
- Bakhsh: Central
- Rural District: Shuy

Population (2006)
  - Total: 300
- Time zone: UTC+3:30 (IRST)
  - Summer (DST): UTC+4:30 (IRDT)

Saviru (Persian: سويرو, also Romanized as Savīrū) is a village in Shuy Rural District, in the Central District of Baneh County, Kurdistan Province, Iran. At the 2006 census, its population was 300, in 61 families. The village is populated by Kurds.
