= Rashid Qaleh =

Village in Kurdistan province, Iran

Rashid Qaleh Persian: رشيدقلعه
- Village
- Location within Iran Location within Iran Kurdistan
- Coordinates: 36°01′26″N 45°54′40″E
- Country: Iran
- Province: Kurdistan
- County: Baneh
- District: Central
- Rural District: Shuy

Population (2016)
  - Total: 737
- Time zone: UTC+3:30 (IRST)

Rashid Qaleh (Persian: رشيدقلعه) (Note: Also romanized as Rashīd Qal‘eh) is a village in Shuy Rural District of the Central District in Baneh County, Kurdistan province, Iran.

== Demographics ==
=== Ethnicity ===
The village is populated by Kurds.

=== Population ===
At the time of the 2006 National Census, the village's population was 378 in 77 households. The following census in 2011 counted 745 people in 146 households. The 2016 census measured the population of the village as 737 people in 158 households.
