= Sabadlu =

Village in Kurdistan province, Iran

Sabadlu Persian: سبدلو
- Village
- Location within Iran Location within Iran Kurdistan
- Coordinates: 36°01′55″N 45°57′04″E
- Country: Iran
- Province: Kurdistan
- County: Baneh
- District: Central
- Rural District: Shuy

Population (2016)
  - Total: 1,620
- Time zone: UTC+3:30 (IRST)

Sabadlu (Persian: سبدلو) (Note: Also romanized as Sabadlū; also known as Sabadly) is a village in Shuy Rural District of the Central District in Baneh County, Kurdistan province, Iran.

== Demographics ==
=== Ethnicity ===
The village is populated by Kurds.

=== Population ===
At the time of the 2006 National Census, the village's population was 896 in 209 households. The following census in 2011 counted 1,330 people in 339 households. The 2016 census measured the population of the village as 1,620 people in 432 households, the most populous in its rural district.
