= Kupich-e Sofla =

Village in Kurdistan province, Iran

Kupich-e Sofla Persian: كوپيچ سفلي
- Village
- Location within Iran Location within Iran Kurdistan
- Coordinates: 36°01′01″N 45°50′41″E
- Country: Iran
- Province: Kurdistan
- County: Baneh
- District: Central
- Rural District: Shuy

Population (2016)
  - Total: 740
- Time zone: UTC+3:30 (IRST)

Kupich-e Sofla (Persian: كوپيچ سفلي) (Note: Also romanized as Kūpīch-e Soflá) is a village in Shuy Rural District of the Central District in Baneh County, Kurdistan province, Iran.

== Demographics ==
=== Ethnicity ===
The village is populated by Kurds.

=== Population ===
At the time of the 2006 National Census, the village's population was 292 in 69 households. The following census in 2011 counted 792 people in 170 households. The 2016 census measured the population of the village as 740 people in 199 households.
