= Shargeh, Baneh =

Village in Kurdistan, Iran

Shargeh شرگه
- Village
- Location within Iran
- Coordinates: 36°03′18″N 45°49′00″E
- Country: Iran
- Province: Kurdistan
- County: Baneh
- Bakhsh: Central
- Rural District: Shuy

Population (2006)
  - Total: 77
- Time zone: UTC+3:30 (IRST)
  - Summer (DST): UTC+4:30 (IRDT)

Shargeh (Persian: شرگه) is a village in Shuy Rural District, in the Central District of Baneh County, Kurdistan Province, Iran. According to the 2006 census its population was 77, from 14 families. The village is populated by Kurds.
