= Tarkhanabad, Baneh =

Village in Kurdistan province, Iran

Tarkhanabad Persian: ترخان آباد
- Village
- Location within Iran Location within Iran Kurdistan
- Coordinates: 35°59′34″N 45°55′17″E
- Country: Iran
- Province: Kurdistan
- County: Baneh
- District: Central
- Rural District: Shuy

Population (2016)
  - Total: 557
- Time zone: UTC+3:30 (IRST)

Tarkhanabad (Persian: ترخان آباد) (Note: Also romanized as Tarkhānābād) is a village in Shuy Rural District of the Central District in Baneh County, Kurdistan province, Iran.

== Demographics ==
=== Ethnicity ===
The village is populated by Kurds.

=== Population ===
At the time of the 2006 National Census, the village's population was 153 in 36 households. The following census in 2011 counted 469 people in 126 households. The 2016 census measured the population of the village as 557 people in 154 households.
