= Sunj, Baneh =

Sunj سونج
- Village
- Location within Iran
- Coordinates: 36°02′18″N 45°58′32″E
- Country: Iran
- Province: Kurdistan
- County: Baneh
- Bakhsh: Central
- Rural District: Shuy

Population (2006)
  - Total: 145
- Time zone: UTC+3:30 (IRST)
  - Summer (DST): UTC+4:30 (IRDT)

Sunj (Persian: سونج, also Romanized as Sūnj; also known as Sūnj-e Soflá) is a village in Shuy Rural District, in the Central District of Baneh County, Kurdistan Province, Iran. At the 2006 census, its population was 145, in 26 families. The village is populated by Kurds.
