= Star trucks =

Star trucks can mean either:

- FSC Star, a Polish truck manufacturer, or
- Western Star Trucks, an American heavy truck manufacturer
- Astra Veicoli Industriali, Italian truck manufacturer, a subsidiary of IVECO
