= Civi =

Civi or Çivi may refer to:

- Çivi, Amasya, a village in Amasya Province, Turkey
- Çivi, Mut, a village in Mut district of Mersin Province, Turkey
- CIVI-DT, a Canadian TV station
- Xiaomi Civi, an Android smartphone

== See also ==
- CiviCRM, a software suite
- Sivi (disambiguation)
- CV (disambiguation)
