= Shuy =

Shuy or Shavi or Shevi (Persian: شوي or شاوي), with multiple other romanizations, may refer to:

- Band-e Shuy, village in the Bamyan Province, Afghanistan
- Shavi, Dezful (شوي - Shavī), Khuzestan Province
- Shavi, Shadegan (شاوي - Shāvī), Khuzestan Province
- Shuy, Kurdistan (شوي)
- Shuy, Razavi Khorasan (شوي)
- Shuy Rural District, in Kurdistan Province
- Shevi Waterfall

== See also ==
- Roger Shuy, American linguist
- Shevy (disambiguation)
