= Sar Sunj =

Sar Sunj سرسونج
- Village
- Location within Iran
- Coordinates: 36°02′44″N 45°59′29″E
- Country: Iran
- Province: Kurdistan
- County: Baneh
- Bakhsh: Central
- Rural District: Shuy

Population (2006)
  - Total: 83
- Time zone: UTC+3:30 (IRST)
  - Summer (DST): UTC+4:30 (IRDT)

Sar Sunj (Persian: سرسونج, also Romanized as Sar Sūnj; also known as Sūnj-e ‘Olyā) is a village in Shuy Rural District, in the Central District of Baneh County, Kurdistan Province, Iran. At the 2006 census, its population was 83, in 15 families. The village is populated by Kurds.
