= Ministry of Public Health and Hygiene (Mali) =

Government agency in Mali

The Ministry of Public Health and Hygiene (French: Ministère de la Santé et de l’Hygiène Publique) is the ministry of health of Mali. It has its headquarters in the capital city Bamako.

== History ==
In 2012, the Minister of Health and Public Hygiene was Ousmane Koné, who was succeeded by Marie Madeleine Togo in 2015, Samba Sow in 2017, Michel Hamala Sidibé in 2019, Fanta Siby (Minister of Health and Social Development) in 2021, Diéminatou Sangaré in 2022 and Assa Badiallo Touré in 2023.

== See also ==
- Health in Mali
