= Qai Bard =

Village in Kurdistan province, Iran

Qai Bard Persian: قائي برد
- Village
- Location within Iran Location within Iran Kurdistan
- Coordinates: 35°59′34″N 45°50′41″E
- Country: Iran
- Province: Kurdistan
- County: Baneh
- District: Central
- Rural District: Shuy

Population (2016)
  - Total: 885
- Time zone: UTC+3:30 (IRST)

Qai Bard (Persian: قائي برد) (Note: Also romanized as Qā’ī Bard and Qāybard; also known as Qāẕī Badr) is a village in Shuy Rural District of the Central District in Baneh County, Kurdistan province, Iran.

== Demographics ==
=== Ethnicity ===
The village is populated by Kurds.

=== Population ===
At the time of the 2006 National Census, the village's population was 203 in 41 households. The following census in 2011 counted 371 people in 95 households. The 2016 census measured the population of the village as 885 people in 228 households.
