= Khvajeh Amir =

Khvajeh Amir (Persian: خواجه امير) may refer to:

- Khvajeh Amir, East Azerbaijan
- Khvajeh Amir, Kurdistan
