= HIV/AIDS in Mali =

Infection rates of HIV/AIDS in Mali are estimated to be under 2%, which is relatively low compared to other parts of Africa, although the infection rate is higher among women of childbearing age. However, this figure is most likely deceptive; the problem in attempting to estimate infection rates is that voluntary testing is rare. Women who give birth in a hospital are automatically tested, but others in the general population rarely present themselves for testing. National education campaigns have targeted the general population since the late 1990s, as government and international organizations are concerned that Malians may be vulnerable to the spread of the pandemic. Since 2002, the Supreme National Council for AIDS (HCNLS) has coordinated educational campaigns around sexual activity and condom use to stem HIV infection. Condom use remains low by international standards.

== Prevalence ==
The first cases of HIV/AIDS in Mali were reported in 1985. While the adult HIV prevalence was still relatively low at 1.7% according to the 2001 Demographic and Health Survey (DHS), it was estimated that HIV prevalence in the general population could triple by 2010 if appropriate prevention measures are not taken immediately. There are over 11,000 children living with AIDS in Mali.

Vulnerability to HIV infection in Mali is associated with a variety of factors, including poverty, poor health conditions, certain cultural practices, and low literacy levels. Cultural factors related to HIV vulnerability may include male dominance of women, the early onset of sexual activity among females, and polygamy, while poverty may result in increased prostitution. In addition to polygyny, another cultural factor widely accepted among much of the population is multiple sex partners outside of marriage. Migration is also a significant contributor to HIV infection, as HIV prevalence in neighboring countries such as Côte d'Ivoire and Burkina Faso is substantially higher than in Mali. Political and social troubles in countries like Côte d'Ivoire, Liberia, and Sierra Leone are also believed to contribute to increased HIV transmission across borders.

Recorded rates of HIV infection are higher in Malian women than in men, particularly among pregnant women 25–29 years of age, in whom prevalence is almost 5%. The estimated ratio of HIV-infected young women to young men is 4.5:1. Low condom use and a high prevalence of sexually transmitted disease and sexually transmitted infections (STIs) are important contributing factors for HIV transmission in Mali. Condom use by young males 15–24 years of age is approximately 30%, but among young females it is as low as 14%. Condom use is also low among other vulnerable populations, such as military personnel, truck drivers, and vendors. A recent survey found that only 12% of women vendors in Bamako (with an estimated HIV seroprevalence of 6.7%) reported using a condom with their last non-regular partner. Some people still do not believe that AIDS is real, citing rumors that it is a myth propagated by people in Western/European countries who don't want Africans to have more children.

== National response ==
The commitment of the Government of Mali to HIV/AIDS prevention and treatment is evident. The National AIDS Program was restructured in 2002, creating the Supreme National Council for AIDS (HCNLS), headed by the President of Mali; in 2004, an Executive Secretariat was added to the HCNLS to coordinate multisectoral HIV/AIDS-related programming. The National Strategic Plan for HIV/AIDS Control (2001–2005) was developed, and coordination for a new strategic plan (2005–2009) has begun. In March 2004, the government signed a national declaration of HIV/AIDS policy.

== See also ==
- Health in Mali
- Ebola virus disease in Mali
