= Sichan, Kurdistan =

Sichan سيچان
- Village
- Location within Iran
- Coordinates: 35°59′37″N 45°49′36″E
- Country: Iran
- Province: Kurdistan
- County: Baneh
- Bakhsh: Central
- Rural District: Shuy

Population (2006)
  - Total: 193
- Time zone: UTC+3:30 (IRST)
  - Summer (DST): UTC+4:30 (IRDT)

Sichan (Persian: سيچان, also Romanized as Sīchān) is a village in Shuy Rural District, in the Central District of Baneh County, Kurdistan Province, Iran. At the 2006 census, its population was 193, in 33 families. The village is populated by Kurds.
