= Savan, Kurdistan =

Village in Kurdistan province, Iran

Savan Persian: ساوان
- Village
- Location within Iran Location within Iran Kurdistan
- Coordinates: 36°04′24″N 45°54′16″E
- Country: Iran
- Province: Kurdistan
- County: Baneh
- District: Central
- Rural District: Shuy

Population (2016)
  - Total: 953
- Time zone: UTC+3:30 (IRST)

Savan (Persian: ساوان) (Note: Also romanized as Sāvān) is a village in Shuy Rural District of the Central District in Baneh County, Kurdistan province, Iran.

== Demographics ==
=== Ethnicity ===
The village is populated by Kurds.

=== Population ===
At the time of the 2006 National Census, the village's population was 1,055 in 167 households. The following census in 2011 counted 1,037 people in 210 households. The 2016 census measured the population of the village as 953 people in 220 households.
