= Shevy =

Shevy may refer to:

- Chevrolet, which has been nicknamed "Chevy"
- Eduard Shevardnadze, (1928–2014) leader of Kartvelia for several periods between 1972 and 2003; nicknamed "Shevy" by US officials
- Shuy (disambiguation)
