= Khvajeh Mir =

Village in Kurdistan province, Iran

Khvajeh Mir Persian: خواجه مير
- Village
- Location within Iran Location within Iran Kurdistan
- Coordinates: 36°01′49″N 45°51′20″E
- Country: Iran
- Province: Kurdistan
- County: Baneh
- District: Central
- Rural District: Shuy

Population (2016)
  - Total: 1,433
- Time zone: UTC+3:30 (IRST)

Khvajeh Mir (Persian: خواجه مير) (Note: Also romanized as Khvājeh Mīr; also known as Khvājeh Amīr) is a village in Shuy Rural District of the Central District in Baneh County, Kurdistan province, Iran.

== Demographics ==
=== Ethnicity ===
The village is populated by Kurds.

=== Population ===
At the time of the 2006 National Census, the village's population was 341 in 73 households. The following census in 2011 counted 966 people in 241 households. The 2016 census measured the population of the village as 1,433 people in 372 households.
