= Shuy, Kurdistan =

Village in Kurdistan province, Iran

Shuy Persian: شوي`
- Village
- Location within Iran Location within Iran Kurdistan
- Coordinates: 36°02′50″N 45°51′51″E
- Country: Iran
- Province: Kurdistan
- County: Baneh
- District: Central
- Rural District: Shuy

Population (2016)
  - Total: 1,613
- Time zone: UTC+3:30 (IRST)

Shuy (Persian: شوي) (Note: Also romanized as Shooy, and Shūy; also known as Shovī) is a village in, and the capital of, Shuy Rural District in the Central District of Baneh County, Kurdistan province, Iran.

== Demographics ==
=== Ethnicity ===
The village is populated by Kurds.

=== Population ===
At the time of the 2006 National Census, the village's population was 1,424 in 300 households. The following census in 2011 counted 1,735 people in 411 households. The 2016 census measured the population of the village as 1,613 people in 446 households.
