= Ebola virus disease in Mali =

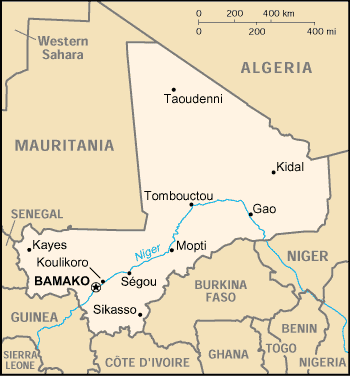
- Map of Mali
- Cases in Mali: 8 (as of 18 January 2015)
- Deaths: 6

Location in Africa, Mali

Ebola virus disease in Mali occurred in October 2014, leading to concern about the possibility of an outbreak of Ebola in Mali. A child was brought from Guinea and died in the northwestern city of Kayes. Mali contact traced over 100 people who had contact with the child; tracing was completed in mid-November with no further cases discovered. In November, a second unrelated outbreak occurred in Mali's capital city, Bamako. Several people at a clinic are thought to have been infected by a man traveling from Guinea. On January 18, Mali was declared Ebola-free after 42 days with no new cases. There had been a cumulative total of eight cases with six deaths.

As of late 2014, the Ebola virus epidemic in Mali's southern neighbors Liberia, Sierra Leone, and Guinea has led to thousands of deaths. Mali, a country of about 16.5 million people, was ranked as one of the top four countries at risk for an outbreak prior to its first reported case.

== Epidemiology ==
=== In Kayes ===
In late October 2014, a two-year-old girl died from Ebola in the city of Kayes. The child, later identified as Fanta Kone, was admitted to hospital on 21 October, where she tested positive for typhoid. Further tests confirmed Ebola. The child, her grandmother, uncle, and five-year-old sister arrived in Bamako after traveling roughly 1000 km (600 miles) from Guinea, where Kone's father had died. They then traveled to Kayes by bus.

Fanta Kone's father, a Red Cross worker, assisted at a private medical clinic in Beyla that was owned and run by his father, Fanta's paternal grandfather. It is suspected that he may have contracted Ebola from a farmer from another village, who sought treatment at the clinic and was accompanied by his two daughters. The farmer died on 12 September, and his daughters on 23 September. After falling ill in late September, Fanta's father traveled to his native village of Sokodougou, 70 kilometres away, where he died on 3 October. By 20 October, the paternal grandfather, his wife, and two sons had also died, with some deaths confirmed to have been from Ebola disease. Fanta's mother and 3-month-old sibling remain disease-free and are residing in Guinea during a 40-day mourning period before joining the rest of her family in Mali.

The hospital pediatrician in Kayes said he was told that the child had been born and raised in Kayes, and that he was not informed of her journey from Guinea. The child's samples were tested at Mali's Center for TB and AIDS Research. Hemorrhagic fevers like Ebola, Marburg virus, and Lassa fever can have similar symptoms, and testing can help determine if a person has a case of one of these diseases. There are about half a million cases of Lassa fever per year in West Africa, causing about 5,000 deaths.

==== Contact tracing ====
There was concern that Kone had exposed others to the virus during her journey because she had been bleeding from her nose. Contact with blood or feces from someone ill with Ebola is a high risk factor for the disease. By 25 October, it was estimated that the child had contact with as many as 300 people, 43 of whom were placed in isolation to prevent the disease from spreading. Of the 43, 10 were health care workers. By 27 October, 111 people had been identified as contacts, but the search was hampered by a lack of health care workers, and 40 volunteers were trained to help with the contact tracing. By 29 October it was thought she had contact with 141 people, however not all of them were found, including 6 of the 10 people on the bus ride with the child from the Guinea border to Bamako.

By 5 November there were no known cases besides the child, although the risk of more cases was still considered to be high. 108 people who had contact with the child were quarantined, although 40 contacts remained missing as of 9 November. Those being watched have their temperature taken twice daily. The Mali Ministry of Health hoped to release these 108 people from monitoring in mid-November, and all contacts successfully completed their 21-day waiting period on 15 November.

=== In Bamako ===
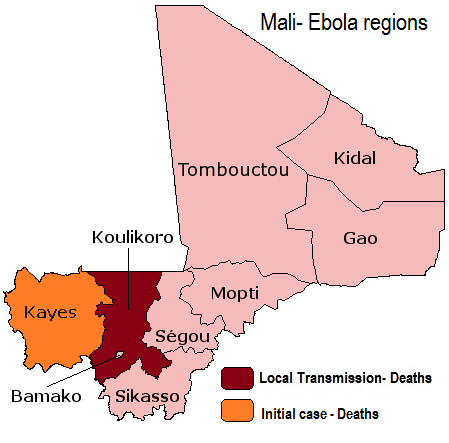
Mali regions with Ebola cases (Kayes, Bamako)

On 12 November, Mali confirmed its second and third deaths from Ebola: an imam from Guinea, and a nurse who was treating him at a clinic in Mali's capital city Bamako. The cases are unrelated to the earlier case in Kayes.

A nurse in Bamako who had treated the imam subsequently fell ill; on 11 November he tested positive for Ebola and died on the same day. A second case was confirmed in a doctor who also worked at the clinic and treated the imam. He developed symptoms on 5 November and died on 20 November.

By 12 November, 90 contacts had been quarantined across the city of Bamako, including about 20 U.N. peacekeepers who were treated at the clinic for injuries sustained while on duty. The government placed both the clinic and the imam's mosque in full lock-down. Contact tracing has been hampered because the imam died two weeks prior to his diagnosis; he was not suspected of having Ebola until the nurse tested positive for the disease. He was buried with full traditional rites, including washing the body, and may have exposed many mourners to the virus.

On 19 November, the WHO updated the status of cases in Mali. The imam was reclassified and not counted in Mali, but considered a Guinea case. The second case in Mali was that of the nurse who treated the imam, and the doctor who treated the imam was the third case. The next three cases were related to the imam as well: a man who had visited the imam while he was in hospital, his wife, and his son. Ebola infection was laboratory-confirmed in the wife and the son. As of 15 November, a total of 407 possible contacts are being traced, according to an official health ministry report. On 18 November, the number of contacts was raised to nearly 600 people that were being monitored.

On Monday 24 November, a government statement raised the number of cases in Mali to eight and six deaths. All the new cases are linked back to the imam. On 4 December, Mali received its first mobile lab, which can be sent to remote hotspots, if needed. On 6 December, U.N. peacekeepers were released from quarantine at the Pasteur Clinic. On December 12, the last case in treatment recovered and was discharged, "so there are no more people sick with Ebola in Mali," according to a Ministry of Health source. On December 16, Mali released the final 13 individuals that were being quarantined, therefore the country will be declared free of the virus on January 18, according to WHO. "There is no more contact-tracing ... and there is no suspected case of Ebola," a spokesperson for WHO indicated.

== Containment efforts ==
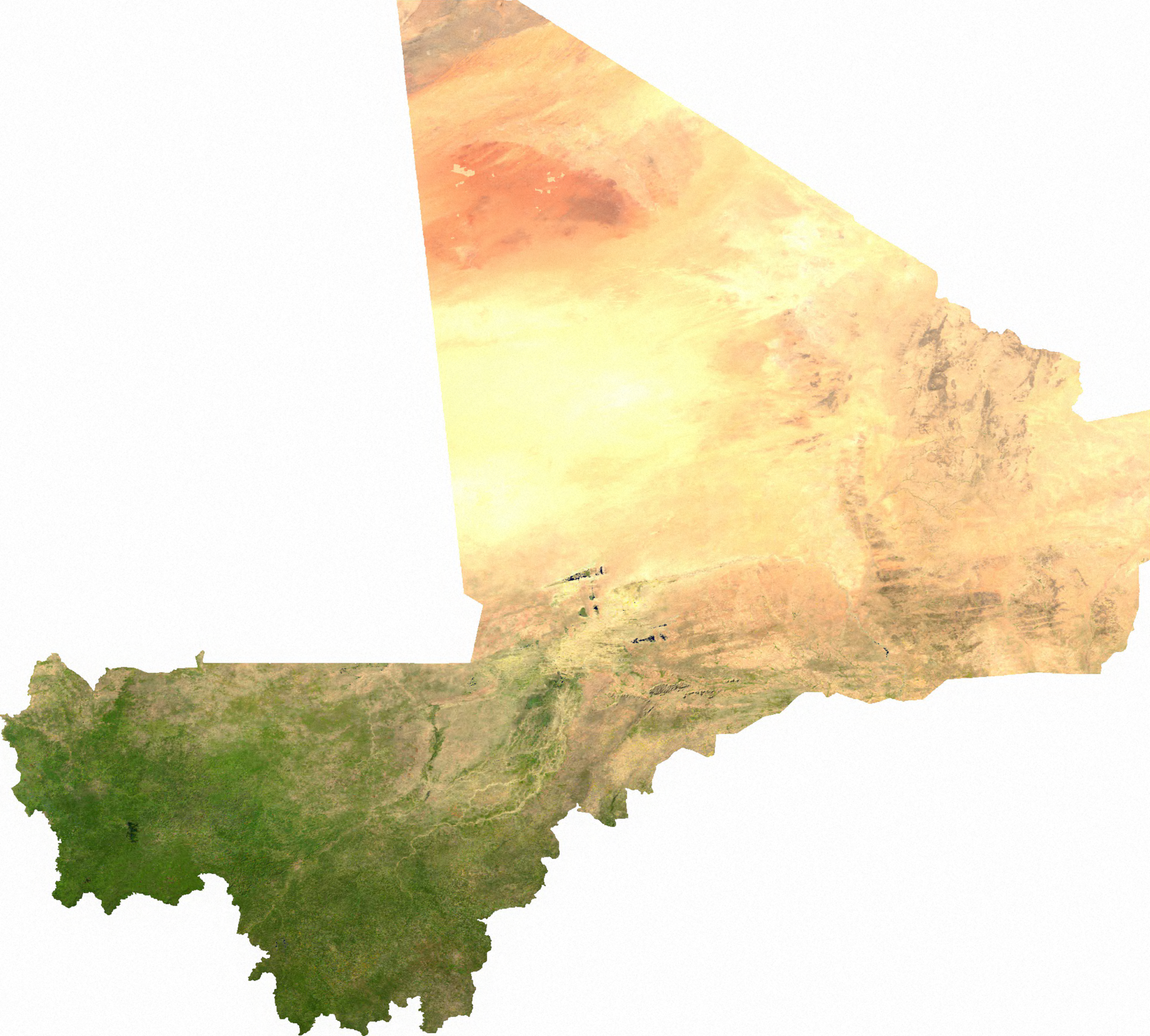
Satellite image of Mali

In October, the Fousseyni Daou Hospital developed an Ebola management plan. The Governor of Kayes closed all the schools in Kayes and urged all residents to strictly observe hygiene recommendations to help stop the spread of disease. The Mali ministry of health has joined with tribal leaders to launch an information campaign. As a result of the efforts to spread Ebola information, concern about the disease has resulted in some changes in traditional practices. Some Malians have begun to change their burial rituals, to greet others by waving rather than shaking hands, and to avoid eating from the same dish, as is typically done throughout Africa.

Earlier in the year, before the disease had broken out in Mali, a biosafety level-3 laboratory was set up in Bamako to prepare for the possibility of an outbreak. Previous to the ability to diagnose Ebola in Mali, samples needed to be sent out, taking three weeks for confirmation "while panic and rumor spread on the streets of the capital and frightened patients sat in quarantine." With the installation of the new laboratory, samples can be processed in only a few hours.

On 25 October, the United Nations Humanitarian Air Service delivered a shipment of about one ton of medical supplies by air to help Mali. Doctors without Borders / Medecins sans Frontieres dispatched a team to Mali late October, to provide technical support to the Ministry of Health. The country shares an 800-kilometer border with Guinea which it continues to monitor.

== Malian healthcare in general ==
There is a dire need for health care assistance in Mali. In 2010, Mali was reported to have about 8 physicians per 100,000 inhabitants and one hospital bed per 10,000 inhabitants. Forty-five percent of the children are malnourished and one in four die before the age of five.

Common diseases in Mali include hepatitis A, malaria, yellow fever and typhoid. Malaria, which kills about 700 thousand people a year in Africa, is caused by a one-celled parasite spread by mosquitos. Mali is part of the "meningitis belt" in West Africa and the disease becomes more common in the dry season between December and June. Mali has also experienced outbreaks of meningococcal meningitis. Tuberculosis, which is a bacterial disease (not a virus like Ebola), is also a leading cause of disease in Mali.

Following the Ebola outbreak, many doctors and nurses that work at the Pasteur Clinic in Bamako are facing the stigma of Ebola, regardless of not having been in contact with any of the admitted Ebola patients. A nurse held out at her house for two days waiting for rescue, while "Several of our doctors' children don't go to school anymore" because "People insult them, close relatives are distant. Even spouses and husbands are panicking," per a comment from the director of the Pasteur Clinic, Dramane Maiga.

As part of a clinical trial, 50 health workers in Mali received an experimental Ebola vaccine during October and November; these workers are involved in the investigation and control of the current outbreak. By 23 November, Mali reported 2 cases of Ebola infection among healthcare workers and 1 had died.

== In music ==
"Africa Stop Ebola", featuring contributions from Malian, Guinean, Ivorian, Congolese and Senegalese artists, was recorded in several of the local languages to raise awareness of Ebola.

== See also ==
- Health in Mali
- Ebola virus epidemic in West Africa
  - Ebola virus epidemic in Guinea
  - Ebola virus epidemic in Liberia
  - Ebola virus epidemic in Sierra Leone
  - Ebola virus disease in Nigeria
- Education in Mali
- HIV/AIDS in Mali
- 2009–10 West African meningitis outbreak
- Northern Mali conflict
