= SIVI =

Former Italian truck manufacturer

SIVI S.p.A.
- Type: Subsidiary of Astra SpA
- Industry: Manufacturing
- Founded: 1982
- Headquarters: Piacenza, Italy
- Products: Commercial vehicles,
- Website: Astraspa.com

The SIVI SpA (Società Italiano Veicoli Industriali) was an Italian truck modification company founded in 1982. Partnered with Iveco from the start, SIVI built vehicles using Iveco trucks as a basis. SIVI was absorbed by Astra SpA in January 2002. By October 2004, SIVI had been integrated completely into the production site of abstraction in Piacenza.

The SIVI Range has always been on the basis of production of Iveco trucks: Eurotech - Eurostar - Eurotrakker and today with the Stralis and Trakker.

== Stralis based models ==
- AT/AS 440 S 43/48/54 T/P-HR EZ 80 4x2 4x2 Tractor / Bus - Motor Iveco Cursor10/13 from 430/480/540 hp - PTT / PTC 20/80 t
- Stralis AS 440 S48/54 TX / P HR EZ 80 6x2 Tractor / Bus - Iveco Cursor13 480/540 hp - PTT / PTC 20/80 t
- Stralis AS 440 S48/54 TZ/P EZ 130 6x4 Tractor / Bus - Iveco Cursor13 480/540 hp - PTT / PTC 32/130 t

== Trakker based models ==
- AT 400 T 44 WT EZ 120 4x4 Tractor / Bus - Engine Cursor13 Iveco 440 hp - PTT / PTC 20/120 t
- PTT/PTC 38/160 t AT / AS 720 T 48/54 H EZ 160 6x4 Tractor / Bus - Iveco Engine Cursor13 540 hp - PTT / PTC 38/160 t
- AT/AS 720 T 54 HT EZ 250 6x4 Trattore /Biuso - Motore Iveco Cursor13 540 cv - PTT/PTC 38/250 t AT / AS 720 T 54 HT EZ 250 6x4 Tractor / Biuso - Engine Cursor13 Iveco 540 hp - PTT / PTC 38/250 t
- AT/AS 720 T 48/54 WT EZ 200 6x6 Tractor / Bus - Iveco Cursor13 440/540 hp PTT / PTC 40/180 t
- AT/AS 720 T 54 WT EZ 275 6x6 Tractor / Bus - Engine Cursor13 Iveco 540 hp - PTT / PTC 40/275 t
- AT/AS 410 T 48/54 EZ 192 8x4 Tractor / Bus - Iveco Cursor13 480/540 hp - PTT / PTC 48/192 t
- AT/AS 410 T 54 EZ 250 8x4 Tractor / Bus - Engine 540 hp Iveco Cursor13 PTT / PTC 48/250 t
- AT/AS 410 T 48/54 H EZ 192 8x4 Car with towing - Engine Cursor13 Iveco 480 hp - PTT / PTC 49/292 t
- AT/AS 410 T 48 H EZ 48 8x4 EZ isolated - Cursor13 Engine Iveco 480 hp - PTT / PTC 48 t
- AT/AS 380 T 54 WT EZ 275 8x6 Tractor / Bus - Engine Cursor13 Iveco 540 hp - PTT / PTC 48/275 t
- AT 410 T 44 W EZ 50 8x8 Wagon isolated - Engine Iveco 440 hp Cursor13 PTT / PTC 48/50 t
- AT/AS 410 T 54 WT EZ 300 8x8 Tractor / Bus - Engine 540 hp Iveco Cursor13 PTT / PTC 48/300 t
