= Iveco EuroTrakker =

Truck model

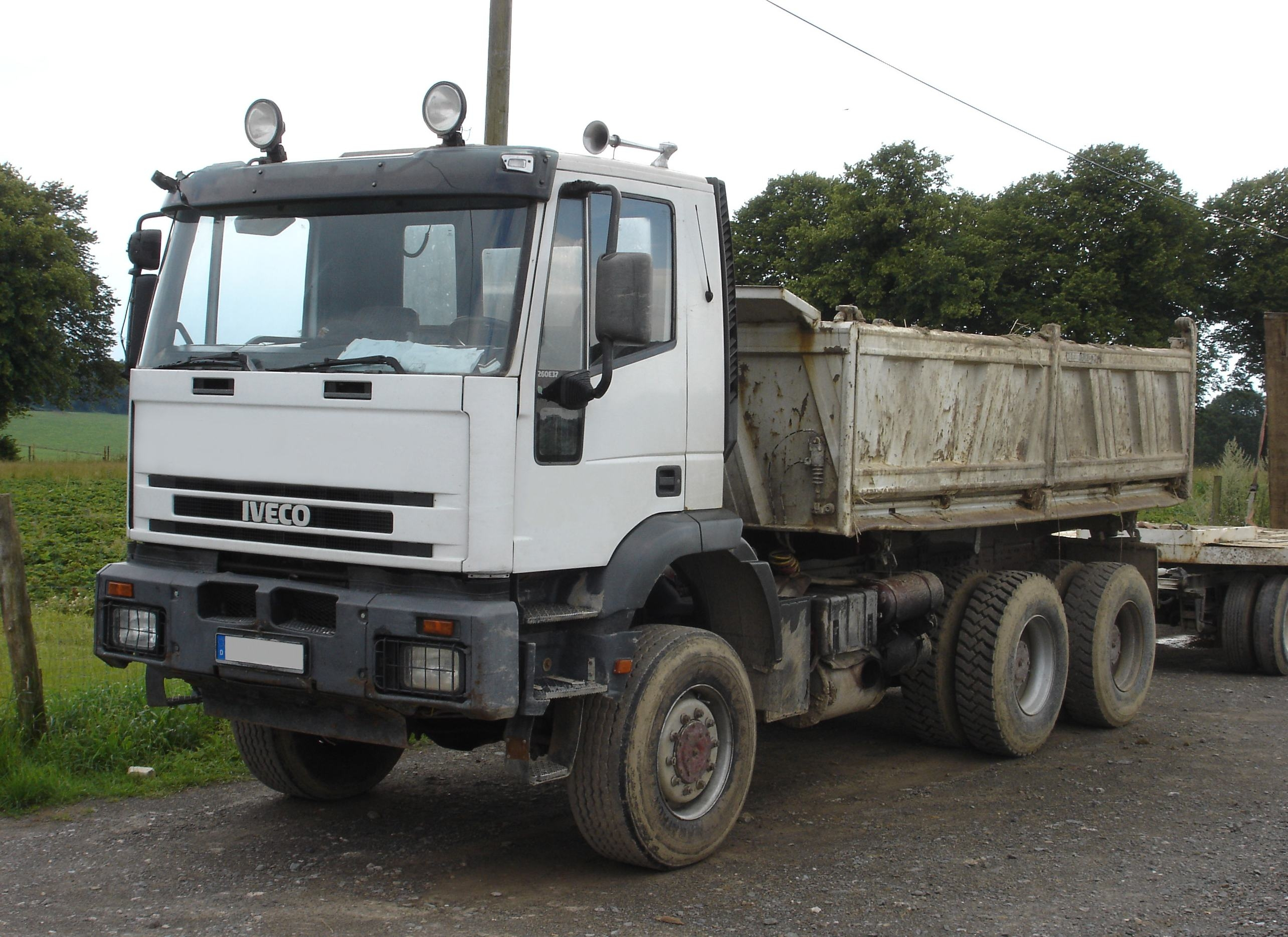

Overview
- Manufacturer: Iveco
- Production: 1993-2004
- Designer: Giorgetto Giugiaro

Body and chassis
- Class: Heavy Duty

Chronology
- Predecessor: Iveco 330
- Successor: Iveco Trakker

The Iveco EuroTrakker is a truck produced by Iveco for use in construction and off-road. Externally, it resembles the EuroTech, with which it shares the cab and many other features. However, it has a stronger frame, greater ground clearance, different axles and optional all-wheel drive.

== Overview ==
The EuroTrakker was first released in 1993. When it entered South Korea, it imported dump trucks for the first time through Halla Heavy Industries, The truck was available in six and eight wheel tipper format, 4x4 and 6x6 rigid format and also a 6x4 tractor format. The engine options offered produced 227hp to 370hp supported by ZF 16 speed manual gearbox and Eaton "Twin Splitter" 12 speed was optional also the high-powered versions offered hub reduction capable of 40 ton payload capacity which made them suitable for super to heavy-duty operations.

The import was practically discontinued when Halla went bankrupt due to the IMF bailout in 1997. The EuroTrakker was discontinued in 2004 when its successor, the Trakker, was released. In Libya, the EuroTrakker is manufactured under the Trucks and Bus Company brand name.
