= Siby =

Siby may refer to:

- Siby (name), a given name and surname (including lists of people with the name)
- Siby, Mali, a village and rural commune in the Cercle of Siby, Koulikoro Region, Mali
- Siby Department, a commune of Balé Province, Burkina Faso
  - Siby, Burkina Faso, capital of Siby Department

== See also ==
- Sybi Hida, Albanian politician
- Sibby, a given name, including a list of people with the name
- Sibi (disambiguation)
