= Astra Veicoli Industriali =

Italian trucks, heavy transport and military vehicles manufacturer

Astra Veicoli Industriali S.p.A.
- Type: Subsidiary
- Industry: Automotive
- Founded: 1946; 80 years ago
- Founder: Mario Bertuzzi
- Headquarters: Piacenza, Italy
- Products: Trucks
- Parent: Leonardo
- Website: www.astra-trucks.com

Astra Veicoli Industriali S.p.A. (Anonima Sarda TRAnsport) is an Italian company that produces trucks, heavy transport vehicles and military vehicles. Astra was privately founded in 1946 in Cagliari, and since 1986 has been part of Iveco. In 1951 Astra moved to Piacenza. From 1946 to 1986 Astra was owned by the Bertuzzi family of Piacenza. ASTRA is an Iveco Group brand. In July 2025, Iveco Group decided to sell its Astra brand to Leonardo while Iveco becomes part of Tata Motors.

== History ==
- 1934 - After work as an engineer for various companies, Mario Bertuzzi opens his first garage near Piacenza.
- 1936-1939 - Bertuzzi works in Italian-occupied Ethiopia, gaining experience and wealth.
- During the war, Bertuzzi owned a repair shop in Piacenza. He relocated to Quarto, in Campania, in 1944, as the Allied bombing raids on the Gothic Line drew closer.
- 1946 - Bertuzzi, operating out of Piacenza, founded a company called Anonima Sarda TRAsporti (Sardinian Transport Company) to buy a lot of 1000 surplus allied military vehicles located in Cagliari, Sardinia. The goal was to ship them back to the mainland and to either convert them to civilian duties, or to rebuild them for the renascent Italian military.
- 1948 - Bertuzzi buys out his partner and sells off the remaining old vehicles for scrap; instead, the company gains contracts for maintaining the vehicles of the Italian as well as the American forces.
- 1951 - The company returns to the civil sector as General Motors approaches Astra to provide service for GM engines in Italy. Work on upgrading new trucks for heavier duty work recommences.
- 1955 - Astra presented the first vehicle of their own design, the BM1. It was meant for use with public works contractors for heavy-duty, off-road work, such as quarries or tunnel construction. The truck had a GM diesel engine and reconditioned AEC Matador axles, plentiful in Italian military depots.
- 1956 - Mario Bertuzzi dies, leaving his sons Camillo and Enzo in charge. Camillo handled the civilian side of the business, Enzo the military side.

During the 1960s, the companies' facility was enlarged several times, and a broader range of vehicles with dumper and mixer models added.

- 1960 - The BM2 appeared, a heavier-duty version of the BM1.
- 1961 - The BM18 appeared, capable of even heavier loads. There were also the similar BM19, and BM21.
- 1962 - Astra's first road-going truck, the three-axle BM12, was introduced.
- 1965 - BM22 - BM25. A new 140,000 square meter plant was opened, and Astra stopped rebuilding outside constructions. New axles were also developed by new technical director Fabio Pavesi, ending the dependence on old material.
- 1967 - The BM16 is introduced, a road-going truck with an automatic transmission.
- 1970 - Launch of giant cranes for chassis BE 8440 and BE 10660. The crane project proved a disappointment and was short-lived.
- 1976 - The BM35 large volume dump truck is introduced, entering a new market sector for Astra.
- 1976 - The BM20 is introduced, a heavy-duty truck with Astra's first own cabin, a spacious two-seater fiberglass construction.

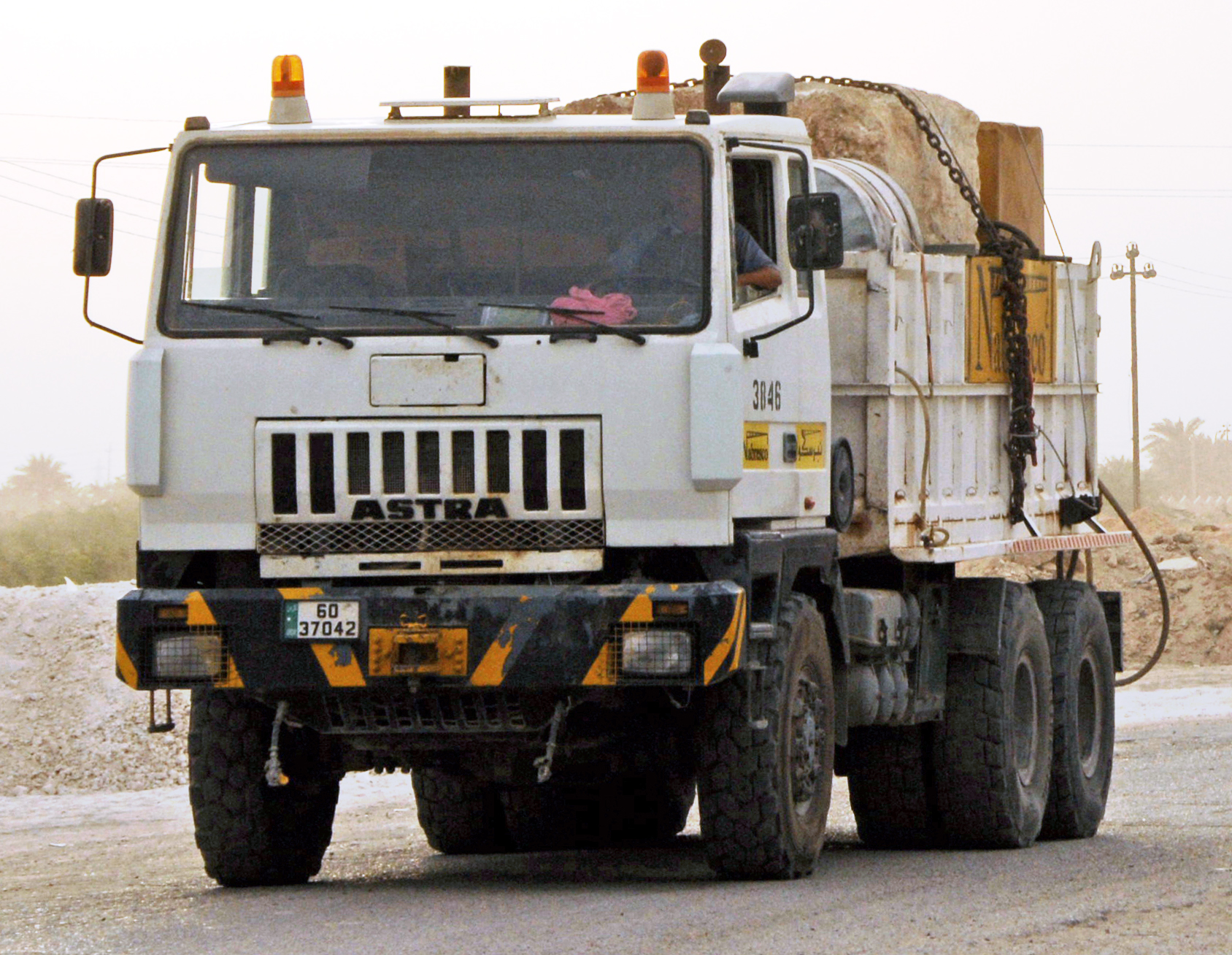
Astra 6000-series ballast tractor, using the Giugiaro-designed cab used until 2000

- 1982 - Launch of the 300-series 6x4 40-tonne highway trucks, the angular cabin was designed by Italdesign Giugiaro.
- 1984 - Astra participates in the Paris-Dakar rally with the BM 309. BM501 added to the range of dump trucks.
- 1986 - After years of contraction, the nearly bankrupt Astra SpA is acquired by Iveco; Astra already had technical cooperation with Iveco since its inception.
- 1989 - Launch of the new 6000 series, still using the 300-series cabin.
- 1992 - Launch of the 6500 series range of technologically advanced trucks.
- 1994 - The designation BM disappears in favour of HD (Heavy Duty), now called the HD6.
- 1996 - ASTRA celebrates 50 years and more than 25,000 vehicles manufactured and sold worldwide. Launch of HD7 series, with a range of 2, 3, and 4 driven axles and IVECO engines ranging from 340 CV (250 kW) to 520 CV (382 kW).
- 1997 - Company receives ISO 9001-2000 certification. Astra Industrial Vehicles SpA also receives the ISO 14001-1996 certification.
- 1999 - The 28- and 40-tonne dump trucks were added to the range, available with an automatic transmission - the first in the world to be installed in such heavy-duty quarry vehicles.
- 2000 - The HD7 range is complemented by the new HD7/C series, equipped with new Iveco Cursor (Euro 3) engines. At ESIS (Batimat Italian) Astra unveils a new range of articulated dump trucks (ADT) - models ADT25 and ADT30, with 25 and 30 tonnes of payload respectively.
- 2003 - On 1 January Astra took over SIVI, itself a partner of Iveco since 1982. SIVI modifies ASTRA trucks for heavy-duty applications.
- 2004 - Two new models of 35 and 40 tonnes of payload are added to the range of articulated dump trucks: the ADT35 and ADT40, both powered by Iveco Cursor 13 engines.
- 2005 - The new range of HD8 construction trucks was introduced, which replaces the HD7 and HD7/C.
- 2011 - The new HD9 range replaced the HD8. With a cabin in sheet metal (as used on the Iveco Trakker) Astra now abandoned their long tradition of fiberglass cabs.
- 2025 - Iveco decides to sell Astra to Leonardo while Iveco becomes part of Tata Motors

== Quarry and construction vehicles ==
Currently, the production of vehicles by Astra includes a number of construction-oriented trucks (HD8), rigid dump trucks (RD), and articulated dump trucks (ADT). Production of vehicles began in 1955 with the construction of the BM1, a rigid dump truck that had some success. Following the enlargement of the factory, the BM series was extended, and the model BM 309 participated in the Paris-Dakar in the truck category. In 1996, the fiftieth anniversary of the company's founding, the HD7 series went on the market, which also had some success. In 2005 this was replaced by the current HD8 range. In 2009 Astra launched a new range of heavy-duty vehicles called HHD.

== Vehicles for special use ==
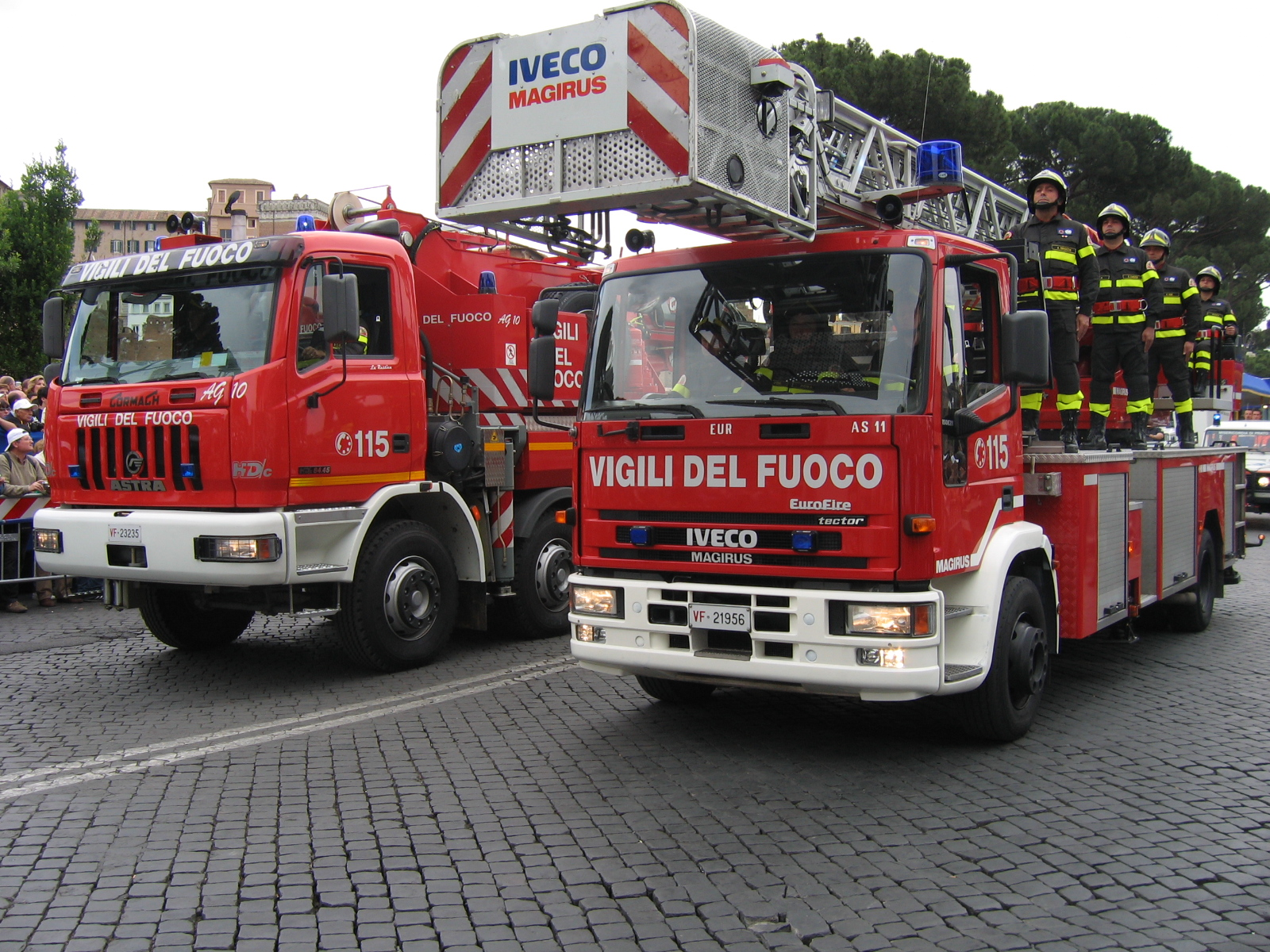
Italian Fire Service vehicles with an Astra fire truck, on left

In 2002 the company absorbed Astra SIVI (a partner of Iveco from 1982), which produced vehicles for heavy transport, and in 2004 completely integrated production by SIVI. Vehicles produced by SIVI Astra are all produced on the basis of Iveco vehicles, currently Stralis and Trakker.

== Products ==
The Astra range of products includes:

- Heavy construction trucks, with the BM1 series launched in 1955, the WB series 12-16-18-19-20-E1-22 and 25, then the 300 series and 6000 until 1994; HD6, HD7, HD7c appeared in 2000, and HD8 in 2005
- Trucks for special applications, produced by SIVI, based on Fiat and Iveco chassis, Iveco Trakker with 720T55EZ and 720 tonnes of PTR,
- RD - rigid dump trucks
- AD - articulated dump trucks
- Military trucks group - Iveco Defense.

=== Military ===
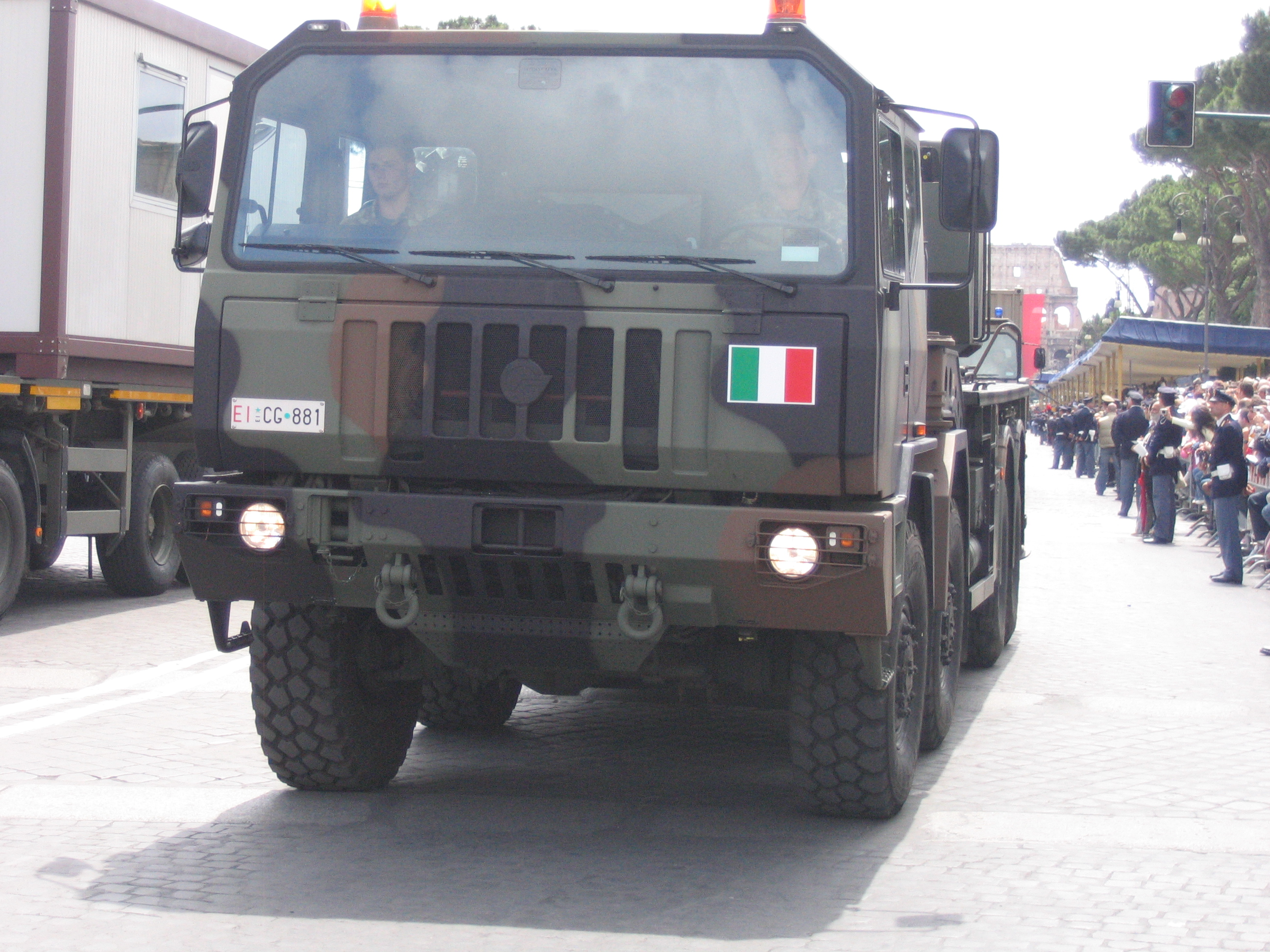
Astra Military Truck in the Italian army parade in Italy, 2007.

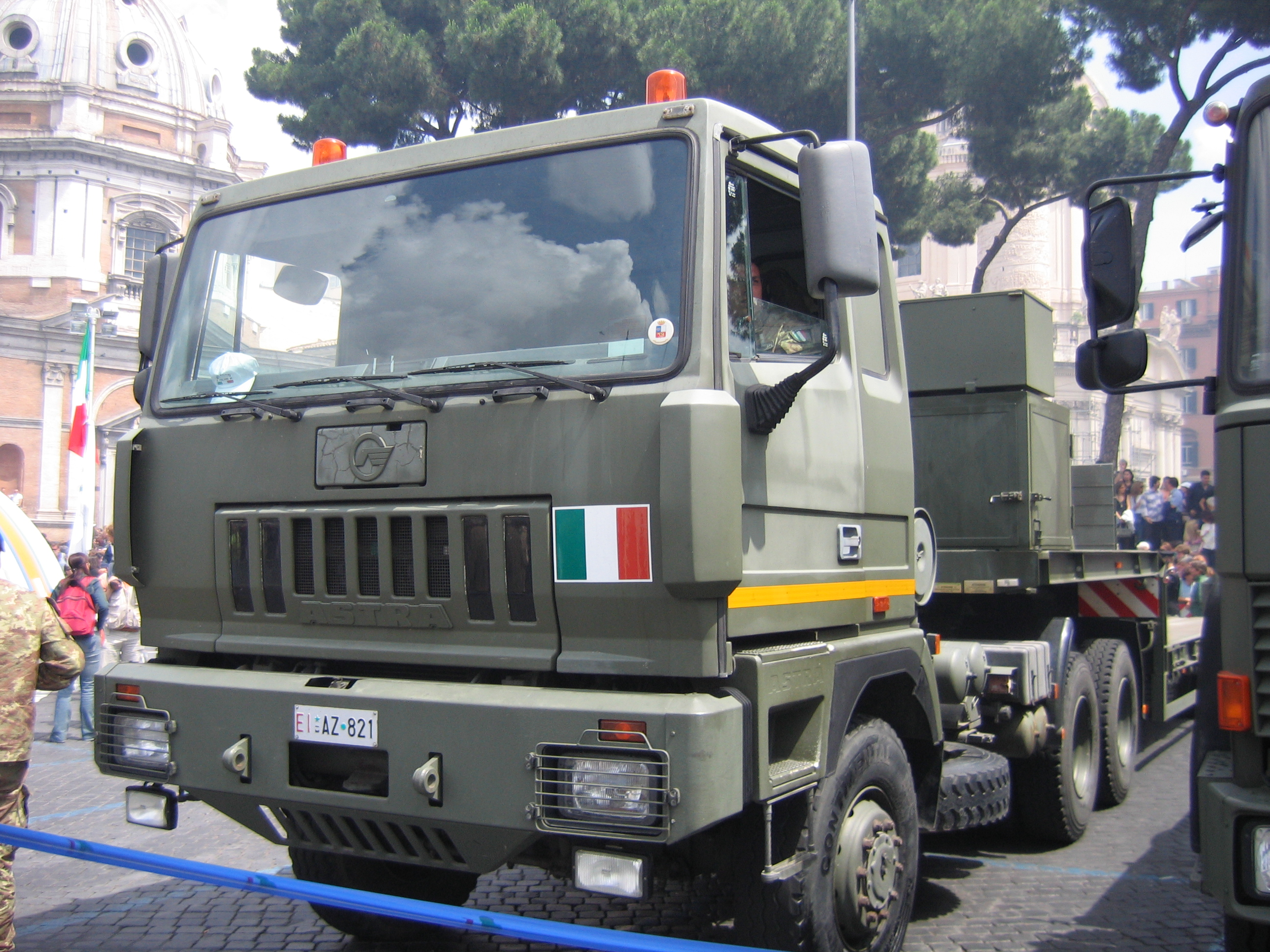
Astra HD7 Military Truck in the Italian army parade in Italy, 2007.

Since 1990, Astra SpA has built the entire military range of trucks produced by the Iveco group.

=== Highway trucks ===
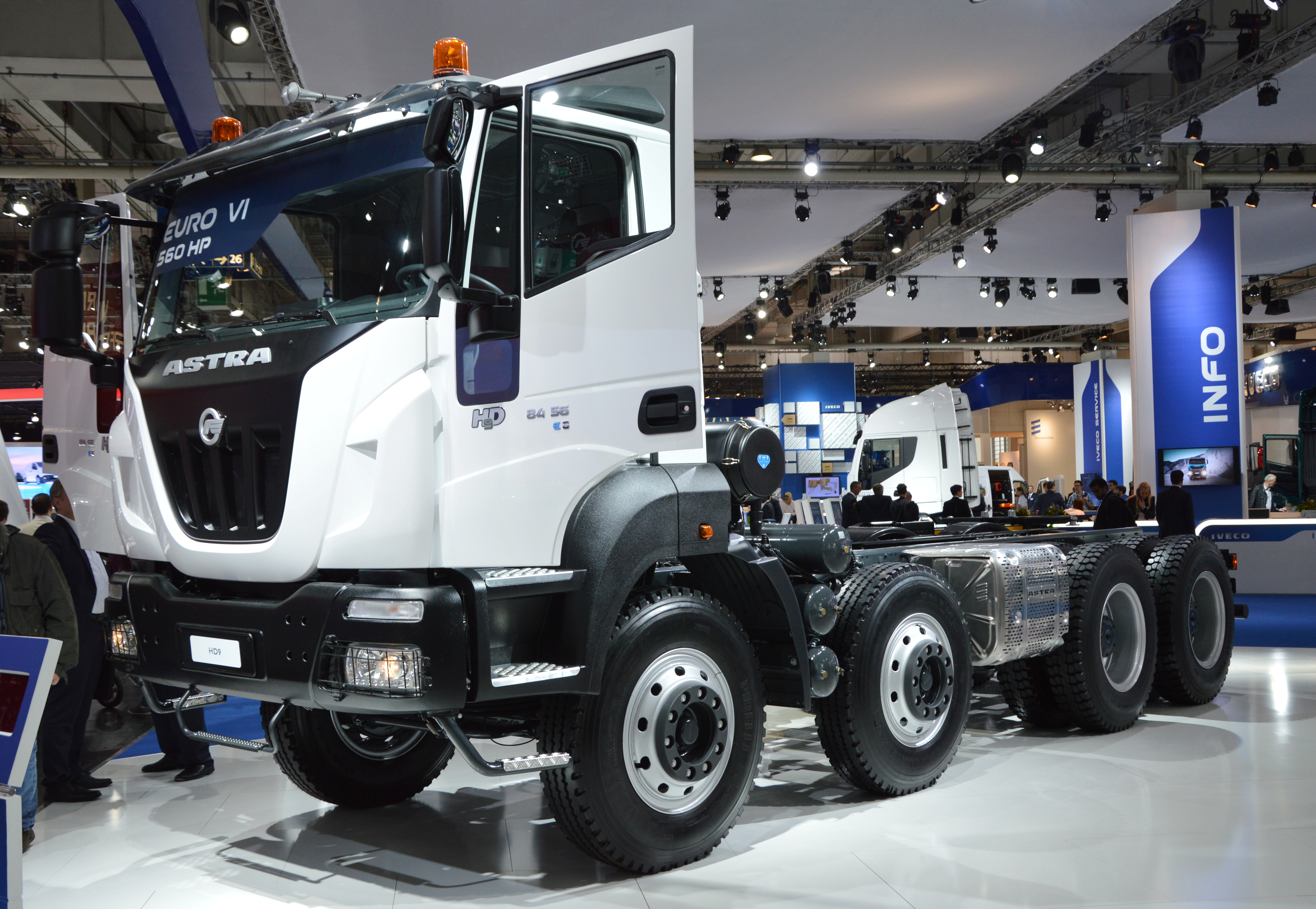
Astra HD9 8456 EURO6. 8-wheeler. Power: 560 hp.

The HD7 series in cargo and tractor versions are as follows.

Model	Configuration	Motor type	Cylinder cc	CV	PTC / PTR and t
HD7 42.38	4x2	Iveco 8210.42K	13798	380	20 / 44
HD7 42.42	4x2	Iveco 8210.42L	13798	420	20 / 44
HD7 44.34	4x4	Iveco 8460.41K	9498	340	20 / 44
HD7 44.38	4x4	Iveco 8210.42K	13798	380	20 / 44
HD7 44.42	4x4	Iveco 8210.42L	13798	420	20 / 44
HD7 64.34	6x4	Iveco 8460.41K	9498	340	33 / 56
HD7 66.34	6x6	Iveco 8460.41K	9498	340	33 / 56
HD7 64.38	6x4	Iveco 8210.42K	13798	380	33 / 56
HD7 66.38	6x6	Iveco 8210.42K	13798	380	33 / 56
HD7 64.42	6x4	Iveco 8210.42L	13798	420	33 / 56
HD7 66.42	6x6	Iveco 8210.42L	13798	420	33 / 56
HD7 64.45	6x4	Iveco 8280.42B	17174	440	33 / 56
HD7 66.45	6x6	Iveco 8280.42B	17174	450	33 / 56
HD7 64.47	6x4	Iveco 8210.42B	13798	470	33 / 56
HD7 64.52	6x4	Iveco 8280.42S	17174	520	33 / 56
HD7 66.52	6x6	Iveco 8280.42S	17174	520	33 / 56
HD7 84.38	8x4	Iveco 8210.42K	13798	380	40-48
HD7 84.42	8x4	Iveco 8210.42L	13798	420	40-48
HD7 86.42	8x6	Iveco 8210.42L	13798	420	40-48
HD7 84.45	8x4	Iveco 8280.42B	17174	440	40-48
HD7 86.45	8x6	Iveco 8280.42B	17174	450	40-48
HD7 84.47	8x4	Iveco 8210.42B	13798	470	40-48
HD7 84.52	8x4	Iveco 8280.42S	17174	520	40-48
HD7 86.52	8x6	Iveco 8280.42S	17174	520	40-48

HD7/C series, HD8, equipped with Iveco Motors Cursor 13.

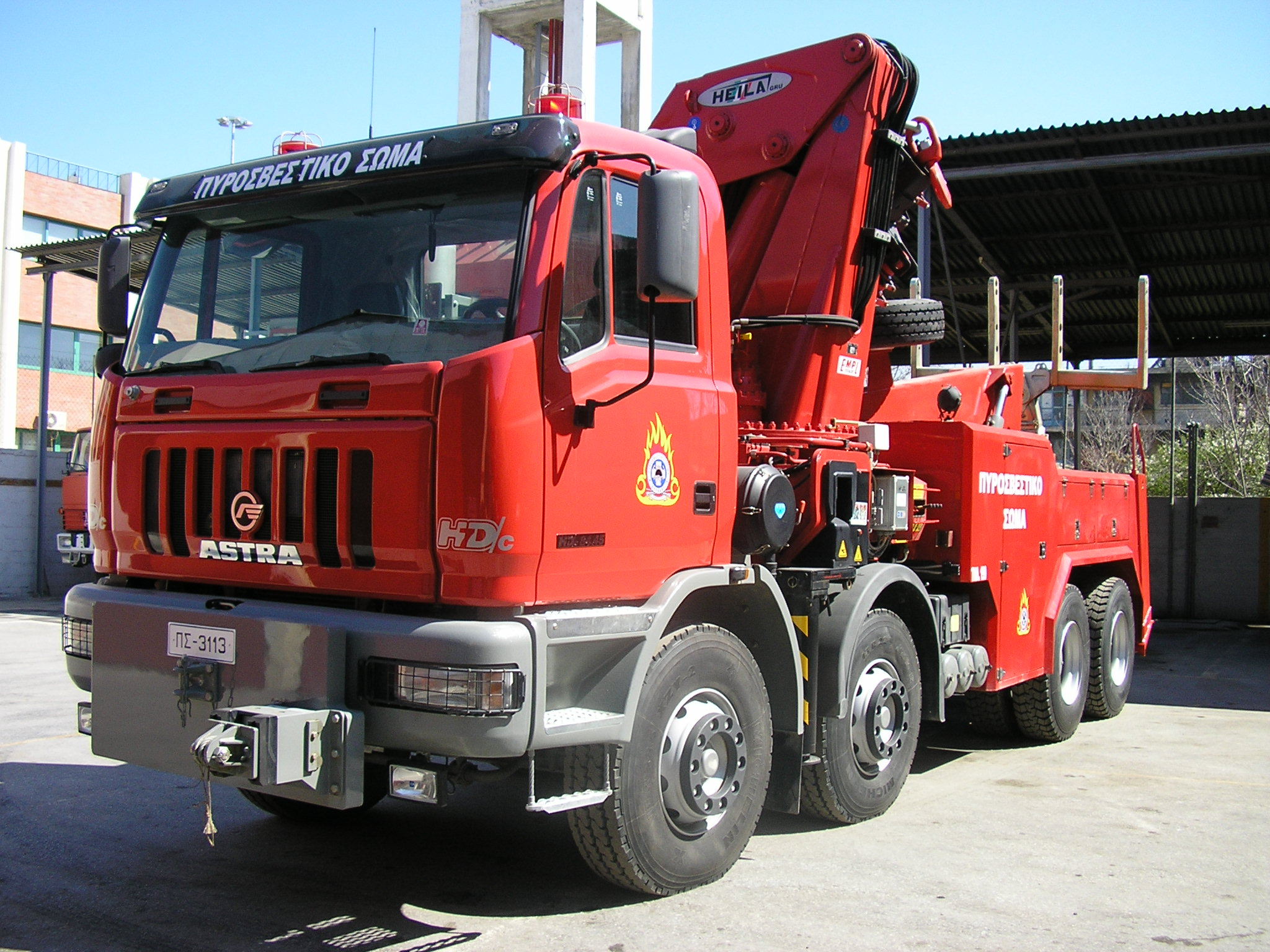
Astra HD7C 84-45 tow truck of the Fire Service of Greece.

The HD7/C series, equipped with motors type Cursor 13 Euro 4 consists of:

Model	Configuration	Motor type	Cylinder cc	CV	PTC / PTR t
HD7c 42.36	4x2	Iveco F3B E0681JB	12882	360	20 / 44
HD7c 44.36	4x4	Iveco F3B E0681JB	12882	360	20 / 44
HD7c 42.40	4x2	Iveco F3B E0681HB	12882	400	20 / 44
HD7c 44.40	4x4	Iveco F3B E0681HB	12882	400	20 / 44
HD7c 42.45	4x2	Iveco F3B E0681DB	12882	450	20 / 44
HD7c 44.45	4x4	Iveco F3B E0681DB	12882	450	20 / 44
HD7c 64.36	6x4	Iveco F3B E0681JB	12882	360	33 / 56
HD7c 66.36	6x6	Iveco F3B E0681JB	12882	360	33 / 56
HD7c 64.40	6x4	Iveco F3B E0681HB	12882	400	33 / 56
HD7c 66.40	6x6	Iveco F3B E0681HB	12882	400	33 / 56
HD7c 64.45	6x4	Iveco F3B E0681DB	12882	450	33 / 56
HD7c 66.45	6x6	Iveco F3B E0681DB	12882	450	33 / 56
HD7c 64.50	6x4	Iveco F3B E0681FB	12882	500	33 / 56
HD7c 66.50	6x6	Iveco F3B E0681FB	12882	500	33 / 56
HD7c 84.36	8x4	Iveco F3B E0681JB	12882	360	40-48
HD7c 84.40	8x4	Iveco F3B E0681HB	12882	400	40-48
HD7c 84.45	8x4	Iveco F3B E0681DB	12882	450	40-48
HD7c 86.45	8x6	Iveco F3B E0681DB	12882	450	40-48
HD7c 88.45	8x8	Iveco F3B E0681DB	12882	450	40-48
HD7c 84.50	8x4	Iveco F3B E0681FB	12882	500	40-48
HD7c 86.50	8x6	Iveco F3B E0681FB	12882	500	40-48
HD7c 88.50	8x8	Iveco F3B E0681FB	12882	500	40-48

The new HD8 series, equipped with the also new Iveco Cursor 13 Euro 5 contains 16 configurations of chassis with 5 different motors:

Model	Configuration	Motor type	Cylinder cc	CV	PTC / PTR t
HD8 42.41	4x2	Iveco F3B E3681D	12882	410	20 / 44-49
HD8 44.41	4x4	Iveco F3B E3681D	12882	410	20 / 44-49
HD8 42.44	4x2	Iveco F3B E3681G	12882	440	20 / 44-49
HD8 44.44	4x4	Iveco F3B E3681G	12882	440	20 / 44-49
HD8 44.48	4x4	Iveco F3B E3681F	12882	480	20 / 44-49
HD8 64.41	6x4	Iveco F3B E3681D	12882	410	33 / 56
HD8 64.44	6x4	Iveco F3B E3681D	12882	440	33 / 56
HD8 64.48	6x4	Iveco F3B E3681F	12882	480	33 / 56
HD8 66.48	6x6	Iveco F3B E3681F	12882	480	33 / 56
HD8 64.52	6x4	Iveco F3B E3681E	12882	520	33 / 56
HD8 66.52	6x6	Iveco F3B E3681E	12882	520	33 / 56
HD8 64.56	6x4	Iveco F3B E3681A	12882	560	33 / 56
HD8 66.56	6x6	Iveco F3B E3681A	12882	560	33 / 56
HD8 84.41	8x4	Iveco F3B E3681D	12882	410	40-48
HD8 84.44	8x4	Iveco F3B E3681G	12882	440	40-48
HD8 86.44	8x6	Iveco F3B E3681G	12882	440	40-48
HD8 84.48	8x4	Iveco F3B E3681F	12882	480	40-48
HD8 86.48	8x6	Iveco F3B E3681F	12882	480	40-48
HD8 88.48	8x8	Iveco F3B E3681F	12882	480	40-48
HD8 84.52	8x4	Iveco F3B E3681E	12882	520	40-48
HD8 86.52	8x6	Iveco F3B E3681E	12882	520	40-48
HD8 88.52	8x8	Iveco F3B E3681E	12882	520	40-48
HD8 84.56	8x4	Iveco F3B E3681A	12882	560	40-48
HD8 86.56	8x6	Iveco F3B E3681A	12882	560	40-48
HD8 88.56	8x8	Iveco F3B E3681A	12882	560	40-48

Two special series of HD8 are destined for foreign markets:

- Spain with a PTR of 104T for special convoys
- Libya with Iveco 8000 series engines, which are also mounted on locally assembled Iveco trucks.

=== Dump trucks ===
Rigid

Model	Configuration	Motor type	Cylinder cc	CV	PTC/PTR t	Volume m3
RD 28 C	4x2	Iveco F3A	10300	353	48,5	17,7
RD 32 C	4x2	Iveco F3A	10300	381	54	20,1

Articulated

Model	Configuration	Motor type	Cylinder cc	CV	PTC/PTR t	Volume m3
ADT 25 C	6x6	Iveco F3A	10300	320	45	14,5
ADT 30 C	6x6	Iveco F3A	10300	353	51	17,6
ADT 35 C	6x6	Iveco F3B	12882	410	60	20,0
ADT 40 C	6x6	Iveco F3B	12882	455	66	22,0

== See also ==
- List of Italian companies

== Notes and references ==
1. ↑ Astra dumptrucks at dumper.fr (French)
