= Sibi (disambiguation) =

Sibi is a city in Balochistan, Pakistan.

Sibi may also refer to:

- Sibi (king), a character in Hindu and Buddhist mythology
- Sibi (name), including a list of people with the name
- Sibi District, in Balochistan, Pakistan
  - Sibi Tehsil, a subdivision of Sibi District
    - Sibi, capital city of the district and tehsil
  - Sibi Division, a former administrative division of Balochistan, Pakistan
- Sibi, Iran, a village in Sabzevar County, Razavi Khorasan Province
- Sibi, a character in the 2010 documentary Sibi, l’âme du violon

== See also ==
- Shibi (disambiguation)
- Siby (disambiguation)
