= Shibi =

Shibi may refer to:

- Shibi (king), a figure in Hindu and Buddhist mythology
- Shibi (roof tile), a roof ornament in Japanese traditional architecture
- Shibi Khan, 9th khagan of the Göktürk empire, a rebel against Chinese suzerainty, reigned 611–619 CE

== China ==
- Shibi Railway Station, or New Guangzhou Railway Station, a railway station in Panyu, Guangzhou
- Shibi, Fujian (石壁镇), town in Ninghua County
- Shibi, Hainan (石壁镇), town in Qionghai
- Shibi, Jiangxi (石鼻镇), town in Anyi County

== See also ==
- Sibi (disambiguation)
