= Sichan, South Khorasan =

Sichan سيچان
- Village
- Location within Iran
- Coordinates: 33°12′43″N 59°09′20″E
- Country: Iran
- Province: South Khorasan
- County: Birjand
- Bakhsh: Central
- Rural District: Fasharud

Population (2016)
  - Total: 72
- Time zone: UTC+3:30 (IRST)
  - Summer (DST): UTC+4:30 (IRDT)

Sichan (Persian: سيچان, also Romanized as Sīchān; also known as Sīchāh) is a village in Fasharud Rural District, in the Central District of Birjand County, South Khorasan Province, Iran. At the 2016 census, its population was 72, in 30 families.
