= Sunaj, Saqqez =

Sunaj سونج
- Village
- Location within Iran
- Coordinates: 36°19′41″N 46°06′59″E
- Country: Iran
- Province: Kurdistan
- County: Saqqez
- Bakhsh: Central
- Rural District: Sara

Population (2006)
  - Total: 261
- Time zone: UTC+3:30 (IRST)
  - Summer (DST): UTC+4:30 (IRDT)

Sunaj (Persian: سونج, also Romanized as Sūnaj; also known as Sūtaj) is a village in Sara Rural District, in the Central District of Saqqez County, Kurdistan Province, Iran. At the 2006 census, its population was 261, in 38 families. The village is populated by Kurds.
