= Sharegeh, Marivan =

Sharegeh شرگه
- Village
- Location within Iran
- Coordinates: 35°36′48″N 46°12′30″E
- Country: Iran
- Province: Kurdistan
- County: Marivan
- Bakhsh: Khav and Mirabad
- Rural District: Khav and Mirabad

Population (2006)
  - Total: 89
- Time zone: UTC+3:30 (IRST)
  - Summer (DST): UTC+4:30 (IRDT)

Sharegeh (Persian: شرگه, also Romanized as Shargah and Shargeh; also known as Sharkah and Sharkeh) is a village in Khav and Mirabad Rural District, Khav and Mirabad District, Marivan County, Kurdistan Province, Iran. At the 2006 census, its population was 89, in 16 families. The village is populated by Kurds.
