= Shavi, Shadegan =

Shavi شاوي
- Village
- Location within Iran
- Coordinates: 30°47′04″N 48°46′31″E
- Country: Iran
- Province: Khuzestan
- County: Shadegan
- Bakhsh: Central
- Rural District: Hoseyni

Population (2006)
  - Total: 73
- Time zone: UTC+3:30 (IRST)
  - Summer (DST): UTC+4:30 (IRDT)

Shavi (Persian: شاوي, also Romanizeed as Shāvī) is a village in Hoseyni Rural District, in the Central District of Shadegan County, Khuzestan Province, Iran. At the 2006 census, its population was 73, in 16 families.
