= Sibby =

Sibby is a given name or nickname.

Notable people with the name include:

- Sibby Flowers (born 1963), American weightlifter
- Sibby Nichols (1884–1957), Canadian ice-hockey player
- Sibby Sisti (1920–2006), American baseball player
- Sibimet ("Sibby"), a character in the Sylvie and Bruno novels by Lewis Carroll

== See also ==
- Siby (disambiguation)
