= Iveco Trakker =

Construction truck

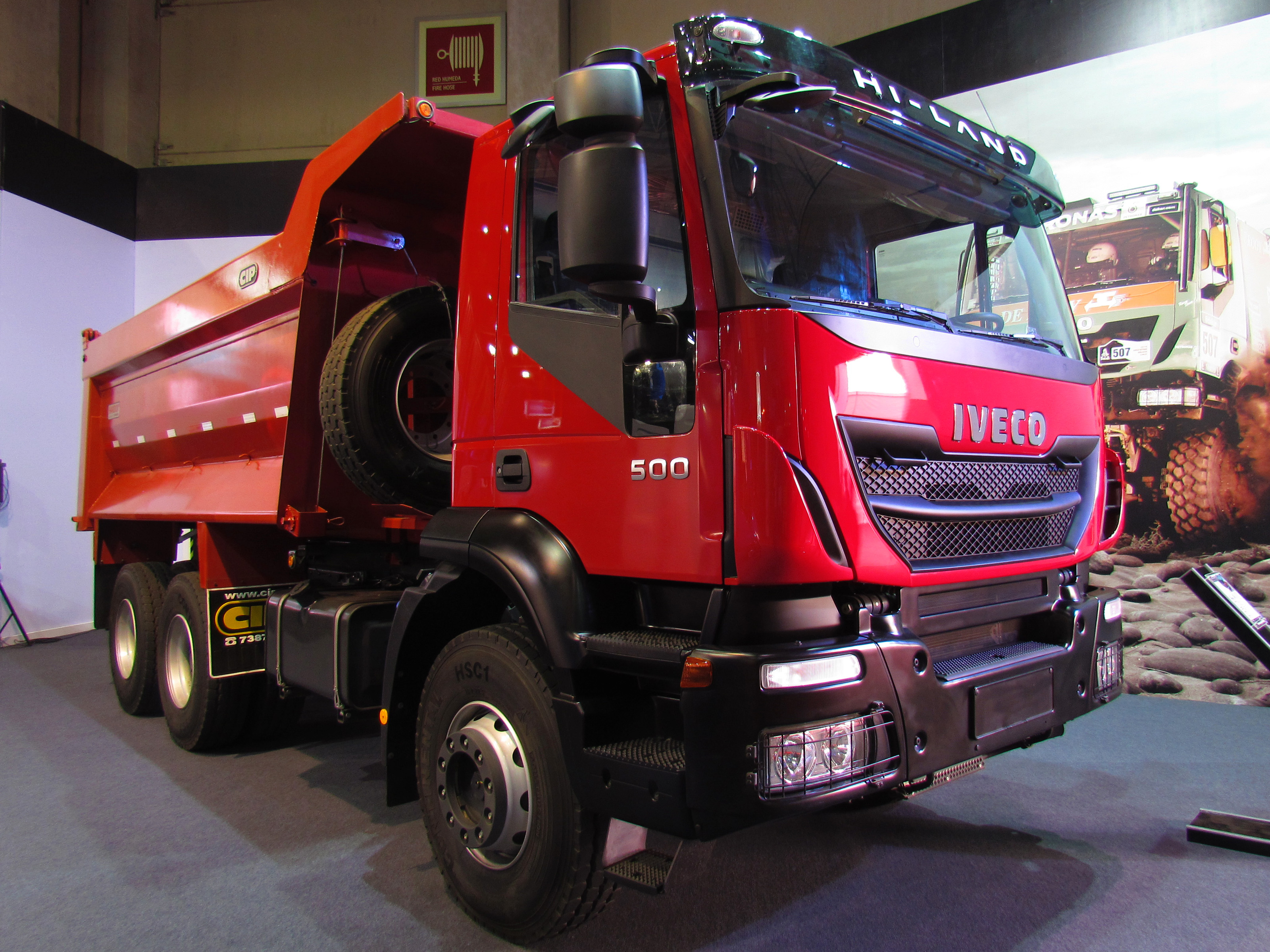

Overview
- Manufacturer: Iveco
- Production: 2004-2021

Body and chassis
- Class: Heavy Duty

Powertrain
- Transmission: ZF
- Propulsion: Cursor

Chronology
- Predecessor: Iveco EuroTrakker
- Successor: Iveco T-Way

The Iveco Trakker was launched in 2004 as a replacement for the EuroTrakker as an off and on road heavy-duty product. The new model had exterior and interior improvements from the discontinued model, which also had the same Cursor engine with power figures ranging from 310 to 480 hp.

In 2012 a facelift for the Trakker was launched with sharp exterior and new interior from the Hi-Street and Hi-Road Stralis models with improved power figures to 500 hp.

In 2021 Iveco replaced the Trakker with a new model named T-Way T in the name Tough Powered by their latest Cursor engines with max power output of 510 hp. Available in rigid and tractor configuration, supported by a ZF 12 and 16 speed transmission.

== Motors ==
The Trakker is powered by the Cursor engine family. Every engine uses selective catalytic reduction to meet European emission standards.

| Motor | Displacement (l) | Power (kW) at n (R/min) | Torque (Nm) at (R/min) |
|---|---|---|---|
Diesel
| Cursor 9 | 8,709 | 243 at 2200 | 1400 at 1200 |
| Cursor 9 | 8,709 | 265 at 2200 | 1650 at 1200 |
| Cursor 9 | 8,709 | 294 at 2200 | 1700 at 1200 |
| Cursor 13 | 12,882 | 302 at 1900 | 2100 at 900 |
| Cursor 13 | 12,882 | 331 at 1900 | 2300 at 970 |
| Cursor 13 | 12,882 | 368 at 1900 | 2500 at 900 |

== Axle ends and drive combinations ==
Trakker range
| Model | Drive | GVW (ton) | GCW (ton) | Power (hp) | Cab |
|---|---|---|---|---|---|
| Chassis | 4x2 | 19 | - | 380 | Long-Short |
| Tractor | 4x2 | 19 | 44 | 380-440 | Long-Short |
| Chassis | 4x4 | 19 | - | 380-440 | Long-Short |
| Tractor | 4x4 | 19 | 44 | 380-440 | Long-Short |
| Chassis | 6x4 | 26-33 | - | 380-440 | Long-Short |
| Tractor | 6x4 | 33 | 72 | 380-440 | Long-Short |
| Chassis | 6x6 | 33 | - | 380-440 | Long-Short |
| Tractor | 6x6 | 33 | 72 | 380-440 | Long-Short |
| Chassis | 8x4 | 34-41 | - | 380-440 | Long-Short |
| Chassis | 8x8 | 41 | - | 420-440 | Short |

== Gallery ==
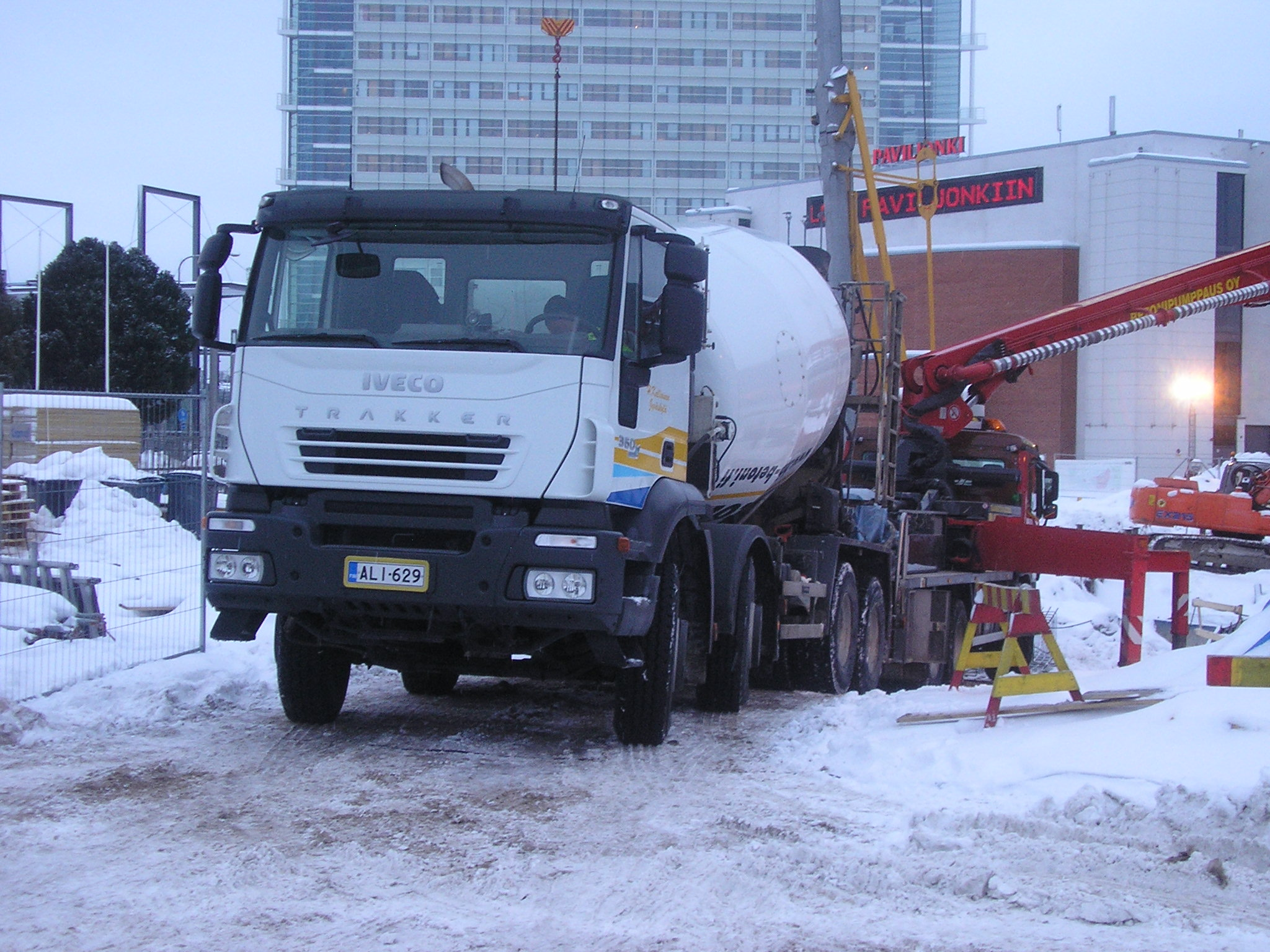
8x4 Concrete mixer
Jyväskylä, Finland

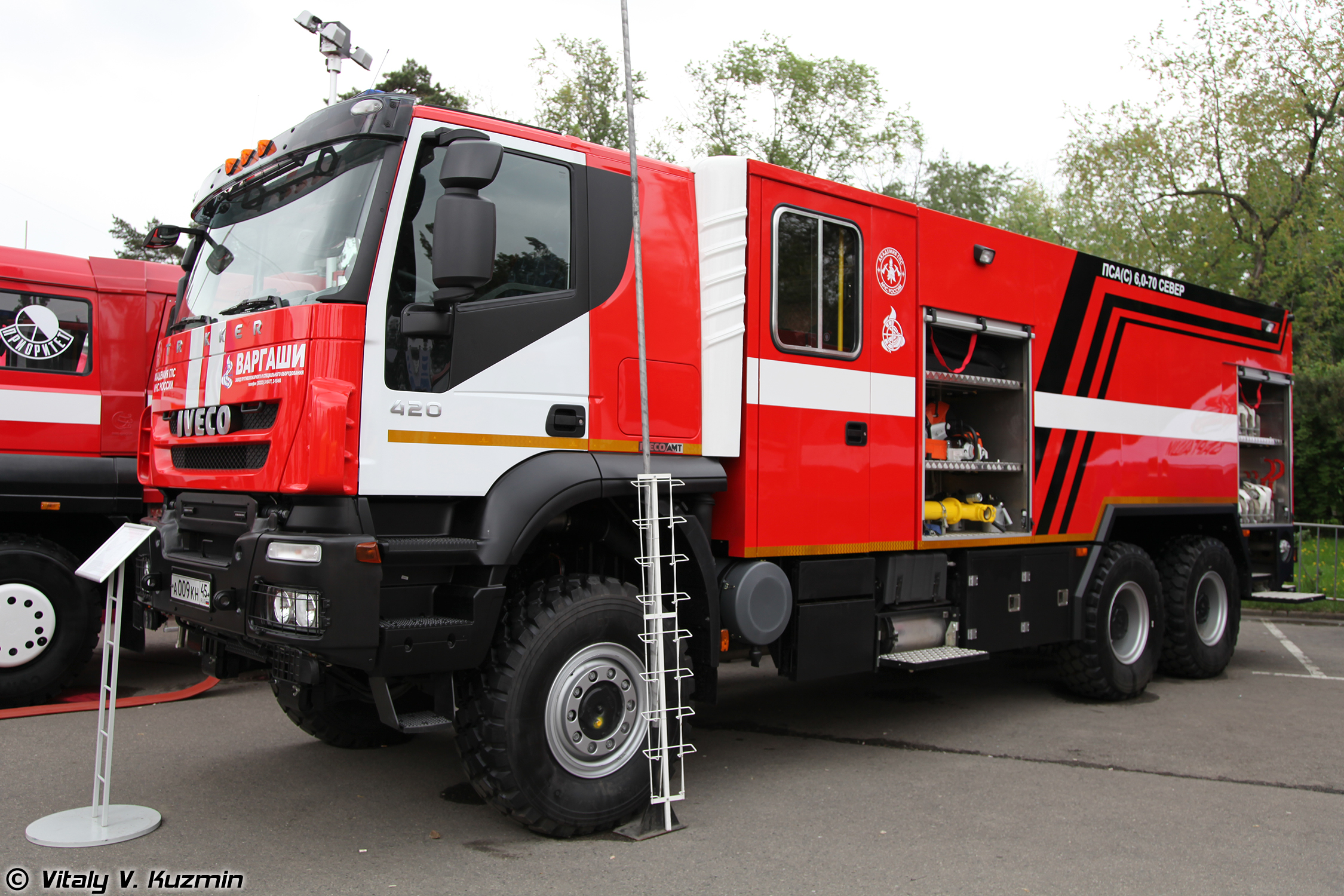
6x6 Firefighting and rescue
Moscow, Russia

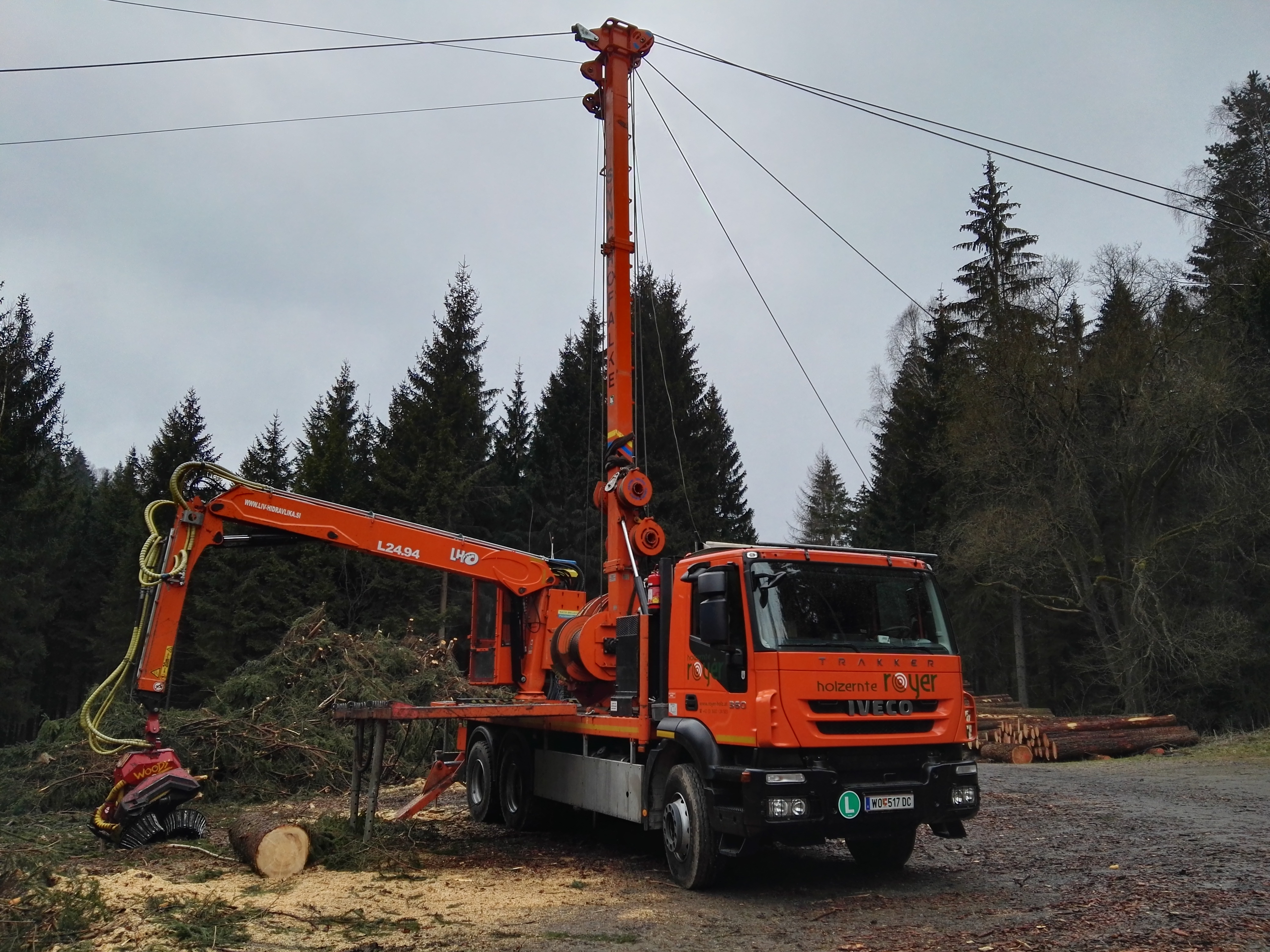
6x4 Wood harvester
near Ottomühle, Germany

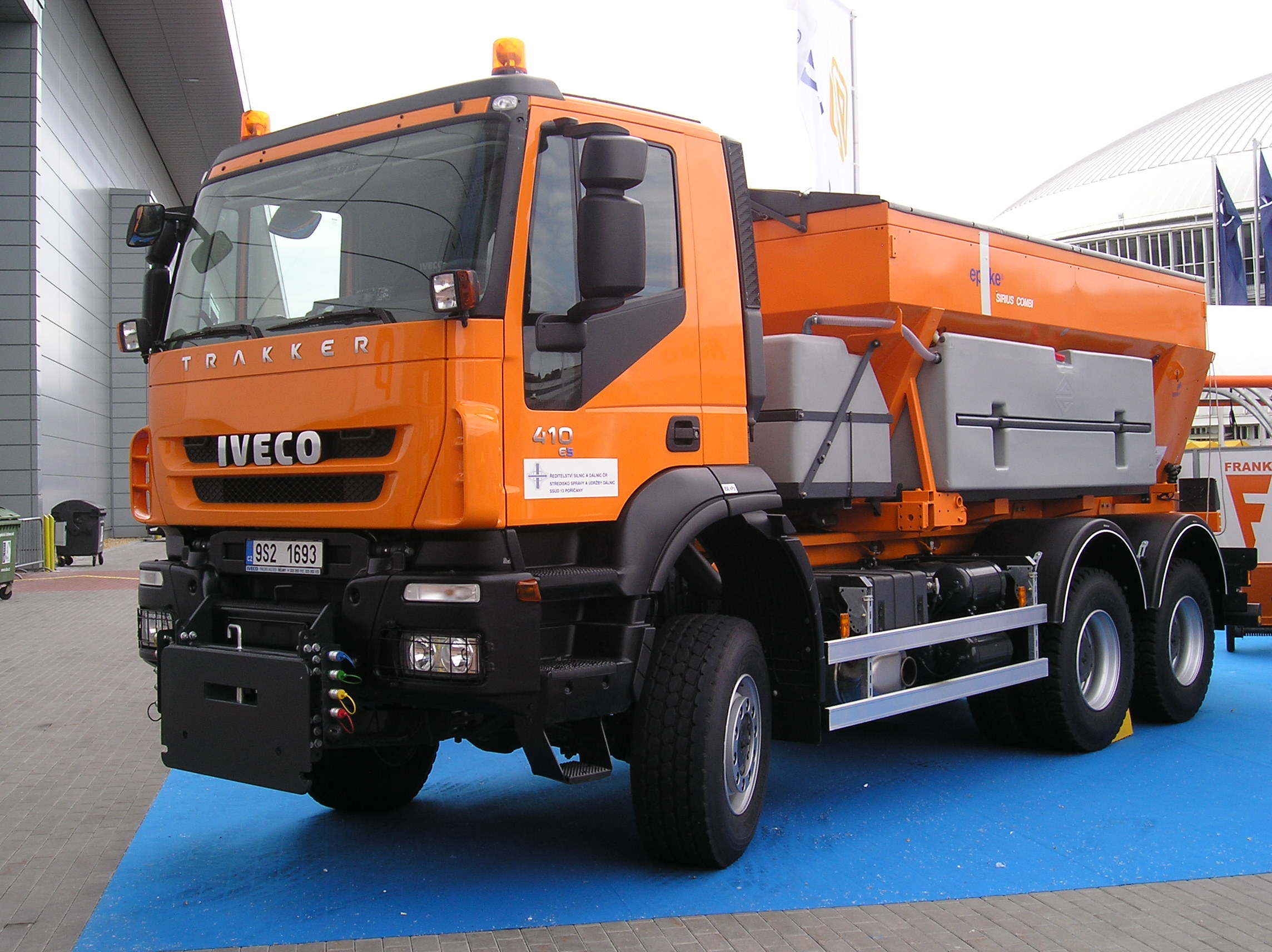
6x6 for snow removal
Brno, Czechia

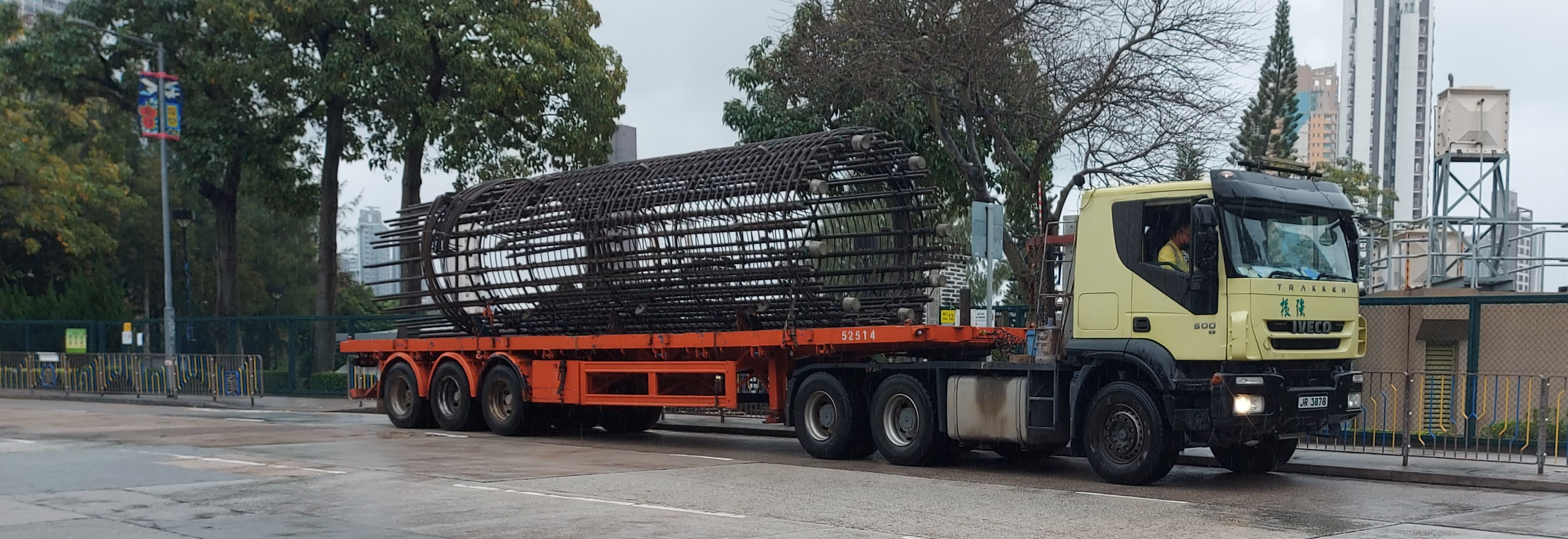
12x12 tractor unit
Hong Kong, China
