= Fanta Siby =

Malinese Minister of Health (born 1962)

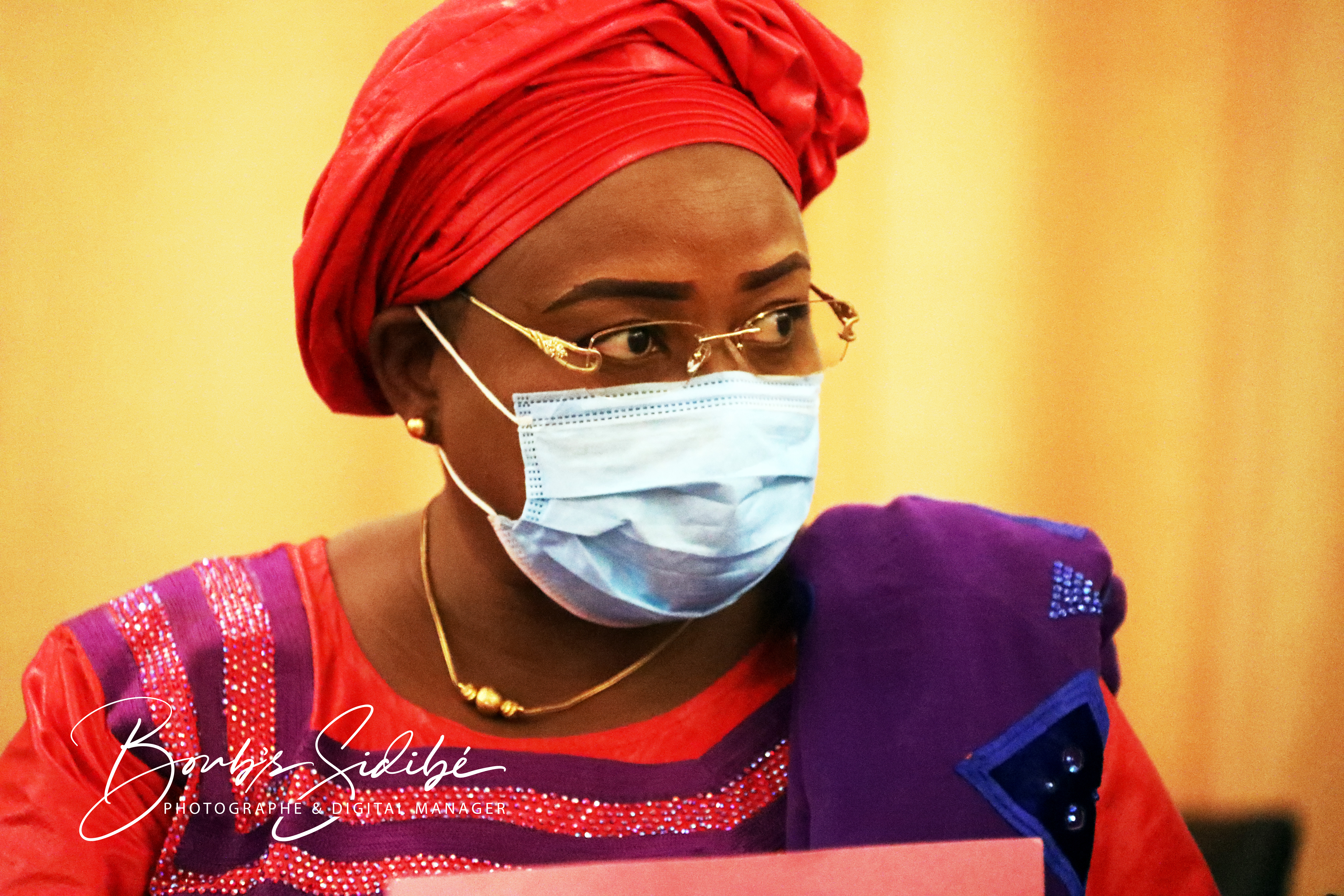

Fanta Siby (born 1962) is a Malian medical doctor and former Minister of Health and Social Development.

She qualified in medicine at the University of Bamako in 1990.

She was appointed Minister of Health and Social Development on 5 October 2020, and was replaced on 11 June 2021 by Diéminatou Sangaré.
