= Sibi, l'âme du violon =

Sibi, l’âme du violon
- Directed by: Michel K. Zongo
- Produced by: Berni Goldblat
- Cinematography: Michel K. Zongo
- Edited by: Berni Goldblat
- Music by: Sibi Zongo
- Production company: Les Films du Djabadjah
- Release date: November 12, 2011
- Running time: 38 minutes
- Country: Burkina Faso

Sibi, l’âme du violon is a 2011 documentary film directed by Michel K. Zongo, first shown at Amiens International Film Festival.

== Synopsis ==
A blind violinist called Sibi has been singing and playing in carabets in the most popular neighborhoods of Koudougou, Burkina Faso, for more than 30 years. He knows the origins of the ethnic groups and the most important family lines in the region. Despite his blindness and the general indifference around him, he holds the living history of the region and its oral traditions, now threatened with extinction. This story is a message in a bottle, of sorts, for viewers to pay attention to his story before it is too late and these traditions disappear forever.

== Awards ==
- FESPACO 2011 Special Mention
