= Shuy Rural District =

Rural district in Kurdistan province, Iran

Shuy Rural District Persian: دهستان شوئ
- Rural District
- Location within Iran Location within Iran Kurdistan
- Coordinates: 36°03′N 45°55′E
- Country: Iran
- Province: Kurdistan
- County: Baneh
- District: Central
- Capital: Shuy

Population (2016)
  - Total: 12,221
- Time zone: UTC+3:30 (IRST)

Shuy Rural District (Persian: دهستان شوئ) is in the Central District of Baneh County, Kurdistan province, Iran. Its capital is the village of Shuy.

== Demographics ==
=== Population ===
At the time of the 2006 National Census, the rural district's population was 8,381 in 1,665 households. There were 11,053 inhabitants in 2,544 households at the following census of 2011. The 2016 census measured the population of the rural district as 12,221 in 3,178 households. The most populous of its 36 villages was Sabadlu, with 1,620 people.

=== Other villages in the rural district ===
- Boneh Rezan
- Khvajeh Mir
- Kupich-e Sofla
- Qai Bard
- Rashid Qaleh
- Savan
- Tarkhanabad
