= Central District (Baneh County) =

District in Kurdistan province, Iran

Central District (Baneh County) Persian: بخش مرکزی شهرستان بانه
- District
- Location within Iran Location within Iran Kurdistan
- Coordinates: 36°03′N 45°55′E
- Country: Iran
- Province: Kurdistan
- County: Baneh
- Capital: Baneh

Population (2016)
  - Total: 122,439
- Time zone: UTC+3:30 (IRST)

The Central District of Baneh County (Persian: بخش مرکزی شهرستان بانه) is in Kurdistan province, Iran. Its capital is the city of Baneh.

== Demographics ==
=== Population ===
At the time of the 2006 National Census, the district's population was 78,016 in 17,522 households. The following census in 2011 counted 96,243 people in 24,693 households. The 2016 census measured the population of the district as 122,439 inhabitants in 33,921 households.

=== Administrative divisions ===
Central District (Baneh County) Population
Administrative Divisions	2006	2011	2016
Shuy RD	8,381	11,053	12,221
Baneh (city)	69,635	85,190	110,218
Total	78,016	96,243	122,439
RD = Rural District
