= Bardeh Rash =

Bardeh Rash (Persian: برده رش) may refer to various places in Iran:

- Bardeh Rash, Baneh, Kurdistan
- Bardeh Rash, Bowalhasan, Baneh County, Kurdistan Province
- Bardeh Rash, Nameh Shir, Baneh County, Kurdistan Province
- Bardeh Rash, Divandarreh, Kurdistan
- Bardeh Rash, Saral, Divandarreh County, Kurdistan
- Bardeh Rash, Marivan, Kurdistan
- Bardeh Rash, West Azerbaijan
- Bardeh Rash-e Olya, Kermanshah Province
