= Sarkal =

Sarkal or Sar Kal (Persian: سركل) may refer to:

- Sarkal, Marivan
- Sarkal, Qorveh
- Sar Kal, Saqqez
- Sarkal Rural District, in Marivan County
