= Kani Kuzaleh =

Kani Kuzaleh كاني كوزله
- Village
- Location within Iran
- Coordinates: 35°31′22″N 46°17′43″E
- Country: Iran
- Province: Kurdistan
- County: Marivan
- Bakhsh: Central
- Rural District: Sarkal

Population (2006)
  - Total: 100
- Time zone: UTC+3:30 (IRST)
  - Summer (DST): UTC+4:30 (IRDT)

Kani Kuzaleh (Persian: كاني كوزله, also Romanized as Kānī Kūzaleh; also known as Kānī Kūrleh) is a village in Sarkal Rural District, in the Central District of Marivan County, Kurdistan Province, Iran. At the 2006 census, its population was 100, in 19 families. The village is populated by Kurds.
