= Jalileh =

Jalileh جليله
- Village
- Location within Iran
- Coordinates: 35°31′02″N 46°30′30″E
- Country: Iran
- Province: Kurdistan
- County: Marivan
- Bakhsh: Sarshiv
- Rural District: Gol-e Cheydar

Population (2006)
  - Total: 148
- Time zone: UTC+3:30 (IRST)
  - Summer (DST): UTC+4:30 (IRDT)

Jalileh (Persian: جليله, also Romanized as Jalīleh; also known as Jalile) is a village that is located in the Gol-e Cheydar Rural District, Sarshiv District, Marivan County, Kurdistan Province, Iran. At the 2006 census, its population was 148, in 32 families. The village is populated by Kurds.
