= Tut Sorkhan =

Tut Sorkhan توت سرخان
- Village
- Location within Iran
- Coordinates: 35°41′29″N 46°21′54″E
- Country: Iran
- Province: Kurdistan
- County: Marivan
- Bakhsh: Sarshiv
- Rural District: Sarshiv

Population (2006)
  - Total: 144
- Time zone: UTC+3:30 (IRST)
  - Summer (DST): UTC+4:30 (IRDT)

Tut Sorkhan (Persian: توت سرخان, also Romanized as Tūt Sorkhān) is a village in Sarshiv Rural District, Sarshiv District, Marivan County, Kurdistan Province, Iran. At the 2006 census, its population was 144, in 26 families. The village is populated by Kurds.
