= Kani Sanan =

Kani Sanan كاني سانان
- Village
- Location within Iran
- Coordinates: 35°30′42″N 46°06′33″E
- Country: Iran
- Province: Kurdistan
- County: Marivan
- Bakhsh: Central
- Rural District: Zarivar

Population (2006)
  - Total: 633
- Time zone: UTC+3:30 (IRST)
  - Summer (DST): UTC+4:30 (IRDT)

Kani Sanan (Persian: كاني سانان, also Romanized as Kānī Sānān) is a village in Zarivar Rural District, in the Central District of Marivan County, Kurdistan Province, Iran. At the 2006 census, its population was 633, in 138 families. The village is populated by Kurds.
