= Chali Sur =

Chali Sur چالي سور
- Village
- Location within Iran
- Coordinates: 35°37′40″N 46°21′09″E
- Country: Iran
- Province: Kurdistan
- County: Marivan
- Bakhsh: Sarshiv
- Rural District: Sarshiv

Population (2006)
  - Total: 196
- Time zone: UTC+3:30 (IRST)
  - Summer (DST): UTC+4:30 (IRDT)

Chali Sur (Persian: چالي سور, also Romanized as Chālī Sūr; also known as Chālīswar) is a village in Sarshiv Rural District, Sarshiv District, Marivan County, Kurdistan Province, Iran. At the 2006 census, its population was 196, in 43 families. The village is populated by Kurds.
