= Kal-e Sofla =

Kal-e Sofla كال سفلي
- Village
- Location within Iran
- Coordinates: 35°26′39″N 46°10′26″E
- Country: Iran
- Province: Kurdistan
- County: Marivan
- Bakhsh: Central
- Rural District: Zarivar

Population (2006)
  - Total: 260
- Time zone: UTC+3:30 (IRST)
  - Summer (DST): UTC+4:30 (IRDT)

Kal-e Sofla (Persian: كال سفلي, also Romanized as Kāl-e Soflá; also known as Gāl-e Pā’īn, Kal, and Kāl-e Pā’īn) is a village in Zarivar Rural District, in the Central District of Marivan County, Kurdistan Province, Iran. At the 2006 census, its population was 260, in 56 families. The village is populated by Kurds.
