= Darreh-ye Hard =

Darreh-ye Hard دره هرد
- Village
- Location within Iran
- Coordinates: 35°35′15″N 46°38′01″E
- Country: Iran
- Province: Kurdistan
- County: Marivan
- Bakhsh: Sarshiv
- Rural District: Gol-e Cheydar

Population (2006)
  - Total: 152
- Time zone: UTC+3:30 (IRST)
  - Summer (DST): UTC+4:30 (IRDT)

Darreh-ye Hard (Persian: دره هرد, also Romanized as Darreh Hard; also known as Darhard and Darreh Har) is a village in Gol-e Cheydar Rural District, Sarshiv District, Marivan County, Kurdistan Province, Iran. At the 2006 census, its population was 152, in 38 families. The village is populated by Kurds.
