= Sar Nezhmar =

Village in Kurdistan, Iran

Sar Nezhmar سرنژمار
- Village
- Location within Iran
- Coordinates: 35°25′07″N 46°12′30″E
- Country: Iran
- Province: Kurdistan
- County: Marivan
- Bakhsh: Central
- Rural District: Sarkal

Population (2006)
  - Total: 344
- Time zone: UTC+3:30 (IRST)
  - Summer (DST): UTC+4:30 (IRDT)

Sar Nezhmar (Persian: درگاشیخان, also Romanized as Dargashekhan, Dargahshekhan, and Dargashekhan; ) is a village in Sarkal Rural District, in the Central District of Marivan County, Kurdistan Province, Iran. At the 2006 census, its population was 510, in 120 families. The village is populated by Kurds.
