= Lanjabad =

Lanjabad or Lenjabad (Persian: لنج آباد) may refer to:

- Lanjabad, Ardabil
- Lenjabad, Marivan, Kurdistan Province
- Lenjabad, Sanandaj, Kurdistan Province
- Lanjabad, Lorestan
