= Neyzal =

Neyzal نيزل
- Village
- Location within Iran
- Coordinates: 35°21′49″N 46°28′42″E
- Country: Iran
- Province: Kurdistan
- County: Marivan
- Bakhsh: Central
- Rural District: Kumasi

Population (2006)
  - Total: 222
- Time zone: UTC+3:30 (IRST)
  - Summer (DST): UTC+4:30 (IRDT)
- Area code: 42

Neyzal (Persian: نيزل, also Romanized as Nīzal and Nīzel) is a village in Kumasi Rural District, in the Central District of Marivan County, Kurdistan Province, Iran. At the 2006 census, its population was 222, in 55 families. The village is populated by Kurds.
