= Tutun Darreh =

Tutun Darreh توتوندره
- Village
- Location within Iran
- Coordinates: 35°25′07″N 46°10′17″E
- Country: Iran
- Province: Kurdistan
- County: Marivan
- Bakhsh: Central
- Rural District: Sarkal

Population (2006)
  - Total: 214
- Time zone: UTC+3:30 (IRST)
  - Summer (DST): UTC+4:30 (IRDT)

Tutun Darreh (Persian: توتوندره, also Romanized as Tūtūn Darreh; also known as Tūtūndar and Tūtūn Dar) is a village in Sarkal Rural District, in the Central District of Marivan County, Kurdistan Province, Iran. At the 2006 census, its population was 214, in 40 families. The village is populated by Kurds.
