= Hasan Qareh =

Village in Kurdistan, Iran

Hasan Qareh حسن قره
- Village
- Location within Iran
- Coordinates: 35°31′41″N 46°26′54″E
- Country: Iran
- Province: Kurdistan
- County: Marivan
- Bakhsh: Sarshiv
- Rural District: Gol-e Cheydar

Population (2006)
  - Total: 100
- Time zone: UTC+3:30 (IRST)
  - Summer (DST): UTC+4:30 (IRDT)

Hasan Qareh (Persian: حسن قره, also Romanized as Ḩasan Qareh and Hasan Qarah; also known as Hasan Gara and Hasan Qara) is a village in Gol-e Cheydar Rural District, Sarshiv District, Marivan County, Kurdistan Province, Iran. At the 2006 census, its population was 100, in 21 families. The village is populated by Kurds.
