= Baba, Iran =

Baba بابا
- Village
- Location within Iran
- Coordinates: 35°29′20″N 46°31′00″E
- Country: Iran
- Province: Kurdistan
- County: Marivan
- Bakhsh: Sarshiv
- Rural District: Gol-e Cheydar

Population (2006)
  - Total: 58
- Time zone: UTC+3:30 (IRST)
  - Summer (DST): UTC+4:30 (IRDT)

Baba (Persian: بابا, also Romanized as Bābā; also known as Bāra, Bārah, Bāveh, and Bāwa) is a village in Gol-e Cheydar Rural District, Sarshiv District, Marivan County, Kurdistan Province, Iran. At the 2006 census, its population was 58, in 13 families. The village is populated by Kurds.
