= Qamishaleh, Marivan =

Qamishaleh قاميشله
- Village
- Location within Iran
- Coordinates: 35°40′41″N 46°16′01″E
- Country: Iran
- Province: Kurdistan
- County: Marivan
- Bakhsh: Sarshiv
- Rural District: Sarshiv

Population (2006)
  - Total: 221
- Time zone: UTC+3:30 (IRST)
  - Summer (DST): UTC+4:30 (IRDT)

Qamishaleh (Persian: قاميشله, also Romanized as Qāmīshaleh, Qāmī Sheleh, and Qāmīshleh) is a village in Sarshiv Rural District, Sarshiv District, Marivan County, Kurdistan Province, Iran. At the 2006 census, its population was 221, in 43 families. The village is populated by Kurds.
