= Naneh =

Naneh ننه
- Village
- Location within Iran
- Coordinates: 35°25′12″N 46°18′09″E
- Country: Iran
- Province: Kurdistan
- County: Marivan
- Bakhsh: Central
- Rural District: Sarkal

Population (2006)
  - Total: 516
- Time zone: UTC+3:30 (IRST)
  - Summer (DST): UTC+4:30 (IRDT)

Naneh (Persian: ننه; also known as Nehneh) is a village in Sarkal Rural District, in the Central District of Marivan County, Kurdistan Province, Iran. At the 2006 census, its population was 516, in 125 families. The village is populated by Kurds.
