= Kal-e Olya =

Kal-e Olya كال عليا
- Village
- Location within Iran
- Coordinates: 35°25′58″N 46°09′45″E
- Country: Iran
- Province: Kurdistan
- County: Marivan
- Bakhsh: Central
- Rural District: Zarivar

Population (2006)
  - Total: 245
- Time zone: UTC+3:30 (IRST)
  - Summer (DST): UTC+4:30 (IRDT)

Kal-e Olya (Persian: كال عليا, also Romanized as Kāl-e ‘Olyā; also known as Gāl-e Bālā, Kāl-e Bālā, and Kal Vaiseh) is a village in Zarivar Rural District, in the Central District of Marivan County, Kurdistan Province, Iran. At the 2006 census, its population was 245, in 54 families. The village is populated by Kurds.
