= Kalkeh Jan =

Kalkeh Jan كلكه جان
- Village
- Location within Iran
- Coordinates: 35°28′19″N 46°08′46″E
- Country: Iran
- Province: Kurdistan
- County: Marivan
- Bakhsh: Central
- Rural District: Zarivar

Population (2006)
  - Total: 194
- Time zone: UTC+3:30 (IRST)
  - Summer (DST): UTC+4:30 (IRDT)

Kalkeh Jan (Persian: كلكه جان, also Romanized as Kalkeh Jān; also known as Kalgeh Jān, Kalkajān, Kalkeh Jār, Kelak Jān, and Qalleh Jam) is a village in Zarivar Rural District, in the Central District of Marivan County, Kurdistan Province, Iran. At the 2006 census, its population was 194, in 42 families. The village is populated by Kurds.
