= Hang-e Zhaleh =

Hang-e Zhaleh هنگ ژاله
- Village
- Location within Iran
- Coordinates: 35°26′56″N 46°26′46″E
- Country: Iran
- Province: Kurdistan
- County: Marivan
- Bakhsh: Central
- Rural District: Kumasi

Population (2006)
  - Total: 63
- Time zone: UTC+3:30 (IRST)
  - Summer (DST): UTC+4:30 (IRDT)

Hang-e Zhaleh (Persian: هنگ ژاله, also Romanized as Hang-e Zhāleh and Hangzhālah; also known as Hangeh Zhāleh, Hangzāla, and Hangzāleh) is a village in Kumasi Rural District, in the Central District of Marivan County, Kurdistan Province, Iran. At the 2006 census, its population was 63, in 17 families. The village is populated by Kurds.
