= Kureh Darreh =

Kureh Darreh كوره دره
- Village
- Location within Iran
- Coordinates: 35°27′48″N 46°25′52″E
- Country: Iran
- Province: Kurdistan
- County: Marivan
- Bakhsh: Central
- Rural District: Kumasi

Population (2006)
  - Total: 306
- Time zone: UTC+3:30 (IRST)
  - Summer (DST): UTC+4:30 (IRDT)

Kureh Darreh (Persian: كوره دره, also Romanized as Kūreh Darreh; also known as Khūreh Darreh and Kūrdarreh) is a village in Kumasi Rural District, in the Central District of Marivan County, Kurdistan Province, Iran. At the 2006 census, its population was 306, in 68 families. The village is populated by Kurds.
