= Mulinan =

Mulinan مولينان
- Village
- Location within Iran
- Coordinates: 35°26′50″N 46°29′16″E
- Country: Iran
- Province: Kurdistan
- County: Marivan
- Bakhsh: Central
- Rural District: Kumasi

Population (2006)
  - Total: 154
- Time zone: UTC+3:30 (IRST)
  - Summer (DST): UTC+4:30 (IRDT)

Mulinan (Persian: مولينان, also Romanized as Mūlīnān) is a village in Kumasi Rural District, in the Central District of Marivan County, Kurdistan Province, Iran. At the 2006 census, its population was 154, in 32 families. The village is populated by Kurds.
