= Gol-e Cheydar =

Gol-e Cheydar گلچيدر
- Village
- Location within Iran
- Coordinates: 35°39′54″N 46°31′10″E
- Country: Iran
- Province: Kurdistan
- County: Marivan
- Bakhsh: Sarshiv
- Rural District: Gol-e Cheydar

Population (2006)
  - Total: 302
- Time zone: UTC+3:30 (IRST)
  - Summer (DST): UTC+4:30 (IRDT)

Gol-e Cheydar (Persian: گلچيدر, also Romanized as Golchīdar) is a village in Gol-e Cheydar Rural District, Sarshiv District, Marivan County, Kurdistan Province, Iran. At the 2006 census, its population was 302, in 56 families. The village is populated by Kurds.
