= Guricheh =

Guricheh گوريچه
- Village
- Location within Iran
- Coordinates: 35°36′45″N 46°39′23″E
- Country: Iran
- Province: Kurdistan
- County: Marivan
- Bakhsh: Sarshiv
- Rural District: Gol-e Cheydar

Population (2006)
  - Total: 64
- Time zone: UTC+3:30 (IRST)
  - Summer (DST): UTC+4:30 (IRDT)

Guricheh (Persian: گوريچه, also Romanized as Gūrīcheh; also known as Qūrīcheh) is a village in Gol-e Cheydar Rural District, Sarshiv District, Marivan County, Kurdistan Province, Iran. At the 2006 census, its population was 64, in 14 families. The village is populated by Kurds.
