= Kulan (disambiguation) =

The kulan (Turkmenian kulan, Equus hemionus kulan), is a wild ass.

Kulan may also refer to:

- Kulan, East Azerbaijan, Iran
- Kulan, Kermanshah, Iran
- Kulan, Kurdistan, Iran
- Kulan, Kumasi, Kurdistan Province, Iran
- Kulan, Lorestan, Iran
- Kulan, Kazakhstan, the capital town of the Turar Ryskulov District
- Kulan Gath, a fictional character in several Marvel comics

== See also ==
- Khulan (disambiguation)
- Kolan (disambiguation)
