= Belcheh Sur =

Belcheh Sur بلچه سور
- Village
- Location within Iran
- Coordinates: 35°25′06″N 46°24′50″E
- Country: Iran
- Province: Kurdistan
- County: Marivan
- Bakhsh: Central
- Rural District: Kumasi

Population (2006)
  - Total: 268
- Time zone: UTC+3:30 (IRST)
  - Summer (DST): UTC+4:30 (IRDT)

Belcheh Sur (Persian: بلچه سور, also Romanized as Belcheh Sūr; also known as Belīcheh Sūr, Bīlcheh Sar, Bīlcheh Sūr, and Bilchehsūr) is a village in Kumasi Rural District, in the Central District of Marivan County, Kurdistan Province, Iran. At the 2006 census, its population was 268, in 61 families. The village is populated by Kurds.
