= Volahzhir =

Volahzhir وله ژير
- Village
- Location within Iran
- Coordinates: 35°27′50″N 46°09′01″E
- Country: Iran
- Province: Kurdistan
- County: Marivan
- Bakhsh: Central
- Rural District: Zarivar

Population (2006)
  - Total: 1,651
- Time zone: UTC+3:30 (IRST)
  - Summer (DST): UTC+4:30 (IRDT)

Volahzhir (Persian: وله ژير, also Romanized as Volahzhīr, Valeh Zhīr, and Voleh Zhīr; also known as Valezhīr, Volazher, Voleḩzīr, Volzhīr, and Walehzīr) is a village in Zarivar Rural District, in the Central District of Marivan County, Kurdistan Province, Iran. At the 2006 census, its population was 1,651, in 366 families. The village is populated by Kurds.
