= Kaku Zakaria =

Kaku Zakaria كاكوذكريا
- Village
- Location within Iran
- Coordinates: 35°32′02″N 46°38′15″E
- Country: Iran
- Province: Kurdistan
- County: Marivan
- Bakhsh: Sarshiv
- Rural District: Gol-e Cheydar

Population (2006)
  - Total: 155
- Time zone: UTC+3:30 (IRST)
  - Summer (DST): UTC+4:30 (IRDT)

Kaku Zakaria (Persian: كاكوذكريا, also Romanized as Kākū Z̄akarīyā and Kākū Zakarīā; also known as Kākūs Kārī, Kākū Zakareyān, and Kākūz Qariya) is a village in Gol-e Cheydar Rural District, Sarshiv District, Marivan County, Kurdistan Province, Iran. At the 2006 census, its population was 155, in 38 families. The village is populated by Kurds.
