= Kulit-e Hoseynabad =

Kulit-e Hoseynabad كوليت حسين آباد
- Village
- Location within Iran
- Coordinates: 35°32′38″N 46°20′17″E
- Country: Iran
- Province: Kurdistan
- County: Marivan
- Bakhsh: Sarshiv
- Rural District: Sarshiv

Population (2006)
  - Total: 108
- Time zone: UTC+3:30 (IRST)
  - Summer (DST): UTC+4:30 (IRDT)

Kulit-e Hoseynabad (Persian: كوليت حسين آباد, also Romanized as Kūlīt-e Ḩoseynābād; also known as Kūlīt) is a village in Sarshiv Rural District, Sarshiv District, Marivan County, Kurdistan Province, Iran. At the 2006 census, its population was 108, in 23 families. The village is populated by Kurds.
