= Hasan Owleh =

Hasan Owleh حسن اوله
- Village
- Location within Iran
- Coordinates: 35°32′30″N 46°14′08″E
- Country: Iran
- Province: Kurdistan
- County: Marivan
- Bakhsh: Central
- Rural District: Sarkal

Population (2006)
  - Total: 273
- Time zone: UTC+3:30 (IRST)
  - Summer (DST): UTC+4:30 (IRDT)

Hasan Owleh (Persian: حسن اوله, also Romanized as Ḩasan Owleh, Hasan Aūleh, Ḩasan Āvleh, and Ḩassan Avleh; also known as Āvleh Ḩasan) is a village in Sarkal Rural District, in the Central District of Marivan County, Kurdistan Province, Iran. At the 2006 census, its population was 273, in 60 families. The village is populated by Kurds.
