= Gomareh Lang =

Gomareh Lang گماره لنگ
- Village
- Location within Iran
- Coordinates: 35°34′51″N 46°17′41″E
- Country: Iran
- Province: Kurdistan
- County: Marivan
- Bakhsh: Sarshiv
- Rural District: Sarshiv

Population (2006)
  - Total: 331
- Time zone: UTC+3:30 (IRST)
  - Summer (DST): UTC+4:30 (IRDT)

Gomareh Lang (Persian: گماره لنگ, also Romanized as Gomāreh Lang; also known as Gomāralang, Gomār Lang, and Gumār-i-Lang) is a village in Sarshiv Rural District, Sarshiv District, Marivan County, Kurdistan Province, Iran. At the 2006 census, its population was 331, in 70 families. The village is populated by Kurds.
