= Masidar-e Sofla =

Masidar-e Sofla ماسيدرسفلي
- Village
- Location within Iran
- Coordinates: 35°34′54″N 46°19′56″E
- Country: Iran
- Province: Kurdistan
- County: Marivan
- Bakhsh: Sarshiv
- Rural District: Sarshiv

Population (2006)
  - Total: 295
- Time zone: UTC+3:30 (IRST)
  - Summer (DST): UTC+4:30 (IRDT)

Masidar-e Sofla (Persian: ماسيدرسفلي, also Romanized as Māsīdar-e Soflá; also known as Māsīdar and Māsīdar-e Pā’īn) is a village in Sarshiv Rural District, Sarshiv District, Marivan County, Kurdistan Province, Iran. At the 2006 census, its population was 295, in 53 families. The village is populated by Kurds.
