= Deh Bonyad =

Deh Bonyad ده بنياد
- Village
- Location within Iran
- Coordinates: 35°34′09″N 46°35′05″E
- Country: Iran
- Province: Kurdistan
- County: Marivan
- Bakhsh: Sarshiv
- Rural District: Gol-e Cheydar

Population (2006)
  - Total: 173
- Time zone: UTC+3:30 (IRST)
  - Summer (DST): UTC+4:30 (IRDT)

Deh Bonyad (Persian: ده بنياد, also Romanized as Deh Bonyād and Deh-e Bonyād) is a village in Gol-e Cheydar Rural District, Sarshiv District, Marivan County, Kurdistan Province, Iran. At the 2006 census, its population was 173, in 40 families. The village is populated by Kurds.
