= Buolhasan =

Buolhasan or Bowalhasan or Bu ol Hasan (Persian: بوالحسن), also rendered as Bolhasan, may refer to:

- Buolhasan, Ilam
- Bowalhasan, Kurdistan
- Bowalhasan Rural District, in Kurdistan Province
