= Bardeh Rasheh =

Bardeh Rasheh or Bardah Rashah (Persian: برده رشه) may refer to:

- Bardeh Rasheh, Baneh
- Bardeh Rasheh, Marivan
- Bardeh Rasheh, Sarshiv, Marivan County
- Bardeh Rasheh, Saqqez
