= Surkul =

Surkul سوركول
- Village
- Location within Iran
- Coordinates: 35°23′00″N 46°30′00″E
- Country: Iran
- Province: Kurdistan
- County: Marivan
- Bakhsh: Central
- Rural District: Kumasi

Population (2006)
  - Total: 324
- Time zone: UTC+3:30 (IRST)
  - Summer (DST): UTC+4:30 (IRDT)

Surkul (Persian: سوركول, also Romanized as Sūrkūl) is a village in Kumasi Rural District, in the Central District of Marivan County, Kurdistan Province, Iran. At the 2006 census, its population was 324, in 72 families. The village is populated by Kurds.
