= Kaleh Yunjeh =

Kaleh Yunjeh كله يونجه
- Village
- Location within Iran
- Coordinates: 35°30′59″N 46°19′34″E
- Country: Iran
- Province: Kurdistan
- County: Marivan
- Bakhsh: Central
- Rural District: Sarkal

Population (2006)
  - Total: 239
- Time zone: UTC+3:30 (IRST)
  - Summer (DST): UTC+4:30 (IRDT)

Kaleh Yunjeh (Persian: كله يونجه, also Romanized as Kaleh Yūnjeh and Kalleh Yownjeh; also known as Galeh Yownjeh, Gol-e Yownjeh, Kalah Venjah, Kaleh Vīnjeh, Kaleh Yonjeh, Kal-e Yownjeh, Kalīvanjeh, and Kalīwanjeh) is a village in Sarkal Rural District, in the Central District of Marivan County, Kurdistan Province, Iran. At the 2006 census, its population was 239, in 49 families. The village is populated by Kurds.
