= Darzian =

Darzian درزيان
- Village
- Location within Iran
- Coordinates: 35°26′53″N 46°12′42″E
- Country: Iran
- Province: Kurdistan
- County: Marivan
- Bakhsh: Central
- Rural District: Sarkal

Population (2006)
  - Total: 489
- Time zone: UTC+3:30 (IRST)
  - Summer (DST): UTC+4:30 (IRDT)

Darzian (Persian: درزيان, also Romanized as Darzīān, Dar-i-Ziyān, Darzeyān, and Darzyān; also known as Darīzīān) is a village in Sarkal Rural District, in the Central District of Marivan County, Kurdistan Province, Iran. At the 2006 census, its population was 489, in 97 families. The village is populated by Kurds.
