= Veyseh =

Veyseh ويسه
- Village
- Location within Iran
- Coordinates: 35°25′46″N 46°08′11″E
- Country: Iran
- Province: Kurdistan
- County: Marivan
- Bakhsh: Central
- Rural District: Zarivar

Population (2006)
  - Total: 825
- Time zone: UTC+3:30 (IRST)
  - Summer (DST): UTC+4:30 (IRDT)

Veyseh (Persian: ويسه, also Romanized as Vayseh and Vaiseh; also known as Gharb Veyseh and Vīzeh) is a village in Zarivar Rural District, in the Central District of Marivan County, Kurdistan Province, Iran. At the 2006 census, its population was 825, in 180 families. The village is populated by Kurds.
