= Shahrak-e Hejrat, Kurdistan =

Neighborhood in Kurdistan province, Iran

Shahrak-e Hejrat Persian: شهرك هجرت
- Neighborhood
- Location within Iran Location within Iran Kurdistan
- Coordinates: 35°28′24″N 46°11′46″E
- Country: Iran
- Province: Kurdistan
- County: Marivan
- District: Central
- City: Kani Dinar

Population (2006)
  - Total: 4,441
- Time zone: UTC+3:30 (IRST)

Shahrak-e Hejrat (Persian: شهرك هجرت) is a neighborhood in the city of Kani Dinar in the Central District of Marivan County, Kurdistan province, Iran.

== Demographics ==
=== Ethnicity ===
The village is populated by Kurds.

=== Population ===
At the time of the 2006 National Census, Shahrak-e Hejrat's population was 4,441 in 1,082 households, when it was a village in Sarkal Rural District.

After the census, Shahrak-e Hejrat merged with the village of Kani Dinar to form the city of Kani Dinar
