= Vanineh-ye Sofla =

Vanineh-ye Sofla ونينه سفلي
- Village
- Location within Iran
- Coordinates: 35°28′25″N 46°27′18″E
- Country: Iran
- Province: Kurdistan
- County: Marivan
- Bakhsh: Central
- Rural District: Kumasi

Population (2006)
  - Total: 176
- Time zone: UTC+3:30 (IRST)
  - Summer (DST): UTC+4:30 (IRDT)

Vanineh-ye Sofla (Persian: ونينه سفلي, also Romanized as Vanīneh-ye Soflá; also known as Vanaineh Sufla, Vanenah-e Pā’īn, Vanineh Sofla, Vanīneh-ye Pā’īn, Voneyneh-ye Pā’īn, and Voneyneh-ye Soflá) is a village in Kumasi Rural District, in the Central District of Marivan County, Kurdistan Province, Iran. At the 2006 census, its population was 176, in 36 families. The village is populated by Kurds.
