= Kani Pezmakeh =

Kani Pezmakeh كاني پزمكه
- Village
- Location within Iran
- Coordinates: 36°04′57″N 45°42′12″E
- Country: Iran
- Province: Kurdistan
- County: Baneh
- Bakhsh: Namshir
- Rural District: Nameh Shir

Population (2006)
  - Total: 80
- Time zone: UTC+3:30 (IRST)
  - Summer (DST): UTC+4:30 (IRDT)

Kani Pezmakeh (Persian: كاني پزمكه, also Romanized as Kānī Pezmakeh; also known as Kānī Pīzmakeh) is a village in Nameh Shir Rural District, Namshir District, Baneh County, Kurdistan Province, Iran. At the 2006 census, its population was 80, in 20 families. The village is populated by Kurds.
