= Geleh, Kurdistan =

Geleh گله
- Village
- Location within Iran
- Coordinates: 35°35′57″N 46°23′45″E
- Country: Iran
- Province: Kurdistan
- County: Marivan
- Bakhsh: Sarshiv
- Rural District: Sarshiv

Population (2006)
  - Total: 316
- Time zone: UTC+3:30 (IRST)
  - Summer (DST): UTC+4:30 (IRDT)

Geleh (Persian: گله; also known as Gileh) is a village in Sarshiv Rural District, Sarshiv District, Marivan County, Kurdistan Province, Iran. At the 2006 census, its population was 316, in 77 families. The village is populated by Kurds.
