= Neshkash =

Neshkash نشكاش
- Village
- Location within Iran
- Coordinates: 35°29′48″N 46°20′45″E
- Country: Iran
- Province: Kurdistan
- County: Marivan
- Bakhsh: Central
- Rural District: Sarkal

Population (2006)
  - Total: 245
- Time zone: UTC+3:30 (IRST)
  - Summer (DST): UTC+4:30 (IRDT)

Neshkash (Persian: نشكاش, also Romanized as Neshkāsh; also known as Neshkān and Nishkāsh) is a village in Sarkal Rural District, in the Central District of Marivan County, Kurdistan Province, Iran. At the 2006 census, its population was 245, in 57 families. The village is populated by Kurds.
