= Vanineh =

Vanineh or Vanaineh or Voneyneh (Persian: ونينه), also rendered as Vanenah, may refer to:

- Vanineh-ye Olya
- Vanineh-ye Sofla
