= Gugjeh =

Village in Kurdistan province, Iran

Gugjeh Persian: گوگجه
- Village
- Location within Iran Location within Iran Kurdistan
- Coordinates: 35°45′00″N 46°29′18″E
- Country: Iran
- Province: Kurdistan
- County: Marivan
- District: Sarshiv
- Rural District: Sarshiv

Population (2016)
  - Total: 336
- Time zone: UTC+3:30 (IRST)

Gugjeh (Persian: گوگجه) (Note: Also romanized as Gowgjeh and Gūgjeh; also known as Gogjeh, Gowg Tappeh, and Gowjeh) is a village in Sarshiv Rural District of Sarshiv District, Marivan County, Kurdistan province, Iran.

== Demographics ==
=== Ethnicity ===
The village is populated by Kurds.

=== Population ===
At the time of the 2006 National Census, the village's population was 383 in 74 households. The following census in 2011 counted 345 people in 80 households. The 2016 census measured the population of the village as 336 people in 96 households. It was the most populous village in its rural district.
