= Geleyeh =

Village in Kurdistan province, Iran

Geleyeh Persian: گليه
- Village
- Location within Iran Location within Iran Kurdistan
- Coordinates: 35°22′12″N 46°26′37″E
- Country: Iran
- Province: Kurdistan
- County: Marivan
- District: Central
- Rural District: Kumasi

Population (2016)
  - Total: 479
- Time zone: UTC+3:30 (IRST)

Geleyeh (Persian: گليه) (Note: Also romanized as Galyeh, Gelīyeh, and Gelyeh; also known as Giliyeh) is a village in Kumasi Rural District of the Central District of Marivan County, Kurdistan province, Iran.

== Demographics ==
=== Ethnicity ===
The village is populated by Kurds.

=== Population ===
At the time of the 2006 National Census, the village's population was 814 in 190 households. The following census in 2011 counted 598 people in 163 households. The 2016 census measured the population of the village as 479 people in 153 households. It was the most populous village in its rural district.
