= Doveyseh =

Doveyseh or Dow Veyseh or Dow Viseh (Persian: دويسه) may refer to:

- Doveyseh, Marivan
- Doveyseh, Sanandaj
