= Zarvav =

Zarvav (Persian: زرواو), also known as Zarvar, may refer to:

- Zarvav-e Olya
- Zarvav-e Sofla
