= Salasi Olya =

Salasi Olya سلسي عليا
- Village
- Location within Iran
- Coordinates: 35°33′50″N 46°12′08″E
- Country: Iran
- Province: Kurdistan
- County: Marivan
- Bakhsh: Central
- Rural District: Sarkal

Population (2006)
  - Total: 339
- Time zone: UTC+3:30 (IRST)
  - Summer (DST): UTC+4:30 (IRDT)

Salasi Olya (Persian: سلسي عليا, also Romanized as Salasī ‘Olya; also known as S̄alās̄eh, Salasī-e Bozorg, and Salasī-ye Bozorg) is a village in Sarkal Rural District, in the Central District of Marivan County, Kurdistan Province, Iran. At the 2006 census, its population was 339, in 65 families. The village is populated by Kurds.
