= Janvareh-ye Khvarag =

Village in Kurdistan province, Iran

Janvareh-ye Khvarag Persian: جانوره خوارگ
- Village
- Location within Iran Location within Iran Kurdistan
- Coordinates: 35°31′32″N 46°33′36″E
- Country: Iran
- Province: Kurdistan
- County: Marivan
- District: Sarshiv
- Rural District: Gol-e Cheydar

Population (2016)
  - Total: 909
- Time zone: UTC+3:30 (IRST)

Janvareh-ye Khvarag (Persian: جانوره خوارگ) (Note: Also romanized as Jānvareh-ye Khvārag) is a village in, and the capital of, Gol-e Cheydar Rural District of Sarshiv District, Marivan County, Kurdistan province, Iran.

== Demographics ==
=== Ethnicity ===
The village is populated by Kurds.

=== Population ===
At the time of the 2006 National Census, the village's population was 994 in 233 households. The following census in 2011 counted 1,186 people in 260 households. The 2016 census measured the population of the village as 909 people in 237 households. It was the most populous village in its rural district.
