= Galan, Kurdistan =

Galan گلان
- Village
- Location within Iran
- Coordinates: 35°25′50″N 46°26′12″E
- Country: Iran
- Province: Kurdistan
- County: Marivan
- Bakhsh: Central
- Rural District: Kumasi

Population (2006)
  - Total: 164
- Time zone: UTC+3:30 (IRST)
  - Summer (DST): UTC+4:30 (IRDT)

Galan (Persian: گلان, also Romanized as Galān and Golān; also known as Gulān and Kūlān) is a village in Kumasi Rural District, in the Central District of Marivan County, Kurdistan Province, Iran. At the 2006 census, its population was 164, in 37 families. The village is populated by Kurds.
