= Bardeh Sefid =

Bardeh Sefid or Bardeh Safid (Persian: برده سفيد) may refer to:

- Bardeh Sefid, Divandarreh
- Bardeh Sefid, Marivan
