= Doveyseh, Marivan =

Doveyseh دويسه
- Village
- Location within Iran
- Coordinates: 35°36′41″N 46°18′21″E
- Country: Iran
- Province: Kurdistan
- County: Marivan
- Bakhsh: Sarshiv
- Rural District: Sarshiv

Population (2006)
  - Total: 375
- Time zone: UTC+3:30 (IRST)
  - Summer (DST): UTC+4:30 (IRDT)

Doveyseh (Persian: دويسه) is a village in Sarshiv Rural District, Sarshiv District, Marivan County, Kurdistan Province, Iran. At the 2006 census, its population was 375, in 82 families. It is in the western part of Iran, near the border with Iraq. The village is populated by Kurds.
