= Sarkal, Marivan =

Sarkal سركل
- Village
- Location within Iran
- Coordinates: 35°27′50″N 46°15′41″E
- Country: Iran
- Province: Kurdistan
- County: Marivan
- Bakhsh: Central
- Rural District: Sarkal

Population (2006)
  - Total: 123
- Time zone: UTC+3:30 (IRST)
  - Summer (DST): UTC+4:30 (IRDT)

Sarkal (Persian: سركل) is a village in Sarkal Rural District, in the Central District of Marivan County, Kurdistan Province, Iran. At the 2006 census, its population was 123, in 27 families. The village is populated by Kurds.
