= Askol-e Sofla =

Askol-e Sofla اسکل سفلی
- village
- Location within Iran
- Coordinates: 35°28′03″N 46°03′46″E
- Country: Iran
- Province: Kurdistan
- County: Marivan
- Bakhsh: Central
- Rural District: Zarivar

Population (2006)
  - Total: 616
- Time zone: UTC+3:30 (IRST)
  - Summer (DST): UTC+4:30 (IRDT)

Askol-e Sofla (Persian: اسکل سفلی, Sorani Kurdish: ئەسکۆڵی خواروو, also Romanized as Askol-e Soflá and Askol-e Khwaru; also known as Askol-e Pā’īn) is a village in Zarivar Rural District, in the Central District of Marivan County, Kurdistan Province, Iran. At the 2006 census, its population was 616, in 134 families. The village is populated by Kurds.
