= Sharani, Iran =

Sharani شاراني
- Village
- Location within Iran
- Coordinates: 35°26′31″N 46°15′54″E
- Country: Iran
- Province: Kurdistan
- County: Marivan
- Bakhsh: Central
- Rural District: Sarkal

Population (2006)
  - Total: 537
- Time zone: UTC+3:30 (IRST)
  - Summer (DST): UTC+4:30 (IRDT)

Sharani (Persian: شاراني, also Romanized as Shārānī; also known as Shahrāneh, Shahrānī and Shehrāneh) is a village in Sarkal Rural District, in the Central District of Marivan County, Kurdistan Province, Iran. At the 2006 census, its population was 537, in 115 families. The village is populated by Kurds.
