= Sianav, Marivan =

Sianav سياناو
- Village
- Location within Iran
- Coordinates: 35°27′11″N 46°04′50″E
- Country: Iran
- Province: Kurdistan
- County: Marivan
- Bakhsh: Central
- Rural District: Zarivar

Population (2006)
  - Total: 789
- Time zone: UTC+3:30 (IRST)
  - Summer (DST): UTC+4:30 (IRDT)

Sianav (Persian: سياناو, also Romanized as Sīānāv and Seyānāv; also known as Seanao, Sīāh Nāv, Sīnā’ū, and Siyā Nāv) is a village in Zarivar Rural District, in the Central District of Marivan County, Kurdistan Province, Iran. At the 2006 census, its population was 789, in 161 families. The village is populated by Kurds.
