= Shahidar =

Shahidar شاهيدر
- Village
- Location within Iran
- Coordinates: 35°26′57″N 46°31′29″E
- Country: Iran
- Province: Kurdistan
- County: Marivan
- Bakhsh: Central
- Rural District: Kumasi

Population (2006)
  - Total: 433
- Time zone: UTC+3:30 (IRST)
  - Summer (DST): UTC+4:30 (IRDT)

Shahidar (Persian: شاهيدر, also Romanized as Shāhīdar; also known as Shāyar, Shāyer, and Sha-yi-Dar) is a village in Kumasi Rural District, in the Central District of Marivan County, Kurdistan Province, Iran. At the 2006 census, its population was 433, in 93 families. The village is populated by Kurds.
