= Gashkaseh =

Gashkaseh گشكسه
- Village
- Location within Iran
- Coordinates: 36°06′05″N 45°43′46″E
- Country: Iran
- Province: Kurdistan
- County: Baneh
- Bakhsh: Namshir
- Rural District: Nameh Shir

Population (2006)
  - Total: 232
- Time zone: UTC+3:30 (IRST)
  - Summer (DST): UTC+4:30 (IRDT)

Gashkaseh (Persian: گشكسه; also known as Kashkaseh) is a village in Nameh Shir Rural District, Namshir District, Baneh County, Kurdistan Province, Iran. At the 2006 census, its population was 232, in 36 families. The village is populated by Kurds.
