= Darreh Panbehdan, Marivan =

Darreh Panbehdan دره پنبه دان
- Village
- Location within Iran
- Coordinates: 35°35′52″N 46°20′48″E
- Country: Iran
- Province: Kurdistan
- County: Marivan
- Bakhsh: Sarshiv
- Rural District: Sarshiv

Population (2006)
  - Total: 25
- Time zone: UTC+3:30 (IRST)
  - Summer (DST): UTC+4:30 (IRDT)

Darreh Panbehdan (Persian: دره پنبه دان, also Romanized as Darreh Panbehdān) is a village in Sarshiv Rural District, Sarshiv District, Marivan County, Kurdistan Province, Iran. At the 2006 census, its population was 25, in 6 families. The village is populated by Kurds.
