= Lenjabad, Marivan =

Lenjabad لنج آباد
- Village
- Location within Iran
- Coordinates: 35°30′34″N 46°13′58″E
- Country: Iran
- Province: Kurdistan
- County: Marivan
- Bakhsh: Central
- Rural District: Sarkal

Population (2006)
  - Total: 688
- Time zone: UTC+3:30 (IRST)
  - Summer (DST): UTC+4:30 (IRDT)

Lenjabad (Persian: لنج آباد, also Romanized as Lenjābād and Lanjābād) is a village in Sarkal Rural District, in the Central District of Marivan County, Kurdistan Province, Iran. At the 2006 census, its population was 688, in 138 families. The village is populated by Kurds.
