= Anjineh-ye Ebrahim =

Anjineh-ye Ebrahim (Persian: انجينه ابراهيم) may refer to:

- Anjineh-ye Ebrahim-e Jonubi
- Anjineh-ye Ebrahim-e Shomali
