= Tazehabad, Marivan =

Village in Kurdistan province, Iran

Tazehabad Persian: تازه آباد
- Village
- Location within Iran Location within Iran Kurdistan
- Coordinates: 35°31′37″N 46°13′05″E
- Country: Iran
- Province: Kurdistan
- County: Marivan
- District: Central
- Rural District: Sarkal

Population (2016)
  - Total: 2,539
- Time zone: UTC+3:30 (IRST)

Tazehabad (Persian: تازه آباد) (Note: Also romanized as Tāzehābād) is a village in Sarkal Rural District of the Central District of Marivan County, Kurdistan province, Iran.

== Demographics ==
=== Ethnicity ===
The village is populated by Kurds.

=== Population ===
At the time of the 2006 National Census, the village's population was 593 in 129 households. The following census in 2011 counted 1,431 people in 367 households. The 2016 census measured the population of the village as 2,539 people in 683 households. It was the most populous village in its rural district.
