= Shahinan =

Shahinan شهينان
- Village
- Location within Iran
- Coordinates: 36°09′49″N 45°47′33″E
- Country: Iran
- Province: Kurdistan
- County: Baneh
- Bakhsh: Namshir
- Rural District: Nameh Shir

Population (2006)
  - Total: 152
- Time zone: UTC+3:30 (IRST)
  - Summer (DST): UTC+4:30 (IRDT)

Shahinan (Persian: شهينان, also Romanized as Shahīnān) is a village in Nameh Shir Rural District, Namshir District, Baneh County, Kurdistan Province, Iran. At the 2006 census, its population was 152, in 24 families. The village is populated by Kurds.
