= Chavelkan =

Chavelkan or Chavalkan or Chavlakan or Chawalakan (Persian: چاولكان), also rendered as Chabalkan or Chabolkan or Chabolakan, may refer to:

- Chavelkan-e Hajji
- Chavelkan-e Vazir
