= Vanineh-ye Olya =

Vanineh-ye Olya ونينه عليا
- Village
- Location within Iran
- Coordinates: 35°29′21″N 46°27′59″E
- Country: Iran
- Province: Kurdistan
- County: Marivan
- Bakhsh: Central
- Rural District: Kumasi

Population (2006)
  - Total: 254
- Time zone: UTC+3:30 (IRST)
  - Summer (DST): UTC+4:30 (IRDT)

Vanineh-ye Olya (Persian: ونينه عليا, also Romanized as Vanīneh-ye ‘Olyā; also known as Vanaineh, Vanenah-e Bālā, Vanīneh, Vanīneh-ye Bālā, Voneyneh, and Voneyneh-ye Bālā) is a village in Kumasi Rural District, in the Central District of Marivan County, Kurdistan Province, Iran. At the 2006 census, its population was 254, in 52 families. The village is populated by Kurds.
