= Koshneh =

Koshneh كشنه
- Village
- Location within Iran
- Coordinates: 36°09′53″N 45°46′20″E
- Country: Iran
- Province: Kurdistan
- County: Baneh
- Bakhsh: Namshir
- Rural District: Nameh Shir

Population (2006)
  - Total: 125
- Time zone: UTC+3:30 (IRST)
  - Summer (DST): UTC+4:30 (IRDT)

Koshneh (Persian: كشنه; also known as Goshneh) is a village in Nameh Shir Rural District, Namshir District, Baneh County, Kurdistan Province, Iran. At the 2006 census, its population was 125, in 23 families. The village is populated by Kurds.
