= Salasi =

Salasi or Salsi (Persian: سلسي), also rendered as Salaseh, may refer to:

- Salasi Olya
- Salasi Sofla
