= Bid Darreh =

Bid Darreh بيددره
- Village
- Location within Iran
- Coordinates: 35°22′42″N 46°27′45″E
- Country: Iran
- Province: Kurdistan
- County: Marivan
- Bakhsh: Central
- Rural District: Kumasi

Population (2006)
  - Total: 220
- Time zone: UTC+3:30 (IRST)
  - Summer (DST): UTC+4:30 (IRDT)

Bid Darreh (Persian: بيددره, also Romanized as Bīd Darreh; also known as Baidarreh, Bīdar, Bīdāreh, and Bīdarreh) is a village in Kumasi Rural District, in the Central District of Marivan County, Kurdistan Province, Iran. At the 2006 census, its population was 220, in 50 families. The village is populated by Kurds.
