= Band Zhazh =

Band Zhazh بندژاژ
- Village
- Location within Iran
- Coordinates: 36°04′12″N 45°36′56″E
- Country: Iran
- Province: Kurdistan
- County: Baneh
- Bakhsh: Namshir
- Rural District: Kani Sur

Population (2006)
  - Total: 211
- Time zone: UTC+3:30 (IRST)
  - Summer (DST): UTC+4:30 (IRDT)

Band Zhazh (Persian: بندژاژ, also Romanized as Band Zhāzh; also known as Bandeh Zhāzh) is a village in Kani Sur Rural District, Namshir District, Baneh County, Kurdistan Province, Iran. At the 2006 census, its population was 211, in 39 families. The village is populated by Kurds.
