= Salasi Sofla =

Salasi Sofla سلسي سفلي
- Village
- Location within Iran
- Coordinates: 35°33′09″N 46°12′44″E
- Country: Iran
- Province: Kurdistan
- County: Marivan
- Bakhsh: Central
- Rural District: Sarkal

Population (2006)
  - Total: 61
- Time zone: UTC+3:30 (IRST)
  - Summer (DST): UTC+4:30 (IRDT)

Salasi Sofla (Persian: سلسي سفلي, also Romanized as Salasī Soflá and Salasī-ye Soflá; also known as Salasi, Salasī-ye Buchek, Salasī-ye Kohneh, and Salsī-ye Kūchak) is a village in Sarkal Rural District, in the Central District of Marivan County, Kurdistan Province, Iran. At the 2006 census, its population was 61, in 12 families. The village is populated by Kurds.
