= Ney, Iran =

Village in Kurdistan province, Iran

Ney Persian: ني
- Village
- Location within Iran Location within Iran Kurdistan
- Coordinates: 35°29′14″N 46°07′40″E
- Country: Iran
- Province: Kurdistan
- County: Marivan
- District: Central
- Rural District: Zarivar

Population (2016)
  - Total: 2,691
- Time zone: UTC+3:30 (IRST)

Ney (Persian: ني) (Note: Also known as Neh) is a village in, and the capital of, Zarivar Rural District of the Central District of Marivan County, Kurdistan province, Iran.

== Demographics ==
=== Ethnicity ===
The village is populated by Kurds.

=== Population ===
At the time of the 2006 National Census, the village's population was 2,437 in 527 households. The following census in 2011 counted 2,560 people in 656 households. The 2016 census measured the population of the village as 2,691 people in 762 households. It was the most populous village in its rural district.
