= Najneh =

Najneh (Persian: نجنه), also rendered as Najineh, may refer to:

- Najneh-ye Olya
- Najneh-ye Sofla
