= Pir Khezran =

Village in Kurdistan province, Iran

Pir Khezran Persian: پيرخضران
- Village
- Location within Iran Location within Iran Kurdistan
- Coordinates: 35°25′11″N 46°29′56″E
- Country: Iran
- Province: Kurdistan
- County: Marivan
- District: Central
- Rural District: Kumasi

Population (2016)
  - Total: 147
- Time zone: UTC+3:30 (IRST)

Pir Khezran (Persian: پيرخضران) (Note: Also romanized as Pīr Kheẕrān) is a village in, and the capital of, Kumasi Rural District of the Central District of Marivan County, Kurdistan province, Iran.

== Demographics ==
=== Ethnicity ===
The village is populated by Kurds.

=== Population ===
At the time of the 2006 National Census, the village's population was 181 in 48 households. The following census in 2011 counted 183 people in 36 households. The 2016 census measured the population of the village as 147 people in 37 households.
