= Bayizid =

Bayizid بايزيد
- Village
- Location within Iran
- Coordinates: 36°02′31″N 45°36′50″E
- Country: Iran
- Province: Kurdistan
- County: Baneh
- Bakhsh: Namshir
- Rural District: Kani Sur

Population (2006)
  - Total: 91
- Time zone: UTC+3:30 (IRST)
  - Summer (DST): UTC+4:30 (IRDT)

Bayizid (Persian: بايزيد, also Romanized as Bāyīzīd; also known as Bāyezī) is a village in Kani Sur Rural District, Namshir District, Baneh County, Kurdistan Province, Iran. At the 2006 census, its population was 91, in 15 families. The village is populated by Kurds.
