= Balkar, Iran =

Balkar بلكر
- Village
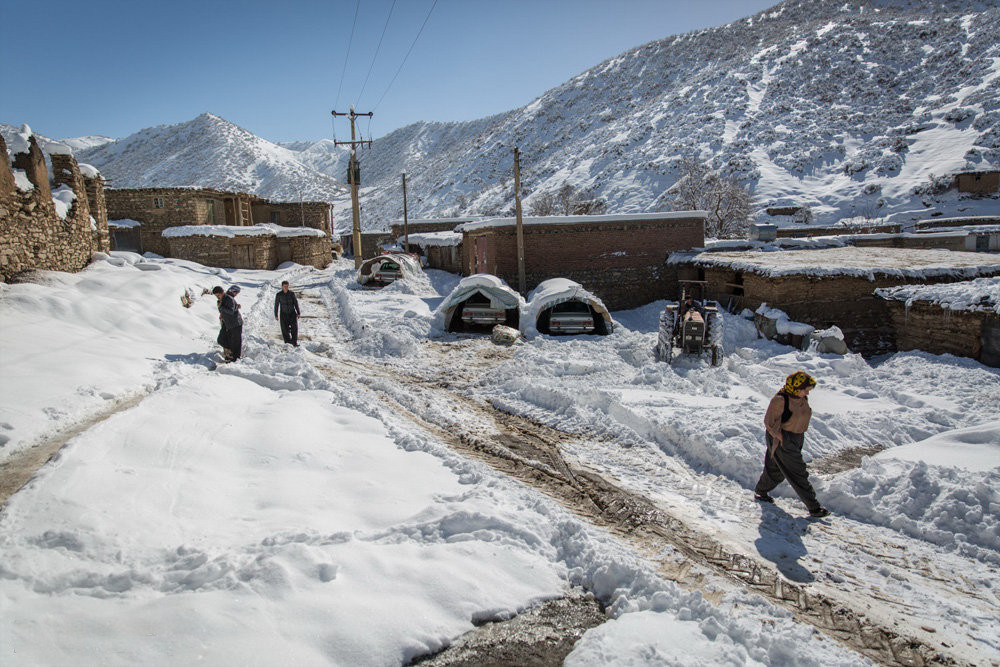
- Balkar 2017

- Location within Iran
- Coordinates: 35°33′02″N 46°22′45″E
- Country: Iran
- Province: Kurdistan
- County: Marivan
- Bakhsh: Sarshiv
- Rural District: Sarshiv

Population (2006)
  - Total: 203
- Time zone: UTC+3:30 (IRST)
  - Summer (DST): UTC+4:30 (IRDT)

Balkar (Persian: بلكر, also Romanized as Balker) is a village in Sarshiv Rural District, Sarshiv District, Marivan County, Kurdistan Province, Iran. At the 2006 census, its population was 203, in 39 families. In 2011, it had a population of 167. The village is populated by Central Kurdish speakers.
