= Darineh-ye Olya =

Darineh-ye Olya دارينه عليا
- Village
- Location within Iran
- Coordinates: 36°04′30″N 45°41′29″E
- Country: Iran
- Province: Kurdistan
- County: Baneh
- Bakhsh: Namshir
- Rural District: Kani Sur

Population (2006)
  - Total: 168
- Time zone: UTC+3:30 (IRST)
  - Summer (DST): UTC+4:30 (IRDT)

Darineh-ye Olya (Persian: دارينه عليا, also Romanized as Dārīneh-ye ‘Olyā; also known as Dārīneh-ye Bālā) is a village in Kani Sur Rural District, Namshir District, Baneh County, Kurdistan Province, Iran. At the 2006 census, its population was 168, in 30 families. The village is populated by Kurds.
