= Sarshiv District =

Sarshiv District may refer to:

- Sarshiv District (Marivan County), Kurdistan Province, Iran
- Sarshiv District (Saqqez County), Kurdistan Province, Iran

== See also ==
- Sarshiv Rural District, in Sarshiv District, Marivan County
