= Sivech =

Sivech or Siuch or Seyuch (Persian: سيوچ) may refer to:

- Sivech-e Olya
- Sivech-e Sofla
