= Asrabad-e Tazeh =

Asrabad-e Tazeh عصر آباد تازه
- Village
- Location within Iran
- Coordinates: 35°33′05″N 46°16′03″E
- Country: Iran
- Province: Kurdistan
- County: Marivan
- Bakhsh: Central
- Rural District: Sarkal

Population (2006)
  - Total: 460
- Time zone: UTC+3:30 (IRST)
  - Summer (DST): UTC+4:30 (IRDT)

Asrabad-e Tazeh (Persian: عصر آباد تازه, also Romanized as ‘Aşrābād-e Tāzeh and ‘Asrābād Tazeh; also known as ‘Aşrābād, ‘Asrābād-e Jadīd, ‘Aşrābād-e ‘Olyā, and Asrawa) is a village in Sarkal Rural District, in the Central District of Marivan County, Kurdistan Province, Iran. At the 2006 census, its population was 460, in 98 families. The village is populated by Kurds.
