= Sivar, Kurdistan =

Sivar سيور
- Village
- Location within Iran
- Coordinates: 35°29′28″N 46°31′56″E
- Country: Iran
- Province: Kurdistan
- County: Marivan
- Bakhsh: Sarshiv
- Rural District: Gol-e Cheydar

Population (2006)
  - Total: 123
- Time zone: UTC+3:30 (IRST)
  - Summer (DST): UTC+4:30 (IRDT)

Sivar (Persian: سيور, also Romanized as Sīvar, Seyvar, and Sīwar; also known as Sevar) is a village in Gol-e Cheydar Rural District, Sarshiv District, Marivan County, Kurdistan Province, Iran. At the 2006 census, its population was 123, in 32 families. The village is populated by Kurds.
