= Asrabad =

Asrabad (Persian: عصراباد or عصر آباد) may refer to:

- Asrabad, Ardabil, Ardabil Province
- Asrabad, Kamyaran, Kurdistan Province
- Asrabad, Marivan, Kurdistan Province
- Asrabad, Saqqez, Kurdistan Province
