= Musek =

Musek موسک
- Village
- Location within Iran
- Coordinates: 35°32′07″N 46°11′26″E
- Country: Iran
- Province: Kurdistan
- County: Marivan
- Bakhsh: Central
- Rural District: Sarkal

Population (2006)
  - Total: 759
- Time zone: UTC+3:30 (IRST)
  - Summer (DST): UTC+4:30 (IRDT)

Musek (Persian: موسک, also Romanized as Mūsek and Mūsak; also known as Musik and Mūsk) is a village in Sarkal Rural District, in the Central District of Marivan County, Kurdistan Province, Iran. At the 2006 census, its population was 759, in 176 families. The village is populated by Kurds.
