= Siahumeh-ye Kohneh =

Village in Kurdistan, Iran

Siahumeh-ye Kohneh سياحومه كهنه
- Village
- Country: Iran
- Province: Kurdistan
- County: Baneh
- Bakhsh: Namshir
- Rural District: Kani Sur

Population (2006)
  - Total: 80
- Time zone: UTC+3:30 (IRST)
  - Summer (DST): UTC+4:30 (IRDT)

Siahumeh-ye Kohneh (Persian: سياحومه كهنه, also Romanized as Sīāḩūmeh-ye Kohneh) is a village in Kani Sur Rural District, Namshir District, Baneh County, Kurdistan Province, Iran. At the 2006 census, its population was 80, in 12 families. The village is populated by Kurds.
