= Shahrani =

Shahrani may refer to:

- Al-Shahrani, a surname
- Shahrani, Iran, a village
