= Kani Holucheh =

Kani Holucheh كاني هلوچه
- Village
- Location within Iran
- Coordinates: 36°03′24″N 45°40′15″E
- Country: Iran
- Province: Kurdistan
- County: Baneh
- Bakhsh: Namshir
- Rural District: Kani Sur

Population (2006)
  - Total: 238
- Time zone: UTC+3:30 (IRST)
  - Summer (DST): UTC+4:30 (IRDT)

Kani Holucheh (Persian: كاني هلوچه, also Romanized as Kānī Holūcheh; also known as Holūcheh) is a village in Kani Sur Rural District, Namshir District, Baneh County, Kurdistan Province, Iran. At the 2006 census, its population was 238, in 36 families. The village is populated by Kurds.
