= Helizabad =

Helizabad or Halizabad (Persian: هليز آباد) may refer to:

- Helizabad, Dehgolan
- Halizabad, Marivan
