= Kulan, Kurdistan =

Kulan كولان
- Village
- Location within Iran
- Coordinates: 35°33′36″N 46°09′30″E
- Country: Iran
- Province: Kurdistan
- County: Marivan
- Bakhsh: Central
- Rural District: Zarivar

Population (2006)
  - Total: 641
- Time zone: UTC+3:30 (IRST)
  - Summer (DST): UTC+4:30 (IRDT)

Kulan (Persian: كولان, Kurdish: كۆڵان, also Romanized as Kūlān) is a village in Zarivar Rural District, in the Central District of Marivan County, Kurdistan Province, Iran. At the 2006 census, its population was 641, in 139 families. The village is populated by Kurds.
