= Amreh Sit =

Amreh Sit عمره سيت
- Village
- Location within Iran
- Coordinates: 35°59′38″N 45°36′09″E
- Country: Iran
- Province: Kurdistan
- County: Baneh
- Bakhsh: Namshir
- Rural District: Bowalhasan

Population (2006)
  - Total: 84
- Time zone: UTC+3:30 (IRST)
  - Summer (DST): UTC+4:30 (IRDT)

Amreh Sit (Persian: عمره سيت, also Romanized as ‘Amreh Sīt; also known as Hameh Resīd) is a village in Bowalhasan Rural District, Namshir District, Baneh County, Kurdistan Province, Iran. At the 2006 census, its population was 84, in 18 families. The village is populated by Kurds.
