= Chavak, Kurdistan =

Chavak چاوك
- Village
- Location within Iran
- Coordinates: 35°33′30″N 46°10′36″E
- Country: Iran
- Province: Kurdistan
- County: Marivan
- Bakhsh: Central
- Rural District: Sarkal

Population (2006)
  - Total: 115
- Time zone: UTC+3:30 (IRST)
  - Summer (DST): UTC+4:30 (IRDT)

Chavak (Persian: چاوك, also Romanized as Chāvak, Chāvok, and Chāwak; also known as Chūk) is a village in Sarkal Rural District, in the Central District of Marivan County, Kurdistan Province, Iran. At the 2006 census, its population was 115, in 25 families. The village is populated by Kurds.
