= Halizabad, Marivan =

Halizabad هليز آباد
- Village
- Location within Iran
- Coordinates: 35°26′01″N 46°28′45″E
- Country: Iran
- Province: Kurdistan
- County: Marivan
- Bakhsh: Central
- Rural District: Kumasi

Population (2006)
  - Total: 259
- Time zone: UTC+3:30 (IRST)
  - Summer (DST): UTC+4:30 (IRDT)

Halizabad (Persian: هليز آباد, also Romanized as Halīzābād and Helīzābād) is a village in Kumasi Rural District, in the Central District of Marivan County, Kurdistan Province, Iran. At the 2006 census, its population was 259, in 52 families. The village is populated by Kurds.
