= Bileh, Iran =

Bileh بيله
- Village
- Location within Iran
- Coordinates: 35°30′12″N 46°11′10″E
- Country: Iran
- Province: Kurdistan
- County: Marivan
- Bakhsh: Central
- Rural District: Sarkal

Population (2006)
  - Total: 520
- Time zone: UTC+3:30 (IRST)
  - Summer (DST): UTC+4:30 (IRDT)

Bileh (Persian: بيله, also Romanized as Bīleh, Bayaleh, Beylah, and Beyleh; also known as Bīāleh) is a village in Sarkal Rural District, in the Central District of Marivan County, Kurdistan Province, Iran. At the 2006 census, its population was 520, in 104 families. The village is populated by Kurds.
