= Bardeh Sefid, Marivan =

Bardeh Sefid برده سفيد
- Village
- Location within Iran
- Coordinates: 35°29′14″N 46°25′54″E
- Country: Iran
- Province: Kurdistan
- County: Marivan
- Bakhsh: Central
- Rural District: Kumasi

Population (2006)
  - Total: 325
- Time zone: UTC+3:30 (IRST)
  - Summer (DST): UTC+4:30 (IRDT)

Bardeh Sefid (Persian: برده سفيد, also Romanized as Bardeh Sefīd and Bardeh Safīd) is a village in Kumasi Rural District, in the Central District of Marivan County, Kurdistan Province, Iran. At the 2006 census, its population was 325, in 82 families. The village is populated by Kurds.
