= Bar Qaleh =

Bar Qaleh or Barqaleh (Persian: برقلعه) may refer to:

- Bar Qaleh, Divandarreh
- Bar Qaleh, Marivan
