= Sufi Baleh =

Sufi Baleh صوفی بله
- Village
- Location within Iran
- Coordinates: 35°36′58″N 46°35′17″E
- Country: Iran
- Province: Kurdistan
- County: Marivan
- Bakhsh: Sarshiv
- Rural District: Gol-e Cheydar

Population (2006)
  - Total: 270
- Time zone: UTC+3:30 (IRST)
  - Summer (DST): UTC+4:30 (IRDT)

Sufi Baleh (Persian: صوفی بله, also Romanized as Şūfī Baleh and Şūfī Beleh; also known as Baleh, Şūfī, and Sūfi Bileh) is a village in Gol-e Cheydar Rural District, Sarshiv District, Marivan County, Kurdistan Province, Iran. At the 2006 census, its population was 270, in 49 families. The village is populated by Kurds.
