= Bar Qaleh, Marivan =

Bar Qaleh برقلعه
- Village
- Location within Iran
- Coordinates: 35°29′18″N 46°10′48″E
- Country: Iran
- Province: Kurdistan
- County: Marivan
- Bakhsh: Central
- Rural District: Sarkal

Population (2006)
  - Total: 310
- Time zone: UTC+3:30 (IRST)
  - Summer (DST): UTC+4:30 (IRDT)

Bar Qaleh (Persian: برقلعه, also Romanized as Bar Qal‘eh and Barqal‘eh) is a village in Sarkal Rural District, in the Central District of Marivan County, Kurdistan Province, Iran. At the 2006 census, its population was 310, in 76 families. The village is populated by Kurds.
