= Namshir =

Namshir (Persian: نمشیر) may refer to:

- Namshir, Kurdistan
- Namshir District, in Kurdistan Province
