= Sartekeh =

Sartekeh (Persian: سارتكه), also rendered as Sardekeh, may refer to:

- Sartekeh-ye Olya
- Sartekeh-ye Sofla
