= Balkar (disambiguation) =

The Balkars are a Turkic ethnic group native to the Kabardino-Balkarian Republic, Russia.

Balkar can also refer to:

== Places ==
- Balkar, Iran, a village in Kurdistan Province, Iran
- Balkar, Gölbaşı, municipality in Gölbaşı District, Adıyaman Province, Turkey

== People ==
- Balkar Sidhu (born 1971), Indian politician
- Balkar Singh, Indian politician
- Balkar Singh (athlete) (fl. 1958), Indian discus thrower
- Galip Balkar (1936–1983), Turkish diplomat

== Fiction ==
- Balkar (Legends of Chima), King of the Bear Tribe in the Legends of Chima TV series
- Surname of several characters in the Japanese web manga Centuria
