= Alut =

Alut may refer to:

- Alut District, an administrative subdivision of Iran
- Alut, Namshir, a village in Iran
- Ilut, a place in Israel
- Alut clan, a Manchu nobility clan
