= Chuman =

Village in Kurdistan province, Iran

Chuman Persian: چومان
- Village
- Location within Iran Location within Iran Kurdistan
- Coordinates: 35°58′30″N 45°34′55″E
- Country: Iran
- Province: Kurdistan
- County: Baneh
- District: Namshir
- Rural District: Bowalhasan

Population (2016)
  - Total: 371
- Time zone: UTC+3:30 (IRST)

Chuman (Persian: چومان) (Note: Also romanized as Chūmān) is a village in Bowalhasan Rural District of Namshir District in Baneh County, Kurdistan province, Iran.

== Demographics ==
=== Ethnicity ===
The village is populated by Kurds.

=== Population ===
At the time of the 2006 National Census, the village's population was 251 in 57 households. The following census in 2011 counted 247 people in 62 households. The 2016 census measured the population of the village as 371 people in 106 households.
