= Shayar =

Shayar may refer to:

- Shayar (poet), poet who writes sher or shayari in the Urdu or Hindi language
- Shair (film), a 1949 Indian film starring Dev Anand
- Shayar, Iran, a village in Kurdistan Province, Iran
- Xayar County, or Shayar County, in Aksu Prefecture, Xinjiang, China
- Xayar Town, seat of Xayar County

== See also ==
- Shair (disambiguation)
- Shayar-e-Kashmir Mahjoor, a 1972 Indian film
