= Neshkan =

Neshkan may refer to:

- Neshkan, Russia, a rural locality in Chukotka Autonomous Okrug, Russia
- Neshkān, alternative name of Neshkash, a village in Iran
