= Anjineh-ye Ebrahim-e Jonubi =

Anjineh-ye Ebrahim-e Jonubi انجينه ابراهيم جنوبي
- Village
- Location within Iran
- Coordinates: 35°58′51″N 45°38′00″E
- Country: Iran
- Province: Kurdistan
- County: Baneh
- Bakhsh: Namshir
- Rural District: Bowalhasan

Population (2006)
  - Total: 141
- Time zone: UTC+3:30 (IRST)
  - Summer (DST): UTC+4:30 (IRDT)

Anjineh-ye Ebrahim-e Jonubi (Persian: انجينه ابراهيم جنوبي, also Romanized as Ānjīneh-ye Ebrāhīm-e Jonūbī; also known as Ānjīneh-ye Ebrāhīm and Anjīneh-ye Soflá) is a village in Bowalhasan Rural District, Namshir District, Baneh County, Kurdistan Province, Iran. At the time of the 2006 census, its population was 141, in 27 families. The village is populated by Kurds.
