= Bidar (disambiguation) =

Bidar is a city in the Indian state of Karnataka.

Bidar may also refer to the following :

== Places ==
=== India ===
Karnataka

- Bidar railway station, in the city
- Bidar Airport, in the city
- Bidar (Vidhan Sabha constituency)
- Bidar (Lok Sabha constituency)
- Bidar district, district in the state of Karnataka
- Bidar taluka, subdistrict of the state
- Bidar Subah, a former Mughal imperial province
- Bidar Sultanate, one of the late medieval Deccan sultanates

=== Iran ===
- Bid Darreh, also known as Bīdar, a village of Iran
- Shabandar, also known as Shab Bīdār, a village of Iran

== People ==
- Abdennour Bidar (born 1971), French writer and philosopher
- Martin Bidař (born 1999), Czech pair skater
- Petr Bidař (born 1991), Czech pair skater
- Rafiullah Bidar, Afghan human rights worker
- Bidar Kadınefendi (1858–1918), fourth wife of Sultan Abdul Hamid II of the Ottoman Empire

== Other uses ==
- Bidar (film), 2026 Iranian film by Hosein Amiri-Domari

== See also ==
- Bidart, a commune in Nouvelle-Aquitaine, France
