= Chavak =

Chavak or Chavok or Chawak (Persian: چاوك) may refer to:

- Chavak, Bushehr
- Chavak, Kurdistan
