= Musak =

Musak may refer to:

- Muzak, a brand of background music
- Aisi language, also known as Musak, a Papuan language
- Musek, a village in Sarkal Rural District, Marivan County, Kurdistan Province, Iran
