= Sianav =

Sianav or Sianow or Seyanav (Persian: سياناو) may refer to:

- Sianav, Kamyaran
- Sianav, Marivan
