= Oskol (disambiguation) =

Oskol is an alternate name for the Oskil river in Russia and Ukraine. It may also refer to:

- Novy Oskol, town in Belgorod Oblast, Russia
- Stary Oskol, city in Belgorod Oblast, Russia
- Oskol-e Sofla, village in Kurdistan Province, Iran

== See also ==
- Oskil Reservoir, an artificial lake on the river in Kharkiv Oblast, Ukraine
