= Owghal =

Village in Kurdistan province, Iran

Owghal Persian: اوغل
- Village
- Location within Iran Location within Iran Kurdistan
- Coordinates: 36°01′32″N 45°39′50″E
- Country: Iran
- Province: Kurdistan
- County: Baneh
- District: Namshir
- Rural District: Kani Sur

Population (2016)
  - Total: 388
- Time zone: UTC+3:30 (IRST)

Owghal (Persian: اوغل) is a village in Kani Sur Rural District of Namshir District in Baneh County, Kurdistan province, Iran.

== Demographics ==
=== Ethnicity ===
The village is populated by Kurds.

=== Population ===
At the time of the 2006 National Census, the village's population was 301 in 55 households. The following census in 2011 counted 336 people in 72 households. The 2016 census measured the population of the village as 388 people in 112 households.
