= Sepidareh, Namshir =

Village in Kurdistan province, Iran

Sepidareh Persian: سپيداره
- Village
- Location within Iran Location within Iran Kurdistan
- Coordinates: 36°09′04″N 45°48′15″E
- Country: Iran
- Province: Kurdistan
- County: Baneh
- District: Namshir
- Rural District: Nameh Shir

Population (2016)
  - Total: 186
- Time zone: UTC+3:30 (IRST)

Sepidareh (Persian: سپيداره) (Note: Also romanized as Sepīdāreh; also known as Safid Dareh and Sefīdāreh) is a village in Nameh Shir Rural District of Namshir District in Baneh County, Kurdistan province, Iran.

== Demographics ==
=== Ethnicity ===
The village is populated by Kurds.

=== Population ===
At the time of the 2006 National Census, the village's population was 273 in 41 households. The following census in 2011 counted 193 people in 36 households. The 2016 census measured the population of the village as 186 people in 52 households.
