= Dul Arzan =

Village in Kurdistan province, Iran

Dul Arzan Persian: دول ارزن
- Village
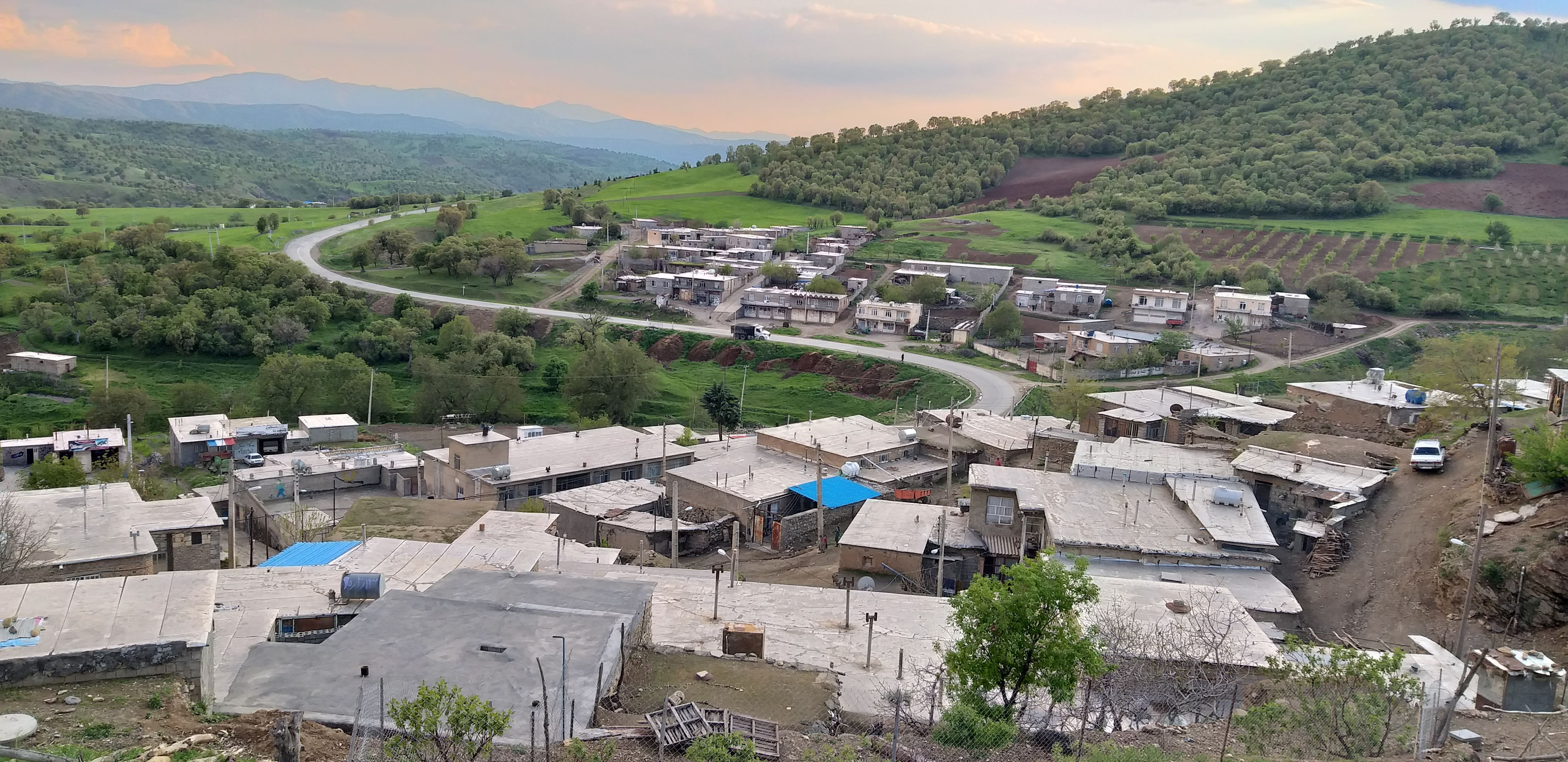
- The village of Dul Arzan

- Location within Iran Location within Iran Kurdistan
- Coordinates: 36°09′15″N 45°41′57″E
- Country: Iran
- Province: Kurdistan
- County: Baneh
- District: Namshir
- Rural District: Nameh Shir

Population (2016)
  - Total: 402
- Time zone: UTC+3:30 (IRST)

Dul Arzan (Persian: دول ارزن) (Note: Also romanized as Dowlarzan, Dūl Arzān, and Dūlārzan) is a village in Nameh Shir Rural District of Namshir District in Baneh County, Kurdistan province, Iran.

== Demographics ==
=== Ethnicity ===
The village is populated by Kurds.

=== Population ===
At the time of the 2006 National Census, the village's population was 411 in 78 households. The following census in 2011 counted 380 people in 80 households. The 2016 census measured the population of the village as 402 people in 119 households.
