= Gileh =

Gileh (Persian: گيله) may refer to:

- Gileh, Kurdistan
- Gileh, West Azerbaijan
