= Zali =

Zali (Persian: زلي or زالي) may refer to:

- Zali, Kurdistan (زلي - Zalī)
- Zali, North Khorasan (زالي - Zālī)
