= Siahumeh =

Village in Kurdistan province, Iran

Siahumeh Persian: سيا حومه
- Village
- Location within Iran Location within Iran Kurdistan
- Coordinates: 36°03′27″N 45°40′52″E
- Country: Iran
- Province: Kurdistan
- County: Baneh
- District: Namshir
- Rural District: Kani Sur

Population (2016)
  - Total: 547
- Time zone: UTC+3:30 (IRST)

Siahumeh (Persian: سيا حومه) (Note: Also romanized as Sīāḩūmeh) is a village in Kani Sur Rural District of Namshir District in Baneh County, Kurdistan province, Iran.

== Demographics ==
=== Ethnicity ===
The village is populated by Kurds.

=== Population ===
At the time of the 2006 National Census, the village's population was 623 in 125 households. The following census in 2011 counted 639 people in 144 households. The 2016 census measured the population of the village as 547 people in 157 households.
