= Darreh Panbehdan =

Darreh Panbehdan (Persian: دره پنبه دان) may refer to:

- Darreh Panbehdan, Marivan
- Darreh Panbeh Dan, Saqqez
