= Gurehdar =

Village in Kurdistan province, Iran

Gurehdar Persian: گوره دار
- Village
- Location within Iran Location within Iran Kurdistan
- Coordinates: 35°58′26″N 45°41′15″E
- Country: Iran
- Province: Kurdistan
- County: Baneh
- District: Namshir
- Rural District: Bowalhasan

Population (2016)
  - Total: 278
- Time zone: UTC+3:30 (IRST)

Gurehdar (Persian: گوره دار) (Note: Also romanized as Gūrehdār) is a village in Bowalhasan Rural District of Namshir District in Baneh County, Kurdistan province, Iran.

== Demographics ==
=== Ethnicity ===
The village is populated by Kurds.

=== Population ===
At the time of the 2006 National Census, the village's population was 156 in 26 households. The following census in 2011 counted 180 people in 42 households. The 2016 census measured the population of the village as 278 people in 69 households.
