= Bikash (given name) =

Bikash is a given name. Notable people with the name include:

- Bikash Bhattacharjee (1940–2006), Indian painter from Kolkata in West Bengal
- Bikash Ranjan Bhattacharya, Indian politician
- Charu Bikash Chakma, Bangladeshi Chakma politician
- Bikash Singh Chhetri (born 1992), footballer from Nepal
- Bikash Chowdhury (1932–2005), Indian politician
- Bikash Chowdhury (cricketer) (1938–2019), Indian former cricketer
- Bikash Dali (born 1980), Nepalese cricketer
- Bikash Jairu (born 1990), Indian professional footballer
- Bikash Malla (born 1986), footballer from Nepal
- Bikash Panji, Indian football Midfielder
- Bikash Roy, actor in Bengali cinema
- Bikash Sarkar (born 1965), Bengali poet, writer, journalist and editor
- Bikash Sinha, Indian physicist, active in nuclear physics and high energy physics

== See also ==
- Bikash, a village in Kurdistan Province, Iran
- Grameen Baybosa Bikash, a non-profit and non-government organization that uses microcredit as a tool for fighting poverty
- Bickmarsh
