= Manijalan =

Village in Kurdistan province, Iran

Manijalan Persian: منيجلان
- Village
- Location within Iran Location within Iran Kurdistan
- Coordinates: 36°08′50″N 45°48′10″E
- Country: Iran
- Province: Kurdistan
- County: Baneh
- District: Namshir
- Rural District: Nameh Shir

Population (2016)
  - Total: 409
- Time zone: UTC+3:30 (IRST)

Manijalan (Persian: منيجلان) (Note: Also romanized as Manījalān) is a village in Nameh Shir Rural District of Namshir District in Baneh County, Kurdistan province, Iran.

== Demographics ==
=== Ethnicity ===
The village is populated by Kurds.

=== Population ===
At the time of the 2006 National Census, the village's population was 571 in 95 households. The following census in 2011 counted 433 people in 90 households. The 2016 census measured the population of the village as 409 people in 115 households.
