= Bardeh Rash-e Kuchek =

Bardeh Rash-e Kuchek برده رش كوچك
- Village
- Location within Iran
- Coordinates: 35°43′55″N 46°20′33″E
- Country: Iran
- Province: Kurdistan
- County: Marivan
- Bakhsh: Sarshiv
- Rural District: Sarshiv

Population (2006)
  - Total: 298
- Time zone: UTC+3:30 (IRST)
  - Summer (DST): UTC+4:30 (IRDT)

Bardeh Rash-e Kuchek (Persian: برده رش كوچك, also Romanized as Bardeh Rash-e Kūchek; also known as Bardeh Rash, Bardeh Rasheh, Bard-e Rash, and Bard Rasheh) is a village in Sarshiv Rural District, Sarshiv District, Marivan County, Kurdistan Province, Iran. At the 2006 census, its population was 298, in 58 families. The village is populated by Kurds.
