= Sianow =

Sianow may refer to:

- Sianow, Iran (disambiguation)
- Sianów, Poland
