= Sivar =

Sivar or Seyvar or Siwar (Persian: سيور) may refer to these places in Iran:

- Sivar, Isfahan
- Sivar, Kurdistan

== See also ==
- Sawar or sowar and sivar, a military rank in India and Pakistan
- San Salvador, the capital of El Salvador, colloquially known as Sivar
