= Nameh Shir =

Nameh Shir نمه شير
- Village
- Location within Iran
- Coordinates: 36°07′55″N 45°44′09″E
- Country: Iran
- Province: Kurdistan
- County: Baneh
- Bakhsh: Namshir
- Rural District: Nameh Shir

Population (2006)
  - Total: 197
- Time zone: UTC+3:30 (IRST)
  - Summer (DST): UTC+4:30 (IRDT)

Nameh Shir (Persian: نمه شير, also Romanized as Nameh Shīr; also known as Namashīr and Namshīr) is a village in Nameh Shir Rural District, Namshir District, Baneh County, Kurdistan Province, Iran. At the 2006 census, its population was 197, in 30 families. The village is populated by Kurds.
