= Sartekeh-ye Olya =

Sartekeh-ye Olya سارتكه عليا
- village
- Location within Iran
- Coordinates: 36°01′44″N 45°37′49″E
- Country: Iran
- Province: Kurdistan
- County: Baneh
- Bakhsh: Namshir
- Rural District: Kani Sur

Population (2016)
  - Total: 200
- Time zone: UTC+3:30 (IRST)
  - Summer (DST): UTC+4:30 (IRDT)

Sartekeh-ye Olya (Persian: سارتكه عليا, also Romanized as Sārtekeh-ye ‘Olyā; also known as Sārdekeh-ye Bālā) is a village in Kani Sur Rural District, Namshir District, Baneh County, Kurdistan Province, Iran. At the 2016 census, its population was around 200. The village is populated by Kurds.
