= Mamal =

Village in Kurdistan province, Iran

Mamal Persian: مامال
- Village
- Location within Iran Location within Iran Kurdistan
- Coordinates: 36°02′56″N 45°42′18″E
- Country: Iran
- Province: Kurdistan
- County: Baneh
- District: Namshir
- Rural District: Kani Sur

Population (2016)
  - Total: 347
- Time zone: UTC+3:30 (IRST)

Mamal (Persian: مامال) (Note: Also romanized as Māmāl) is a village in Kani Sur Rural District of Namshir District in Baneh County, Kurdistan province, Iran.

== Demographics ==
=== Ethnicity ===
The village is populated by Kurds.

=== Population ===
At the time of the 2006 National Census, the village's population was 393 in 89 households. The following census in 2011 counted 382 people in 86 households. The 2016 census measured the population of the village as 347 people in 106 households.
