= Anjineh-ye Sofla =

Village in Kurdistan province, Iran

Anjineh-ye Sofla Persian: انجينه سفلي
- Village
- Location within Iran Location within Iran Kurdistan
- Coordinates: 35°58′19″N 45°38′48″E
- Country: Iran
- Province: Kurdistan
- County: Baneh
- District: Namshir
- Rural District: Bowalhasan

Population (2016)
  - Total: 257
- Time zone: UTC+3:30 (IRST)

Anjineh-ye Sofla (Persian: انجينه سفلي) (Note: Also romanized as Anjīneh-ye Soflá; also known as Ānjīneh-ye Reẕā) is a village in Bowalhasan Rural District of Namshir District in Baneh County, Kurdistan province, Iran.

== Demographics ==
=== Ethnicity ===
The village is populated by Kurds.

=== Population ===
At the time of the 2006 National Census, the village's population was 259 in 43 households. The following census in 2011 counted 258 people in 56 households. The 2016 census measured the population of the village as 257 people in 72 households.
