= Ziviyeh, Baneh =

Village in Kurdistan province, Iran

Ziviyeh Persian: زيويه
- Village
- Location within Iran Location within Iran Kurdistan
- Coordinates: 36°06′20″N 45°45′05″E
- Country: Iran
- Province: Kurdistan
- County: Baneh
- District: Namshir
- Rural District: Nameh Shir

Population (2016)
  - Total: 518
- Time zone: UTC+3:30 (IRST)

Ziviyeh (Persian: زيويه) (Note: Also romanized as Zīvīyeh) is a village in Nameh Shir Rural District of Namshir District in Baneh County, Kurdistan province, Iran.

== Demographics ==
=== Ethnicity ===
The village is populated by Kurds.

=== Population ===
At the time of the 2006 National Census, the village's population was 625 in 95 households. The following census in 2011 counted 580 people in 117 households. The 2016 census measured the population of the village as 518 people in 138 households.
