= Kukhan =

Kukhan (Persian: كوخان) may refer to:

- Kukhan, Kurdistan
- Kukhan, West Azerbaijan
