= Baleh =

Baleh (Persian: باله or بله) may refer to:

- Baleh, Kurdistan (بله - Baleh)
- Baleh, Sarawak
- Baleh (state constituency), represented in the Sarawak State Legislative Assembly
