= Seyyed Sarem =

Village in Kurdistan province, Iran

Seyyed Sarem Persian: سيدصارم
- Village
- Location within Iran Location within Iran Kurdistan
- Coordinates: 36°04′30″N 45°45′37″E
- Country: Iran
- Province: Kurdistan
- County: Baneh
- District: Namshir
- Rural District: Kani Sur

Population (2016)
  - Total: 289
- Time zone: UTC+3:30 (IRST)

Seyyed Sarem (Persian: سيدصارم) (Note: Also romanized as Seyyed Şārem; also known as Şeyd Şārem) is a village in Kani Sur Rural District of Namshir District in Baneh County, Kurdistan province, Iran.

== Demographics ==
=== Ethnicity ===
The village is populated by Kurds.

=== Population ===
At the time of the 2006 National Census, the village's population was 275 in 54 households. The following census in 2011 counted 284 people in 62 households. The 2016 census measured the population of the village as 289 people in 84 households.
