= Sartekeh-ye Sofla =

Sartekeh-ye Sofla سارتكه سفلي
- Village
- Location within Iran
- Coordinates: 36°03′25″N 45°35′48″E
- Country: Iran
- Province: Kurdistan
- County: Baneh
- Bakhsh: Namshir
- Rural District: Kani Sur

Population (2006)
  - Total: 34
- Time zone: UTC+3:30 (IRST)
  - Summer (DST): UTC+4:30 (IRDT)

Sartekeh-ye Sofla (Persian: سارتكه سفلي, also Romanized as Sārtekeh-ye Soflá; also known as Sārdekeh-ye Pā‘īn) is a village in Kani Sur Rural District, Namshir District, Baneh County, Kurdistan Province, Iran. At the 2006 census, its population was 34, in 7 families. The village is populated by Kurds.
