= Bileh =

Bileh may refer to:

- Bileh (pirate), Somali pirate
- Bileh, Iran, village in Iran
