= Bardeh Rash, Bowalhasan =

Village in Kurdistan province, Iran

Bardeh Rash Persian: برده رش
- Village
- Location within Iran Location within Iran Kurdistan
- Coordinates: 35°59′40″N 45°34′39″E
- Country: Iran
- Province: Kurdistan
- County: Baneh
- District: Namshir
- Rural District: Bowalhasan

Population (2016)
  - Total: 307
- Time zone: UTC+3:30 (IRST)

Bardeh Rash (Persian: برده رش) is a village in Bowalhasan Rural District of Namshir District in Baneh County, Kurdistan province, Iran.

== Demographics ==
=== Ethnicity ===
The village is populated by Kurds.

=== Population ===
At the time of the 2006 National Census, the village's population was 211 in 49 households. The following census in 2011 counted 221 people in 59 households. The 2016 census measured the population of the village as 307 people in 86 households.
