= Zali, Kurdistan =

Village in Kurdistan province, Iran

Zali Persian: زلی
- Village
- Location within Iran Location within Iran Kurdistan
- Coordinates: 35°59′49″N 45°33′50″E
- Country: Iran
- Province: Kurdistan
- County: Baneh
- District: Namshir
- Rural District: Bowalhasan

Population (2016)
  - Total: 266
- Time zone: UTC+3:30 (IRST)

Zali (Persian: زلی) (Note: Also romanized as Zalī; also known as Zāleh and Zālī) is a village in Bowalhasan Rural District of Namshir District in Baneh County, Kurdistan province, Iran.

== Demographics ==
=== Ethnicity ===
The village is populated by Kurds.

=== Population ===
At the time of the 2006 National Census, the village's population was 209 in 51 households. The following census in 2011 counted 218 people in 60 households. The 2016 census measured the population of the village as 266 people in 78 households.
