= Najneh-ye Olya =

Village in Kurdistan province, Iran

Najneh-ye Olya Persian: نجنه عليا
- Village
- Location within Iran Location within Iran Kurdistan
- Coordinates: 36°07′24″N 45°47′36″E
- Country: Iran
- Province: Kurdistan
- County: Baneh
- District: Namshir
- Rural District: Nameh Shir

Population (2016)
  - Total: 688
- Time zone: UTC+3:30 (IRST)

Najneh-ye Olya (Persian: نجنه عليا) (Note: Also romanized as Najneh-ye ‘Olyā; also known as Najīneh-ye Bālā) is a village in Nameh Shir Rural District of Namshir District in Baneh County, Kurdistan province, Iran.

== Demographics ==
=== Ethnicity ===
The village is populated by Kurds.

=== Population ===
At the time of the 2006 National Census, the village's population was 825 in 143 households. The following census in 2011 counted 750 people in 186 households. The 2016 census measured the population of the village as 688 people in 184 households, the most populous in its rural district.
