= Chenareh =

City in Kurdistan province, Iran

Chenareh Persian: چناره
- City
- Location within Iran Location within Iran Kurdistan
- Coordinates: 35°35′36″N 46°18′35″E
- Country: Iran
- Province: Kurdistan
- County: Marivan
- District: Sarshiv

Population (2016)
  - Total: 455
- Time zone: UTC+3:30 (IRST)

Chenareh (Persian: چناره) (Note: Also romanized as Chenārah and Chenāreh; also known as Chinare and Chināreh) is a city in, and the capital of, Sarshiv District of Marivan County, Kurdistan province, Iran. It also serves as the administrative center for Sarshiv Rural District.

== Demographics ==
=== Ethnicity ===
The city is populated by Kurds.

=== Population ===
At the time of the 2006 National Census, the city's population was 433 in 101 households. The following census in 2011 counted 184 people in 41 households. The 2016 census measured the population of the city as 455 people in 126 households.
