= Kolan =

Kolan may refer to:

== Places ==
- Kolan, Croatia, a village and municipality in Zadar county
- Kolan, Afghanistan, a village in Arghanj Khwa district, Badakhshan province
- Kolan, Queensland, previously known as North Kolan, a neighbourhood in Bucca rural locality, Bundaberg region, Wide Bay–Burnett region, Queensland
- Shire of Kolan, 1879-2008 local government area in Wide Bay–Burnett region, Queensland
- South Kolan, a rural locality in Bundaberg region, Wide Bay–Burnett region, Queensland

== See also ==
- Kulan (disambiguation)
