= Kani Sur =

City in Kurdistan province, Iran

Kani Sur Persian: كاني سور
- City
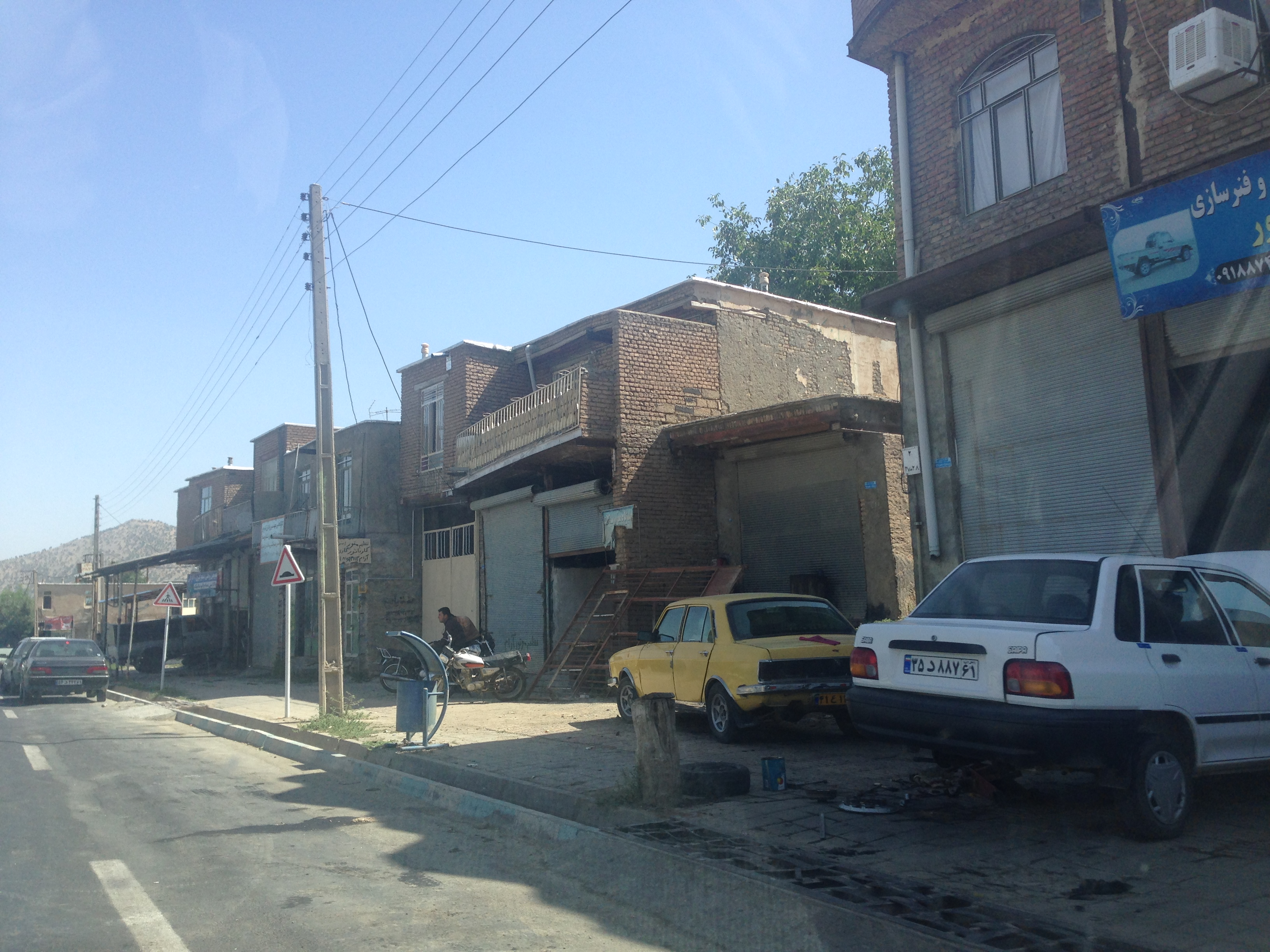
- The city of Kani Sur

- Location within Iran Location within Iran Kurdistan
- Coordinates: 36°03′32″N 45°44′54″E
- Country: Iran
- Province: Kurdistan
- County: Baneh
- District: Namshir
- Established as a city: 2000

Population (2016)
  - Total: 1,284
- Time zone: UTC+3:30 (IRST)

Kani Sur (Persian: كاني سور) (Note: Also romanized as Kānī Sūr and Kānīsūr) is a city in, and the capital of, Namshir District in Baneh County, Kurdistan province, Iran. It also serves as the administrative center for Kani Sur Rural District. The village of Kani Sur was converted to a city in 2000.

== Demographics ==
=== Ethnicity ===
The city is populated by Kurds.

=== Population ===
At the time of the 2006 National Census, the city's population was 1,131 in 239 households. The following census in 2011 counted 1,307 people in 324 households. The 2016 census measured the population of the city as 1,284 people in 368 households.
