= Zarvav-e Sofla =

Village in Kurdistan province, Iran

Zarvav-e Sofla Persian: زرواوسفلي
- Village
- Location within Iran Location within Iran Kurdistan
- Coordinates: 36°02′35″N 45°46′02″E
- Country: Iran
- Province: Kurdistan
- County: Baneh
- District: Namshir
- Rural District: Kani Sur

Population (2016)
  - Total: 665
- Time zone: UTC+3:30 (IRST)

Zarvav-e Sofla (Persian: زرواوسفلي) (Note: Also romanized as Zarvāv-e Soflá; also known as Zarvār) is a village in Kani Sur Rural District of Namshir District in Baneh County, Kurdistan province, Iran.

== Demographics ==
=== Ethnicity ===
The village is populated by Kurds.

=== Population ===
At the time of the 2006 National Census, the village's population was 546 in 119 households. The following census in 2011 counted 732 people in 158 households. The 2016 census measured the population of the village as 665 people in 175 households.
