= Sivech-e Sofla =

Village in Kurdistan province, Iran

Sivech-e Sofla Persian: سيوچ سفلي
- Village
- Location within Iran Location within Iran Kurdistan
- Coordinates: 36°04′48″N 45°48′08″E
- Country: Iran
- Province: Kurdistan
- County: Baneh
- District: Namshir
- Rural District: Kani Sur

Population (2016)
  - Total: 723
- Time zone: UTC+3:30 (IRST)

Sivech-e Sofla (Persian: سيوچ سفلي) (Note: Also romanized as Sīvech-e Soflá; also known as Seyūch, Siuch, and Sīvech) is a village in Kani Sur Rural District of Namshir District in Baneh County, Kurdistan province, Iran.

== Demographics ==
=== Ethnicity ===
The village is populated by Kurds.

=== Population ===
At the time of the 2006 National Census, the village's population was 788 in 148 households. The following census in 2011 counted 780 people in 181 households. The 2016 census measured the population of the village as 723 people in 218 households, the most populous in its rural district.
