= Zarvav-e Olya =

Village in Kurdistan province, Iran

Zarvav-e Olya Persian: زرواوعليا
- Village
- Location within Iran Location within Iran Kurdistan
- Coordinates: 36°03′11″N 45°46′48″E
- Country: Iran
- Province: Kurdistan
- County: Baneh
- District: Namshir
- Rural District: Kani Sur

Population (2016)
  - Total: 276
- Time zone: UTC+3:30 (IRST)

Zarvav-e Olya (Persian: زرواوعليا) (Note: Also romanized as Zarvāv-e ‘Olyā; also known as Zavār-e Bālā) is a village in Kani Sur Rural District of Namshir District in Baneh County, Kurdistan province, Iran.

== Demographics ==
=== Ethnicity ===
The village is populated by Kurds.

=== Population ===
At the time of the 2006 National Census, the village's population was 364 in 69 households. The following census in 2011 counted 322 people in 66 households. The 2016 census measured the population of the village as 276 people in 78 households.
