= Najneh-ye Sofla =

Village in Kurdistan province, Iran

Najneh-ye Sofla Persian: نجنه سفلي
- Village
- Location within Iran Location within Iran Kurdistan
- Coordinates: 36°08′33″N 45°46′51″E
- Country: Iran
- Province: Kurdistan
- County: Baneh
- District: Namshir
- Rural District: Nameh Shir

Population (2016)
  - Total: 311
- Time zone: UTC+3:30 (IRST)

Najneh-ye Sofla (Persian: نجنه سفلي) (Note: Also romanized as Najneh-ye Soflá) is a village in Nameh Shir Rural District of Namshir District in Baneh County, Kurdistan province, Iran.

== Demographics ==
=== Ethnicity ===
The village is populated by Kurds.

=== Population ===
At the time of the 2006 National Census, the village's population was 388 in 78 households. The following census in 2011 counted 347 people in 85 households. The 2016 census measured the population of the village as 311 people in 80 households.
