= Bowalhasan, Kurdistan =

Village in Kurdistan province, Iran

Bowalhasan Persian: بوالحسن
- Village
- Location within Iran Location within Iran Kurdistan
- Coordinates: 35°59′37″N 45°39′39″E
- Country: Iran
- Province: Kurdistan
- County: Baneh
- District: Namshir
- Rural District: Bowalhasan

Population (2016)
  - Total: 1,298
- Time zone: UTC+3:30 (IRST)

Bowalhasan (Persian: بوالحسن) (Note: Also romanized as Bowalḩasan and Bū ol Ḩasan; also known as Abū ol Ḩasan, Bolḩasan, and Bolhasan) is a village in, and the capital of, Bowalhasan Rural District in Namshir District of Baneh County, Kurdistan province, Iran.

== Demographics ==
=== Ethnicity ===
The village is populated by Kurds.

=== Population ===
At the time of the 2006 National Census, the village's population was 1,195 in 195 households. The following census in 2011 counted 1,100 people in 228 households. The 2016 census measured the population of the village as 1,298 people in 347 households, the most populous in its rural district.
