= Sivech-e Olya =

Village in Kurdistan province, Iran

Sivech-e Olya Persian: سيوچ عليا
- Village
- Location within Iran Location within Iran Kurdistan
- Country: Iran
- Province: Kurdistan
- County: Baneh
- District: Namshir
- Rural District: Kani Sur

Population (2016)
  - Total: 266
- Time zone: UTC+3:30 (IRST)

Sivech-e Olya (Persian: سيوچ عليا) (Note: Also romanized as Sīvech-e ‘Olyā; also known as Seyūch, Siuch, and Sīvech) is a village in Kani Sur Rural District of Namshir District in Baneh County, Kurdistan province, Iran.

== Demographics ==
=== Ethnicity ===
The village is populated by Kurds.

=== Population ===
At the time of the 2006 National Census, the village's population was 324 in 53 households. The following census in 2011 counted 286 people in 54 households. The 2016 census measured the population of the village as 266 people in 64 households.
