= Kani Dinar =

City in Kurdistan province, Iran

Kani Dinar Persian: كاني دينار
- City
- Location within Iran Location within Iran Kurdistan
- Coordinates: 35°27′48″N 46°12′37″E
- Country: Iran
- Province: Kurdistan
- County: Marivan
- District: Central

Population (2016)
  - Total: 13,059
- Time zone: UTC+3:30 (IRST)

Kani Dinar (Persian: كاني دينار) (Note: Also romanized as Kānī Dīnār; also known as Dīnār) is a city in the Central District of Marivan County, Kurdistan province, Iran, serving as the administrative center for Sarkal Rural District.

== Demographics ==
=== Ethnicity ===
The city is populated by Kurds.

=== Population ===
At the time of the 2006 National Census, Kani Dinar's population was 5,127 in 1,232 households, when it was a village in Sarkal Rural District. The following census in 2011 counted 11,415 people in 3,120 households, by which time the village had merged with the village of Shahrak-e Hejrat and was elevated to city status as Kani Dinar. The 2016 census measured the population of the city as 13,059 people in 3,754 households.
