= Kukhan, Kurdistan =

Village in Kurdistan province, Iran

Kukhan Persian: كوخان
- Village

- Location within Iran Location within Iran Kurdistan
- Coordinates: 36°07′22″N 45°43′18″E
- Country: Iran
- Province: Kurdistan
- County: Baneh
- District: Namshir
- Rural District: Nameh Shir

Population (2016)
  - Total: 612
- Time zone: UTC+3:30 (IRST)

Kukhan (Persian: كوخان) (Note: Also romanized as Kūkhān) is a village in, and the capital of, Nameh Shir Rural District in Namshir District of Baneh County, Kurdistan province, Iran.

== Demographics ==
=== Ethnicity ===
The village is populated by Kurds.

=== Population ===
At the time of the 2006 National Census, the village's population was 572 in 104 households. The following census in 2011 counted 777 people in 163 households. The 2016 census measured the population of the village as 612 people in 152 households.
