= Shair (disambiguation) =

Shair is the oldest Urdu-language literary magazine.

Shair may also refer to:

- Shayar (poet) or shair, a poet of Urdu (shayari) or Hindi poetry
- Shair (film), a 1949 Indian film starring Dev Anand
- 5619 Shair, a main-belt asteroid
- Himayat Ali Shair (born 1926), Pakistani poet

== See also ==
- Shayar (disambiguation)
- Sha'ir, Arab poet of the pre-Islamic era
- Shi'ar, alien species in Marvel Comics
