= Bardeh Rash, Nameh Shir =

Village in Kurdistan province, Iran

Bardeh Rash Persian: برده رش
- Village
- Location within Iran Location within Iran Kurdistan
- Coordinates: 35°59′12″N 45°35′40″E
- Country: Iran
- Province: Kurdistan
- County: Baneh
- District: Namshir
- Rural District: Nameh Shir

Population (2016)
  - Total: 423
- Time zone: UTC+3:30 (IRST)

Bardeh Rash (Persian: برده رش) is a village in Nameh Shir Rural District of Namshir District in Baneh County, Kurdistan province, Iran.

== Demographics ==
=== Ethnicity ===
The village is populated by Kurds.

=== Population ===
At the time of the 2006 National Census, the village's population was 558 in 102 households. The following census in 2011 counted 485 people in 99 households. The 2016 census measured the population of the village as 423 people in 97 households.
