= Khulan =

Khulan may refer to:

- Khulan, a Mongolian word for a subspecies of the onager called the Mongolian wild ass, Equus hemionus hemionus,
- Khulan, a common female name in Mongolia:
  - Khulan khatun (c. 1164 – c. 1215), wife of Genghis Khan
  - Khulan (wife of Anatole)
  - Chuluuny Khulan, Mongolian actress
  - Khashbatyn Khulan, Mongolian politician

== See also ==
- Kulan (disambiguation)
