= Anjineh-ye Ebrahim-e Shomali =

Village in Kurdistan province, Iran

Anjineh-ye Ebrahim-e Shomali Persian: انجينه ابراهيم شمالي
- Village
- Location within Iran Location within Iran Kurdistan
- Coordinates: 35°58′51″N 45°38′00″E
- Country: Iran
- Province: Kurdistan
- County: Baneh
- District: Namshir
- Rural District: Bowalhasan

Population (2016)
  - Total: 273
- Time zone: UTC+3:30 (IRST)

Anjineh-ye Ebrahim-e Shomali (Persian: انجينه ابراهيم شمالي) (Note: Also romanized as Ānjīneh-ye Ebrāhīm-e Shomālī; also known as Ānjīneh-ye Ebrāhīm and Anjīneh-ye Soflá) is a village in Bowalhasan Rural District of Namshir District in Baneh County, Kurdistan province, Iran.

== Demographics ==
=== Ethnicity ===
The village is populated by Kurds.

=== Population ===
At the time of the 2006 National Census, the village's population was 314 in 70 households. The following census in 2011 counted 256 people in 65 households. The 2016 census measured the population of the village as 273 people in 81 households.
