= Alut, Namshir =

Village in Kurdistan province, Iran

Alut Persian: اَلوت
- Village
- Location within Iran Location within Iran Kurdistan
- Coordinates: 36°01′17″N 45°34′34″E
- Country: Iran
- Province: Kurdistan
- County: Baneh
- District: Namshir
- Rural District: Bowalhasan

Population (2016)
  - Total: 870
- Time zone: UTC+3:30 (IRST)

Alut (Persian: اَلوت) (Note: Also romanized as Ālūt) is a village in Bowalhasan Rural District of Namshir District in Baneh County, Kurdistan province, Iran.

== Demographics ==
=== Ethnicity ===
The village is populated by Kurds.

=== Population ===
At the time of the 2006 National Census, the village's population was 916 in 187 households. The following census in 2011 counted 836 people in 204 households. The 2016 census measured the population of the village as 870 people in 240 households.
