= Asrabad, Saqqez =

Asrabad عصر آباد
- Village
- Country: Iran
- Province: Kurdistan
- County: Saqqez
- Bakhsh: Central
- Rural District: Sara

Population (2006)
  - Total: 67
- Time zone: UTC+3:30 (IRST)
  - Summer (DST): UTC+4:30 (IRDT)

Asrabad (Persian: عصر آباد, also Romanized as ʿAşrābād) is a village in Sara Rural District, in the Central District of Saqqez County, Kurdistan Province, Iran. At the 2006 census, its population was 67, in 16 families. The village is populated by Kurds.
