= Bardeh Sefid, Divandarreh =

Bardeh Sefid برده سفيد
- Village
- Location within Iran
- Coordinates: 35°40′29″N 46°53′07″E
- Country: Iran
- Province: Kurdistan
- County: Divandarreh
- Bakhsh: Saral
- Rural District: Saral

Population (2006)
  - Total: 224
- Time zone: UTC+3:30 (IRST)
  - Summer (DST): UTC+4:30 (IRDT)

Bardeh Sefid (Persian: برده سفيد, also Romanized as Bardeh Sefīd; also known as Bard-e Sefīd) is a village in Saral Rural District, Saral District, Divandarreh County, Kurdistan Province, Iran. At the 2006 census, its population was 224, in 45 families. The village is populated by Kurds.
