= Bardeh Rasheh, Saqqez =

Bardeh Rasheh برده رشه
- Village
- Location within Iran
- Coordinates: 36°11′47″N 46°50′50″E
- Country: Iran
- Province: Kurdistan
- County: Saqqez
- Bakhsh: Ziviyeh
- Rural District: Tilakuh

Population (2006)
  - Total: 181
- Time zone: UTC+3:30 (IRST)
  - Summer (DST): UTC+4:30 (IRDT)

Bardeh Rasheh (Persian: برده رشه; also known as Bardeh Rah Sheh) is a village in Tilakuh Rural District, Ziviyeh District, Saqqez County, Kurdistan Province, Iran. At the 2006 census, its population was 181, in 35 families. The village is populated by Kurds.
