= Sar Kal, Saqqez =

Sar Kal سركل
- Village
- Location within Iran
- Coordinates: 36°21′28″N 46°10′05″E
- Country: Iran
- Province: Kurdistan
- County: Saqqez
- Bakhsh: Central
- Rural District: Sara

Population (2006)
  - Total: 98
- Time zone: UTC+3:30 (IRST)
  - Summer (DST): UTC+4:30 (IRDT)

Sar Kal (Persian: سركل) is a village in Sara Rural District, in the Central District of Saqqez County, Kurdistan Province, Iran. At the 2006 census, its population was 98, in 16 families. The village is populated by Kurds.
