= Helizabad, Dehgolan =

Helizabad هلیزآباد
- Village
- Location within Iran
- Coordinates: 35°19′39″N 47°10′57″E
- Country: Iran
- Province: Kurdistan
- County: Dehgolan
- Bakhsh: Central
- Rural District: Quri Chay

Population (2006)
  - Total: 372
- Time zone: UTC+3:30 (IRST)
  - Summer (DST): UTC+4:30 (IRDT)

Helizabad (Persian: هلیزآباد, also Romanized as Helīzābād and Halīzābād; also known as Halīābād) is a village in Quri Chay Rural District, in the Central District of Dehgolan County, Kurdistan Province, Iran. At the 2006 census, its population was 372, in 95 families. The village is populated by Kurds.
