= Lanjabad, Lorestan =

Lanjabad لنج آباد
- Village
- Location within Iran
- Coordinates: 33°26′33″N 49°00′45″E
- Country: Iran
- Province: Lorestan
- County: Dorud
- Bakhsh: Central
- Rural District: Dorud

Population (2006)
  - Total: 60
- Time zone: UTC+3:30 (IRST)
  - Summer (DST): UTC+4:30 (IRDT)

Lanjabad (Persian: لنج آباد, also Romanized as Lanjābād and Lenjābād) is a village in Dorud Rural District, in the Central District of Dorud County, Lorestan Province, Iran. At the 2006 census, its population was 60, in 13 families.
