= Chavelkan-e Hajji =

Chavelkan-e Hajji چاولكان حاجي
- Village
- Location within Iran
- Coordinates: 35°31′22″N 46°41′18″E
- Country: Iran
- Province: Kurdistan
- County: Sanandaj
- Bakhsh: Kalatrazan
- Rural District: Kalatrazan

Population (2006)
  - Total: 373
- Time zone: UTC+3:30 (IRST)
  - Summer (DST): UTC+4:30 (IRDT)

Chavelkan-e Hajji (Persian: چاولكان حاجي, also Romanized as Chāvelkān-e Ḩājjī, Chāvlakān-e Ḩājjī, Chavlakan Haji, and Chāvalkān-e Ḩājjī; also known as Chābalkan Ḩājjī, Chābolakān Hajī, Chābolkān-e Ḩājī, Chābolkān Ḩājjī, Chāvolkān, and Chawalakān) is a village in Kalatrazan Rural District, Kalatrazan District, Sanandaj County, Kurdistan Province, Iran. At the 2006 census, its population was 373, in 77 families. The village is populated by Kurds.
