= Bar Qaleh, Divandarreh =

Bar Qaleh برقلعه
- Village
- Location within Iran
- Coordinates: 35°42′16″N 47°09′20″E
- Country: Iran
- Province: Kurdistan
- County: Divandarreh
- Bakhsh: Saral
- Rural District: Kowleh

Population (2006)
  - Total: 70
- Time zone: UTC+3:30 (IRST)
  - Summer (DST): UTC+4:30 (IRDT)

Bar Qaleh (Persian: برقلعه, also Romanized as Bar Qal‘eh; also known as Barkala and Barkata) is a village in Kowleh Rural District, Saral District, Divandarreh County, Kurdistan Province, Iran. As of the 2006 census, its population was 70, in 17 families. The village is populated by Kurds.
