= Sianav, Kamyaran =

Sianav سياناو
- Village
- Location within Iran
- Coordinates: 35°02′32″N 47°00′59″E
- Country: Iran
- Province: Kurdistan
- County: Kamyaran
- Bakhsh: Muchesh
- Rural District: Avalan

Population (2006)
  - Total: 168
- Time zone: UTC+3:30 (IRST)
  - Summer (DST): UTC+4:30 (IRDT)

Sianav (Persian: سياناو, also Romanized as Sīānāv and Sīānow) is a village in Avalan Rural District, Muchesh District, Kamyaran County, Kurdistan Province, Iran. At the 2006 census, its population was 168, in 39 families. The village is populated by Kurds.
