= Al-Shahrani =

Al-Shahrani is an Arabic surname relative to the clan Shahran, located in the South-West of the Arabian Peninsula, specifically in the Asir region. It may also refer to:

- Ibrahim Al-Shahrani, Saudi footballer
- Mohammed Al-Shahrani (footballer, born 1982), Saudi footballer
- Mohammed Al-Shahrani (footballer, born 1996), Saudi footballer
- Yasser Al-Shahrani, Saudi footballer
