= Doveyseh, Sanandaj =

Doveyseh دويسه
- Village
- Location within Iran
- Coordinates: 35°27′21″N 46°53′40″E
- Country: Iran
- Province: Kurdistan
- County: Sanandaj
- Bakhsh: Central
- Rural District: Sarab Qamish

Population (2006)
  - Total: 515
- Time zone: UTC+3:30 (IRST)
  - Summer (DST): UTC+4:30 (IRDT)

Doveyseh (Persian: دويسه, also Romanized as Doveyseh, Dow Veyseh, and Dow Vīseh; also known as Doosiyeh, Dūīseh, Duvizeh, and Duwizeh) is a village in Sarab Qamish Rural District, in the Central District of Sanandaj County, Kurdistan Province, Iran. At the 2006 census, its population was 515, in 117 families. The village is populated by Kurds.
