= Heyatabad, Divandarreh =

Heyatabad هيئت آباد
- Village
- Location within Iran
- Coordinates: 35°47′01″N 47°01′25″E
- Country: Iran
- Province: Kurdistan
- County: Divandarreh
- Bakhsh: Saral
- Rural District: Kowleh

Population (2006)
  - Total: 115
- Time zone: UTC+3:30 (IRST)
  - Summer (DST): UTC+4:30 (IRDT)

Heyatabad (Persian: هيئت آباد, also Romanized as Hey’atābād; also known as Bardeh Rash) is a village in Kowleh Rural District, Saral District, Divandarreh County, Kurdistan Province, Iran. At the 2006 census, its population was 115, in 22 families. The village is populated by Kurds.
