= Kulan, Kermanshah =

Kulan كولان
- Village
- Location within Iran
- Coordinates: 34°42′47″N 47°06′04″E
- Country: Iran
- Province: Kermanshah
- County: Kermanshah
- Bakhsh: Central
- Rural District: Poshtdarband

Population (2006)
  - Total: 265
- Time zone: UTC+3:30 (IRST)
  - Summer (DST): UTC+4:30 (IRDT)

Kulan (Kurdish: كووڵان، Kûlan, Persian: كولان, also Romanized as Kūlān) is a village in Poshtdarband Rural District, in the Central District of Kermanshah County, Kermanshah Province, Iran. At the 2006 census, its population was 265 in 62 families.
