= Buolhasan, Ilam =

Buolhasan بوالحسن
- Village
- Location within Iran
- Coordinates: 33°35′50″N 46°09′59″E
- Country: Iran
- Province: Ilam
- County: Ilam
- Bakhsh: Chavar
- Rural District: Arkavazi

Population (2006)
  - Total: 16
- Time zone: UTC+3:30 (IRST)
  - Summer (DST): UTC+4:30 (IRDT)

Buolhasan (Persian: بوالحسن, also Romanized as Būolḩasan; also known as Abū ol Ḩasan, Bolḩasan, and Qarīyeh Abū ol Ḩasan) is a village in Arkavazi Rural District, Chavar District, Ilam County, Ilam Province, Iran. At the 2006 census, its population was 16, in 4 families. The village is populated by Kurds.
