= Bardeh Rash-e Olya =

Bardeh Rash-e Olya برده رش عليا
- Village
- Location within Iran
- Coordinates: 34°44′44″N 46°23′05″E
- Country: Iran
- Province: Kermanshah
- County: Javanrud
- Bakhsh: Central
- Rural District: Bazan

Population (2006)
  - Total: 46
- Time zone: UTC+3:30 (IRST)
  - Summer (DST): UTC+4:30 (IRDT)

Bardeh Rash-e Olya (Persian: برده رش عليا, Sorani Kurdish: بەردەرەشی ژوورو, also Romanized as Bardeh Rash-e ‘Olyā) is a village in Bazan Rural District, in the Central District of Javanrud County, Kermanshah Province, Iran. At the 2006 census, its population was 46, in 9 families.
