= Lenjabad, Sanandaj =

Lenjabad لنج آباد
- Village
- Location within Iran
- Coordinates: 35°07′07″N 46°58′37″E
- Country: Iran
- Province: Kurdistan
- County: Sanandaj
- Bakhsh: Central
- Rural District: Naran

Population (2006)
  - Total: 273
- Time zone: UTC+3:30 (IRST)
  - Summer (DST): UTC+4:30 (IRDT)

Lenjabad (Persian: لنج آباد, also Romanized as Lenjābād and Lanjābād) is a village in Naran Rural District, in the Central District of Sanandaj County, Kurdistan Province, Iran. At the 2006 census, its population was 273, in 55 families. The village is populated by Kurds.
