= Bardeh Rasheh, Baneh =

Bardeh Rasheh برده رشه
- Village
- Location within Iran
- Coordinates: 35°59′12″N 45°48′18″E
- Country: Iran
- Province: Kurdistan
- County: Baneh
- Bakhsh: Central
- Rural District: Shuy

Population (2006)
  - Total: 44
- Time zone: UTC+3:30 (IRST)
  - Summer (DST): UTC+4:30 (IRDT)

Bardeh Rasheh (Persian: برده رشه; also known as Bardeh Rash and Barderash) is a village in Shuy Rural District, in the Central District of Baneh County, Kurdistan Province, Iran. At the 2006 census, its population was 44, in 8 families. The village is populated by Kurds.
