= Bowalhasan Rural District =

Rural district in Kurdistan province, Iran

Bowalhasan Rural District Persian: دهستان بوالحسن
- Rural District
- Location within Iran Location within Iran Kurdistan
- Coordinates: 35°59′N 45°39′E
- Country: Iran
- Province: Kurdistan
- County: Baneh
- District: Namshir
- Established: 1993
- Capital: Bowalhasan

Population (2016)
  - Total: 5,614
- Time zone: UTC+3:30 (IRST)

Bowalhasan Rural District (Persian: دهستان بوالحسن) is in Namshir District of Baneh County, Kurdistan province, Iran. Its capital is the village of Bowalhasan.

== Demographics ==
=== Population ===
At the time of the 2006 National Census, the rural district's population was 4,937 in 960 households. There were 4,527 inhabitants in 1,061 households at the following census of 2011. The 2016 census measured the population of the rural district as 5,614 in 1,571 households. The most populous of its 20 villages was Bowalhasan, with 1,298 people.

=== Other villages in the rural district ===
- Alut
- Anjineh-ye Ebrahim-e Shomali
- Anjineh-ye Sofla
- Bardeh Rash
- Chuman
- Gurehdar
- Zali
