= Kani Sur Rural District =

Rural district in Kurdistan province, Iran

Kani Sur Rural District Persian: دهستان كاني سور
- Rural District
- Location within Iran Location within Iran Kurdistan
- Coordinates: 36°04′N 45°43′E
- Country: Iran
- Province: Kurdistan
- County: Baneh
- District: Namshir
- Established: 1987
- Capital: Kani Sur

Population (2016)
  - Total: 5,435
- Time zone: UTC+3:30 (IRST)

Kani Sur Rural District (Persian: دهستان كاني سور) is in Namshir District of Baneh County, Kurdistan province, Iran. It is administered from the city of Kani Sur.

== Demographics ==
=== Population ===
At the time of the 2006 National Census, the rural district's population was 6,307 in 1,205 households. There were 5,765 inhabitants in 1,242 households at the following census of 2011. The 2016 census measured the population of the rural district as 5,435 in 1,533 households. The most populous of its 29 villages was Sivech-e Sofla, with 723 people.

=== Other villages in the rural district ===
- Mamal
- Owghal
- Seyyed Sarem
- Siahumeh
- Sivech-e Olya
- Zarvav-e Olya
- Zarvav-e Sofla
