= Zarivar Rural District =

Rural district in Kurdistan province, Iran

Zarivar Rural District Persian: دهستان زريوار
- Rural District
- Location within Iran Location within Iran Kurdistan
- Coordinates: 35°28′03″N 46°05′18″E
- Country: Iran
- Province: Kurdistan
- County: Marivan
- District: Central
- Capital: Ney

Population (2016)
  - Total: 9,828
- Time zone: UTC+3:30 (IRST)

Zarivar Rural District (Persian: دهستان زريوار) is in the Central District of Marivan County, Kurdistan province, Iran. Its capital is the village of Ney.

== Demographics ==
=== Population ===
At the time of the 2006 National Census, the rural district's population was 9,381 in 2,045 households. There were 9,773 inhabitants in 2,486 households at the following census of 2011. The 2016 census measured the population of the rural district as 9,828 in 2,720 households. The most populous of its 19 villages was Ney, with 2,691 people.
