= Nameh Shir Rural District =

Rural district in Kurdistan province, Iran

Nameh Shir Rural District Persian: دهستان نمه شير
- Rural District
- Location within Iran Location within Iran Kurdistan
- Coordinates: 36°08′N 45°45′E
- Country: Iran
- Province: Kurdistan
- County: Baneh
- District: Namshir
- Established: 1987
- Capital: Kukhan

Population (2016)
  - Total: 5,090
- Time zone: UTC+3:30 (IRST)

Nameh Shir Rural District (Persian: دهستان نمه شير) is in Namshir District of Baneh County, Kurdistan province, Iran. Its capital is the village of Kukhan.

== Demographics ==
=== Population ===
At the time of the 2006 National Census, the rural district's population was 6,643 in 1,157 households. There were 5,729 inhabitants in 1,219 households at the following census of 2011. The 2016 census measured the population of the rural district as 5,090 in 1,360 households. The most populous of its 24 villages was Najneh-ye Olya, with 688 people.

=== Other villages in the rural district ===
- Bardeh Rash
- Dul Arzan
- Manijalan
- Najneh-ye Sofla
- Sepidareh
- Ziviyeh
