= Kumasi Rural District =

Rural district in Kurdistan province, Iran

Kumasi Rural District Persian: دهستان كوماسي
- Rural District
- Location within Iran Location within Iran Kurdistan
- Coordinates: 35°25′08″N 46°27′08″E
- Country: Iran
- Province: Kurdistan
- County: Marivan
- District: Central
- Capital: Pir Khezran

Population (2016)
  - Total: 2,972
- Time zone: UTC+3:30 (IRST)

Kumasi Rural District (Persian: دهستان كوماسي) is in the Central District of Marivan County, Kurdistan province, Iran. Its capital is the village of Pir Khezran.

== Demographics ==
=== Population ===
At the time of the 2006 National Census, the rural district's population was 4,655 in 1,058 households. There were 3,586 inhabitants in 922 households at the following census of 2011. The 2016 census measured the population of the rural district as 2,972 in 853 households. The most populous of its 20 villages was Geleyeh, with 479 people.
