= Sarshiv Rural District =

Rural district in Kurdistan province, Iran

Sarshiv Rural District Persian: دهستان سرشيو
- Rural District
- Location within Iran Location within Iran Kurdistan
- Coordinates: 35°40′43″N 46°24′07″E
- Country: Iran
- Province: Kurdistan
- County: Marivan
- District: Sarshiv
- Capital: Chenareh

Population (2016)
  - Total: 3,876
- Time zone: UTC+3:30 (IRST)

Sarshiv Rural District (Persian: دهستان سرشيو) is in Sarshiv District of Marivan County, Kurdistan province, Iran. It is administered from the city of Chenareh.

== Demographics ==
=== Population ===
At the time of the 2006 National Census, the rural district's population was 5,321 in 1,081 households. There were 4,434 inhabitants in 1,006 households at the following census of 2011. The 2016 census measured the population of the rural district as 3,876 in 1,047 households. The most populous of its 30 villages was Gugjeh, with 336 people.
