= Gol-e Cheydar Rural District =

Rural district in Kurdistan province, Iran

Gol-e Cheydar Rural District Persian: دهستان گلچيدر
- Rural District
- Location within Iran Location within Iran Kurdistan
- Coordinates: 35°33′18″N 46°33′38″E
- Country: Iran
- Province: Kurdistan
- County: Marivan
- District: Sarshiv
- Capital: Janvareh-ye Khvarag

Population (2016)
  - Total: 3,593
- Time zone: UTC+3:30 (IRST)

Gol-e Cheydar Rural District (Persian: دهستان گلچيدر) is in Sarshiv District of Marivan County, Kurdistan province, Iran. Its capital is the village of Janvareh-ye Khvarag.

== Demographics ==
=== Population ===
At the time of the 2006 National Census, the rural district's population was 4,878 in 1,071 households. There were 4,421 inhabitants in 1,039 households at the following census of 2011. The 2016 census measured the population of the rural district as 3,593 in 970 households. The most populous of its 32 villages was Janvareh-ye Khvarag, with 909 people.
