= Sarkal Rural District =

Rural district in Kurdistan province, Iran

Sarkal Rural District Persian: دهستان سركل
- Rural District
- Location within Iran Location within Iran Kurdistan
- Coordinates: 35°29′53″N 46°15′22″E
- Country: Iran
- Province: Kurdistan
- County: Marivan
- District: Central
- Capital: Kani Dinar

Population (2016)
  - Total: 13,937
- Time zone: UTC+3:30 (IRST)

Sarkal Rural District (Persian: دهستان سركل) is in the Central District of Marivan County, Kurdistan province, Iran. It is administered from the city of Kani Dinar.

== Demographics ==
=== Population ===
At the time of the 2006 National Census, the rural district's population was 22,745 in 5,189 households. There were 13,086 inhabitants in 3,211 households at the following census of 2011. The 2016 census measured the population of the rural district as 13,937 in 3,811 households. The most populous of its 34 villages was Tazehabad, with 2,539 people.
