= Sarshiv District (Marivan County) =

District in Kurdistan province, Iran

Sarshiv District Persian: بخش سرشیو
- District
- Location within Iran Location within Iran Kurdistan
- Coordinates: 35°38′06″N 46°29′12″E
- Country: Iran
- Province: Kurdistan
- County: Marivan
- Capital: Chenareh

Population (2016)
  - Total: 7,924
- Time zone: UTC+3:30 (IRST)

Sarshiv District (Persian: بخش سرشیو) is in Marivan County, Kurdistan province, Iran. Its capital is the city of Chenareh.

== Demographics ==
=== Population ===
At the time of the 2006 National Census, the district's population was 10,632 in 2,253 households. The following census in 2011 counted 9,039 people in 2,086 households. The 2016 census measured the population of the district as 7,924 inhabitants in 2,143 households.

=== Administrative divisions ===
Sarshiv District Population
Administrative Divisions	2006	2011	2016
Gol-e Cheydar RD	4,878	4,421	3,593
Sarshiv RD	5,321	4,434	3,876
Chenareh (city)	433	184	455
Total	10,632	9,039	7,924
RD = Rural District
