= Central District (Marivan County) =

District in Kurdistan province, Iran

Central District (Marivan County) Persian: بخش مرکزی شهرستان مریوان
- District
- Location within Iran Location within Iran Kurdistan
- Coordinates: 35°29′00″N 46°15′46″E
- Country: Iran
- Province: Kurdistan
- County: Marivan
- Capital: Marivan

Population (2016)
  - Total: 176,450
- Time zone: UTC+3:30 (IRST)

The Central District of Marivan County (Persian: بخش مرکزی شهرستان مریوان) is in Kurdistan province, Iran. Its capital is the city of Marivan.

== History ==
After the 2006 National Census, the village of Kani Dinar was elevated to the status of a city.

== Demographics ==
=== Population ===
At the time of the 2006 census, the district's population was 128,445 in 30,732 households. The following census in 2011 counted 148,324 people in 39,482 households. The 2016 census measured the population of the district as 176,450 inhabitants in 50,506 households.

=== Administrative divisions ===
Central District (Marivan County) Population
Administrative Divisions	2006	2011	2016
Kumasi RD	4,655	3,586	2,972
Sarkal RD	22,745	13,086	13,937
Zarivar RD	9,381	9,773	9,828
Kani Dinar (city)		11,415	13,059
Marivan (city)	91,664	110,464	136,654
Total	128,445	148,324	176,450
RD = Rural District
