= Namshir District =

District in Kurdistan province, Iran

Namshir District Persian: بخش نمشیر
- District
- Location within Iran Location within Iran Kurdistan
- Coordinates: 36°04′N 45°42′E
- Country: Iran
- Province: Kurdistan
- County: Baneh
- Capital: Kani Sur

Population (2016)
  - Total: 17,423
- Time zone: UTC+3:30 (IRST)

Namshir District (Persian: بخش نمشیر) is in Baneh County, Kurdistan province, Iran. Its capital is the city of Kani Sur.

== Demographics ==
=== Population ===
At the time of the 2006 National Census, the district's population was 19,018 in 3,561 households. The following census in 2011 counted 17,328 people in 3,846 households. The 2016 census measured the population of the district as 17,423 inhabitants in 4,832 households.

=== Administrative divisions ===
Namshir District Population
Administrative Divisions	2006	2011	2016
Bowalhasan RD	4,937	4,527	5,614
Kani Sur RD	6,307	5,765	5,435
Nameh Shir RD	6,643	5,729	5,090
Kani Sur (city)	1,131	1,307	1,284
Total	19,018	17,328	17,423
RD = Rural District
