= Marivan County =

County in Kurdistan province, Iran

Marivan County Persian: شهرستان مریوان
- County
- Location of Marivan County in Kurdistan province

- Location of Kurdistan province in Iran
- Coordinates: 35°36′N 46°21′E
- Country: Iran
- Province: Kurdistan
- Capital: Marivan
- Districts: Central, Khav and Mirabad, Sarshiv

Population (2016)
  - Total: 195,263
- Time zone: UTC+3:30 (IRST)

Marivan County (Persian: شهرستان مریوان) (Note: Kurdish: شارستانی مەریوان) is in Kurdistan province, Iran. Its capital is the city of Marivan.

== History ==
Until 1958 the county was known as Marivan District, an administrative division of Sanandaj County. At that time, Kalatrazan District, Sarvabad County, and Sarshiv District were parts of Marivan District.

After the 2006 National Census, the village of Kani Dinar was elevated to the status of a city. After the 2011 census, the village of Bardeh Rasheh rose to city status as well.

== Demographics ==
=== Population ===
At the time of the 2006 census, the county's population was 150,926 in 35,498 households. The following census in 2011 counted 168,774 people in 44,258 households. The 2016 census measured the population of the county as 195,263 in 55,603 households. Of these, 151,188 lived in urban centers while 44,075 lived in rural regions; 99,956 were male and 95,307 were female.

=== Administrative divisions ===
Marivan County's population history and administrative structure over three consecutive censuses are shown in the following table.

Marivan County Population
| Administrative Divisions | 2006 | 2011 | 2016 |
|---|---|---|---|
| Central District | 128,445 | 148,324 | 176,450 |
| Kumasi RD | 4,655 | 3,586 | 2,972 |
| Sarkal RD | 22,745 | 13,086 | 13,937 |
| Zarivar RD | 9,381 | 9,773 | 9,828 |
| Kani Dinar (city) | | 11,415 | 13,059 |
| Marivan (city) | 91,664 | 110,464 | 136,654 |
| Khav and Mirabad District | 11,849 | 11,411 | 10,888 |
| Khav and Mirabad RD | 11,849 | 11,411 | 9,868 |
| Bardeh Rasheh (city) | | | 1,020 |
| Sarshiv District | 10,632 | 9,039 | 7,924 |
| Gol-e Cheydar RD | 4,878 | 4,421 | 3,593 |
| Sarshiv RD | 5,321 | 4,434 | 3,876 |
| Chenareh (city) | 433 | 184 | 455 |
| Total | 150,926 | 168,774 | 195,263 |
RD = Rural District

== Geography ==
Marivan County is bordered by Saqqez County to the north, Sanandaj County to the east and southeast, Paveh County to the south, and Iraq to the west and northwest.

== See also ==
Media related to Marivan County at Wikimedia Commons
