= Kukh =

Kukh (Persian: كوخ) may refer to:

- Kukh Sar Tazin
- Kukh Sheykh ol Eslam
- Kukh-e Hajji Karim
- Kukh-e Kani Guyz
- Kukh-e Mamu
- Kukh-e Sufi Rashi Piruz
