= Kani Sib =

Kani Sib (Persian: كاني سيب) may refer to:

- Kani Sib, Alut, Baneh County, Kurdistan Province
- Kani Sib, Namshir, Baneh County, Kurdistan Province
- Kani Sib, Mahabad, West Azerbaijan Province
- Kani Sib, Piranshahr, West Azerbaijan Province
- Kani Sib, Sardasht, West Azerbaijan Province
