= Surehban =

Surehban or Surrehban (Persian: سوره بان) may refer to:

- Surehban, Kurdistan
- Surehban, Sanandaj, Kurdistan Province
- Surehban, West Azerbaijan
- Surehban, Urmia, West Azerbaijan Province
