= Kani Benav =

Village in Kurdistan province, Iran

Kani Benav Persian: كاني بناو
- Village
- Location within Iran Location within Iran Kurdistan
- Coordinates: 35°57′07″N 45°49′54″E
- Country: Iran
- Province: Kurdistan
- County: Baneh
- District: Armardeh
- Rural District: Posht-e Arbaba

Population (2016)
  - Total: Below reporting threshold
- Time zone: UTC+3:30 (IRST)

Kani Benav (Persian: كاني بناو) (Note: Also romanized as Kānī Benāv) is a village in Posht-e Arbaba Rural District of Armardeh District (Note: Formerly Alut District) in Baneh County, Kurdistan province, Iran.

== Demographics ==
=== Ethnicity ===
The village is populated by Kurds.

=== Population ===
At the time of the 2006 National Census, the village's population was 27 in four households. The following censuses in 2011 and 2016 counted a population below the reporting threshold.
