= Kani Seyf =

Kani Seyf (Persian: كاني سيف) may refer to:

- Kani Seyf, Alut
- Kani Seyf, Nanur
