= Zarboneh =

Village in Kurdistan province, Iran

Zarboneh Persian: زربنه
- Village
- Location within Iran Location within Iran Kurdistan
- Coordinates: 35°58′32″N 45°42′24″E
- Country: Iran
- Province: Kurdistan
- County: Baneh
- District: Armardeh
- Rural District: Posht-e Arbaba

Population (2016)
  - Total: 120
- Time zone: UTC+3:30 (IRST)

Zarboneh (Persian: زربنه) (Note: Also known as Zarrowboneh) is a village in Posht-e Arbaba Rural District of Armardeh District (Note: Formerly Alut District) in Baneh County, Kurdistan province, Iran.

== Demographics ==
=== Ethnicity ===
The village is populated by Kurds.

=== Population ===
At the time of the 2006 National Census, the village's population was 144 in 26 households. The following census in 2011 counted 107 people in 20 households. The 2016 census measured the population of the village as 120 people in 33 households.
