= Deymeh, Kurdistan =

Village in Kurdistan province, Iran

Deymeh Persian: ديمه
- Village
- Location within Iran Location within Iran Kurdistan
- Coordinates: 35°56′02″N 45°45′20″E
- Country: Iran
- Province: Kurdistan
- County: Baneh
- District: Armardeh
- Rural District: Posht-e Arbaba

Population (2016)
  - Total: 31
- Time zone: UTC+3:30 (IRST)

Deymeh (Persian: ديمه) (Note: Also known as Deymeh-ye Pā’īn) is a village in Posht-e Arbaba Rural District of Armardeh District (Note: Formerly Alut District) in Baneh County, Kurdistan province, Iran.

== Demographics ==
=== Ethnicity ===
The village is populated by Kurds.

=== Population ===
At the time of the 2006 National Census, the village's population was 41 in eight households. The following census in 2011 counted 31 people in six households. The 2016 census measured the population of the village again as 31 people in six households.
