= Nowdeh, Kurdistan =

Village in Kurdistan province, Iran

Nowdeh Persian: نوده
- Village
- Location within Iran Location within Iran Kurdistan
- Coordinates: 35°56′09″N 45°52′53″E
- Country: Iran
- Province: Kurdistan
- County: Baneh
- District: Armardeh
- Rural District: Posht-e Arbaba

Population (2016)
  - Total: 172
- Time zone: UTC+3:30 (IRST)

Nowdeh (Persian: نوده) is a village in Posht-e Arbaba Rural District of Armardeh District (Note: Formerly Alut District) in Baneh County, Kurdistan province, Iran.

== Demographics ==
=== Ethnicity ===
The village is populated by Kurds.

=== Population ===
At the time of the 2006 National Census, the village's population was 184 in 30 households. The following census in 2011 counted 177 people in 31 households. The 2016 census measured the population of the village as 172 people in 37 households.
