= Kuk =

Kuk may refer to:

== Places ==
- Kuk, Tomislavgrad, a village in Bosnia and Herzegovina
- Kûk or Kuuk, a former settlement in Greenland
- Kuk Swamp, an archaeological site in New Guinea
- Kuk River, in Alaska, United States
- Kuk, Tolmin, a settlement in Slovenia
- Mount Kuk, a mountain in Slovenia

== Language ==
- A Norwegian profanity and Swedish profanity for male genitalia
- Kepoʼ language (ISO 639-3: kuk) of Flores, Indonesia, in the Malayo-Polynesian family
- Kuk language (ISO 639-3: kfn) of Cameroon, in the Grassfields Bantu branch of the Benue–Congo family

== Government ==
- Heung Yee Kuk, an advisory body for the New Territories, Hong Kong, colloquially known as "The Kuk"
- Kaiserlich und königlich ("imperial and royal", abbreviated k.u.k.), referring to the Austro-Hungarian Empire, or the Court of the Habsburgs

== Other uses ==
- Georg Kükenthal (1864–1955), German pastor and botanist with standard botanical author abbreviation Kük
- Kasigluk Airport (IATA: KUK), Alaska, United States
- Kuk or Kek (mythology), the deification of the primordial concept of darkness in ancient Egyptian mythology
- Kurukshetra University, Kurukshetra (KUK), Haryana, India

== See also ==
- , including many personal names
- Kukh (disambiguation)
