= Garmab, Baneh =

Village in Kurdistan province, Iran

Garmab Persian: گرماب
- Village
- Location within Iran Location within Iran Kurdistan
- Coordinates: 35°54′28″N 45°43′20″E
- Country: Iran
- Province: Kurdistan
- County: Baneh
- District: Armardeh
- Rural District: Beleh Keh

Population (2016)
  - Total: 123
- Time zone: UTC+3:30 (IRST)

Garmab (Persian: گرماب) (Note: Also romanized as Garmāb) is a village in Beleh Keh Rural District of Armardeh District (Note: Formerly Alut District) in Baneh County, Kurdistan province, Iran.

== Demographics ==
=== Ethnicity ===
The village is populated by Kurds.

=== Population ===
At the time of the 2006 National Census, the village's population was 188 in 38 households. The following census in 2011 counted 109 people in 24 households. The 2016 census measured the population of the village as 123 people in 31 households.
