= Ka Rostam =

Village in Kurdistan province, Iran

Ka Rostam Persian: كارستم
- Village
- Location within Iran Location within Iran Kurdistan
- Coordinates: 35°53′18″N 45°49′05″E
- Country: Iran
- Province: Kurdistan
- County: Baneh
- District: Armardeh
- Rural District: Posht-e Arbaba

Population (2016)
  - Total: 49
- Time zone: UTC+3:30 (IRST)

Ka Rostam (Persian: كارستم) (Note: Also romanized as Kā Rostam; also known as Kāh Rustam) is a village in Posht-e Arbaba Rural District of Armardeh District (Note: Formerly Alut District) in Baneh County, Kurdistan province, Iran.

== Demographics ==
=== Ethnicity ===
The village is populated by Kurds.

=== Population ===
At the time of the 2006 National Census, the village's population was 140 in 25 households. The following census in 2011 counted 106 people in 23 households. The 2016 census measured the population of the village as 49 people in 11 households.
