= Kani Ebrahim =

Village in Kurdistan province, Iran

Kani Ebrahim Persian: كاني ابراهيم
- Village
- Location within Iran Location within Iran Kurdistan
- Coordinates: 35°56′37″N 45°41′11″E
- Country: Iran
- Province: Kurdistan
- County: Baneh
- District: Armardeh
- Rural District: Posht-e Arbaba

Population (2016)
  - Total: 24
- Time zone: UTC+3:30 (IRST)

Kani Ebrahim (Persian: كاني ابراهيم) (Note: Also romanized as Kānī Ebrāhīm) is a village in Posht-e Arbaba Rural District of Armardeh District (Note: Formerly Alut District) in Baneh County, Kurdistan province, Iran.

== Demographics ==
=== Population ===
At the time of the 2006 National Census, the village's population was below the reporting threshold. The 2016 census measured the population of the village as 24 people in seven households.
