= Kani Bid =

Village in Kurdistan province, Iran

Kani Bid Persian: كاني بيد
- Village
- Location within Iran Location within Iran Kurdistan
- Coordinates: 36°00′08″N 45°41′48″E
- Country: Iran
- Province: Kurdistan
- County: Baneh
- District: Armardeh
- Rural District: Posht-e Arbaba

Population (2016)
  - Total: 65
- Time zone: UTC+3:30 (IRST)

Kani Bid (Persian: كاني بيد) (Note: Also romanized as Kānī Bīd) is a village in Posht-e Arbaba Rural District of Armardeh District (Note: Formerly Alut District) in Baneh County, Kurdistan province, Iran.

== Demographics ==
=== Ethnicity ===
The village is populated by Kurds.

=== Population ===
At the time of the 2006 National Census, the village's population was 46 in eight households. The following census in 2011 counted 34 people in seven households. The 2016 census measured the population of the village as 65 people in 20 households.
