= Cherush =

Village in Kurdistan province, Iran

Cherush Persian: چروش
- Village
- Location within Iran Location within Iran Kurdistan
- Coordinates: 35°57′18″N 45°42′02″E
- Country: Iran
- Province: Kurdistan
- County: Baneh
- District: Armardeh
- Rural District: Posht-e Arbaba

Population (2016)
  - Total: 28
- Time zone: UTC+3:30 (IRST)

Cherush (Persian: چروش) (Note: Also romanized as Cherūsh) is a village in Posht-e Arbaba Rural District of Armardeh District (Note: Formerly Alut District) in Baneh County, Kurdistan province, Iran.

== Demographics ==
=== Population ===
At the time of the 2006 National Census, the village's population was below the reporting threshold. The following census in 2011 counted 43 people in 10 households. The 2016 census measured the population of the village as 28 people in eight households.
