= Tazhan =

Village in Kurdistan province, Iran

Tazhan Persian: تاژان
- Village
- Location within Iran Location within Iran Kurdistan
- Coordinates: 35°56′55″N 45°44′58″E
- Country: Iran
- Province: Kurdistan
- County: Baneh
- District: Armardeh
- Rural District: Posht-e Arbaba

Population (2016)
  - Total: 225
- Time zone: UTC+3:30 (IRST)

Tazhan (Persian: تاژان) (Note: Also romanized as Tāzhān; also known as Nāzhān) is a village in Posht-e Arbaba Rural District of Armardeh District (Note: Formerly Alut District) in Baneh County, Kurdistan province, Iran.

== Demographics ==
=== Ethnicity ===
The village is populated by Kurds.

=== Population ===
At the time of the 2006 National Census, the village's population was 258 in 46 households. The following census in 2011 counted 274 people in 62 households. The 2016 census measured the population of the village as 225 people in 65 households.
