= Atabak, Kurdistan =

Village in Kurdistan province, Iran

Atabak Persian: اتابك
- Village
- Location within Iran Location within Iran Kurdistan
- Coordinates: 35°57′33″N 45°45′40″E
- Country: Iran
- Province: Kurdistan
- County: Baneh
- District: Armardeh
- Rural District: Posht-e Arbaba

Population (2016)
  - Total: Below reporting threshold
- Time zone: UTC+3:30 (IRST)

Atabak (Persian: اتابك) (Note: Also romanized as Atābak) is a village in Posht-e Arbaba Rural District of Armardeh District (Note: Formerly Alut District) in Baneh County, Kurdistan province, Iran.

== Demographics ==
=== Ethnicity ===
The village is populated by Kurds.

=== Population ===
At the time of the 2006 National Census, the village's population was 27 in five households. The following census in 2011 counted 12 people in four households. The 2016 census measured the population of the village as below the reporting threshold.
