= Kandeh Sureh =

Kandeh Sureh (Persian: كنده سوره) may refer to:

- Kandeh Sureh, Baneh
- Kandeh Sureh, Saqqez
