= Kani Mamer =

Village in Kurdistan province, Iran

Kani Mamer Persian: كاني مامر
- Village
- Location within Iran Location within Iran Kurdistan
- Coordinates: 35°52′21″N 45°44′36″E
- Country: Iran
- Province: Kurdistan
- County: Baneh
- District: Armardeh
- Rural District: Beleh Keh

Population (2016)
  - Total: 45
- Time zone: UTC+3:30 (IRST)

Kani Mamer (Persian: كاني مامر) (Note: Also romanized as Kānī Māmar and Kanī Māmer; also known as Khānī Moḩammad and Khani Muhammad) is a village in Beleh Keh Rural District of Armardeh District (Note: Formerly Alut District) in Baneh County, Kurdistan province, Iran.

== Demographics ==
=== Ethnicity ===
The village is populated by Kurds.

=== Population ===
At the time of the 2006 National Census, the village's population was 47 in nine households. The following census in 2011 counted 34 people in six households. The 2016 census measured the population of the village as 45 people in nine households.
