= Tavakkol, Kurdistan =

Village in Kurdistan province, Iran

Tavakkol Persian: توكل
- Village
- Location within Iran Location within Iran Kurdistan
- Coordinates: 35°57′14″N 45°46′27″E
- Country: Iran
- Province: Kurdistan
- County: Baneh
- District: Armardeh
- Rural District: Posht-e Arbaba

Population (2016)
  - Total: 220
- Time zone: UTC+3:30 (IRST)

Tavakkol (Persian: توكل) is a village in Posht-e Arbaba Rural District of Armardeh District (Note: Formerly Alut District) in Baneh County, Kurdistan province, Iran.

== Demographics ==
=== Ethnicity ===
The village is populated by Kurds.

=== Population ===
At the time of the 2006 National Census, the village's population was 220 in 41 households. The following census in 2011 counted 231 people in 40 households. The 2016 census measured the population of the village as 220 people in 55 households.
