= Kani Goli =

Village in Kurdistan province, Iran

Kani Goli Persian: كاني گلي
- Village
- Country: Iran
- Province: Kurdistan
- County: Baneh
- District: Armardeh
- Rural District: Posht-e Arbaba

Population (2016)
  - Total: 36
- Time zone: UTC+3:30 (IRST)

Kani Goli (Persian: كاني گلي) (Note: Also romanized as Kānī Golī) is a village in Posht-e Arbaba Rural District of Armardeh District (Note: Formerly Alut District) in Baneh County, Kurdistan province, Iran.

== Demographics ==
=== Ethnicity ===
The village is populated by Kurds.

=== Population ===
At the time of the 2006 National Census, the village's population was 51 in 12 households. The following census in 2011 counted 21 people in five households. The 2016 census measured the population of the village as 36 people in 10 households.
