= Sardav =

Village in Kurdistan province, Iran

Sardav Persian: سرداو
- Village
- Location within Iran Location within Iran Kurdistan
- Coordinates: 35°50′12″N 45°49′48″E
- Country: Iran
- Province: Kurdistan
- County: Baneh
- District: Armardeh
- Rural District: Beleh Keh

Population (2016)
  - Total: 246
- Time zone: UTC+3:30 (IRST)

Sardav (Persian: سرداو) (Note: Also romanized as Sardāv; also known as Sardāb) is a village in Beleh Keh Rural District of Armardeh District (Note: Formerly Alut District) in Baneh County, Kurdistan province, Iran.

== Demographics ==
=== Ethnicity ===
The village is populated by Kurds.

=== Population ===
At the time of the 2006 National Census, the village's population was 361 in 70 households. The following census in 2011 counted 289 people in 63 households. The 2016 census measured the population of the village as 246 people in 71 households.
