= Bayazidabad, Baneh =

Village in Kurdistan province, Iran

Bayazidabad Persian: بايزيد آباد
- Village
- Location within Iran Location within Iran Kurdistan
- Coordinates: 35°57′32″N 45°51′16″E
- Country: Iran
- Province: Kurdistan
- County: Baneh
- District: Armardeh
- Rural District: Posht-e Arbaba

Population (2016)
  - Total: 131
- Time zone: UTC+3:30 (IRST)

Bayazidabad (Persian: بايزيد آباد) (Note: Also romanized as Bāyazīdābād; also known as Batzābād and Bāyzāveh) is a village in Posht-e Arbaba Rural District of Armardeh District (Note: Formerly Alut District) in Baneh County, Kurdistan province, Iran.

== Demographics ==
=== Ethnicity ===
The village is populated by Kurds.

=== Population ===
At the time of the 2006 National Census, the village's population was 142 in 25 households. The following census in 2011 counted 129 people in 30 households. The 2016 census measured the population of the village as 131 people in 33 households.
