= Beleh Keh =

Village in Kurdistan province, Iran

Beleh Keh Persian: بله كه
- Village
- Location within Iran Location within Iran Kurdistan
- Coordinates: 35°51′43″N 45°45′51″E
- Country: Iran
- Province: Kurdistan
- County: Baneh
- District: Armardeh
- Rural District: Beleh Keh

Population (2016)
  - Total: 716
- Time zone: UTC+3:30 (IRST)

Beleh Keh (Persian: بله كه) (Note: Also known as Balkeh) is a village in, and the capital of, Beleh Keh Rural District in Armardeh District (Note: Formerly Alut District) of Baneh County, Kurdistan province, Iran.

== Demographics ==
=== Ethnicity ===
The village is populated by Kurds.

=== Population ===
At the time of the 2006 National Census, the village's population was 729 in 143 households. The following census in 2011 counted 700 people in 158 households. The 2016 census measured the population of the village as 716 people in 186 households.
