= Dowleh Guyer =

Village in Kurdistan province, Iran

Dowleh Guyer Persian: دوله گوير
- Village
- Location within Iran Location within Iran Kurdistan
- Coordinates: 35°54′03″N 45°48′17″E
- Country: Iran
- Province: Kurdistan
- County: Baneh
- District: Armardeh
- Rural District: Posht-e Arbaba

Population (2016)
  - Total: 75
- Time zone: UTC+3:30 (IRST)

Dowleh Guyer (Persian: دوله گوير) (Note: Also romanized as Dowleh Gūyer; also known as Dalkūr, Delgūr, and Dūlagūyer) is a village in Posht-e Arbaba Rural District of Armardeh District (Note: Formerly Alut District) in Baneh County, Kurdistan province, Iran.

== Demographics ==
=== Ethnicity ===
The village is populated by Kurds.

=== Population ===
At the time of the 2006 National Census, the village's population was 115 in 18 households. The following census in 2011 counted 93 people in 19 households. The 2016 census measured the population of the village as 75 people in 23 households.
