= Mir Hesam =

Village in Kurdistan province, Iran

Mir Hesam Persian: ميرحسام
- Village
- Location within Iran Location within Iran Kurdistan
- Coordinates: 35°55′48″N 45°51′30″E
- Country: Iran
- Province: Kurdistan
- County: Baneh
- District: Armardeh
- Rural District: Posht-e Arbaba

Population (2016)
  - Total: 103
- Time zone: UTC+3:30 (IRST)

Mir Hesam (Persian: ميرحسام) (Note: Also romanized as Mīr Ḩesām) is a village in Posht-e Arbaba Rural District of Armardeh District (Note: Formerly Alut District) in Baneh County, Kurdistan province, Iran.

== Demographics ==
=== Ethnicity ===
The village is populated by Kurds.

=== Population ===
At the time of the 2006 National Census, the village's population was 111 in 17 households. The following census in 2011 counted 80 people in 18 households. The 2016 census measured the population of the village as 103 people in 31 households.
