= Sisarak =

Village in Kurdistan province, Iran

Sisarak Persian: سيسارك
- Village
- Location within Iran Location within Iran Kurdistan
- Coordinates: 35°53′11″N 45°44′37″E
- Country: Iran
- Province: Kurdistan
- County: Baneh
- District: Armardeh
- Rural District: Beleh Keh

Population (2016)
  - Total: 58
- Time zone: UTC+3:30 (IRST)

Sisarak (Persian: سيسارك) (Note: Also romanized as Sīsārak; also known as Sīsārag) is a village in Beleh Keh Rural District of Armardeh District (Note: Formerly Alut District) in Baneh County, Kurdistan province, Iran.

== Demographics ==
=== Ethnicity ===
The village is populated by Kurds.

=== Population ===
At the time of the 2006 National Census, the village's population was 56 in 13 households. The following census in 2011 counted 50 people in 16 households. The 2016 census measured the population of the village as 58 people in 18 households.
