= Baraver =

Village in Kurdistan province, Iran

Baraver Persian: بار آور
- Village
- Country: Iran
- Province: Kurdistan
- County: Baneh
- District: Armardeh
- Rural District: Posht-e Arbaba

Population (2016)
  - Total: 50
- Time zone: UTC+3:30 (IRST)

Baraver (Persian: بار آور) (Note: Also romanized as Bārāver) is a village in Posht-e Arbaba Rural District of Armardeh District (Note: Formerly Alut District) in Baneh County, Kurdistan province, Iran.

== Demographics ==
=== Ethnicity ===
The village is populated by Kurds.

=== Population ===
At the time of the 2006 National Census, the village's population was 71 in 11 households. The following census in 2011 counted 59 people in 10 households. The 2016 census measured the population of the village as 50 people in 13 households.
