= Kani Band =

Kani Band (Persian: كاني بند) may refer to:

- Kani Band, Baneh
- Kani Band, Saqqez
