= Vazheh =

Village in Kurdistan province, Iran

Vazheh Persian: واژه
- Village
- Location within Iran Location within Iran Kurdistan
- Coordinates: 35°58′51″N 45°42′44″E
- Country: Iran
- Province: Kurdistan
- County: Baneh
- District: Armardeh
- Rural District: Posht-e Arbaba

Population (2016)
  - Total: 45
- Time zone: UTC+3:30 (IRST)

Vazheh (Persian: واژه) (Note: Also romanized as Vāzheh) is a village in Posht-e Arbaba Rural District of Armardeh District (Note: Formerly Alut District) in Baneh County, Kurdistan province, Iran.

== Demographics ==
=== Ethnicity ===
The village is populated by Kurds.

=== Population ===
At the time of the 2006 National Census, the village's population was 30 in seven households. The following census in 2011 counted 24 people in five households. The 2016 census measured the population of the village as 45 people in 14 households.
