= Neyzeh Rud =

Village in Kurdistan province, Iran

Neyzeh Rud Persian: نيزه رود
- Village
- Location within Iran Location within Iran Kurdistan
- Coordinates: 35°57′41″N 45°49′14″E
- Country: Iran
- Province: Kurdistan
- County: Baneh
- District: Armardeh
- Rural District: Posht-e Arbaba

Population (2016)
  - Total: 229
- Time zone: UTC+3:30 (IRST)

Neyzeh Rud (Persian: نيزه رود) (Note: Also romanized as Neyzeh Rūd) is a village in Posht-e Arbaba Rural District of Armardeh District (Note: Formerly Alut District) in Baneh County, Kurdistan province, Iran.

== Demographics ==
=== Ethnicity ===
The village is populated by Kurds.

=== Population ===
At the time of the 2006 National Census, the village's population was 307 in 59 households. The following census in 2011 counted 253 people in 62 households. The 2016 census measured the population of the village as 229 people in 63 households.
