= Mucheh =

Village in Kurdistan province, Iran

Mucheh Persian: موچه
- Village
- Location within Iran Location within Iran Kurdistan
- Coordinates: 35°56′50″N 45°41′38″E
- Country: Iran
- Province: Kurdistan
- County: Baneh
- District: Armardeh
- Rural District: Posht-e Arbaba

Population (2016)
  - Total: 12
- Time zone: UTC+3:30 (IRST)

Mucheh (Persian: موچه) (Note: Also romanized as Mūcheh) is a village in Posht-e Arbaba Rural District of Armardeh District (Note: Formerly Alut District) in Baneh County, Kurdistan province, Iran.

== Demographics ==
=== Population ===
At the time of the 2006 National Census, the village's population was below the reporting threshold. The following census in 2011 counted 24 people in six households. The 2016 census measured the population of the village as 41 people in 38 households.
