= Tazhban =

Village in Kurdistan province, Iran

Tazhban Persian: تاژبان
- Village
- Location within Iran Location within Iran Kurdistan
- Coordinates: 35°56′59″N 45°42′14″E
- Country: Iran
- Province: Kurdistan
- County: Baneh
- District: Armardeh
- Rural District: Posht-e Arbaba

Population (2016)
  - Total: 194
- Time zone: UTC+3:30 (IRST)

Tazhban (Persian: تاژبان) (Note: Also romanized as Tāzhbān) is a village in Posht-e Arbaba Rural District of Armardeh District (Note: Formerly Alut District) in Baneh County, Kurdistan province, Iran.

== Demographics ==
=== Ethnicity ===
The village is populated by Kurds.

=== Population ===
At the time of the 2006 National Census, the village's population was 153 in 31 households. The following census in 2011 counted 153 people in 35 households. The 2016 census measured the population of the village as 194 people in 56 households.
