= Lorena Mandacawan =

Filipina activist for Manobo rights

Lorena Mandacawan is a Matigsalog Manobo activist and spokesperson for the Salugpongan Schools' Parent Teachers Community Association. She also serves as a Barangay Health Worker (BHW), and is the chairperson of Sabokahan (Unity of Lumad Women). She has spoken against efforts to close Salugpongan schools, against sexual harassment and threats from the military, and against the sexist attitudes propagated by President Duterte.

== Personal life ==
Mandacawan has 7 children.

== Environmentalism and defense of women ==
As chairperson of Sabokahan, Mandacawan called on women of the world to unite in resisting "imperialist plunder" of the environment. She accused state forces of employing physical and sexual violence against Lumad women in the hinterlands. The women, she says, were accused of association with communist rebels. Meanwhile, her community protested against intrusion in their ancestral domain by mining and logging. (See Environmental impact of mining, Deforestation in the Philippines, and Environmental issues in the Philippines.)

== Manobo refugee flight ==
Mandacawan and her family were part of the Manobo exodus from Talaingod to the United Church of Christ in the Philippines (UCCP) Haran Evacuation Center in Davao City, fleeing due to threats from Alamara, a paramilitary organization that accused her family of supporting the New People's Army (NPA). The community and their schools had also been attacked by the military, and had fled there from Talaingod and Kapalong in Davao del Norte and from Arakan in Cotabato.

Over 500 internally displaced Lumad refugees were seeking sanctuary at the UCCP compound when it was subject to an order to close by the Regional Peace and Order Council of Region 12. Her nephew Obella Bay-ao had been shot and killed by members of Alamara in 2017, accused of being a member of the NPA. He was in 6th grade.

She leads a group of women BHWs serving the community at the evacuation center and serves as the group's spokesperson. In 2020 during the COVID-19 pandemic, while leading the health committee inside the sanctuary, which housed about 350 children and adolescents, she organized disinfection and quarantine measures. The local government had offered the refugees no aid. The community also struggled with hunger, as the enhanced quarantine threatened their food supply, which they supplemented through backyard gardening.

== Salugpongan school closure ==
After 19 Lumad students were supposedly rescued from a "bakwit" school at the University of San Carlos (USC) in Balamban, Cebu City, on 15 February 2021, Mandacawan confirmed, as one of the parents, that their children had been sent to study in Cebu with their consent after the government closed the Salugpongan school in their hometown. In an official statement, Philippine National Police chief Gen. Debold Sinas had described the transfer as having been done without the knowledge of the parents, and that the children had been "undergoing some form of radicalization and revolutionary warfare indoctrination." Lumad educational institutions, including the Salugpongan schools built by community without government support, have been accused by the military of serving as recruitment fronts for the NPA. The UN Commission on Human Rights stated that it found no evidence of communist indoctrination at the USC campus, and in response to the police, Mandacawan denied association with the NPA, describing the government's actions as red-tagging. She defended her community's right to education, upholding it as a means to defend their ancestral lands from exploitation for natural resources. (See Free, prior and informed consent.)

The schools had been built by the community, starting in 2003 when the Salugpongan sought the Catholic Rural Missionaries of the Philippines in the village of Palma Gil. The organization continued to build 54 school campuses, spread from Talaingod to faraway municipalities of Southern Mindanao. The Department of Education recognized indigenous schools, including the Salugpongan Community Learning Center, in 2014, under Department Order 21: Guidelines on the Recognition of Private Learning Institutions Serving Indigenous Peoples Learners, which recognized nongovernment and community-led institutions. The organization behind the 54 schools, Salugpongan Community Learning School, was named for the organization of Talaingod chieftains, Salugpongan Ta Tanu Igkanogon (Unity in Defense of Ancestral Domain).
