= Saluk (disambiguation) =

Saluk is a village in Hamadan Province, Iran.

Saluk (Persian: سالوك), also rendered as Salug, may also refer to:

- Saluk-e Olya, Kurdistan Province
- Saluk-e Sofla, Kurdistan Province

== See also ==
- Salug (disambiguation)
- Sa'luk, a character in Disney's Aladdin
