= Masidar =

Village in Kurdistan province, Iran

Masidar Persian: ماسي در
- Village
- Location within Iran Location within Iran Kurdistan
- Coordinates: 35°57′21″N 45°50′34″E
- Country: Iran
- Province: Kurdistan
- County: Baneh
- District: Armardeh
- Rural District: Posht-e Arbaba

Population (2016)
  - Total: 14
- Time zone: UTC+3:30 (IRST)

Masidar (Persian: ماسي در) (Note: Also romanized as Māsīdar and Masider; also known as Māhīdar) is a village in Posht-e Arbaba Rural District of Armardeh District (Note: Formerly Alut District) in Baneh County, Kurdistan province, Iran.

== Demographics ==
=== Ethnicity ===
The village is populated by Kurds.

=== Population ===
At the time of the 2006 National Census, the village's population was 34 in seven households. The following census in 2011 counted a population below the reporting threshold. The 2016 census measured the population of the village as 14 people in five households.
