= Guil, Iran =

Village in Kurdistan province, Iran

Guil Persian: گوئيل
- Village
- Location within Iran Location within Iran Kurdistan
- Coordinates: 35°57′53″N 45°44′03″E
- Country: Iran
- Province: Kurdistan
- County: Baneh
- District: Armardeh
- Rural District: Posht-e Arbaba

Population (2016)
  - Total: 85
- Time zone: UTC+3:30 (IRST)

Guil (Persian: گوئيل) (Note: Also romanized as Gū'īl; also known as Gavīl) is a village in Posht-e Arbaba Rural District of Armardeh District (Note: Formerly Alut District) in Baneh County, Kurdistan province, Iran.

== Demographics ==
=== Ethnicity ===
The village is populated by Kurds.

=== Population ===
At the time of the 2006 National Census, the village's population was 99 in 21 households. The following census in 2011 counted 84 people in 18 households. The 2016 census measured the population of the village as 85 people in 21 households.
