= Kani Guyz =

Village in Kurdistan province, Iran

Kani Guyz Persian: كاني گويز
- Village
- Location within Iran Location within Iran Kurdistan
- Coordinates: 35°57′33″N 45°52′27″E
- Country: Iran
- Province: Kurdistan
- County: Baneh
- District: Armardeh
- Rural District: Posht-e Arbaba

Population (2016)
  - Total: 376
- Time zone: UTC+3:30 (IRST)

Kani Guyz (Persian: كاني گويز) (Note: Also romanized as Kānī Gūyz; also known as Kani Gwez) is a village in Posht-e Arbaba Rural District of Armardeh District (Note: Formerly Alut District) in Baneh County, Kurdistan province, Iran.

== Demographics ==
=== Ethnicity ===
The village is populated by Kurds.

=== Population ===
At the time of the 2006 National Census, the village's population was 500 in 93 households. The following census in 2011 counted 413 people in 92 households. The 2016 census measured the population of the village as 376 people in 101 households, the most populous in its rural district.
