= Qarah Bolagh, Baneh =

Village in Kurdistan province, Iran

Qarah Bolagh Persian: قره بلاغ
- Village
- Location within Iran Location within Iran Kurdistan
- Coordinates: 35°57′54″N 45°50′18″E
- Country: Iran
- Province: Kurdistan
- County: Baneh
- District: Armardeh
- Rural District: Posht-e Arbaba

Population (2016)
  - Total: 52
- Time zone: UTC+3:30 (IRST)

Qarah Bolagh (Persian: قره بلاغ) (Note: Also romanized as Qarah Bolāgh and Qareh Bolāgh) is a village in Posht-e Arbaba Rural District of Armardeh District (Note: Formerly Alut District) in Baneh County, Kurdistan province, Iran.

== Demographics ==
=== Ethnicity ===
The village is populated by Kurds.

=== Population ===
At the time of the 2006 National Census, the village's population was 55 in seven households. The following census in 2011 counted 52 people in 11 households. The 2016 census measured the population of the village as 52 people in 13 households.
