= Surban =

Surban (Persian: سوربان) may refer to:

- Surban, East Azerbaijan
- Surban, Kurdistan
- Surban, West Azerbaijan
