= Gandoman, Baneh =

Village in Kurdistan province, Iran

Gandoman Persian: گندمان
- Village
- Location within Iran Location within Iran Kurdistan
- Coordinates: 35°55′00″N 45°49′06″E
- Country: Iran
- Province: Kurdistan
- County: Baneh
- District: Armardeh
- Rural District: Posht-e Arbaba

Population (2016)
  - Total: 205
- Time zone: UTC+3:30 (IRST)

Gandoman (Persian: گندمان) (Note: Also romanized as Gandomān) is a village in Posht-e Arbaba Rural District of Armardeh District (Note: Formerly Alut District) in Baneh County, Kurdistan province, Iran.

== Demographics ==
=== Ethnicity ===
The village is populated by Kurds.

=== Population ===
At the time of the 2006 National Census, the village's population was 353 in 64 households. The following census in 2011 counted 263 people in 56 households. The 2016 census measured the population of the village as 205 people in 56 households.
