= Kucher =

Kucher may refer to:

- Kucher (surname)
- Kucher, Iran, a village in Kurdistan Province, Iran
- Kucher Model K1, Hungarian machine gun

== See also ==
- Simon-Kucher, consulting company
