= Sarbard =

Village in Kurdistan province, Iran

Sarbard Persian: سربرد
- Village
- Location within Iran Location within Iran Kurdistan
- Coordinates: 35°54′51″N 45°42′40″E
- Country: Iran
- Province: Kurdistan
- County: Baneh
- District: Armardeh
- Rural District: Beleh Keh

Population (2016)
  - Total: 98
- Time zone: UTC+3:30 (IRST)

Sarbard (Persian: سربرد) is a village in Beleh Keh Rural District of Armardeh District (Note: Formerly Alut District) in Baneh County, Kurdistan province, Iran.

== Demographics ==
=== Ethnicity ===
The village is populated by Kurds.

=== Population ===
At the time of the 2006 National Census, the village's population was 91 in 19 households. The following census in 2011 counted 86 people in 23 households. The 2016 census measured the population of the village as 98 people in 29 households.
