= Nirvan =

Village in Kurdistan province, Iran

Nirvan Persian: نيروان
- Village
- Location within Iran Location within Iran Kurdistan
- Coordinates: 35°55′33″N 45°42′17″E
- Country: Iran
- Province: Kurdistan
- County: Baneh
- District: Armardeh
- Rural District: Posht-e Arbaba

Population (2016)
  - Total: 212
- Time zone: UTC+3:30 (IRST)

Nirvan (Persian: نيروان) (Note: Also romanized as Nīravān and Nīrvān) is a village in Posht-e Arbaba Rural District of Armardeh District (Note: Formerly Alut District) in Baneh County, Kurdistan province, Iran.

== Demographics ==
=== Ethnicity ===
The village is populated by Kurds.

=== Population ===
At the time of the 2006 National Census, the village's population was 322 in 59 households. The following census in 2011 counted 259 people in 62 households. The 2016 census measured the population of the village as 212 people in 60 households.
