= Surav =

Village in Kurdistan province, Iran

Surav Persian: سوراو
- Village
- Location within Iran Location within Iran Kurdistan
- Coordinates: 35°49′53″N 45°51′13″E
- Country: Iran
- Province: Kurdistan
- County: Baneh
- District: Armardeh
- Rural District: Beleh Keh

Population (2016)
  - Total: 243
- Time zone: UTC+3:30 (IRST)

Surav (Persian: سوراو) (Note: Also romanized as Sūrāv; also known as Sūr Āb) is a village in Beleh Keh Rural District of Armardeh District (Note: Formerly Alut District) in Baneh County, Kurdistan province, Iran.

== Demographics ==
=== Ethnicity ===
The village is populated by Kurds.

=== Population ===
At the time of the 2006 National Census, the village's population was 350 in 57 households. The following census in 2011 counted 324 people in 68 households. The 2016 census measured the population of the village as 243 people in 61 households.
