= Satiar =

Village in Kurdistan province, Iran

Satiar Persian: ساطيار
- Village
- Location within Iran Location within Iran Kurdistan
- Coordinates: 35°54′47″N 45°46′03″E
- Country: Iran
- Province: Kurdistan
- County: Baneh
- District: Armardeh
- Rural District: Posht-e Arbaba

Population (2016)
  - Total: Below reporting threshold
- Time zone: UTC+3:30 (IRST)

Satiar (Persian: ساطيار) (Note: Also romanized as Sāţīār; also known as Sīāţīār) is a village in Posht-e Arbaba Rural District of Armardeh District (Note: Formerly Alut District) in Baneh County, Kurdistan province, Iran.

== Demographics ==
=== Ethnicity ===
The village is populated by Kurds.

=== Population ===
At the time of the 2006 National Census, the village's population was 90 in 18 households. The following census in 2011 counted 59 people in 12 households. The 2016 census measured the population of the village as below the reporting threshold.
