= Kani Chulkeh =

Village in Kurdistan province, Iran

Kani Chulkeh Persian: كاني چولكه
- Village
- Location within Iran Location within Iran Kurdistan
- Coordinates: 35°53′31″N 45°48′38″E
- Country: Iran
- Province: Kurdistan
- County: Baneh
- District: Armardeh
- Rural District: Posht-e Arbaba

Population (2016)
  - Total: 50
- Time zone: UTC+3:30 (IRST)

Kani Chulkeh (Persian: كاني چولكه) (Note: Also romanized as Kānī Chūlakeh and Kānī Chūlkeh)) is a village in Posht-e Arbaba Rural District of Armardeh District (Note: Formerly Alut District) in Baneh County, Kurdistan province, Iran.

== Demographics ==
=== Ethnicity ===
The village is populated by Kurds.

=== Population ===
At the time of the 2006 National Census, the village's population was 54 in nine households. The following census in 2011 counted 39 people in eight households. The 2016 census measured the population of the village as 50 people in 16 households.
