= Mir Yusof =

Mir Yusof (Persian: ميريوسف) may refer to:

- Mir Yusof-e Olya
- Mir Yusof-e Sofla
