= Mir Yusof-e Sofla =

Village in Kurdistan province, Iran

Mir Yusof-e Sofla Persian: ميريوسف سفلي
- Village
- Location within Iran Location within Iran Kurdistan
- Coordinates: 35°55′51″N 45°45′09″E
- Country: Iran
- Province: Kurdistan
- County: Baneh
- District: Armardeh
- Rural District: Posht-e Arbaba

Population (2016)
  - Total: 32
- Time zone: UTC+3:30 (IRST)

Mir Yusof-e Sofla (Persian: ميريوسف سفلي) (Note: Also romanized as Mīr Yūsof-e Soflá; also known as Mīr Yūsof) is a village in Posht-e Arbaba Rural District of Armardeh District (Note: Formerly Alut District) in Baneh County, Kurdistan province, Iran.

== Demographics ==
=== Ethnicity ===
The village is populated by Kurds.

=== Population ===
At the time of the 2006 National Census, the village's population was 39 in eight households. The following census in 2011 counted 30 people in six households. The 2016 census measured the population of the village as 32 people in nine households.
