= Banavan, Kurdistan =

Village in Kurdistan province, Iran

Banavan Persian: بانوان
- Village
- Location within Iran Location within Iran Kurdistan
- Coordinates: 35°51′43″N 45°45′51″E
- Country: Iran
- Province: Kurdistan
- County: Baneh
- District: Armardeh
- Rural District: Beleh Keh

Population (2016)
  - Total: 140
- Time zone: UTC+3:30 (IRST)

Banavan (Persian: بانوان) (Note: Also romanized as Bānavān) is a village in Beleh Keh Rural District of Armardeh District (Note: Formerly Alut District) in Baneh County, Kurdistan province, Iran.

== Demographics ==
=== Ethnicity ===
The village is populated by Kurds.

=== Population ===
At the time of the 2006 National Census, the village's population was 169 in 33 households. The following census in 2011 counted 160 people in 33 households. The 2016 census measured the population of the village as 140 people in 37 households.
