= Kukh Sheykh ol Eslam =

Village in Kurdistan province, Iran

Kukh Sheykh ol Eslam Persian: كوخ شيخ الاسلام
- Village
- Location within Iran Location within Iran Kurdistan
- Coordinates: 35°58′40″N 45°51′13″E
- Country: Iran
- Province: Kurdistan
- County: Baneh
- District: Armardeh
- Rural District: Posht-e Arbaba

Population (2016)
  - Total: 370
- Time zone: UTC+3:30 (IRST)

Kukh Sheykh ol Eslam (Persian: كوخ شيخ الاسلام) (Note: Also romanized as Kūkh Sheykh ol Eslām; also known as Sheykh ol Eslām) is a village in Posht-e Arbaba Rural District of Armardeh District (Note: Formerly Alut District) in Baneh County, Kurdistan province, Iran.

== Demographics ==
=== Ethnicity ===
The village is populated by Kurds.

=== Population ===
At the time of the 2006 National Census, the village's population was 167 in 37 households. The following census in 2011 counted 226 people in 51 households. The 2016 census measured the population of the village as 370 people in 98 households.
