= Surehban, Kurdistan =

Village in Kurdistan province, Iran

Surehban Persian: سوره بان
- Village
- Location within Iran Location within Iran Kurdistan
- Coordinates: 35°55′31″N 45°43′09″E
- Country: Iran
- Province: Kurdistan
- County: Baneh
- District: Armardeh
- Rural District: Posht-e Arbaba

Population (2016)
  - Total: 45
- Time zone: UTC+3:30 (IRST)

Surehban (Persian: سوره بان) (Note: Also romanized as Sūrehbān and Sūrrehbān) is a village in Posht-e Arbaba Rural District of Armardeh District (Note: Formerly Alut District) in Baneh County, Kurdistan province, Iran.

== Demographics ==
=== Ethnicity ===
The village is populated by Kurds.

=== Population ===
At the time of the 2006 National Census, the village's population was 43 in eight households. The following census in 2011 counted 38 people in seven households. The 2016 census measured the population of the village as 45 people in 15 households.
