= Saluk-e Olya =

Village in Kurdistan province, Iran

Saluk-e Olya Persian: سالوك عليا
- Village
- Location within Iran Location within Iran Kurdistan
- Coordinates: 35°59′04″N 45°45′46″E
- Country: Iran
- Province: Kurdistan
- County: Baneh
- District: Armardeh
- Rural District: Posht-e Arbaba

Population (2016)
  - Total: 167
- Time zone: UTC+3:30 (IRST)

Saluk-e Olya (Persian: سالوك عليا) (Note: Also romanized as Sālūk-e ‘Olyā; also known as Salug and Sālūk-e Bālā) is a village in Posht-e Arbaba Rural District of Armardeh District (Note: Formerly Alut District) in Baneh County, Kurdistan province, Iran.

== Demographics ==
=== Ethnicity ===
The village is populated by Kurds.

=== Population ===
At the time of the 2006 National Census, the village's population was 247 in 42 households. The following census in 2011 counted 201 people in 40 households. The 2016 census measured the population of the village as 167 people in 44 households.
