= Barvish Kani, Armardeh =

Village in Kurdistan province, Iran

Barvish Kani Persian: برويشكاني
- Village
- Location within Iran Location within Iran Kurdistan
- Coordinates: 35°53′47″N 45°51′33″E
- Country: Iran
- Province: Kurdistan
- County: Baneh
- District: Armardeh
- Rural District: Posht-e Arbaba

Population (2016)
  - Total: 27
- Time zone: UTC+3:30 (IRST)

Barvish Kani (Persian: برويشكاني) (Note: Also romanized as Barvīsh Kānī; also known as Berveshkānī and Byrvesh-kani) is a village in Posht-e Arbaba Rural District of Armardeh District (Note: Formerly Alut District) in Baneh County, Kurdistan province, Iran.

== Demographics ==
=== Ethnicity ===
The village is populated by Kurds.

=== Population ===
At the time of the 2006 National Census, the village's population was 70 in 12 households. The following census in 2011 counted 28 people in five households. The 2016 census measured the population of the village as 27 people in seven households.
