= Kukh-e Mamu =

Village in Kurdistan province, Iran

Kukh-e Mamu Persian: كوخ مامو
- Village
- Location within Iran Location within Iran Kurdistan
- Coordinates: 35°54′28″N 45°52′09″E
- Country: Iran
- Province: Kurdistan
- County: Baneh
- District: Armardeh
- Rural District: Posht-e Arbaba

Population (2016)
  - Total: 280
- Time zone: UTC+3:30 (IRST)

Kukh-e Mamu (Persian: كوخ مامو) (Note: Also romanized as Kūkh-e Māmū) is a village in Posht-e Arbaba Rural District of Armardeh District (Note: Formerly Alut District) in Baneh County, Kurdistan province, Iran.

== Demographics ==
=== Ethnicity ===
The village is populated by Kurds.

=== Population ===
At the time of the 2006 National Census, the village's population was 357 in 64 households. The following census in 2011 counted 300 people in 62 households. The 2016 census measured the population of the village as 280 people in 73 households.
