= Kukh-e Sufi Rashi Piruz =

Village in Kurdistan province, Iran

Kukh-e Sufi Rashi Piruz Persian: كوخ صوفي رشيدپيروز
- Village
- Location within Iran Location within Iran Kurdistan
- Coordinates: 35°58′36″N 45°50′41″E
- Country: Iran
- Province: Kurdistan
- County: Baneh
- District: Armardeh
- Rural District: Posht-e Arbaba

Population (2016)
  - Total: 83
- Time zone: UTC+3:30 (IRST)

Kukh-e Sufi Rashi Piruz (Persian: كوخ صوفي رشيدپيروز) (Note: Also romanized as Kūkh-e Şūfī Rashīd Pīrūz) is a village in Posht-e Arbaba Rural District of Armardeh District (Note: Formerly Alut District) in Baneh County, Kurdistan province, Iran.

== Demographics ==
=== Ethnicity ===
The village is populated by Kurds.

=== Population ===
At the time of the 2006 National Census, the village's population was 85 in 14 households. The following census in 2011 counted 80 people in 14 households. The 2016 census measured the population of the village as 83 people in 19 households.
