= Kani Band, Baneh =

Village in Kurdistan province, Iran

Kani Band Persian: كاني بند
- Village
- Location within Iran Location within Iran Kurdistan
- Coordinates: 35°56′37″N 45°53′43″E
- Country: Iran
- Province: Kurdistan
- County: Baneh
- District: Armardeh
- Rural District: Posht-e Arbaba

Population (2016)
  - Total: 256
- Time zone: UTC+3:30 (IRST)

Kani Band (Persian: كاني بند) (Note: Also romanized as Kānī Band) is a village in Posht-e Arbaba Rural District of Armardeh District (Note: Formerly Alut District) in Baneh County, Kurdistan province, Iran.

== Demographics ==
=== Ethnicity ===
The village is populated by Kurds.

=== Population ===
At the time of the 2006 National Census, the village's population was 357 in 68 households. The following census in 2011 counted 267 people in 58 households. The 2016 census measured the population of the village as 256 people in 76 households.
