= Kani Sib, Armardeh =

Village in Kurdistan province, Iran

Kani Sib Persian: كاني سيب
- Village
- Country: Iran
- Province: Kurdistan
- County: Baneh
- District: Armardeh
- Rural District: Posht-e Arbaba

Population (2016)
  - Total: 42
- Time zone: UTC+3:30 (IRST)

Kani Sib (Persian: كاني سيب) (Note: Also romanized as Kānī Sīb) is a village in Posht-e Arbaba Rural District of Armardeh District (Note: Formerly Alut District) in Baneh County, Kurdistan province, Iran.

== Demographics ==
=== Ethnicity ===
The village is populated by Kurds.

=== Population ===
At the time of the 2006 National Census, the village's population was 160 in 26 households. The following census in 2011 counted a population below the reporting threshold. The 2016 census measured the population of the village as 42 people in nine households.
