= Banavan =

Banavan (Persian: بانوان or بنوان) may refer to:

- Banavan, Fars, Iran
- Banavan, Kurdistan, Iran
