= Kucher, Iran =

Village in Kurdistan province, Iran

Kucher Persian: كوچر
- Village
- Location within Iran Location within Iran Kurdistan
- Coordinates: 35°56′18″N 45°50′07″E
- Country: Iran
- Province: Kurdistan
- County: Baneh
- District: Armardeh
- Rural District: Posht-e Arbaba

Population (2016)
  - Total: 148
- Time zone: UTC+3:30 (IRST)

Kucher (Persian: كوچر) (Note: Also romanized as Kūcher) is a village in Posht-e Arbaba Rural District of Armardeh District (Note: Formerly Alut District) in Baneh County, Kurdistan province, Iran.

== Demographics ==
=== Ethnicity ===
The village is populated by Kurds.

=== Population ===
At the time of the 2006 National Census, the village's population was 177 in 37 households. The following census in 2011 counted 163 people in 37 households. The 2016 census measured the population of the village as 148 people in 41 households.
