= Kandeh Sureh, Baneh =

Village in Kurdistan province, Iran

Kandeh Sureh Persian: كنده سوره
- Village
- Location within Iran Location within Iran Kurdistan
- Coordinates: 35°50′29″N 45°48′09″E
- Country: Iran
- Province: Kurdistan
- County: Baneh
- District: Armardeh
- Rural District: Beleh Keh

Population (2016)
  - Total: 736
- Time zone: UTC+3:30 (IRST)

Kandeh Sureh (Persian: كنده سوره) (Note: Also romanized as Kandeh Sūreh) is a village in Beleh Keh Rural District of Armardeh District (Note: Formerly Alut District) in Baneh County, Kurdistan province, Iran.

== Demographics ==
=== Ethnicity ===
The village is populated by Kurds.

=== Population ===
At the time of the 2006 National Census, the village's population was 645 in 123 households. The following census in 2011 counted 708 people in 155 households. The 2016 census measured the population of the village as 736 people in 195 households, the most populous in its rural district.
