= Kukh-e Kani Guyz =

Village in Kurdistan province, Iran

Kukh-e Kani Guyz Persian: كوخ كاني گويز
- Village
- Location within Iran Location within Iran Kurdistan
- Coordinates: 35°57′24″N 45°51′48″E
- Country: Iran
- Province: Kurdistan
- County: Baneh
- District: Armardeh
- Rural District: Posht-e Arbaba

Population (2016)
  - Total: 108
- Time zone: UTC+3:30 (IRST)

Kukh-e Kani Guyz (Persian: كوخ كاني گويز) (Note: Also romanized as Kūkh-e Kānī Gūyz) is a village in Posht-e Arbaba Rural District of Armardeh District (Note: Formerly Alut District) in Baneh County, Kurdistan province, Iran.

== Demographics ==
=== Ethnicity ===
The village is populated by Kurds.

=== Population ===
At the time of the 2006 National Census, the village's population was 113 in 18 households. The following census in 2011 counted 103 people in 20 households. The 2016 census measured the population of the village as 108 people in 22 households.
