= Saluk-e Sofla =

Village in Kurdistan province, Iran

Saluk-e Sofla Persian: سالوك سفلي
- Village
- Location within Iran Location within Iran Kurdistan
- Coordinates: 35°59′03″N 45°44′04″E
- Country: Iran
- Province: Kurdistan
- County: Baneh
- District: Armardeh
- Rural District: Posht-e Arbaba

Population (2016)
  - Total: 99
- Time zone: UTC+3:30 (IRST)

Saluk-e Sofla (Persian: سالوك سفلي) (Note: Also romanized as Sālūk-e Soflá; also known as Sālūg-e Pā’īn and Sālūk-e Pā’īn) is a village in Posht-e Arbaba Rural District of Armardeh District (Note: Formerly Alut District) in Baneh County, Kurdistan province, Iran.

== Demographics ==
=== Ethnicity ===
The village is populated by Kurds.

=== Population ===
At the time of the 2006 National Census, the village's population was 39 in seven households. The following census in 2011 counted 42 people in nine households. The 2016 census measured the population of the village as 99 people in 30 households.
