= Barvish Kani =

Barvish Kani (Persian: برويشكاني), also rendered as Berveshkani, may refer to:

- Barvish Kani, Alut
- Barvish Kani, Nanur
