= Kani Seyf, Armardeh =

Village in Kurdistan province, Iran

Kani Seyf Persian: كاني سيف
- Village
- Location within Iran Location within Iran Kurdistan
- Coordinates: 35°53′35″N 45°54′55″E
- Country: Iran
- Province: Kurdistan
- County: Baneh
- District: Armardeh
- Rural District: Beleh Keh

Population (2016)
  - Total: 43
- Time zone: UTC+3:30 (IRST)

Kani Seyf (Persian: كاني سيف) (Note: Also romanized as Kānī Seyf) is a village in Beleh Keh Rural District of Armardeh District (Note: Formerly Alut District) in Baneh County, Kurdistan province, Iran.

== Demographics ==
=== Ethnicity ===
The village is populated by Kurds.

=== Population ===
At the time of the 2006 National Census, the village's population was 55 in 11 households. The following census in 2011 counted 49 people in nine households. The 2016 census measured the population of the village as 43 people in 12 households.
