= Epol Falls =

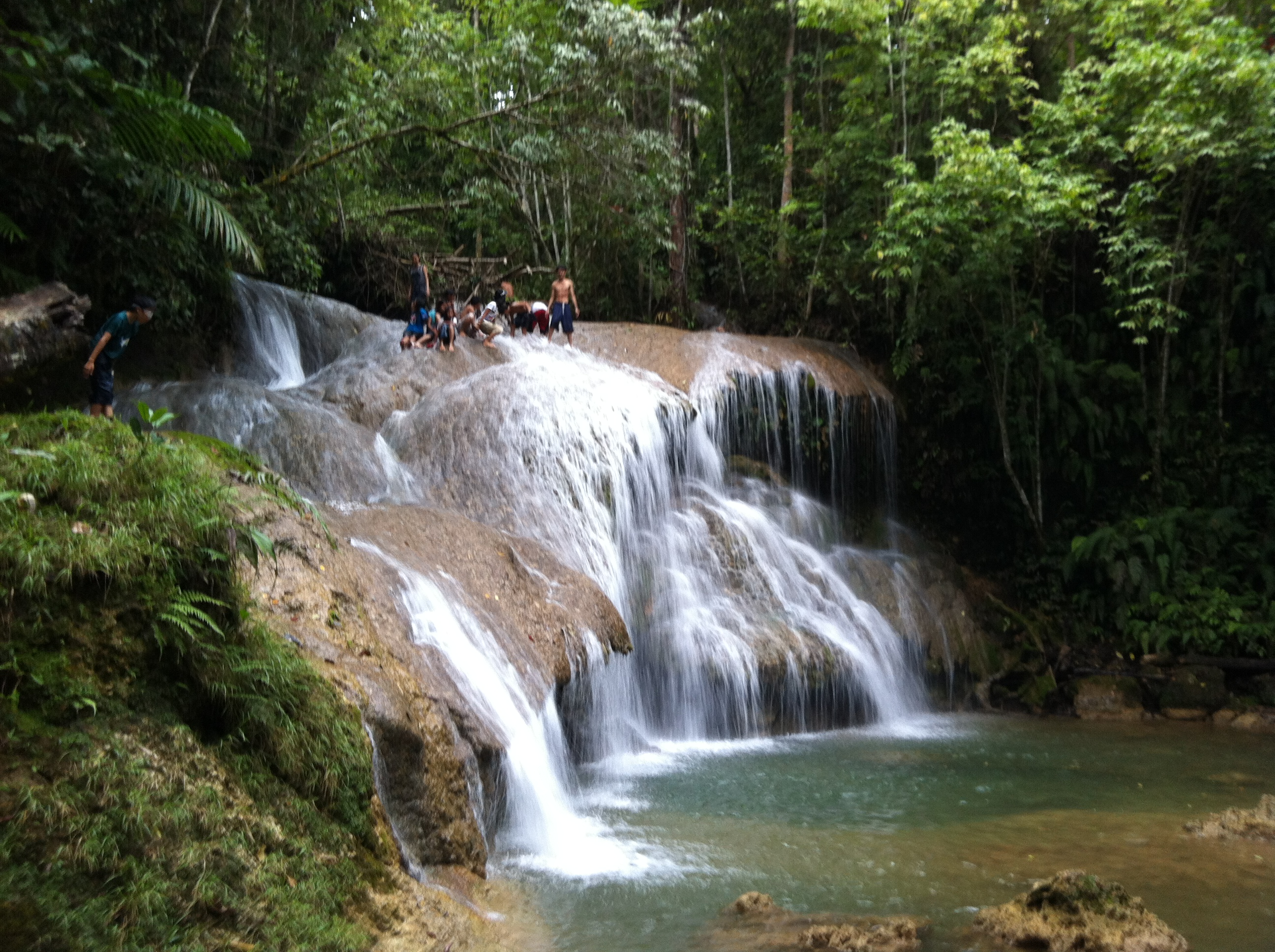
- Interactive map of Epol Falls
- Location: Baganihan, Marilog, Davao City
- Coordinates: 7°27′13″N 125°14′15″E

Epol Falls is a waterfall in Davao City, Philippines.

== Description ==
Epol is an acronym which stands for Everlasting Power of Love Waterfalls. It was formerly known as the Green Valley waterfalls. It is one of the natural tourist attractions of the mountainous area of Marilog District Davao City which is approximately three hundred (300) meters away from the highway. The falls are cascades of cold water that plunge into a natural pool. It is surrounded by tropical plants and trees that provide a habitat for wildlife.

The Epol falls have bamboo huts that provide shade and a place to prepare food.

== Location ==
Epol Falls is located at the district of Marilog in the mountainous area of barangay Baganihan, the homeland of the Matigsalug tribe and is adjacent to Bukidnon and Cotabato provinces. It is high altitude with some parts reaching 4,000 feet above sea level, cool and pleasant weather where many go for treks, vegetables and just to escape the humid and punishing heat in the lowlands.

== Access to the falls ==
The falls are approximately 80km (50 miles) from downtown Davao City, and almost three hours travel by bus.

== Legend ==
According to the Matigsalug tribe ancestor, a long time ago the falls has been the witness of the forbidden relationship of a lover. It was a rendezvous for their secret affair. One day the father of the girl found out about their relationship and took her away to a faraway place. From then on, nobody knows what happened to the girl. Every day the man visited the falls, hopelessly hoping that the girl will come back.

One day when he was very old, he noticed an old woman sitting beside the falls. It was his long-lost girlfriend. They both cried and hug each other and hold on to the Everlasting power of love.

From ancestor to ancestor, this legend had been passed down. One day, a tourist visited the place which was formerly called “Green Valley” – a name after the green background of the falls. After he heard the love story from one of the native guides he exclaimed: "Oh! this place is not a green valley, it is a place of Everlasting power of love. From then on, they called the place Epol.

== The trail ==
To reach the Epol waterfalls, there is a hike of 30 minutes on a forest trail. The trail going down to the falls is interesting due to the huge forest trees, rare plants, wildflowers, and colourful butterflies and insects. The trail is usually slippery due to the cold weather condition of the place and it is recommended to wear hiking shoes.

== Management ==
Epol waterfall is maintained and managed by Marilog locals who collect an entrance fee. Marilog locals belong to the Matigsalug tribe.
