= Salug (disambiguation) =

Salug is a municipality in the province of Zamboanga del Norte, Philippines.

Salug may also refer to:

- Salug River, a river in the Philippines
- Salug language, one of the Subanen languages of the Philippines
- Salug, Iran (disambiguation), several villages in Iran

== See also ==
- Salog
- Sulug Island
