= Mir Yusof-e Olya =

Village in Kurdistan province, Iran

Mir Yusof-e Olya Persian: ميريوسف عليا
- Village
- Location within Iran Location within Iran Kurdistan
- Coordinates: 35°55′42″N 45°45′30″E
- Country: Iran
- Province: Kurdistan
- County: Baneh
- District: Armardeh
- Rural District: Posht-e Arbaba

Population (2016)
  - Total: 97
- Time zone: UTC+3:30 (IRST)

Mir Yusof-e Olya (Persian: ميريوسف عليا) (Note: Also romanized as Mīr Yūsof-e ‘Olyā) is a village in Posht-e Arbaba Rural District of Armardeh District (Note: Formerly Alut District) in Baneh County, Kurdistan province, Iran.

== Demographics ==
=== Ethnicity ===
The village is populated by Kurds.

=== Population ===
At the time of the 2006 National Census, the village's population was 129 in 23 households. The following census in 2011 counted 146 people in 27 households. The 2016 census measured the population of the village as 97 people in 25 households.
