= Davao River =

River in Mindanao, Philippines

Davao River: Bankerohan River; Salug River
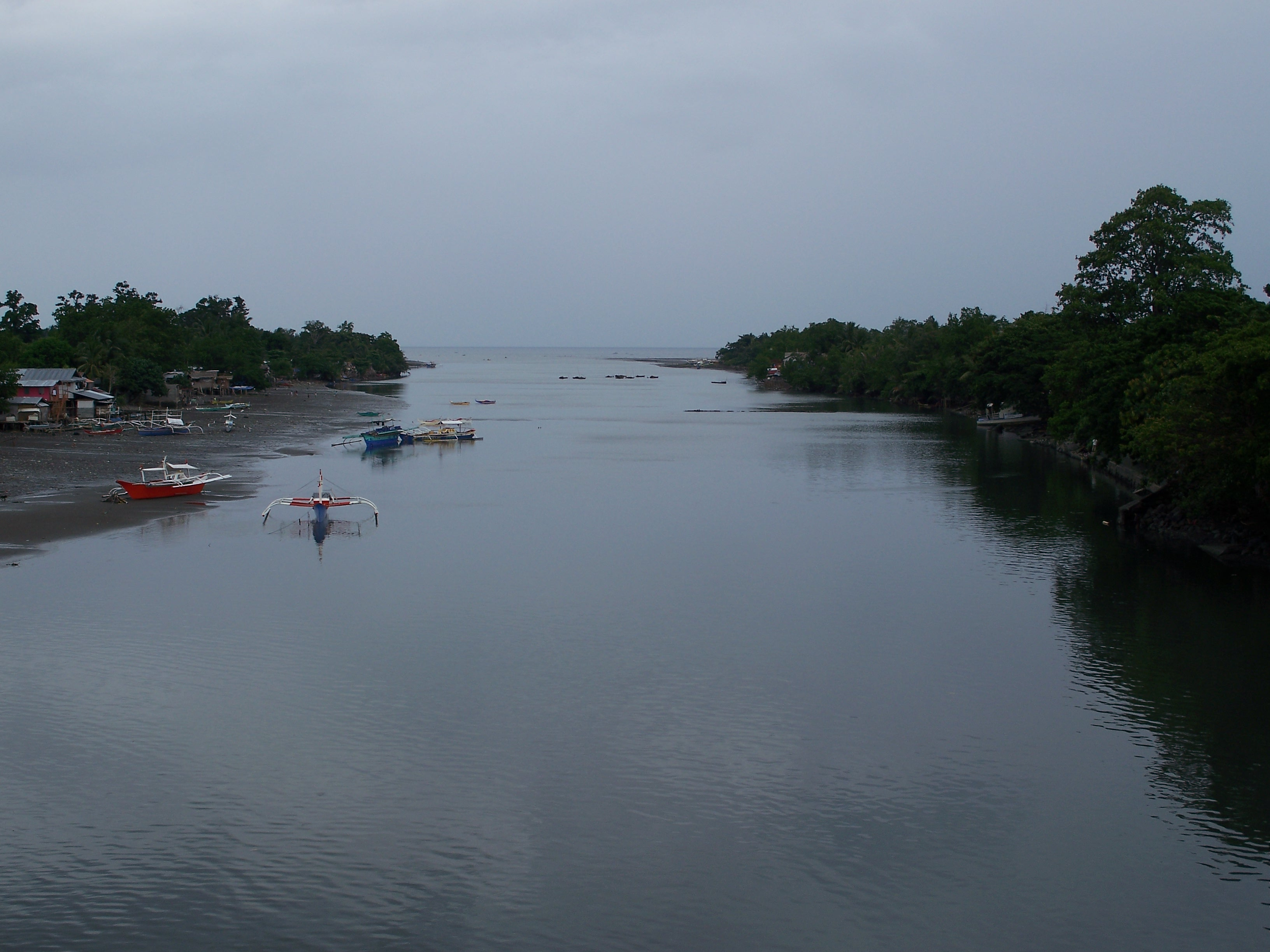
- Mouth of the Davao River

- Location within Mindanao mainland Location within Philippines
- Native name: Davohoho/Davohaha/Duhwow (Manobo languages)

Location
- Country: Philippines
- Region: Northern Mindanao; Davao Region
- Province: Bukidnon

Physical characteristics
- Source: Salug River; Apo–Talomo
  - location: San Fernando, Bukidnon
- Mouth: Davao Gulf
  - location: Davao City
  - coordinates: 7°02′54″N 125°36′25″E
  - elevation: 0 m (0 ft)
- Length: 170 km (110 mi)
- Basin size: 1,623 km^{2} (627 sq mi)
- Discharge
  - location: Davao Gulf
  - average: 80 m^{3}/s (2,800 cu ft/s)

Basin features
- Tributaries
  - left: Panigan River; Tamugan River
  - right: Salug River

The Davao River is the third largest river by drainage basin in the southern Philippines on the island of Mindanao. It drains an area of over 1,700 square kilometres (660 sq mi) with a total length of 170 kilometres (110 mi). Most of the area is uplands. Average flows within the river near the mouth are estimated at 70 to 80 cubic metres per second (2,500 to 2,800 cu ft/s). The climate type is relatively uniform throughout the year with evenly distributed rainfall and temperatures and humidity (rainfall = 2600mm, Actual Evap 1028mm). The area rarely experiences typhoons.

== Stats ==
- River Length: 150 kilometres (93 mi)
- Maximum Elevation: 1,875 metres (6,152 ft)
- Rainfall Average: Mean annual rainfall is 1800mm. Rainfall is evenly distributed throughout the year.

== Topography/Soil Type ==
Plains and Valley: Parent Material:

- San Maguel Silty Clay Loam: Alluvium of igneous
- Matina Clay Loam : Alluvium from limestone, shale and sandstones

Intermediate Upland:

- Tugbok Clay: Igneous rock Andesites
- Faraon Clay: Soft Coralline limestone
- Cabantain Clay: Soft shales with mix of weathered gravels and pebbles

Hills and Mountains:

- Camansa sandy clay loam: Shale and sandstone with weathered gravel and sand
- Mountain Soils: undifferentiated : Various igneous and metamorphic rock

== Demographic properties ==
- DRW Population: ~ 800,000
- Average per capita income: 144,039 per family per annum (2000 national average)
- Industrial and agricultural gross domestic product: 64.1 billion pesos for Region XI
- Population below poverty line: 45% in rural areas; 27% in urban areas (for southern Mindanao)
- Water poverty index parameters: Medium (WPI 56-61.9).

== Land uses ==
The landform and landcover within the basin is highly diverse. Ranging from lowland urban, agricultural, wetland and mangrove to natural riparian, plantations, upland agriculture and mountainous forest including primary forest. The area is classified by DENR as 77.5% forestlands and 22.5% alienable and disposable land. This is not a true land uses (or land cover) classification. Detailed land use is not available. Information is available from several sources including the Comprehensive Land Use Plan of the City, however this data is as yet theoretical and does not represent the realities or suitability of land at the barangay (lowest tier of local government) level. However the City Planning Office is collecting and digitizing data for land use maps.

== Water resources and uses in the basin ==
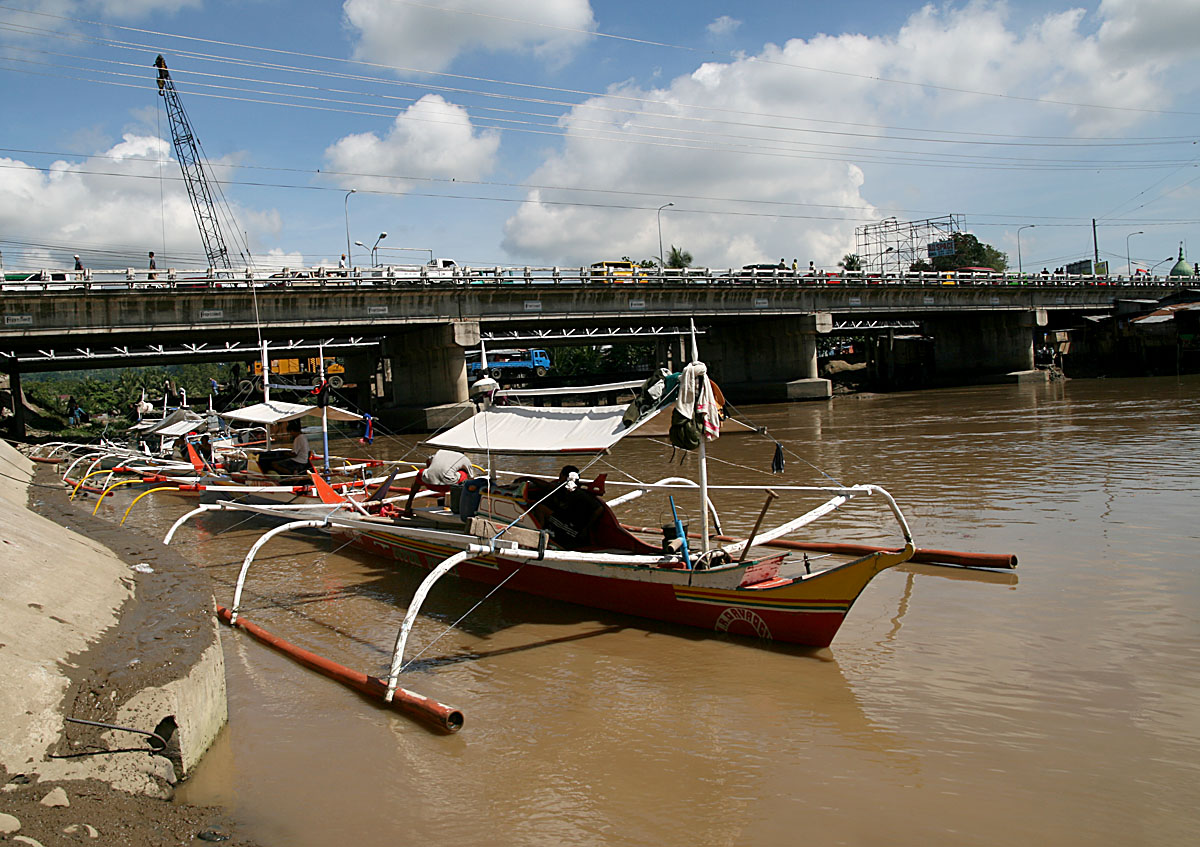
Fishing boats on the Davao River

River discharge measurements taken from 1984 to 1990 indicated an average river flow of approximately 78 cubic meters per second for the period.

The main drinking water sources for Davao City are in the neighboring Talomo watershed. These sources are under pressure and the Davao River Basin is likely to be required for water abstraction in the near future.

The Environmental Management Bureau samples 8 sites from the confluence of the Tamugan river downstream to the mouth of the river. From the Tamugan River confluence with the Davao River down stream to DDF Subdivision, Mandug the water is classified as Class A – Public Water Supply Class II. Downstream of this point to the sea is classified as Class B or recreational water class I. Analyses for dissolved oxygen over the past 4 years has indicated no significant change in quality. The current monitoring of water quality is insufficient to monitor and evaluate pollution levels and trends in the river.

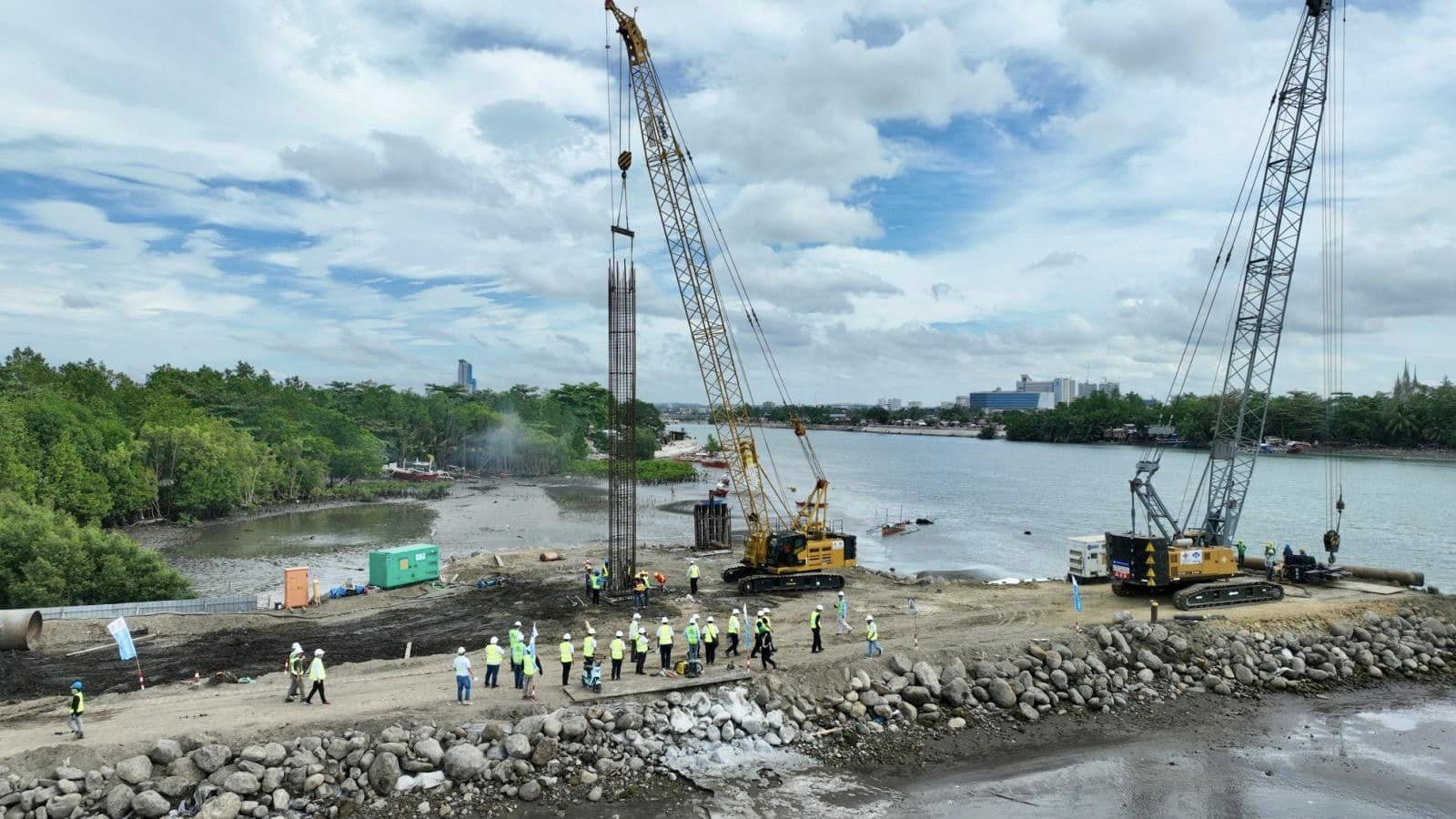
Bucana bridge construction

=== Bucana Bridge Project ===
The construction of the Davao River Bridge is a 1.34-kilometer ₱3.126 billion project, funded by the Government and China Aid Grant. Located in Bucana, it is complementary to the Davao City Coastal Road as it includes the approach roads of the Davao City Coastal Bypass Road as transversal from Roxas Avenue to Bago Aplaya. Under the Build Build Build per contractor China Road and Bridge Corporation, the four-lane, six-span extradosed bridge with a 480.20 meters span across the Davao River started in November 2023 and is 32.13% complete.

Currently, the bridge civil engineering includes rebars installation for pier columns and crossbeams, scaffoldings placement prefatory to deck construction, steel sheet pile driving for cofferdam and deep foundation.
