= San Fernando, Bukidnon =

Municipality in Bukidnon, Philippines

San Fernando
- Municipality
- Municipality of San Fernando
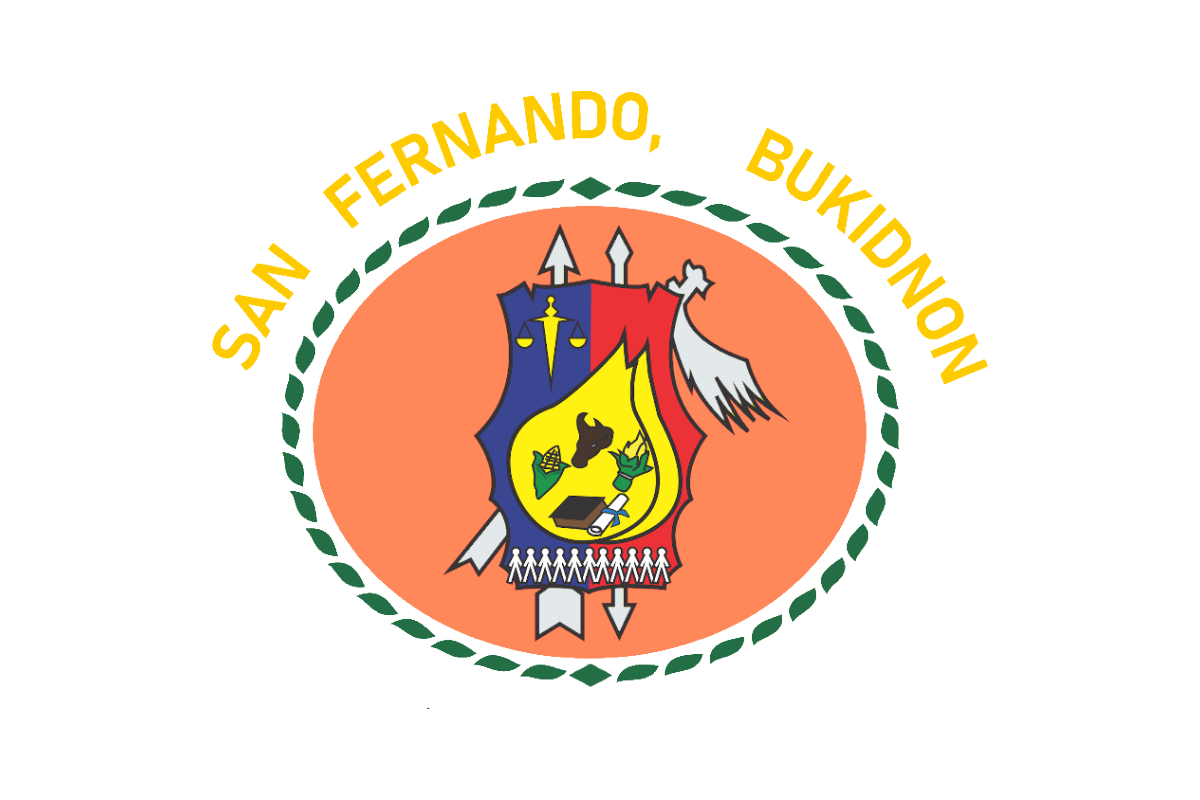
- Flag Seal
- Nickname: Bukidnon's Gateway to Davao
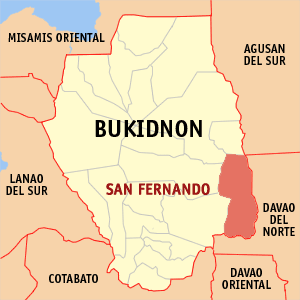
- Map of Bukidnon with San Fernando highlighted
- Interactive map of San Fernando
- Location within the Philippines
- Coordinates: 7°55′04″N 125°19′43″E
- Country: Philippines
- Region: Northern Mindanao
- Province: Bukidnon
- District: 2nd district
- Barangays: 24 (see Barangays)

Government
  - Type: Sangguniang Bayan
  - Mayor: Levi C. Edma Sr.
  - Vice Mayor: Norberto I. Catalan
  - Representative: Jonathan Keith T. Flores
  - Municipal Council: Members: Jeaser Mae M. Yeke; Antonio M. Abayato Jr.; Fernando P. Grafil; Dante C. Dy; Pacita M. Taboclaon; Juan A. Sambalud; Lito L. Calañas; Genaro P. Pacquiao
  - Electorate: 40,231 voters (2025)

Area
  - Total: 705.06 km^{2} (272.23 sq mi)
- Elevation: 509 m (1,670 ft)

Population (2024 census)
  - Total: 65,494
  - Density: 92.891/km^{2} (240.59/sq mi)
  - Households: 14,600

Economy
  - Income class: 1st municipal income class
  - Poverty incidence: 35.56% (2023)
  - Revenue: ₱ 412.6 million (2024)
  - Assets: ₱ 993 million (2024)
  - Expenditure: ₱ 156.9 million (2024)
  - Liabilities: ₱ 121.1 million (2024)

Service provider
  - Electricity: First Bukidnon Electric Cooperative (FIBECO)
- Time zone: UTC+8 (PST)
- ZIP code: 8711
- PSGC: 1001318000
- IDD : area code: +63 (0)88
- Native languages: Binukid; Cebuano; Ata Manobo; Tagalog
- Website: www.sanfernandobuk.gov.ph

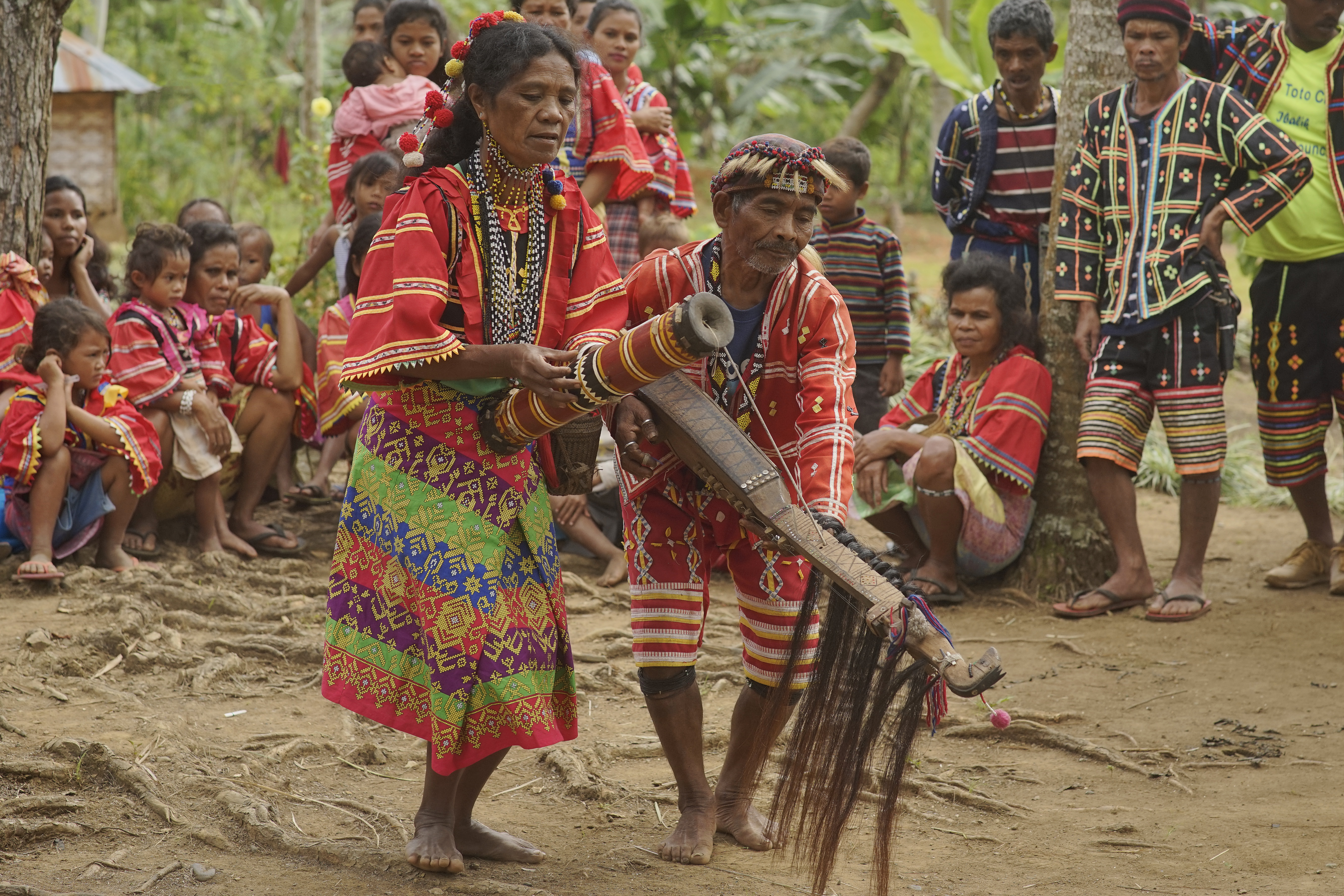
Matigsalug elders

San Fernando, officially the Municipality of San Fernando (Cebuano: Lungsod sa San Fernando; Tagalog: Bayan ng San Fernando), is a municipality in the province of Bukidnon, Philippines. According to the 2024 census, it has a population of 65,494 people.

== History ==
The natives of Bukidnon known as Tigwahanons and Matigsalugs were the original inhabitants of this area. They settled along the fertile river valleys of the Tigwa and Salug rivers. These people were nomadic by nature and subsisted mainly by hunting and eating forest products but they also maintained small plots of corn and root crops in places where they built their temporary shelters. They have a feudal type of government headed by a political chieftain known as "datu", who also acted as their religious leader and armed forces chief.

San Fernando was formerly part of the municipalities of Maramag and Malaybalay. Pursuant to Executive Order No. 347 of President Carlos P. Garcia dated July 29, 1959, the Malaybalay barrios along the Tigua River and the Maramag barrios along the Salug River were separated from their mother towns to create the Municipality of San Fernando. During the reign of Gov. Teodoro Oblad and Cong. Cesar Fortich, a proposal was submitted to the defunct Congress for the creation of this district into municipality. On June 18, 1966, San Fernando was created into a municipality under R.A. 4789 and was named in honor of Fernando Damasco, the father of former Gov. Catalino Damasco. The first set of government was installed at Barangay Namnam, approximately 48 kilometers away from Valencia City.

Creation of San Fernando
Barrios from Malaybalay	Barrios from Maramag
Abihid (only appears in NAMRIA maps, points to present-day Tugop)	Namnam
Tugop (synonymous to San Alfonso as per RA 4789)	Iglugsad
Tagalas-as (part of Little Baguio)	Kibongcog
Little Baguio	Bonacao
Halapitan	Palacpacan
Kalagutay (part of Mabuhay)	Santo Domingo
Sinalanganan (only appears in NAMRIA maps, points to present-day Kawayan)	San Jose
Malambago (part of Magkalungay)	Bulalang

The government resettlement program for Mindanao during the 1960s and 1970s attracted immigrants from Luzon and the Visayas. The arrival of the migrants, attracted by the town's rich agricultural potential, created more settlements in the area and contributed much in the development of the area. The original occupants of the town, the Tigwahanon and the Matigsalug, were then replaced by these lowlanders or "dumagats". Only few natives remained in the lowland and the majority of them settled in the interior and mountainous areas of the municipality.

On July 27, 1970, the municipal council passed a resolution transferring the seat of government from Namnam to Barangay Halapitan. Halapitan - The present town of Halapitan used to be an abaca farm of Victoriano Bantug who served as mayor in the 1970s. Mr. Tamin, a teacher in Namnam used to drop by at Mr. Bantug's house in present Halapitan on his way to Malaybalay, thus the word "Hapit", or drop by. Talangihon which is now Comawas was the loading dock for bamboo rafts as inhabitants sail along Tigoa River connecting Pulangui River onto Lumbayao. Mr. Bantug eventually distributed lands to newcomers and eventually the name Halapitan stayed on " Hapitanan".

== Geography ==
San Fernando is located in the southeast portion of the province of Bukidnon. It is bounded in the north by Malaybalay City and Cabanglasan, in the east by the municipality of Talaingod, Davao del Norte in the south by Davao City and Cotabato province; and in the west by Quezon and Valencia City.

The municipality's Poblacion is 31 kilometres (19 mi) from Valencia City and 71 kilometres (44 mi) from Malaybalay City.

=== Barangays ===
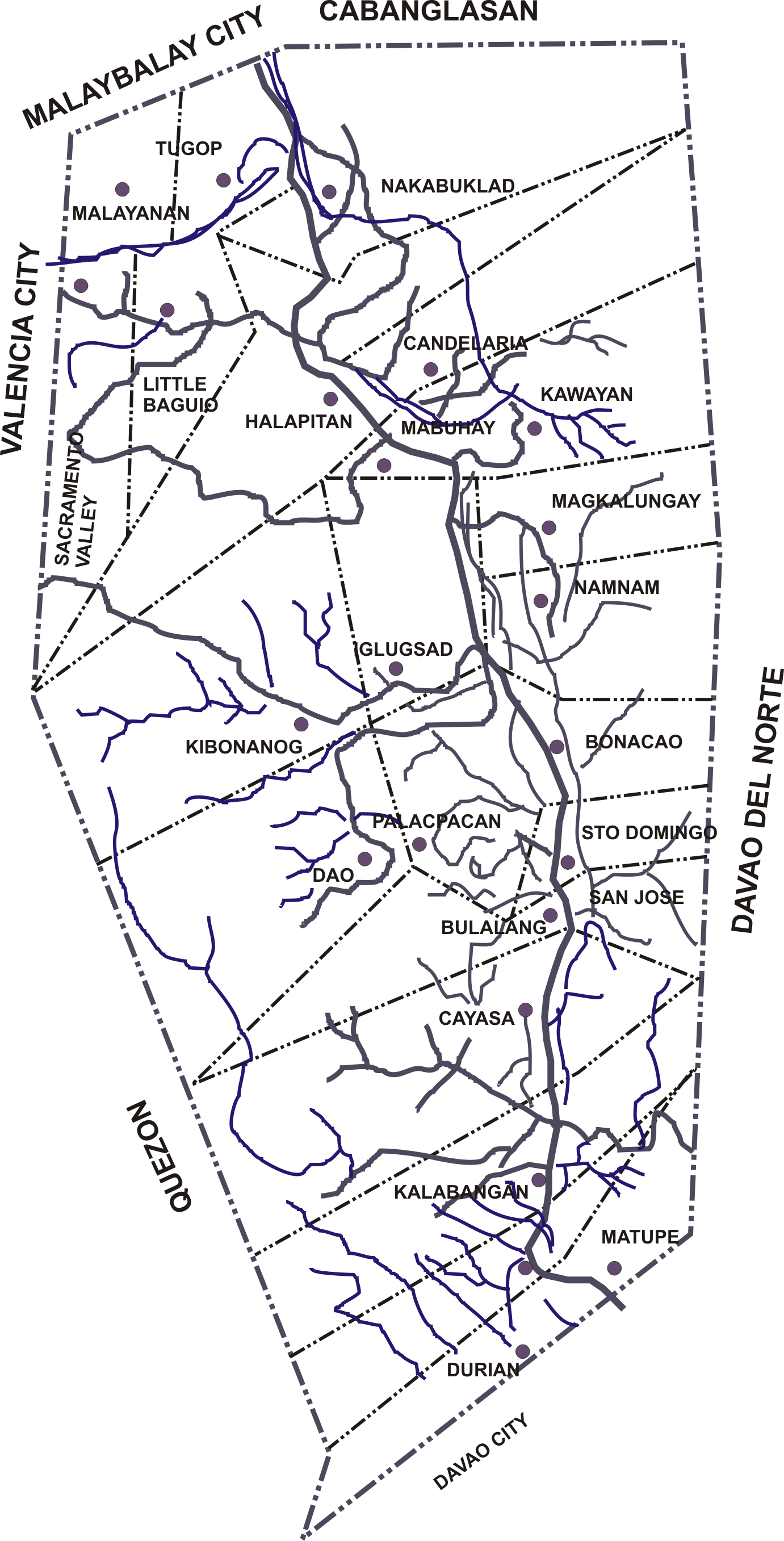
Political map of San Fernando showing its 25 barangays

San Fernando is politically subdivided into 24 barangays. Each barangay consists of puroks while some have sitios.

PSGC	Barangay	Population			±% p.a.	
		2024		2010		
101318001	Bonacao	3.0%	1,989	1,812	▴	0.65%
101318002	Cabuling	1.3%	836	665	▴	1.60%
101318003	Kawayan	2.7%	1,778	1,704	▴	0.30%
101318004	Cayaga	2.0%	1,292	1,246	▴	0.25%
101318005	Dao	3.0%	1,989	1,111	▴	4.13%
101318007	Durian	1.5%	970	939	▴	0.23%
101318009	Iglugsad	2.5%	1,622	1,495	▴	0.57%
101318010	Kalagangan	8.5%	5,569	5,188	▴	0.49%
101318014	Kibongcog	3.0%	1,935	1,654	▴	1.10%
101318016	Little Baguio	7.4%	4,862	4,441	▴	0.63%
101318019	Nacabuklad	1.9%	1,250	1,091	▴	0.95%
101318020	Namnam	5.8%	3,807	3,512	▴	0.56%
101318021	Palacpacan	2.2%	1,412	1,230	▴	0.96%
101318022	Halapitan (Poblacion)	15.6%	10,221	9,280	▴	0.67%
101318023	San Jose	1.5%	973	758	▴	1.75%
101318024	Santo Domingo	2.3%	1,529	1,324	▴	1.00%
101318025	Tugop	2.6%	1,672	1,866	▾	−0.76%
101318026	Matupe	3.2%	2,121	1,643	▴	1.79%
101318027	Bulalang	1.0%	669	529	▴	1.64%
101318028	Candelaria	1.4%	910	815	▴	0.77%
101318029	Mabuhay	4.7%	3,083	2,791	▴	0.69%
101318030	Magkalungay	3.9%	2,533	1,965	▴	1.78%
101318031	Malayanan	1.9%	1,246	1,443	▾	−1.01%
101318032	Sacramento Valley	2.9%	1,870	1,705	▴	0.64%
	Total		65,494	50,207	▴	1.86%

=== Topography ===
About eighty percent of the municipality's area is mountainous. The Pantaron Mountain Range (Central Cordillera of Mindanao) forms part of the natural border between the municipality and the Davao provinces in the west while the Aga Mountains between Valencia City and Quezon.

The Tigwa River valley occupies the northern and central parts of the municipality while the Salug River valley is found in the southern part of the municipality.

=== Bodies of water ===
The municipality has two major river systems: Tigwa River and Salug River. The Tigwa River is a tributary of the Pulangi River, which empties into the Mindanao River in Cotabato City. The Salug River is a tributary of the Davao River that empties into Davao Gulf in the south.

=== Climate ===
Climate data for San Fernando, Bukidnon
Month	Jan	Feb	Mar	Apr	May	Jun	Jul	Aug	Sep	Oct	Nov	Dec	Year
Mean daily maximum °C (°F)	27 (81)	27 (81)	28 (82)	30 (86)	29 (84)	28 (82)	28 (82)	28 (82)	29 (84)	28 (82)	28 (82)	28 (82)	28 (83)
Mean daily minimum °C (°F)	21 (70)	21 (70)	21 (70)	21 (70)	23 (73)	23 (73)	22 (72)	22 (72)	23 (73)	23 (73)	22 (72)	21 (70)	22 (72)
Average precipitation mm (inches)	118 (4.6)	73 (2.9)	66 (2.6)	74 (2.9)	175 (6.9)	261 (10.3)	271 (10.7)	281 (11.1)	267 (10.5)	258 (10.2)	164 (6.5)	93 (3.7)	2,101 (82.9)
Average rainy days	16.0	13.8	12.4	13.1	24.2	27.6	28.9	28.5	27.1	27.4	21.0	16.1	256.1
Source: Meteoblue

== Demographics ==
Population census of San Fernando
Year	Pop.	±% p.a.
1970	6,698	—
1975	17,270	+20.92%
1980	23,083	+5.97%
1990	29,052	+2.33%
1995	34,299	+3.16%
2000	40,165	+3.44%
2007	44,595	+1.45%
2010	50,207	+4.41%
2015	56,138	+2.15%
2020	63,045	+2.47%
2024	65,494	+0.92%
Source: Philippine Statistics Authority

In the 2024 census, the population of San Fernando was 65,494 people, with a density of 93 inhabitants per square kilometre or 240 inhabitants per square mile.

The municipality had a total population of 50,207 people in 2010, up from 40,165 in 2000, with 71 persons per square km.

== Economy ==
Poverty incidence of San Fernando (%)

Source: Philippine Statistics Authority

The municipality is predominantly agricultural with corn as the major product followed by rice and abaca. Rattan, banana, bamboo, vegetables and root crops are also produced in the municipality.

== Government ==
The municipality is administered by the Municipal Mayor together with the Vice Mayor and the Sangguniang Bayan. The mayor is the local chief executive officer of the municipality while the Sangguniang Bayan (or SB) serves as the local legislative arm as mandated by the Local Government Code of the Philippines of 1991.

Under the Mayor's Office are the following offices: Municipal Planning and Development Office, Municipal Civil Registrar's Office, Municipal Engineering Office, Municipal Accounting Office, Municipal Treasurer's Office, Municipal Assessor's Office, Municipal Social Welfare and Development Office, Municipal Agriculture Office and Municipal Budget Office. These offices are mandated to deliver the basic social services to the inhabitants of the municipality.

The Sangguniang Bayan is headed by the Vice Mayor, acting as its presiding officer, and eight (8) regular Sangguniang Bayan members. They formulate laws and ordinances relevant to the municipality.

San Fernando has twenty-four (24) barangays headed by a Punong Barangay together with seven (7) regular Sangguniang Barangay members. 25 Barangays including Langasihan.

== Transportation ==
The municipality has a total road network of 109.82 kilometres (68.24 mi). The municipality can be reached by bus, jeepneys and habal-habal or motorcycles.
