= Beleh Keh Rural District =

Rural district in Kurdistan province, Iran

Beleh Keh Rural District Persian: دهستان بله كه
- Rural District
- Location within Iran Location within Iran Kurdistan
- Coordinates: 35°52′N 45°45′E
- Country: Iran
- Province: Kurdistan
- County: Baneh
- District: Armardeh
- Established: 1993
- Capital: Beleh Keh

Population (2016)
  - Total: 2,448
- Time zone: UTC+3:30 (IRST)

Beleh Keh Rural District (Persian: دهستان بله كه) is in Armardeh District (Note: Formerly Alut District) of Baneh County, Kurdistan province, Iran. Its capital is the village of Beleh Keh.

== Demographics ==
=== Population ===
At the time of the 2006 National Census, the rural district's population was 2,691 in 516 households. There were 2,546 inhabitants in 563 households at the following census of 2011. The 2016 census measured the population of the rural district as 2,448 in 649 households. The most populous of its 11 villages was Kandeh Sureh, with 736 people.

=== Other villages in the rural district ===
- Banavan
- Garmab
- Kani Mamer
- Kani Seyf
- Sarbard
- Sardav
- Sisarak
- Surav
