= Sartazin =

Sartazin سرتزين
- Village
- Location within Iran
- Coordinates: 35°51′12″N 46°01′37″E
- Country: Iran
- Province: Kurdistan
- County: Baneh
- Bakhsh: Nanur
- Rural District: Nanur

Population (2006)
  - Total: 78
- Time zone: UTC+3:30 (IRST)
  - Summer (DST): UTC+4:30 (IRDT)

Sartazin (Persian: سرتزين, also Romanized as Sartazīn; also known as Kūkh Sar Tazīn and Sar Tazan) is a village in Nanur Rural District, Nanur District, Baneh County, Kurdistan Province, Iran. At the 2006 census, its population was 78, in 11 families. The village is populated by Kurds.
