= Kucher (surname) =

Kucher (Russian: Кучер) is a surname of East Slavic origin meaning "coachman". The word itself is of German origin (Kutscher). Notable people with the surname include:

- Alyosha (born Olena Kucher in 1986), Ukrainian singer
- Danylo Kucher, Ukrainian footballer
- Dmytro Kucher, Ukrainian boxer
- Justin Kutcher
- Karol Kennedy Kucher (1932–2004), American skater
- Mykola Kucher
- Oleksandr Kucher (born 1982), Ukrainian footballer
- Oleksiy Kucher
- Philip Kucher
- Yana Kucher, former member of The Kissing Party
