= Kukh-e Hajji Karim =

Kukh-e Hajji Karim كوخ حاجي كريم
- Village
- Location within Iran
- Coordinates: 35°51′42″N 45°54′32″E
- Country: Iran
- Province: Kurdistan
- County: Baneh
- Bakhsh: Nanur
- Rural District: Buin

Population (2006)
  - Total: 30
- Time zone: UTC+3:30 (IRST)
  - Summer (DST): UTC+4:30 (IRDT)

Kukh-e Hajji Karim (Persian: كوخ حاجي كريم, also Romanized as Kūkh-e Ḩājjī Karīm; also kinown as Kūkh-e Ḩājj Karīm) is a village in Buin Rural District, Nanur District, Baneh County, Kurdistan Province, Iran. At the 2006 census, its population was 30, in 5 families. The village is populated by Kurds.
