= Tigwa River =

River in Bukidnon, Philippines

- Tigwa River mouth Tigwa River (Philippines)

Location
- Country: Philippines
- Region: Northern Mindanao
- Province: Bukidnon
- City/municipality: San Fernando

Physical characteristics
- Mouth: Pulangi River
  - coordinates: 7°58′06″N 125°19′33″E

Basin features
- Progression: Tigwa–Pulangi–Mindanao

The Tigwa River is a river in Bukidnon, Philippines. Its drainage area is located in the northern part of the municipality of San Fernando. It is one of the major tributaries of the Pulangi River.

The clearing of surrounding forests has led to floods, the earliest of which occurred in 1982.
