= Posht-e Arbaba Rural District =

Rural district in Kurdistan province, Iran

Posht-e Arbaba Rural District Persian: دهستان پشت آربابا
- Rural District
- Location within Iran Location within Iran Kurdistan
- Coordinates: 35°57′N 45°48′E
- Country: Iran
- Province: Kurdistan
- County: Baneh
- District: Armadeh
- Established: 1987
- Capital: Armardeh

Population (2016)
  - Total: 4,606
- Time zone: UTC+3:30 (IRST)

Posht-e Arbaba Rural District (Persian: دهستان پشت آربابا) is in Armardeh District (Note: Formerly Alut District) of Baneh County, Kurdistan province, Iran. It is administered from the city of Armardeh.

== Demographics ==
=== Population ===
At the time of the 2006 National Census, the rural district's population was 5,641 in 1,032 households. There were 4,706 inhabitants in 1,001 households at the following census of 2011. The 2016 census measured the population of the rural district as 4,606 in 1,239 households. The most populous of its 45 villages was Kani Guyz, with 376 people.

=== Other villages in the rural district ===
- Atabak
- Baraver
- Barvish Kani
- Bayazidabad
- Cherush
- Deymeh
- Dowleh Guyer
- Gandoman
- Guil
- Ka Rostam
- Kani Band
- Kani Benav
- Kani Bid
- Kani Chulkeh
- Kani Ebrahim
- Kani Goli
- Kani Sib
- Kucher
- Kukh Sheykh ol Eslam
- Kukh-e Kani Guyz
- Kukh-e Mamu
- Kukh-e Sufi Rashi Piruz
- Masidar
- Mir Hesam
- Mir Yusof-e Olya
- Mir Yusof-e Sofla
- Mucheh
- Neyzeh Rud
- Nirvan
- Nowdeh
- Qarah Bolagh
- Saluk-e Olya
- Saluk-e Sofla
- Satiar
- Surehban
- Tavakkol
- Tazhan
- Tazhban
- Vazheh
- Zarboneh
