= Kani Sib, Namshir =

Kani Sib كاني سيب
- Village
- Country: Iran
- Province: Kurdistan
- County: Baneh
- Bakhsh: Namshir
- Rural District: Bowalhasan

Population (2006)
  - Total: 128
- Time zone: UTC+3:30 (IRST)
  - Summer (DST): UTC+4:30 (IRDT)

Kani Sib (Persian: كاني سيب, also Romanized as Kānī Sīb) is a village in Bowalhasan Rural District, Namshir District, Baneh County, Kurdistan Province, Iran. At the 2006 census, its population was 128, in 21 families. The village is populated by Kurds.
