= Armardeh =

City in Kurdistan province, Iran

Armardeh Persian: آرمرده
- City
- Location within Iran Location within Iran Kurdistan
- Coordinates: 35°55′53″N 45°47′50″E
- Country: Iran
- Province: Kurdistan
- County: Baneh
- District: Armardeh
- Established as a city: 2000

Population (2016)
  - Total: 2,305
- Time zone: UTC+3:30 (IRST)

Armardeh (Persian: آرمرده) (Note: Also romanized as Ārmardeh and Armordah; also known as Armadeh and Armado) is a city in, and the capital of, Armardeh District (Note: Formerly Alut District) of Baneh County, Kurdistan province, Iran. It also serves as the administrative center for Posht-e Arbaba Rural District. The village of Armardeh was converted to a city in 2000.

== Demographics ==
=== Ethnicity ===
The city is populated by Kurds.

=== Population ===
At the time of the 2006 National Census, the city's population was 2,062 in 427 households. The following census in 2011 counted 2,349 people in 580 households. The 2016 census measured the population of the city as 2,305 people in 613 households.
