= Kani Seyf, Nanur =

Kani Seyf كاني سيف
- Village
- Location within Iran
- Coordinates: 36°00′58″N 45°42′53″E
- Country: Iran
- Province: Kurdistan
- County: Baneh
- Bakhsh: Nanur
- Rural District: Buin

Population (2006)
  - Total: 42
- Time zone: UTC+3:30 (IRST)
  - Summer (DST): UTC+4:30 (IRDT)

Kani Seyf (Persian: كاني سيف, also Romanized as Kānī Seyf) is a village in Buin Rural District, Nanur District, Baneh County, Kurdistan Province, Iran. At the 2006 census, its population was 42, in 6 families. The village is populated by Kurds.
