= Kani Band, Saqqez =

Kani Band كاني بند
- Village
- Country: Iran
- Province: Kurdistan
- County: Saqqez
- Bakhsh: Central
- Rural District: Mir Deh

Population (2006)
  - Total: 131
- Time zone: UTC+3:30 (IRST)
  - Summer (DST): UTC+4:30 (IRDT)

Kani Band (Persian: كاني بند, also Romanized as Kānī Band) is a village in Mir Deh Rural District, in the Central District of Saqqez County, Kurdistan Province, Iran. At the 2006 census, its population was 131, in 23 families. The village is populated by Kurds.
