= Kani Siv =

Kani Siv كاني سيو
- Village
- Location within Iran
- Coordinates: 36°07′06″N 45°28′25″E
- Country: Iran
- Province: West Azerbaijan
- County: Sardasht
- Bakhsh: Central
- Rural District: Baryaji

Population (2006)
  - Total: 88
- Time zone: UTC+3:30 (IRST)
  - Summer (DST): UTC+4:30 (IRDT)

Kani Siv (Persian: كاني سيو, also Romanized as Kānī Sīv; also known as Kānī Sīb) is a village in Baryaji Rural District, in the Central District of Sardasht County, West Azerbaijan Province, Iran. At the 2006 census, its population was 88, in 20 families.
