= Salug River =

River in Mindanao, Philippines

- Salug River mouth Salug River (Philippines)

Location
- Country: Philippines
- Region: Northern Mindanao; Davao Region
- Province: Bukidnon
- City/municipality: San Fernando; Talaingod; Davao City

Physical characteristics
- Source: Palacpacan, San Fernando
- Mouth: Davao River
  - coordinates: 7°41′15″N 125°22′49″E
- Discharge
  - location: Davao Gulf

The Salug River is a river in Bukidnon, Philippines. Its drainage area is located in the southern sections of San Fernando. It acts as an aquifer for said municipality. Salug is a tributary of the Davao River, an extensive river system of within the Davao river basin.

The Matigsalug tribe is named after the river. Their oral tradition states that they first settled at the mouth of the Salug River and only moved upstream due to pressure from piracy.
