= Manobo =

Indigenous peoples from Mindanao in the Philippines

Manobo people
Total population
- 644,904 (2020 census)

Regions with significant populations
- Bukidnon, Caraga region, Cotabato, Davao region, Sultan Kudarat

Languages
- Manobo languages, Cebuano, Filipino, English

Religion
- Christianity, Anito, Shamanism

Related ethnic groups
- Bukidnon, Higaonon, other Lumad ethnicities

The Manobò (sometimes also spelled Menobò, Manuvù , Menuvù , or Minuvù) are a group of indigenous peoples who reside in Mindanao in the Philippines, whose core lands cover most of the Mindanao island group, from Sarangani island into the Mindanao mainland in the regions of Agusan, Davao, Bukidnon, Surigao, Misamis, and Cotabato. The Manobo are considered the most diverse among the many indigenous peoples of the Philippines, with the largest number of subgroups within its family of languages. The Philippine Statistics Authority listed 644,904 persons as Manobo in its 2020 Census of Population and Housing.

== Subgroups ==
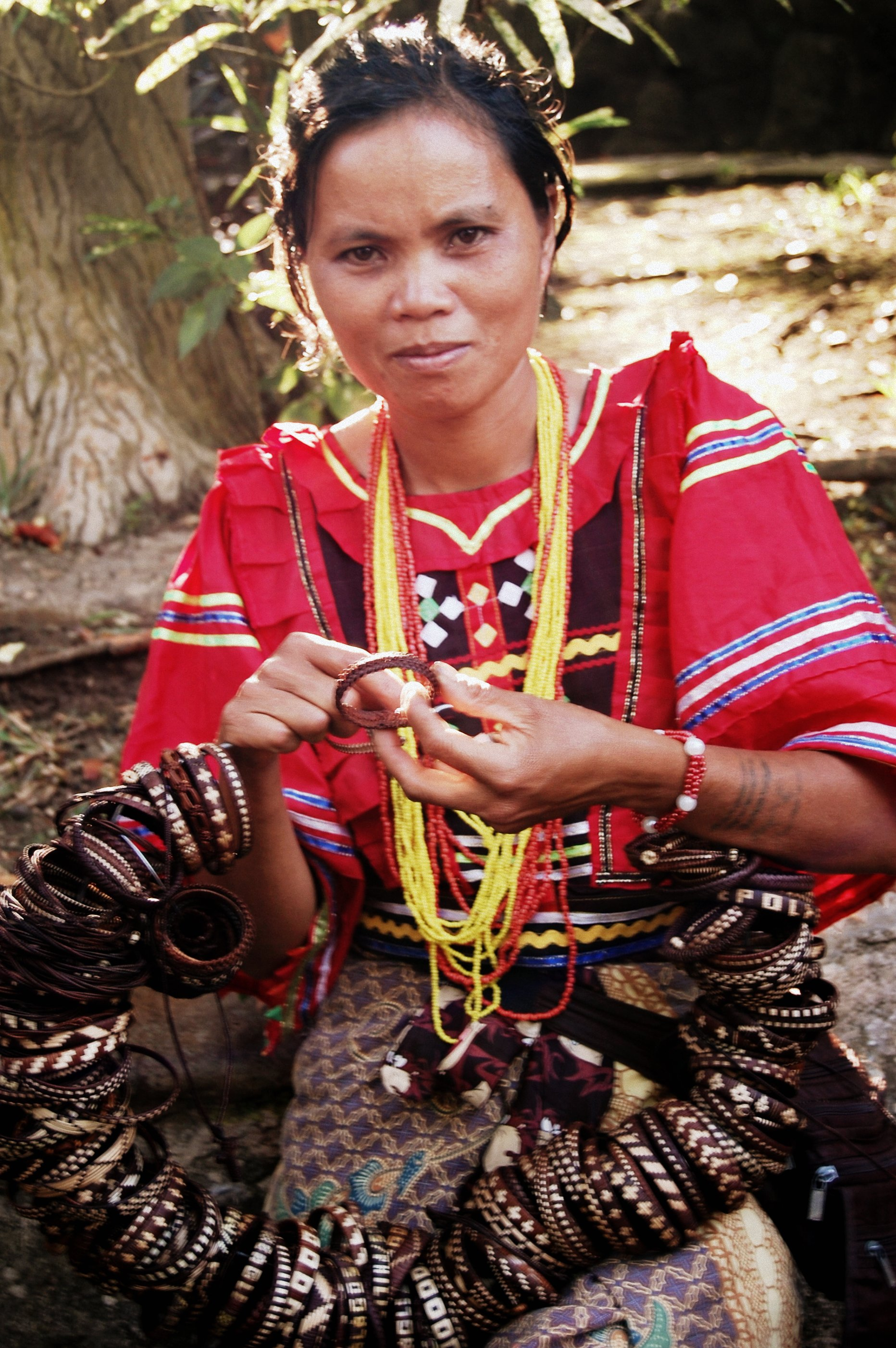
A Bagobo (Manobo) woman of the Matigsalug people from Davao

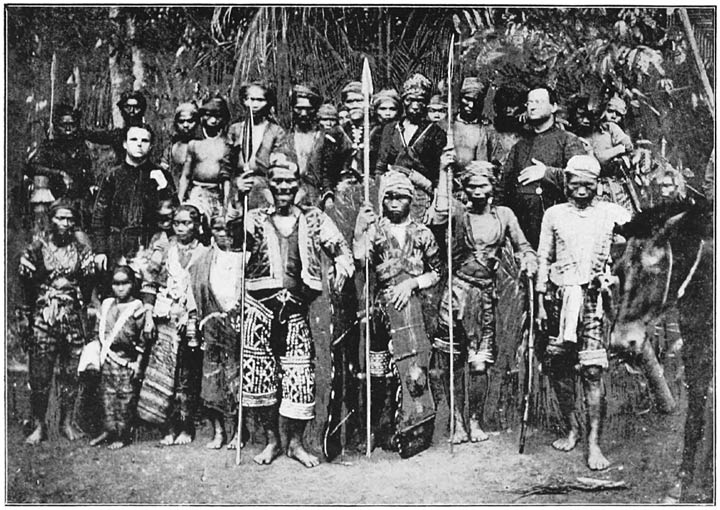
Datu Manib, a bagani of the Bagobo, with family, followers, and two missionaries (c. 1900)

The Manobo are considered the most diverse among the many indigenous peoples of the Philippines, with the largest number of subgroups within its Manobo languages. The National Commission on Culture and the Arts has been able to develop a tentative classification of Manobo subgroups, but notes that "the various subgroupings are not sufficiently defined" as of the time the classification was developed. The classification divides the Manobo into several major groups:

1. The Ata subgroup: Dugbatang, Talaingod, and Tagauanum
2. The Bagobo subgroup: Attaw (Jangan, Klata, Obo, Giangan, Guiangan), Eto (Ata), Kailawan (Kaylawan), Langilan, Manuvu/Obo, Matigsalug (Matigsaug, Matig Salug), Tagaluro, and Tigdapaya
3. The Higaonon subgroup: Agusan, Lanao, and Misamis
4. Cotabato: Ilianen, Livunganen, and Pulenyan
5. South Cotabato: Cotabato (with subgroup Tasaday and Blit), Sarangani, Tagabawa
6. Western Bukidnon: Kiriyeteka, Ilentungen, and Pulangiyen
7. Agusan del Sur
8. Banwaon
9. Bukidnon; and others

The Philippine Statistics Authority listed 644,904 persons as Manobo in its 2020 Census of Population and Housing. A study by the National Council of Churches in the Philippines had put their population at around 250,000 in 1988, and an earlier NCCA estimate had out their population at about 749,042 in 1994.Part of what makes the classification more difficult is that a dialectical subgroup's membership within a supergroup can shift depending on specific points of view regarding linguistics. The geographical distribution of the subgroups is so great that some of the local groups have been noted to "assumed the character of distinctiveness as a separate ethnic grouping," as in the case of the Bagobo or the Higaonon.

== Etymology ==
Manobo is the hispanicized spelling of the endonym Manuvu (also spelled Menuvu or Minuvu). Its etymology is unclear; in its current form, it means "person" or "people." It is believed that it is derived from the root word tuvu, which means "to grow"/"growth" (thus Man[t]uvu would be "[native]-grown" or "aboriginal").

== Genetic studies ==
The Manobo are primarily of Austronesian ancestry, like other Filipino ethnic groups that descend from the Austronesian expansion, but they also have significant Austroasiatic ancestry indicating that part of their ancestors originate via a separate Austroasiatic migration originating from Mainland Southeast Asia. This is similar to the Sama Bajau people. The Manobo possess Denisovan admixture, much like the Mamanwa.

== See also ==
- Lumad
- Indigenous peoples of the Philippines
- Buyog
