= Kandeh Sureh, Saqqez =

Kandeh Sureh كنده سوره
- Village
- Location within Iran
- Coordinates: 36°07′40″N 46°08′12″E
- Country: Iran
- Province: Kurdistan
- County: Saqqez
- Bakhsh: Central
- Rural District: Mir Deh

Population (2006)
  - Total: 279
- Time zone: UTC+3:30 (IRST)
  - Summer (DST): UTC+4:30 (IRDT)

Kandeh Sureh (Persian: كنده سوره, also Romanized as Kandeh Sūreh) is a village in Mir Deh Rural District, in the Central District of Saqqez County, Kurdistan Province, Iran. At the 2006 census, its population was 279, in 53 families. The village is populated by Kurds.
