= Norwegian profanity =

Swear words in Norwegian

Profanity in the Norwegian language is referred to in Norwegian as banneord (curse words) or simply upassende språk (inappropriate language). Many words are characterized by dialect. The offensiveness and strength of a word may be very different between regions.

People from Northern Norway in particular are known for swearing in public. Numerous decisions by Northern district courts have confirmed that saying terms like hestkuk (literally horsecock) to a police officer is not punishable, as it is common usage (one ruling said: "[hestekuk] is not more than one should tolerate in daily conversation."). At the same time, Northerners have been punished for using similar phrases in other parts of the country. However, a 2022 ruling by the West Finnmark district court in Northern Norway, where a man was fined 42 000 kroner after calling a police officer hestkuk, concluded that Northerners swearing was "a stigmatizing and dated idea – and under no circumstance correct", suggesting a reversal of this trend.

== Most common profanities ==
In 2015, the five most common profanities in Norwegian were, in order:

- Forbanna means cursed, and is used as an adjective roughly equivalent to English fucking; forbanna hestkuk approximates fucking horse cock. (The second part, bann, is equivalent to English ban, and is the root of the word banneord.)
- Jævel, meaning devil. In its noun form it carries a meaning similar to bastard. But it is most commonly used in adjective form, jævlig, for emphasis, as in jævlig stor (really big).
- Fuck, sometimes spelled føkk, comes from English. A probable cognate of fuck exists in Old Norwegian: Fukka means to have sex, but this fell out of use before the English term was introduced. Fuck is almost always used as an interjection, and rarely refers to sex.
- Faen is a contraction of the Norwegian word fanden, which means the devil. It is used as an interjection, and usually translated to fuck. Faen ta deg correspons to fuck you or, literally, devil take you.
- Helvete means hell. Dra til helvete means go to hell.

Other common swear words include:

- Forpulte, literally meaning fucked or whore-like, from pule (to fuck).
- Satan, same as in English; used as an interjection or to refer to hell: gå til Satan means go to hell.
- Fitte means cunt and is used as a noun similarly to in English; jævla fitte means fucking cunt.
- Kuk or kukk, meaning cock; used as in English.
- Kuksuger, meaning cocksucker; same as above.
- Pikk, meaning dick, a generally less severe form of kukk.

In addition, English curse words like retard and asshole have become increasingly popular.

Norwegian grammar allows for compound nouns, and therefore virtually infinite combinations of profanities. For instance, the terms fitte (cunt) and tryne (face) may be combined to produce fittetryne (cuntface).

== Less severe profanities ==
Note that profanities considered less severe in one region may be considered more severe in others. Most of these terms have been used on normal TV broadcasts, where profanity has become less taboo in recent years.

- Kjerring refers to an old woman, usually married. It is considered a compliment in Northern and Eastern Norway. In many dialects it is simply used to mean wife.
- Dritt, drit, skitt, skit, are the same as English shit. The English spelling is also common.
- Drittsekk, meaning scumbag (literally shit bag).
- Kyss meg i ræva, literally kiss my ass
- Hestkuk, meaning horse cock. Considered mild in Northern Norway.
- Rævhål, meaning asshole. Alternative spellings include rævhøl, rasshøl, rasshull, and rævhull.
- Helsike, a bowdlerisation of helvete (hell).
- Svenskjævel (commonly spelled in Swedish svenskjävel) roughly meaning Swedish bastard

The following are mild terms considered acceptable for children:

- Hold kjeft, meaning shut up (literally "hold jaw").
- Søren, a bowdlerisation of Satan.
- Pokker, referring to smallpox. Pokker ta deg means (may the) smallpox take you. Often used by people who do not normally swear since it has no sexual or religious connotations.
- Fanken, a bowdlerisation of fanden (faen).
- Fillern, same as above, literally a dustrag.
- Fy flate, a bowdlerisation of fy faen.
