= The Kissing Party =

American indie rock band

Kissing Party
- Origin: Denver, Colorado, United States
- Genres: Indie rock, indie pop
- Label: unsigned
- Members: Deirdre Sage; Gregory Dolan; Joe Hansen; Lee Evans; Shane Reid
- Past members: Darren Dunn; Yana Kucher

The Kissing Party is an indie rock band from Denver. The band is composed of Deirdre Sage (vocals), Gregory Dolan (vocals, guitar), Joe Hansen (lead guitar), Lee Evans (bass) and Shane Reid (drums).

The band released The Hate Album in 2009 with Jason Heller of Denver's Westword referring to them as pure among "douchebags and fashion victims."

== Discography ==
=== Albums ===
- Hold Your Hour And Have Another (CD; 2006)
- Rediscover Lovers (CD; 2007)
- The Hate Album (CD; 2009)
- Waster's Wall (CD; Direct Download; 2011)
- Winter In The Pub (2013)
- Looking Back It Was Romantic But At The Time I Was Suffocating (Digital; 2014), (LP; 2022)
- Mom and Dad (2019)
- Graceless (2023)
