= Kani Sib, Piranshahr =

Kani Sib كاني سيب
- Village
- Location within Iran
- Coordinates: 36°34′21″N 45°14′41″E
- Country: Iran
- Province: West Azerbaijan
- County: Piranshahr
- Bakhsh: Central
- Rural District: Mangur-e Gharbi

Population (2006)
  - Total: 43
- Time zone: UTC+3:30 (IRST)
  - Summer (DST): UTC+4:30 (IRDT)

Kani Sib (Persian: كاني سيب, also Romanized as Kānī Sīb) is a village in Mangur-e Gharbi Rural District, in the Central District of Piranshahr County, West Azerbaijan Province, Iran. At the 2006 census, its population was 43, in 6 families.
