= Matigsalug =

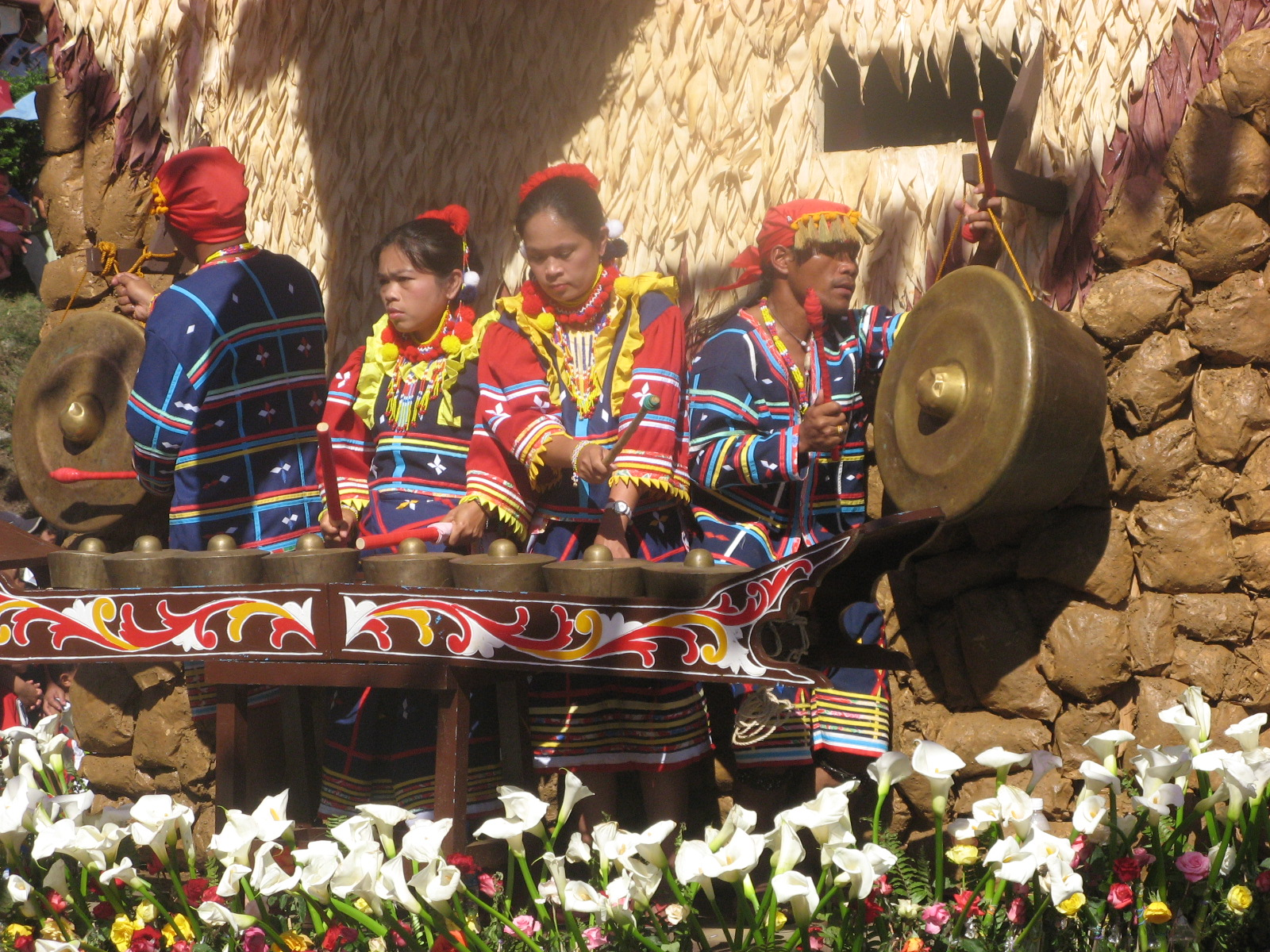

Total population
- 30,176 (2010)

Regions with significant populations
- Philippines (Bukidnon)

Languages
- Native; Matigsalug; Also; Cebuano, Filipino, English

Religion
- Traditional religion and Folk Christianity (Roman Catholic).

Related ethnic groups
- Lumad, other Filipino peoples, other Austronesian peoples

The Matigsalug are an Indigenous group native to the Tigwa-Salug Valley in San Fernando, Bukidnon, in the Philippines. Although often classified under the Manobo ethnolinguistic group, the Matigsalug are a distinct subgroup from the Manobos.

== Way of life ==
The Matigsalug previously practiced a hunting-and-gathering lifestyle with minimal agriculture. Recently, influenced by migrant farmers and traders from the northern Philippines and the island provinces, the Matigsalug shifted to sedentary land cultivation with more or less permanent villages.

Signs of their earlier lifestyle are now found in their cultural and artistic expression, as evidenced by their costumes of bright colored mid-rib blouses and short skirts, and skilled hunting and gathering techniques. This early lifestyle is also depicted in their music, songs, dances, poetry, epic, and spiritual expressions. Matigsalug men wear knee-length tight-fitting pants and turbans decorated with beads and fringed with goat or horse hair.

The traditional Matigsalug house has modest windows which is used as part of an early warning system against mangayaw (lit. 'someone seeking justice').

== Language ==
SIL International has worked in the Matigsalug community for many decades and published a grammatical description of the language. Matigsalug Literacy Education Incorporated operated in the Matigsalug area for many years and won several literacy awards.

Their autonym Matigsalug translates to 'people along the Salug River' in their mother tongue.

== Ancestral lands ==
Matigsalug-Manobo ancestral domain include a 102,324.818-hectare territory that straddles Bukidnon, Davao City, and Arakan Valley in North Cotabato. The Certificate of Ancestral Domain Title (CADT) was issued on October 31, 2003.
