= Surehvan =

Surehvan سوره وان
- Village
- Location within Iran
- Coordinates: 35°26′59″N 46°36′47″E
- Country: Iran
- Province: Kurdistan
- County: Sanandaj
- Bakhsh: Kalatrazan
- Rural District: Kalatrazan

Population (2006)
  - Total: 170
- Time zone: UTC+3:30 (IRST)
  - Summer (DST): UTC+4:30 (IRDT)

Surehvan (Persian: سوره وان, also Romanized as Sūrehvān; also known as Sūrahbān, Sūrbān, Sūreban, Sūrehbān, Sūrehyān, and Sūzhebān) is a village in Kalatrazan Rural District, Kalatrazan District, Sanandaj County, Kurdistan Province, Iran. At the 2006 census, its population was 170, in 38 families. The village is populated by Kurds.
