= Armardeh District =

District in Kurdistan province, Iran

Armardeh District Persian: بخش آرمرده
- District
- Location within Iran Location within Iran Kurdistan
- Coordinates: 35°55′N 45°47′E
- Country: Iran
- Province: Kurdistan
- County: Baneh
- Capital: Armardeh

Population (2016)
  - Total: 9,359
- Time zone: UTC+3:30 (IRST)

Armardeh District (Persian: بخش آرمرده) (Note: Formerly Alut District (بخش الوت)) is in Baneh County, Kurdistan province, Iran. Its capital is the city of Armardeh.

== Demographics ==
=== Population ===
At the time of the 2006 National Census, the district's population was 10,394 in 1,975 households. The following census in 2011 counted 9,601 people in 2,144 households. The 2016 census measured the population of the district as 9,359 inhabitants in 2,501 households all of them being Kurds.

=== Administrative divisions ===
Armardeh District Population
Administrative Divisions	2006	2011	2016
Beleh Keh RD	2,691	2,546	2,448
Posht-e Arbaba RD	5,641	4,706	4,606
Armardeh (city)	2,062	2,349	2,305
Total	10,394	9,601	9,359
RD = Rural District
