= Baneh County =

County in Kurdistan province, Iran

Baneh County Persian: شهرستان بانه
- County
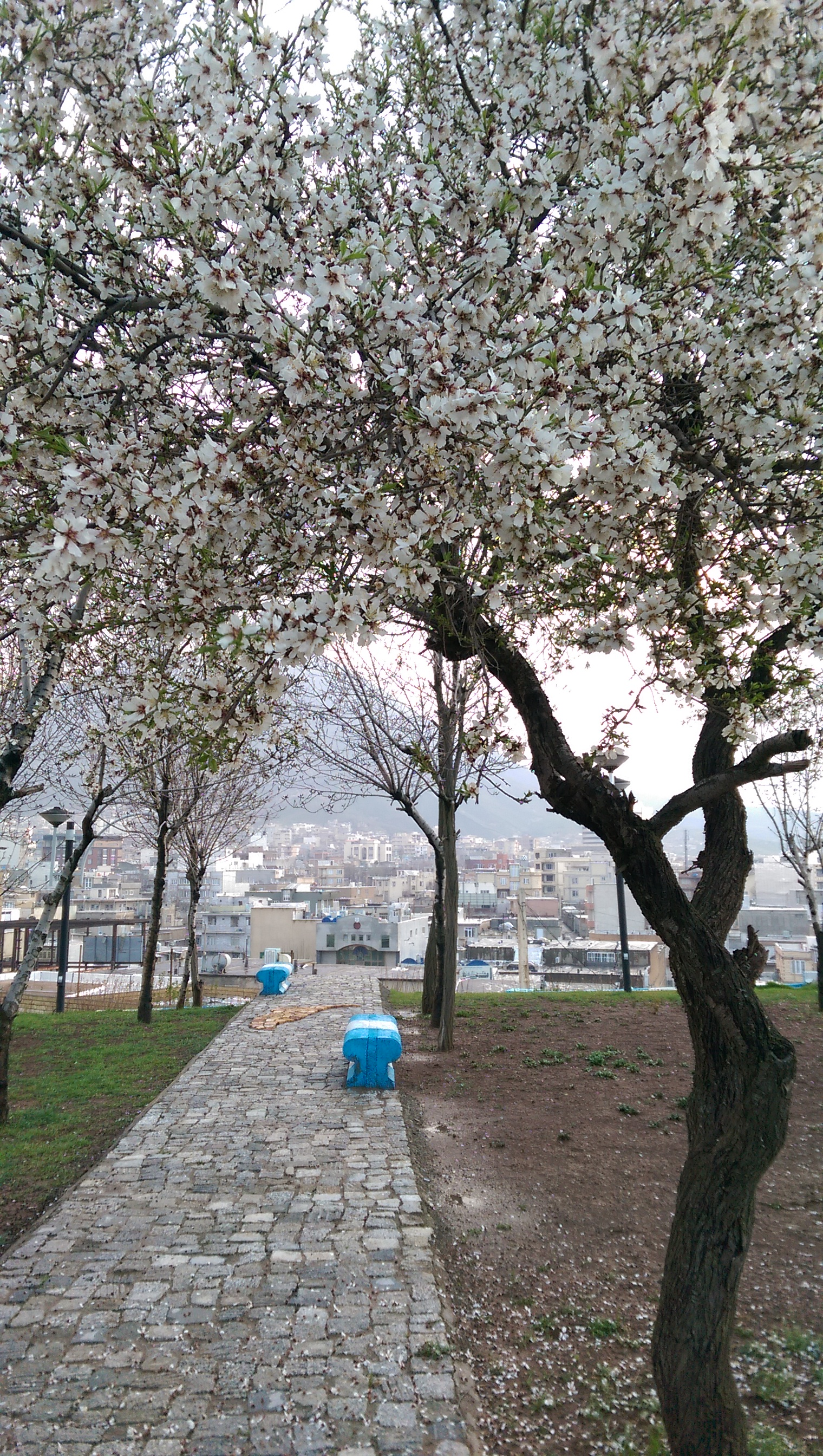
- Spring in the city of Baneh

- Location of Baneh County in Kurdistan province

- Location of Kurdistan province in Iran
- Coordinates: 36°00′N 45°52′E
- Country: Iran
- Province: Kurdistan
- Capital: Baneh
- Districts: Central, Armardeh, Namshir, Nanur

Population (2016)
  - Total: 158,690
- Time zone: UTC+3:30 (IRST)

Baneh County (Persian: شهرستان بانه) is in Kurdistan province, Iran. Its capital is the city of Baneh.

== Demographics ==
=== Population ===
At the time of the 2006 National Census, the county's population was 116,773 in 24,709 households. The following census in 2011 counted 132,565 people in 32,669 households. The 2016 census measured the population of the county as 158,690 in 43,772 households.

=== Administrative divisions ===
Baneh County's population history and administrative structure over three consecutive censuses are shown in the following table.

Baneh County Population
Administrative Divisions	2006	2011	2016
Central District	78,016	96,243	122,439
Shuy RD	8,381	11,053	12,221
Baneh (city)	69,635	85,190	110,218
Armardeh District (Note: Formerly Alut District at the 2006 census)	10,394	9,601	9,359
Beleh Keh RD	2,691	2,546	2,448
Posht-e Arbaba RD	5,641	4,706	4,606
Armardeh (city)	2,062	2,349	2,305
Namshir District	19,018	17,328	17,423
Bowalhasan RD	4,937	4,527	5,614
Kani Sur RD	6,307	5,765	5,435
Nameh Shir RD	6,643	5,729	5,090
Kani Sur (city)	1,131	1,307	1,284
Nanur District	9,345	9,393	9,469
Buin RD	5,172	4,524	4,467
Nanur RD	3,104	3,411	3,484
Buin-e Sofla (city)	1,069	1,458	1,518
Total	116,773	132,565	158,690
RD = Rural District

== See also ==
Media related to Baneh County at Wikimedia Commons
