= Bodaghabad, Razavi Khorasan =

Village in Razavi Khorasan province, Iran

Bodaghabad Persian: بداغ اباد
- Village
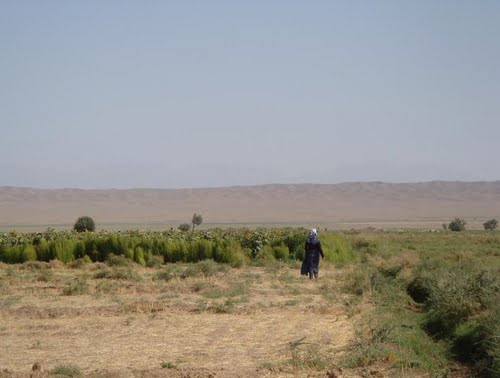
- Landscape in the village of Bodaghabad

- Location within Iran
- Coordinates: 36°35′55″N 57°40′33″E
- Country: Iran
- Province: Razavi Khorasan
- County: Joveyn
- District: Atamalek
- Rural District: Zarrin

Population (2016)
  - Total: 603
- Time zone: UTC+3:30 (IRST)

Bodaghabad (Persian: بداغ اباد) (Note: Also romanized as Bodāghābād) is a village in, and the capital of, Zarrin Rural District in Atamalek District of Joveyn County, Razavi Khorasan province, Iran.

Most residents have been relocated to bigger cities such as Mashhad and Tehran. In the Iranian New Year Ceremony, they usually come back to the village. The village population goes up to more than 2,000 for a short period.

== Demographics ==
=== Population ===
At the time of the 2006 National Census, the village's population was 607 in 167 households, when it was in Hokmabad Rural District of the former Joveyn District in Sabzevar County. The following census in 2011 counted 585 people in 179 households, by which time the district had been separated from the county in the establishment of Joveyn County. The rural district was transferred to the new Atamalek District, and Bodaghabad was transferred to Zarrin Rural District created in the same district. The 2016 census measured the population of the village as 603 people in 195 households.

== Culture ==
In the recent decade, most traditional cultures have been forgotten. However, some traditions such as "Sar-e Hammam", "Nar Zadan", and "Chavoshi" still can be seen in marriage ceremonies. "Sar-e Hammam" is the last groom shower before starting his new life with his wife, people dancing outside of a public bathroom until the groom comes out and accompanies them in dancing. "Nar Zadan" is a tradition that bride, before going to her new home, throws a pomegranate behind and unmarried girls try to catch it, and the winner will be the next bride. "Chavoshi" is some traditional poems sung by old men, mostly in ceremonies. Traditional foods like "jeshvareh" and "lozzook" are still being prepared by old women in this village.

== Amenities ==
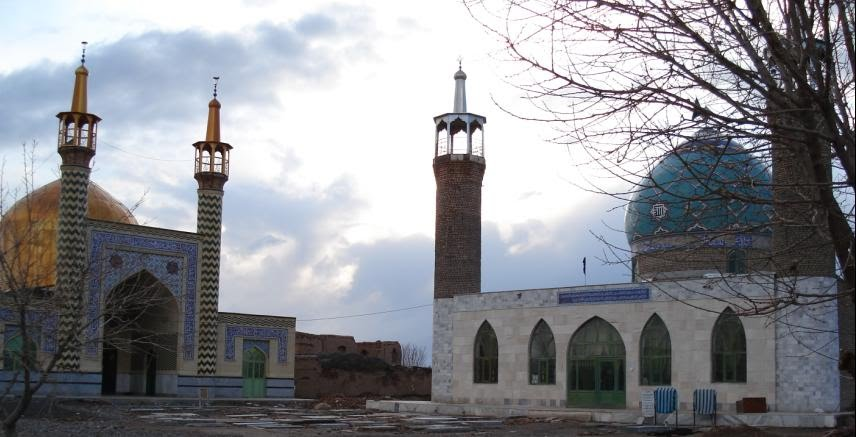
Bodaghabad's holy shrines

The village has one elementary school and one high school, shared and private public showers, two mosques, one clinic and two holy shrines. An asphalt access road that joins Bodaghabad to Hokmabad, the nearest populated area. Bodaghabad is the center of Zarrin Rural District although it is not the largest village in the area. Drinking water, electricity and phone have been provided for this village and natural gas is planned to be provided in near future.
