= Kalateh-ye Arab, Razavi Khorasan =

Village in Razavi Khorasan province, Iran

Kalateh-ye Arab Persian: كلاته عرب
- Village
- Location within Iran
- Coordinates: 36°36′59″N 57°37′15″E
- Country: Iran
- Province: Razavi Khorasan
- County: Joveyn
- District: Atamalek
- Rural District: Zarrin

Population (2016)
  - Total: 1,449
- Time zone: UTC+3:30 (IRST)

Kalateh-ye Arab (Persian: كلاته عرب) (Note: Also romanized as Kalāteh ‘Arab and Kalāteh-ye ‘Arab) is a village in Zarrin Rural District of Atamalek District in Joveyn County, Razavi Khorasan province, Iran.

== Demographics ==
=== Population ===
At the time of the 2006 National Census, the village's population was 1,196 in 355 households, when it was in Hokmabad Rural District of the former Joveyn District in Sabzevar County. The following census in 2011 counted 1,186 people in 380 households, by which time the district had been separated from the county in the establishment of Joveyn County. The rural district was transferred to the new Atamalek District, and Kalateh-ye Arab was transferred to Zarrin Rural District created in the same district. The 2016 census measured the population of the village as 1,449 people in 460 households, the most populous in its rural district.
