= Ebrahimabad-e Bala Joveyn =

Village in Razavi Khorasan province, Iran

Ebrahimabad-e Bala Joveyn Persian: ابراهيم ابادبالاجوين
- Village
- Location within Iran
- Coordinates: 36°36′23″N 57°39′57″E
- Country: Iran
- Province: Razavi Khorasan
- County: Joveyn
- District: Atamalek
- Rural District: Zarrin

Population (2016)
  - Total: 98
- Time zone: UTC+3:30 (IRST)

Ebrahimabad-e Bala Joveyn (Persian: ابراهيم ابادبالاجوين) (Note: Also romanized as Ebrāhīmābād-e Bālā Joveyn, Ebrahimabad-e Bala Jowayin, and Ebrāhīmābād-e Bālā Jowayin; also known as Bāqeyrī, Ebrāhīmābād, and Ibrāhīmābād) is a village in Zarrin Rural District of Atamalek District in Joveyn County, Razavi Khorasan province, Iran.

== Demographics ==
=== Population ===
At the time of the 2006 National Census, the village's population was 88 in 31 households, when it was in Hokmabad Rural District of the former Joveyn District in Sabzevar County. The following census in 2011 counted 78 people in 26 households, by which time the district had been separated from the county in the establishment of Joveyn County. The rural district was transferred to the new Atamalek District, and Ebrahimabad-e Bala Joveyn was transferred to Zarrin Rural District created in the same district. The 2016 census measured the population of the village as 98 people in 39 households.
