= Hoseynabad-e Mirza Momen =

Village in Razavi Khorasan province, Iran

Hoseynabad-e Mirza Momen Persian: حسين ابادميرزامومن
- Village
- Location within Iran
- Coordinates: 36°34′32″N 57°44′28″E
- Country: Iran
- Province: Razavi Khorasan
- County: Joveyn
- District: Atamalek
- Rural District: Zarrin

Population (2016)
  - Total: 480
- Time zone: UTC+3:30 (IRST)

Hoseynabad-e Mirza Momen (Persian: حسين ابادميرزامومن) (Note: Also romanized as Ḩoseynābād-e Mīrzā Mo‘men; also known as Ḩoseynābād) is a village in Zarrin Rural District of Atamalek District in Joveyn County, Razavi Khorasan province, Iran.

== Demographics ==
=== Population ===
At the time of the 2006 National Census, the village's population was 614 in 160 households, when it was in Hokmabad Rural District of the former Joveyn District in Sabzevar County. The following census in 2011 counted 475 people in 151 households, by which time the district had been separated from the county in the establishment of Joveyn County. The rural district was transferred to the new Atamalek District, and Hoseynabad-e Mirza Momen was transferred to Zarrin Rural District created in the same district. The 2016 census measured the population of the village as 480 people in 163 households.
