= Rahmatabad, Joveyn =

Village in Razavi Khorasan province, Iran

Rahmatabad Persian: رحمت اباد
- Village
- Location within Iran
- Coordinates: 36°32′38″N 57°49′20″E
- Country: Iran
- Province: Razavi Khorasan
- County: Joveyn
- District: Atamalek
- Rural District: Zarrin

Population (2016)
  - Total: 651
- Time zone: UTC+3:30 (IRST)

Rahmatabad (Persian: رحمت اباد) (Note: Also romanized as Raḩmatābād) is a village in Zarrin Rural District of Atamalek District in Joveyn County, Razavi Khorasan province, Iran.

== Demographics ==
=== Population ===
At the time of the 2006 National Census, the village's population was 524 in 115 households, when it was in Hokmabad Rural District of the former Joveyn District in Sabzevar County. The following census in 2011 counted 617 people in 152 households, by which time the district had been separated from the county in the establishment of Joveyn County. The rural district was transferred to the new Atamalek District, and Rahmatabad was transferred to Zarrin Rural District created in the same district. The 2016 census measured the population of the village as 617 people in 152 households.
