= Ahmadabad, Joveyn =

Village in Razavi Khorasan province, Iran

Ahmadabad Persian: احمداباد
- Village
- Location within Iran
- Coordinates: 36°35′29″N 57°42′10″E
- Country: Iran
- Province: Razavi Khorasan
- County: Joveyn
- District: Atamalek
- Rural District: Zarrin

Population (2016)
  - Total: 590
- Time zone: UTC+3:30 (IRST)

Ahmadabad (Persian: احمداباد) (Note: Also romanized as Aḩmadābād) is a village in Zarrin Rural District of Atamalek District in Joveyn County, Razavi Khorasan province, Iran.

== Demographics ==
=== Population ===
At the time of the 2006 National Census, the village's population was 694 in 174 households, when it was in Hokmabad Rural District of the former Joveyn District in Sabzevar County. The following census in 2011 counted 602 people in 172 households, by which time the district had been separated from the county in the establishment of Joveyn County. The rural district was transferred to the new Atamalek District, and Ahmadabad was transferred to Zarrin Rural District created in the same district. The 2016 census measured the population of the village as 590 people in 180 households.
