= Arg-e Now Juy =

Village in Razavi Khorasan province, Iran

Arg-e Now Juy Persian: ارگ نوجوي
- Village
- Location within Iran
- Coordinates: 36°34′18″N 57°15′45″E
- Country: Iran
- Province: Razavi Khorasan
- County: Joveyn
- District: Central
- Rural District: Pirakuh

Population (2016)
  - Total: 711
- Time zone: UTC+3:30 (IRST)

Arg-e Now Juy (Persian: ارگ نوجوی) (Note: Also romanized as Arg Now Jūy and Arg-e Now Jūy; also known as Arg-e Now Jūdī, Ark, Arqeh-ye Now Jūy, and ‘Arq-i-Nu Jūi) is a village in Pirakuh Rural District of the Central District in Joveyn County, Razavi Khorasan province, Iran.

== Demographics ==
=== Population ===
At the time of the 2006 National Census, the village's population was 763 in 176 households, when it was in the former Joveyn District of Sabzevar County. The following census in 2011 counted 705 people in 191 households, by which time the district had been separated from the county in the establishment of Joveyn County. The rural district was transferred to the new Central District. The 2016 census measured the population of the village as 711 people in 207 households.
