= Fathabad-e Now =

Village in Razavi Khorasan province, Iran

Fathabad-e Now Persian: فتح ابادنو
- Village
- Location within Iran
- Coordinates: 36°43′25″N 57°22′03″E
- Country: Iran
- Province: Razavi Khorasan
- County: Joveyn
- District: Central
- Rural District: Bala Joveyn

Population (2016)
  - Total: 881
- Time zone: UTC+3:30 (IRST)

Fathabad-e Now (Persian: فتح ابادنو) (Note: Also romanized as Fatḩābād-e Now; also known as Fatḩābād (فتح اباد)) is a village in Bala Joveyn Rural District of the Central District in Joveyn County, Razavi Khorasan province, Iran.

== Demographics ==
=== Population ===
At the time of the 2006 National Census, the village's population was 597 in 140 households, when it was in the former Joveyn District of Sabzevar County. The following census in 2011 counted 734 people in 200 households, by which time the district had been separated from the county in the establishment of Joveyn County. The rural district was transferred to the new Central District. The 2016 census measured the population of the village as 881 people in 279 households.
