= Hajjiabad-e Bazzazi =

Village in Razavi Khorasan province, Iran

Hajjiabad-e Bazzazi Persian: حاجي ابادبزازي
- Village
- Location within Iran
- Coordinates: 36°40′53″N 57°29′49″E
- Country: Iran
- Province: Razavi Khorasan
- County: Joveyn
- District: Atamalek
- Rural District: Hokmabad

Population (2016)
  - Total: 196
- Time zone: UTC+3:30 (IRST)

Hajjiabad-e Bazzazi (Persian: حاجي ابادبزازي) (Note: Also romanized as Ḩājjīābād-e Bazzāzī) is a village in Hokmabad Rural District of Atamalek District in Joveyn County, Razavi Khorasan province, Iran.

== Demographics ==
=== Population ===
At the time of the 2006 National Census, the village's population was 435 in 110 households, when it was in the former Joveyn District of Sabzevar County. The following census in 2011 counted 96 people in 28 households, by which time the district had been separated from the county in the establishment of Joveyn County. The rural district was transferred to the new Atamalek District. The 2016 census measured the population of the village as 196 people in 59 households.
