= Ebrahimabad Abu Talab =

Village in Razavi Khorasan province, Iran

Ebrahimabad Abu Talab Persian: ابراهيم ابادابوطالب
- Village
- Location within Iran
- Coordinates: 36°40′04″N 57°31′41″E
- Country: Iran
- Province: Razavi Khorasan
- County: Joveyn
- District: Atamalek
- Rural District: Hokmabad

Population (2016)
  - Total: 570
- Time zone: UTC+3:30 (IRST)

Ebrahimabad Abu Talab (Persian: ابراهيم ابادابوطالب) (Note: Also romanized as Ebrāhīmābād Ābū Tālab; also known as Ebrāhīmābād (ابراهيم اباد)) is a village in Hokmabad Rural District of Atamalek District in Joveyn County, Razavi Khorasan province, Iran.

== Demographics ==
=== Population ===
At the time of the 2006 National Census, the village's population was 601 in 138 households, when it was in the former Joveyn District of Sabzevar County. The following census in 2011 counted 598 people in 155 households, by which time the district had been separated from the county in the establishment of Joveyn County. The rural district was transferred to the new Atamalek District. The 2016 census measured the population of the village as 570 people in 164 households.
