= Abbasabad-e Malek =

Village in Razavi Khorasan province, Iran

Abbasabad-e Malek Persian: عباس ابادملك
- Village
- Location within Iran
- Coordinates: 36°41′25″N 57°27′54″E
- Country: Iran
- Province: Razavi Khorasan
- County: Joveyn
- District: Central
- Rural District: Bala Joveyn

Population (2016)
  - Total: 951
- Time zone: UTC+3:30 (IRST)

Abbasabad-e Malek (Persian: عباس ابادملك) (Note: Also romanized as ‘Abbāsābād-e Malek) is a village in Bala Joveyn Rural District of the Central District in Joveyn County, Razavi Khorasan province, Iran.

== Demographics ==
=== Population ===
At the time of the 2006 National Census, the village's population was 746 in 195 households, when it was in the former Joveyn District of Sabzevar County. The following census in 2011 counted 882 people in 261 households, by which time the district had been separated from the county in the establishment of Joveyn County. The rural district was transferred to the new Central District. The 2016 census measured the population of the village as 951 people in 292 households.
