= Bid Khowr =

Village in Razavi Khorasan province, Iran

Bid Khowr Persian: بيدخور
- Village
- Location within Iran
- Coordinates: 36°31′05″N 57°26′04″E
- Country: Iran
- Province: Razavi Khorasan
- County: Joveyn
- District: Central
- Rural District: Pirakuh

Population (2016)
  - Total: 282
- Time zone: UTC+3:30 (IRST)

Bid Khowr (Persian: بيدخور,) (Note: Also romanized as Bīd Khowr, Bid Khvor, and Bīd Khvor; also known as Bīd Khor) is a village in Pirakuh Rural District of the Central District in Joveyn County, Razavi Khorasan province, Iran.

== Demographics ==
=== Population ===
At the time of the 2006 National Census, the village's population was 316 in 88 households, when it was in the former Joveyn District of Sabzevar County. The following census in 2011 counted 269 people in 85 households, by which time the district had been separated from the county in the establishment of Joveyn County. The rural district was transferred to the new Central District. The 2016 census measured the population of the village as 282 people in 95 households.
