= Kalateh-ye Shahidan =

Village in Razavi Khorasan province, Iran

Kalateh-ye Shahidan Persian: كلاته شهيدان
- Village
- Location within Iran
- Coordinates: 36°39′36″N 57°32′15″E
- Country: Iran
- Province: Razavi Khorasan
- County: Joveyn
- District: Atamalek
- Rural District: Hokmabad

Population (2016)
  - Total: 191
- Time zone: UTC+3:30 (IRST)

Kalateh-ye Shahidan (Persian: كلاته شهيدان) (Note: Also romanized as Kalāteh-ye Shahīdān; also known as Kalāteh-ye Qāderī (كلاته قادري)) is a village in Hokmabad Rural District of Atamalek District in Joveyn County, Razavi Khorasan province, Iran.

== Demographics ==
=== Population ===
At the time of the 2006 National Census, the village's population was 259 in 66 households, when it was in the former Joveyn District of Sabzevar County. The following census in 2011 counted 239 people in 68 households, by which time the district had been separated from the county in the establishment of Joveyn County. The rural district was transferred to the new Atamalek District. The 2016 census measured the population of the village as 191 people in 62 households.
