= Menj-e Shirin =

Village in Razavi Khorasan province, Iran

Menj-e Shirin Persian: منجشيرين
- Village
- Location within Iran
- Coordinates: 36°33′17″N 57°19′51″E
- Country: Iran
- Province: Razavi Khorasan
- County: Joveyn
- District: Central
- Rural District: Pirakuh

Population (2016)
  - Total: 327
- Time zone: UTC+3:30 (IRST)

Menj-e Shirin (Persian: منجشيرين) (Note: Also romanized as Menj-e Shīrīn) is a village in Pirakuh Rural District of the Central District in Joveyn County, Razavi Khorasan province, Iran.

== Demographics ==
=== Population ===
At the time of the 2006 National Census, the village's population was 221 in 58 households, when it was in the former Joveyn District of Sabzevar County. The following census in 2011 counted 243 people in 74 households, by which time the district had been separated from the county in the establishment of Joveyn County. The rural district was transferred to the new Central District. The 2016 census measured the population of the village as 327 people in 105 households.
