= Kamayestan =

Kamayestan كمايستان
- Village
- Location within Iran
- Coordinates: 36°41′01″N 57°20′17″E
- Country: Iran
- Province: Razavi Khorasan
- County: Jowayin
- Bakhsh: Central
- Rural District: Bala Jowayin

Population (2006)
  - Total: 553
- Time zone: UTC+3:30 (IRST)
  - Summer (DST): UTC+4:30 (IRDT)

Kamayestan (Persian: كمايستان, also Romanized as Kamāyestān and Komāyestān; also known as Kumīsdān) is a village in Bala Jowayin Rural District, in the Central District of Jowayin County, Razavi Khorasan Province, Iran. At the 2006 census, its population was 553, in 141 families.
