= Kalateh-ye Meymari =

Village in Razavi Khorasan province, Iran

Kalateh-ye Meymari Persian: كلاته ميمري
- Village
- Location within Iran
- Coordinates: 36°43′52″N 57°22′38″E
- Country: Iran
- Province: Razavi Khorasan
- County: Joveyn
- District: Central
- Rural District: Bala Joveyn

Population (2016)
  - Total: 1,339
- Time zone: UTC+3:30 (IRST)

Kalateh-ye Meymari (Persian: كلاته ميمري) (Note: Also romanized as Kalāteh-ye Meymarī; also known as Kohneh Shahr) is a village in Bala Joveyn Rural District of the Central District in Joveyn County, Razavi Khorasan province, Iran.

== Demographics ==
=== Population ===
At the time of the 2006 National Census, the village's population was 1,438 in 368 households, when it was in the former Joveyn District of Sabzevar County. The following census in 2011 counted 1,384 people in 408 households, by which time the district had been separated from the county in the establishment of Joveyn County. The rural district was transferred to the new Central District. The 2016 census measured the population of the village as 1,339 people in 443 households.
