= Shahrak-e Karkhaneh Qand Joveyn =

Shahrak-e Karkhaneh Qand Jowayin شهرك كارخانه قندجوين
- Village
- Country: Iran
- Province: Razavi Khorasan
- County: Jowayin
- Bakhsh: Central
- Rural District: Bala Jowayin

Population (2006)
  - Total: 233
- Time zone: UTC+3:30 (IRST)
  - Summer (DST): UTC+4:30 (IRDT)

Shahrak-e Karkhaneh Qand Jowayin (Persian: شهرك كارخانه قندجوين, also Romanized as Shahraḵ-e Kārkhāneh Qand Jowayin) is a village in Bala Jowayin Rural District, in the Central District of Jowayin County, Razavi Khorasan Province, Iran. At the 2006 census, its population was 233, in 61 families.
