= Razi, Razavi Khorasan =

Village in Razavi Khorasan province, Iran

Razi Persian: رازئ
- Village
- Location within Iran
- Coordinates: 36°44′57″N 57°16′24″E
- Country: Iran
- Province: Razavi Khorasan
- County: Joveyn
- District: Central
- Rural District: Bala Joveyn

Population (2016)
  - Total: 4,250
- Time zone: UTC+3:30 (IRST)

Razi (Persian: رازئ) (Note: Also known as Rāz' and Raz) is a village in Bala Joveyn Rural District of the Central District in Joveyn County, Razavi Khorasan province, Iran.

== Demographics ==
=== Population ===
At the time of the 2006 National Census, the village's population was 4,057 in 1,043 households, when it was in the former Joveyn District of Sabzevar County. The following census in 2011 counted 4,253 people in 1,203 households, by which time the district had been separated from the county in the establishment of Joveyn County. The rural district was transferred to the new Central District. The 2016 census measured the population of the village as 4,250 people in 1,261 households, the most populous in its rural district.
