= Mianabad (disambiguation) =

Mianabad is a village in Semnan Province, Iran

Mianabad, Meyanabad or Miyanabad (Persian: ميان اباد) may also refer to:

- Mianabad, former name of Esfarayen, a city in North Khorasan Province, Iran
- Mianabad-e Malek, a village in Golestan Province, Iran
- Mianabad, Hamadan, a village in Hamadan Province, Iran
- Mianabad, Jowayin, a village in Jowayin County, Razavi Khorasan Province, Iran
- Mianabad-e Joveyn, a village in Jowayin County, Razavi Khorasan Province, Iran
