= Ahmadabad-e Malek =

Village in Razavi Khorasan province, Iran

Ahmadabad-e Malek Persian: احمدابادملك
- Village
- Location within Iran
- Coordinates: 36°41′05″N 57°27′27″E
- Country: Iran
- Province: Razavi Khorasan
- County: Joveyn
- District: Central
- Rural District: Bala Joveyn

Population (2016)
  - Total: 953
- Time zone: UTC+3:30 (IRST)

Ahmadabad-e Malek (Persian: احمدابادملك) (Note: Also romanized as Aḩmadābād-e Malek) is a village in Bala Joveyn Rural District of the Central District in Joveyn County, Razavi Khorasan province, Iran.

== Demographics ==
=== Population ===
At the time of the 2006 National Census, the village's population was 708 in 173 households, when it was in the former Joveyn District of Sabzevar County. The following census in 2011 counted 929 people in 266 households, by which time the district had been separated from the county in the establishment of Joveyn County. The rural district was transferred to the new Central District. The 2016 census measured the population of the village as 953 people in 290 households.
