= Sirghan =

Sirghan سيرغان
- Village
- Location within Iran
- Coordinates: 36°45′22″N 57°21′06″E
- Country: Iran
- Province: Razavi Khorasan
- County: Jowayin
- Bakhsh: Central
- Rural District: Bala Jowayin

Population (2006)
  - Total: 275
- Time zone: UTC+3:30 (IRST)
  - Summer (DST): UTC+4:30 (IRDT)

Sirghan (Persian: سيرغان, also Romanized as Sīrghān) is a village in Bala Jowayin Rural District, in the Central District of Jowayin County, Razavi Khorasan Province, Iran. At the 2006 census, its population was 275, in 72 families.
