= Delkabad =

Delkabad دلك اباد
- Village
- Location within Iran
- Coordinates: 36°31′09″N 57°30′05″E
- Country: Iran
- Province: Razavi Khorasan
- County: Jowayin
- Bakhsh: Central
- Rural District: Pirakuh

Population (2006)
  - Total: 126
- Time zone: UTC+3:30 (IRST)
  - Summer (DST): UTC+4:30 (IRDT)

Delkabad (Persian: دلك اباد, also Romanized as Delkābād) is a village in Pirakuh Rural District, in the Central District of Jowayin County, Razavi Khorasan Province, Iran. At the 2006 census, its population was 126, in 45 families.
