= Ramshin =

Village in Razavi Khorasan province, Iran

Ramshin Persian: رامشين
- Village
- Location within Iran
- Coordinates: 36°30′14″N 57°27′09″E
- Country: Iran
- Province: Razavi Khorasan
- County: Joveyn
- District: Central
- Rural District: Pirakuh

Population (2016)
  - Total: 482
- Time zone: UTC+3:30 (IRST)

Ramshin (Persian: رامشين) (Note: Also romanized as Rāmshīn; also known as Pūnam) is a village in Pirakuh Rural District of the Central District in Joveyn County, Razavi Khorasan province, Iran.

== Demographics ==
=== Population ===
At the time of the 2006 National Census, the village's population was 403 in 137 households, when it was in the former Joveyn District of Sabzevar County. The following census in 2011 counted 371 people in 133 households, by which time the district had been separated from the county in the establishment of Joveyn County. The rural district was transferred to the new Central District. The 2016 census measured the population of the village as 482 people in 168 households.
