= Qoliabad =

Qoliabad (Persian: قلي اباد) may refer to:

- Qoliabad, Golestan
- Qoliabad, Hamadan
- Qoliabad, Kermanshah
- Qoliabad, Kurdistan
