= Khorramabad, Joveyn =

Village in Razavi Khorasan province, Iran

Khorramabad Persian: خرم اباد
- Village
- Location within Iran
- Coordinates: 36°39′05″N 57°33′52″E
- Country: Iran
- Province: Razavi Khorasan
- County: Joveyn
- District: Atamalek
- Rural District: Hokmabad

Population (2016)
  - Total: 1,482
- Time zone: UTC+3:30 (IRST)

Khorramabad (Persian: خرم اباد) (Note: Also romanized as Khorramābād) is a village in Hokmabad Rural District of Atamalek District in Joveyn County, Razavi Khorasan province, Iran.

== Demographics ==
=== Population ===
At the time of the 2006 National Census, the village's population was 1,479 in 372 households, when it was in the former Joveyn District of Sabzevar County. The following census in 2011 counted 1,516 people in 427 households, by which time the district had been separated from the county in the establishment of Joveyn County. The rural district was transferred to the new Atamalek District. The 2016 census measured the population of the village as 1,482 people in 434 households.
