= Bid =

Bid or BID may refer to:

== Offer ==
- Bidding, making a price offer in an auction, stock exchange, or card games
- Bid, in a financial market, the price a market maker will buy a commodity at to buy a product in such a way; see bid–ask spread
- Bid manager, an executive sales role within an organization, responsible for managing bids
- Bid price, a price offered for a good by a potential buyer or a price offered by a potential vendor to perform a specific job
- Bid, a formal invitation to join a fraternity or sorority

== Places ==
- Bid, Razavi Khorasan, a village in Razavi Khorasan Province, Iran
- Bid, South Khorasan, a village in South Khorasan Province, Iran
- Beed, a town in Maharashtra, India is sometimes referred to as Bid
- Block Island State Airport, by IATA Code
- Beth Israel Deaconess Medical Center, a hospital in Boston, USA

== Science, medicine and technology ==
- BH3 interacting domain death agonist, a pro-apoptotic protein
- Binary integer decimal
- Brought in dead, a patient found dead upon the arrival of medical assistance
- bis in die, (Latin for "twice daily"), a medication dosage
- Bugtraq ID, a list of security vulnerabilities
- Bridge ID, used by the Spanning Tree Protocol
- Body integrity dysphoria, mental disorder
- Body image disturbance, common symptom of eating disorders

== Other uses ==
- Bid, lead singer and songwriter of the band The Monochrome Set
- Before I Disappear, a 2014 film
- Shop at Bid, a defunct British shopping channel formerly known as Bid
- Business improvement district
- Sotheby's, by stock ticker symbol
- French, Portuguese and Spanish acronym for the Inter-American Development Bank
