= Jalambadan =

Village in Razavi Khorasan province, Iran

Jalambadan Persian: جلمبادان
- Village
- Location within Iran
- Coordinates: 36°28′22″N 57°26′33″E
- Country: Iran
- Province: Razavi Khorasan
- County: Joveyn
- District: Central
- Rural District: Pirakuh

Population (2016)
  - Total: 547
- Time zone: UTC+3:30 (IRST)

Jalambadan (Persian: جلمبادان) (Note: Also romanized as Jalambādān; also known as Jolombārān) is a village in Pirakuh Rural District of the Central District in Joveyn County, Razavi Khorasan province, Iran.

== Demographics ==
=== Population ===
At the time of the 2006 National Census, the village's population was 673 in 225 households, when it was in the former Joveyn District of Sabzevar County. The following census in 2011 counted 558 people in 215 households, by which time the district had been separated from the county in the establishment of Joveyn County. The rural district was transferred to the new Central District. The 2016 census measured the population of the village as 547 people in 199 households.
