= Hajjiabad-e Hajji Safar =

Village in Razavi Khorasan province, Iran

Hajjiabad-e Hajji Safar Persian: حاجي ابادحاج صفر
- Village
- Location within Iran
- Coordinates: 36°43′36″N 57°21′25″E
- Country: Iran
- Province: Razavi Khorasan
- County: Joveyn
- District: Central
- Rural District: Bala Joveyn

Population (2016)
  - Total: 1,941
- Time zone: UTC+3:30 (IRST)

Hajjiabad-e Hajji Safar (Persian: حاجي ابادحاج صفر) (Note: Also romanized as Ḩājjīābād-e Ḩājjī Şafar; also known as Ḩājjīābād) is a village in Bala Joveyn Rural District of the Central District in Joveyn County, Razavi Khorasan province, Iran.

== Demographics ==
=== Population ===
At the time of the 2006 National Census, the village's population was 1,858 in 447 households, when it was in the former Joveyn District of Sabzevar County. The following census in 2011 counted 2,142 people in 595 households, by which time the district had been separated from the county in the establishment of Joveyn County. The rural district was transferred to the new Central District. The 2016 census measured the population of the village as 1,941 people in 565 households.
