= Esmailabad, Joveyn =

Village in Razavi Khorasan province, Iran

Esmailabad Persian: اسماعيل اباد
- Village
- Location within Iran
- Coordinates: 36°40′26″N 57°28′30″E
- Country: Iran
- Province: Razavi Khorasan
- County: Joveyn
- District: Atamalek
- Rural District: Hokmabad

Population (2016)
  - Total: 720
- Time zone: UTC+3:30 (IRST)

Esmailabad (Persian: اسماعيل اباد) (Note: Also romanized as Esmā‘īlābād) is a village in Hokmabad Rural District of Atamalek District in Joveyn County, Razavi Khorasan province, Iran.

== Demographics ==
=== Population ===
At the time of the 2006 National Census, the village's population was 775 in 202 households, when it was in the former Joveyn District of Sabzevar County. The following census in 2011 counted 661 people in 195 households, by which time the district had been separated from the county in the establishment of Joveyn County. The rural district was transferred to the new Atamalek District. The 2016 census measured the population of the village as 720 people in 236 households.
