= Barghamad =

Village in Razavi Khorasan province, Iran

Barghamad Persian: برغمد
- Village
- Location within Iran
- Coordinates: 36°29′37″N 57°34′08″E
- Country: Iran
- Province: Razavi Khorasan
- County: Joveyn
- District: Central
- Rural District: Pirakuh

Population (2016)
  - Total: 2,449
- Time zone: UTC+3:30 (IRST)
- Website: www.barghamad.com

Barghamad (Persian: برغمد) (Note: Also known as Barkāmad) is a village in, and the capital of, Pirakuh Rural District in the Central District of Joveyn County, Razavi Khorasan province, Iran.

== Demographics ==
=== Population ===
At the time of the 2006 National Census, the village's population was 1,647 in 568 households, when it was in the former Joveyn District of Sabzevar County. The following census in 2011 counted 3,377 people in 885 households, by which time the district had been separated from the county in the establishment of Joveyn County. The rural district was transferred to the new Central District. The 2016 census measured the population of the village as 2,449 people in 833 households, the most populous in its rural district.
