= Bezhi =

Bezhi بژي
- Village
- Location within Iran
- Coordinates: 35°57′48″N 45°59′54″E
- Country: Iran
- Province: Kurdistan
- County: Baneh
- Bakhsh: Nanur
- Rural District: Buin

Population (2006)
  - Total: 199
- Time zone: UTC+3:30 (IRST)
  - Summer (DST): UTC+4:30 (IRDT)

Bezhi (Persian: بژي, also Romanized as Bezhī) is a village in Buin Rural District, Nanur District, Baneh County, Kurdistan Province, Iran. At the 2006 census, its population was 199, in 35 families. The village is populated by Kurds.
