= Buin, Iran =

Buin (Persian: بوئين) in Iran may refer to:

- Buin, Gilan
- Buin va Miandasht
- Buin Zahra
- Buin-e Olya, Kurdistan Province
- Buin-e Sofla, Kurdistan Province
- Buin, Zanjan
- Buin Rural District, in Kurdistan Province
