= Kuyreh Guyzeh =

Kuyreh Guyzeh كويره گويزه
- Village
- Location within Iran
- Coordinates: 35°58′02″N 46°04′04″E
- Country: Iran
- Province: Kurdistan
- County: Baneh
- Bakhsh: Nanur
- Rural District: Buin

Population (2006)
  - Total: 45
- Time zone: UTC+3:30 (IRST)
  - Summer (DST): UTC+4:30 (IRDT)

Kuyreh Guyzeh (Persian: كويره گويزه, also Romanized as Kūyreh Gūyzeh; also known as Kūreh Gūzeh and Kūyreh Kūyz) is a village in Buin Rural District, Nanur District, Baneh County, Kurdistan Province, Iran. At the 2006 census, its population was 45, in 7 families. The village is populated by Kurds.
