= Shilman =

Village in Kurdistan, Iran

Shilman شيلمان
- Village
- Location within Iran
- Coordinates: 35°51′12″N 46°01′07″E
- Country: Iran
- Province: Kurdistan
- County: Baneh
- Bakhsh: Nanur
- Rural District: Nanur

Population (2006)
  - Total: 80
- Time zone: UTC+3:30 (IRST)
  - Summer (DST): UTC+4:30 (IRDT)

Shilman (Persian: شيلمان, also Romanized as Shīlmān; also known as Shalmān) is a village in Nanur Rural District, Nanur District, Baneh County, Kurdistan Province, Iran. At the 2006 census, its population was 80, in 12 families. The village is populated by Kurds.
