= Bakhshabad =

Bakhshabad (Persian: بخش اباد) may refer to:

- Bakhshabad, Chaharmahal and Bakhtiari
- Bakhshabad, Semnan
- Bakhshabad, Razavi Khorasan
- Bakhshabad, South Khorasan
