= Shilan =

Shilan (Persian: شيلان) may refer to:

- Shilan, Gilan
- Shilan, Kurdistan
- Shilan, Baneh, Kurdistan Province
- Shilan Town (石栏镇), a town of Huayuan County, Hunan, China.
