= Sefid Kamareh =

Sefid Kamareh سفيدكمره
- Village
- Location within Iran
- Coordinates: 35°55′53″N 45°58′12″E
- Country: Iran
- Province: Kurdistan
- County: Baneh
- Bakhsh: Nanur
- Rural District: Buin

Population (2006)
  - Total: 143
- Time zone: UTC+3:30 (IRST)
  - Summer (DST): UTC+4:30 (IRDT)

Sefid Kamareh (Persian: سفيدكمره, also Romanized as Sefīd Kamareh; also known as Sefīd Kareh) is a village in Buin Rural District, Nanur District, Baneh County, Kurdistan Province, Iran. At the 2006 census, its population was 143, in 23 families. The village is populated by Kurds.
