= Bid, Razavi Khorasan =

Bid بيد
- Village
- Location within Iran
- Coordinates: 36°29′06″N 57°32′03″E
- Country: Iran
- Province: Razavi Khorasan
- County: Jowayin
- Bakhsh: Central
- Rural District: Pirakuh

Population (2006)
  - Total: 286
- Time zone: UTC+3:30 (IRST)
  - Summer (DST): UTC+4:30 (IRDT)

Bid (Persian: بيد, also Romanized as Bīd) is a village in Pirakuh Rural District, in the Central District of Jowayin County, Razavi Khorasan Province, Iran. At the 2006 census, its population was 286, in 129 families.
