= Havareh Khul =

Havareh Khul هواره خول
- Village
- Location within Iran
- Coordinates: 35°56′27″N 46°00′36″E
- Country: Iran
- Province: Kurdistan
- County: Baneh
- Bakhsh: Nanur
- Rural District: Buin

Population (2006)
  - Total: 160
- Time zone: UTC+3:30 (IRST)
  - Summer (DST): UTC+4:30 (IRDT)

Havareh Khul (Persian: هواره خول, also Romanized as Havāreh Khūl; also known as Havāreh Khowr and Havarikhūr) is a village in Buin Rural District, Nanur District, Baneh County, Kurdistan Province, Iran. At the 2006 census, its population was 160, in 29 families. The village is populated by Kurds.
