= Kalateh-ye Andadeh =

Village in Razavi Khorasan province, Iran

Kalateh-ye Andadeh Persian: كلاته انداده
- Village
- Location within Iran
- Coordinates: 36°45′13″N 57°13′49″E
- Country: Iran
- Province: Razavi Khorasan
- County: Joveyn
- District: Central
- Rural District: Bala Joveyn

Population (2016)
  - Total: 642
- Time zone: UTC+3:30 (IRST)

Kalateh-ye Andadeh (Persian: كلاته انداده) (Note: Also romanized as Kalāteh-ye Andādeh; also known as Mīānābād-e Joveyn) is a village in Bala Joveyn Rural District of the Central District in Joveyn County, Razavi Khorasan province, Iran.

== Demographics ==
=== Population ===
At the time of the 2006 National Census, the village's population was 706 in 172 households, when it was in the former Joveyn District of Sabzevar County. The following census in 2011 counted 675 people in 180 households, by which time the district had been separated from the county in the establishment of Joveyn County. The rural district was transferred to the new Central District. The 2016 census measured the population of the village as 642 people in 194 households.
