= Kivaleh =

Kivaleh كيوله
- Village
- Country: Iran
- Province: Kurdistan
- County: Baneh
- Bakhsh: Nanur
- Rural District: Buin

Population (2006)
  - Total: 152
- Time zone: UTC+3:30 (IRST)
  - Summer (DST): UTC+4:30 (IRDT)

Kivaleh (Persian: كيوله, also Romanized as Kīvaleh) is a village in Buin Rural District, Nanur District, Baneh County, Kurdistan Province, Iran. At the 2006 census, its population was 152, in 28 families. The village is populated by Kurds.
