= Mianabad, Joveyn =

Village in Razavi Khorasan province, Iran

Mianabad Persian: ميان اباد
- Village
- Location within Iran
- Coordinates: 36°30′16″N 57°35′48″E
- Country: Iran
- Province: Razavi Khorasan
- County: Joveyn
- District: Central
- Rural District: Pirakuh

Population (2016)
  - Total: 238
- Time zone: UTC+3:30 (IRST)

Mianabad (Persian: ميان اباد) (Note: Also romanized as Mīānābād) is a village in Pirakuh Rural District of the Central District in Joveyn County, Razavi Khorasan province, Iran.

== Demographics ==
=== Population ===
At the time of the 2006 National Census, the village's population was 101 in 37 households, when it was in the former Joveyn District of Sabzevar County. The following census in 2011 counted 235 people in 79 households, by which time the district had been separated from the county in the establishment of Joveyn County. The rural district was transferred to the new Central District. The 2016 census measured the population of the village as 238 people in 78 households.
