= Nanva =

Village in Razavi Khorasan province, Iran

Nanva Persian: نانوا
- Village
- Location within Iran
- Coordinates: 36°40′25″N 57°30′15″E
- Country: Iran
- Province: Razavi Khorasan
- County: Joveyn
- District: Atamalek
- Rural District: Hokmabad

Population (2016)
  - Total: 1,030
- Time zone: UTC+3:30 (IRST)

Nanva (Persian: نانوا) (Note: Also romanized as Nānvā; also known as Bakhshābād) is a village in Hokmabad Rural District of Atamalek District in Joveyn County, Razavi Khorasan province, Iran.

== Demographics ==
=== Population ===
At the time of the 2006 National Census, the village's population was 667 in 157 households, when it was in the former Joveyn District of Sabzevar County. The following census in 2011 counted 1,085 people in 292 households, by which time the district had been separated from the county in the establishment of Joveyn County. The rural district was transferred to the new Atamalek District. The 2016 census measured the population of the village as 1,030 people in 300 households.
