= Jazandar =

Jazandar (Persian: جازندر) may refer to:

- Jazandar, Firuzeh
- Jazandar, Jowayin
