= Kolah Dul =

Kolah Dul كلاه دول
- Village
- Location within Iran
- Coordinates: 35°51′44″N 45°52′26″E
- Country: Iran
- Province: Kurdistan
- County: Baneh
- Bakhsh: Nanur
- Rural District: Buin

Population (2006)
  - Total: 75
- Time zone: UTC+3:30 (IRST)
  - Summer (DST): UTC+4:30 (IRDT)

Kolah Dul (Persian: كلاه دول, also Romanized as Kolāh Dūl; also known as Kolāhvel) is a village in Buin Rural District, Nanur District, Baneh County, Kurdistan Province, Iran. At the 2006 census, its population was 75, in 15 families. The village is populated by Kurds.
