= Marqad =

Marqad مرقد
- Village
- Location within Iran
- Coordinates: 35°56′21″N 46°01′28″E
- Country: Iran
- Province: Kurdistan
- County: Baneh
- Bakhsh: Nanur
- Rural District: Buin

Population (2006)
  - Total: 57
- Time zone: UTC+3:30 (IRST)
  - Summer (DST): UTC+4:30 (IRDT)

Marqad (Persian: مرقد; also known as Marqad-e Sūrīn) is a village in Buin Rural District, Nanur District, Baneh County, Kurdistan Province, Iran. At the 2006 census, its population was 57, in 8 families. The village is populated by Kurds.
