= Kani Pari =

Kani Pari كاني پري
- Village
- Location within Iran
- Coordinates: 35°59′00″N 46°09′00″E
- Country: Iran
- Province: Kurdistan
- County: Baneh
- Bakhsh: Nanur
- Rural District: Buin

Population (2006)
  - Total: 59
- Time zone: UTC+3:30 (IRST)
  - Summer (DST): UTC+4:30 (IRDT)

Kani Pari (Persian: كاني پري, also Romanized as Kānī Parī) is a village in Buin Rural District, Nanur District, Baneh County, Kurdistan Province, Iran. At the 2006 census, its population was 59, in 9 families. The village is populated by Kurds.
