= Betty Batoul =

Belgian-Moroccan writer, human rights activist

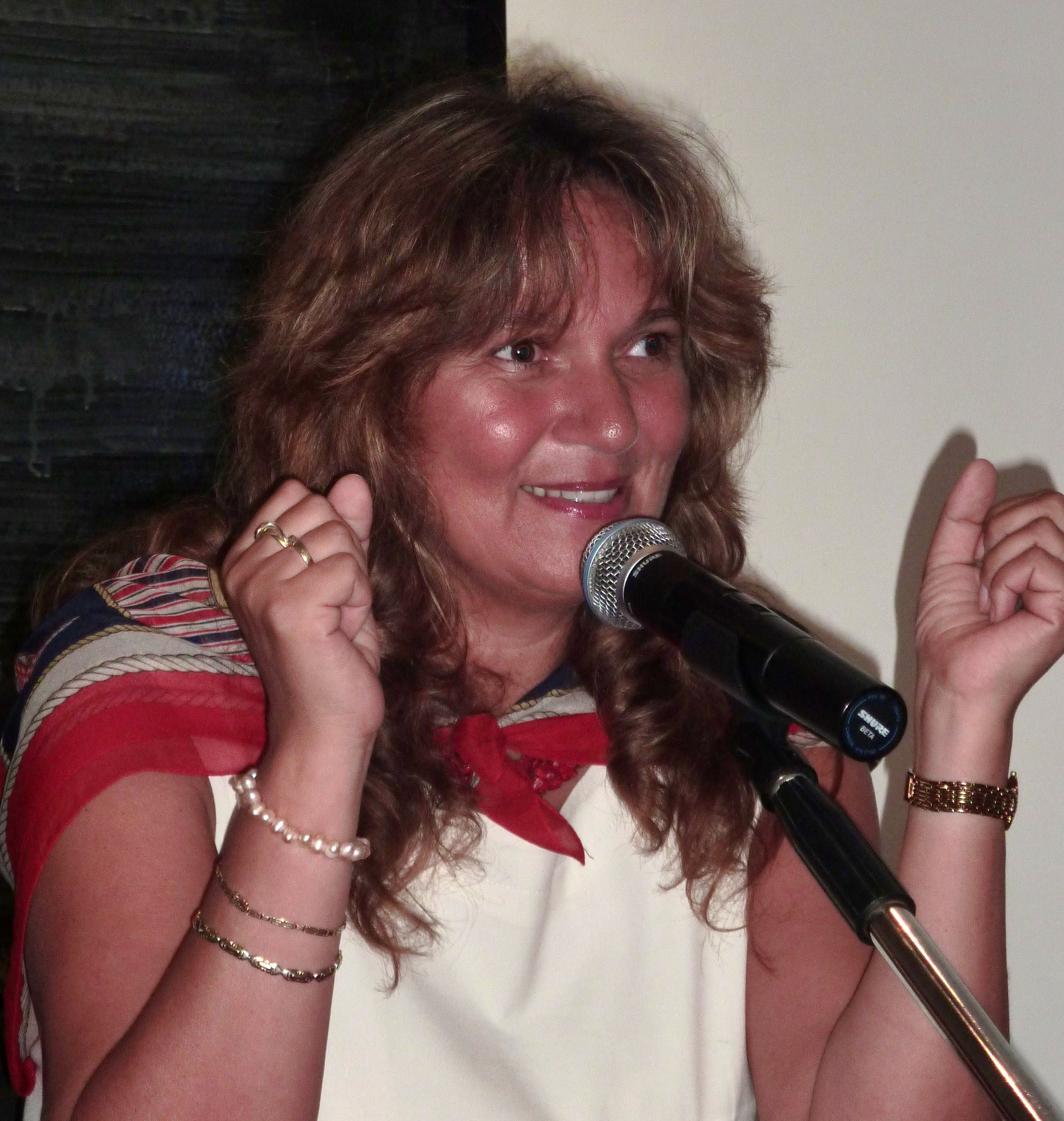
- Betty Batoul in a conference atla Villa des Arts, Casablanca, Morocco

Writer, Human Rights activist

Personal details
- Born: 16 October 1964 (age 61) Ixelles, Brussels-Capital, Belgium
- Education: Facultés Universitaires de la Paix Namur
- Profession: writer

Betty Batoul Ben el Hiouel, alias Betty Batoul (born October 16, 1964) is a Belgian–Moroccan writer of French language and a dynamic human rights activist in Belgium and Morocco, more specifically in the fight against violence against women and sexual child abuse. She was born in Ixelles, Belgium.

== Biography ==
Betty Batoul is the daughter of Jeanine Van der Schueren, Belgian born to a Walloon father (Brussels) and Kaddour Ben el Hiouel, a Moroccan from the Guercif region.

Betty Batoul's childhood took place between Belgium (Brussels, Waterloo, Charleroi, Namur, Dinant, Beauraing, etc.) and Morocco (Guercif Province, Oujda and El Jadida) where she continued her studies in both languages.

She was later faced with rejection due to racism and disability, but also to adult mistreatment. At 13, she opted for the name Betty tired of the mockery of children about her misspelled name (Betsoul).

Betty grew up with lots of scars which she could not get rid of, even in alcohol. She finished her humanities and continued at the FUNDP (University Faculties of Peace Namur) and studied economics (1984–1985). After a first dropout, she started studying law (1985–1986), but had to interrupt for family reasons. She then experienced a series of domestic violence for several years before going back at all levels.

In 1994, she married Pascal Laurent.They have four children, Julien, Louis, Pierre and Jean.

She now lives in the Jemeppe-sur-Sambre region.

== Professional career ==
After several professional experiences in the secretariat (Fromagerie de Maredsous) and the Computer Center and Bible [archive], banks (Crédit Général, Nagelmaeckers), automotive expertise (Bureau Legrand and Cetex), consultancy (Temafield), in August 1999 she joined the Alstom Transport group (Charleroi) in the signaling department as assistant to the Vice President of the Railways.

At the same time, she resumed her studies in the evening classes. After having successfully graduated in management information technology (Aumôniers du Travail, Charleroi, 2001–2004), she obtained a Special License in Taxation (University of Mons, 2009).

She was appointed to the position of Cost & Planning Manager in 2004 and worked on national and international railway in which the ERTMS (European Rail Traffic Management System) was offered.

In 2007, she fulfilled her first internal auditor mission in the different Alstom sites for the Impact project.

In 2008, she was appointed to the position of Bid manager and took charge of complete offers such as the TBL (Transmission balise-locomotive) market for SNCB (National Railway Company of Belgium) or the Charleroi Metro for TEC (Public transport). She also participated in international offers such as the high-speed line between Rabat and Casa for the ONCF, the rail link between the holy cities in Saudi Arabia or the maintenance contract for SBB (Swiss Federal Railways).

In 2010, she created the editions "Un coquelicot en Hiver" to publish and circulate her testimony but also other stories of hope and practical guides whose objective is to share experiences.

In 2014, she obtained a life coach diploma and started in the animation of workshops developing self-confidence.

In 2016, for her project management skills and volunteering experience, she engaged with the Belgian Red Cross to ensure the merging the two entities in the Namur region. This was a successful mission, during which she also obtained a First aid certificate.

In 2020, after having passed the Administrative Assistant exams, she was hired by the city of Wallonia Public Services.

== Activities ==
In 2014, together with the municipal authorities, she opened the first Salon du Livre et des Artistes (SLAR) (Book and Artists Fair) in Sambreville to honor a wide range of artists, including former victims who chose art to bounce back. A fair against a background of resilience that allows different artistic disciplines (writing, painting, crafts, photography, pottery ...) to meet and collaborate.

Betty Batoul was elected Woman of Peace of Belgium for her actions in favor of peace. She received the king's invitation for a ceremony at the Laeken palace on May 8, 2012. She was invited by the sovereigns on the occasion of International Women's Day as she was one of the 12 exceptional women nominated in 2014.

Since 2018, her association has offered professionals in the field (police officers, magistrates, front-line services ...) awareness-raising workshops on the reception of victims, always based on her experience. She regularly participates or organizes walks to support the fight against all forms of violence.
