= Genareh =

Village in Golestan province, Iran

Genareh Persian: گناره
- Village
- Location within Iran
- Coordinates: 36°53′12″N 54°40′04″E
- Country: Iran
- Province: Golestan
- County: Gorgan
- District: Baharan
- Rural District: Qoroq

Population (2016)
  - Total: 164
- Time zone: UTC+3:30 (IRST)

Genareh (Persian: گناره) (Note: Also romanized as Genāreh; also known as Genāreh-ye Malek) is a village in Qoroq Rural District of Baharan District in Gorgan County, Golestan province, Iran.

== Demographics ==
=== Population ===
At the time of the 2006 National Census, the village's population was 229 in 52 households. The following census in 2011 counted 186 people in 57 households. The 2016 census measured the population of the village as 164 people in 50 households.
