= Chenar Qeshlaq =

Village in Golestan province, Iran

Chenar Qeshlaq Persian: چنارقشلاق
- Village
- Location within Iran
- Coordinates: 36°56′32″N 54°38′42″E
- Country: Iran
- Province: Golestan
- County: Gorgan
- District: Baharan
- Rural District: Qoroq

Population (2016)
  - Total: 1,339
- Time zone: UTC+3:30 (IRST)

Chenar Qeshlaq (Persian: چنارقشلاق) (Note: Also romanized as Chenār Qeshlāq) is a village in Qoroq Rural District of Baharan District in Gorgan County, Golestan province, Iran.

== Demographics ==
=== Population ===
At the time of the 2006 National Census, the village's population was 1,356 in 315 households. The following census in 2011 counted 1,334 people in 360 households. The 2016 census measured the population of the village as 1,339 people in 391 households.
