= Mir Mahalleh, Golestan =

Village in Golestan province, Iran

Mir Mahalleh Persian: ميرمحله
- Village
- Location within Iran
- Coordinates: 36°54′27″N 54°36′29″E
- Country: Iran
- Province: Golestan
- County: Gorgan
- District: Baharan
- Rural District: Estarabad-e Shomali

Population (2016)
  - Total: 787
- Time zone: UTC+3:30 (IRST)

Mir Mahalleh (Persian: ميرمحله) (Note: Also romanized as Mīr Maḩalleh) is a village in Estarabad-e Shomali Rural District of Baharan District in Gorgan County, Golestan province, Iran.

== Demographics ==
=== Population ===
At the time of the 2006 National Census, the village's population was 1,071 in 288 households. The following census in 2011 counted 986 people in 302 households. The 2016 census measured the population of the village as 787 people in 257 households.
