= Alu Kalateh =

Village in Golestan province, Iran

Alu Kalateh Persian: الوكلاته
- Village
- Location within Iran
- Coordinates: 36°53′38″N 54°29′18″E
- Country: Iran
- Province: Golestan
- County: Gorgan
- District: Baharan
- Rural District: Estarabad-e Shomali

Population (2016)
  - Total: 2,572
- Time zone: UTC+3:30 (IRST)

Alu Kalateh (Persian: الوكلاته) (Note: Also romanized as Ālū Kalāteh) is a village in Estarabad-e Shomali Rural District of Baharan District in Gorgan County, Golestan province, Iran.

== Demographics ==
=== Population ===
At the time of the 2006 National Census, the village's population was 2,291 in 596 households. The following census in 2011 counted 2,442 people in 732 households. The 2016 census measured the population of the village as 2,572 people in 804 households. It was the most populous village in its rural district.
