= Chahar Chenar =

Village in Golestan province, Iran

Chahar Chenar Persian: چهارچنار
- Village
- Location within Iran
- Coordinates: 36°54′30″N 54°33′11″E
- Country: Iran
- Province: Golestan
- County: Gorgan
- District: Baharan
- Rural District: Estarabad-e Shomali

Population (2016)
  - Total: 1,055
- Time zone: UTC+3:30 (IRST)

Chahar Chenar (Persian: چهارچنار) (Note: Also romanized as Chahār Chenār) is a village in Estarabad-e Shomali Rural District of Baharan District in Gorgan County, Golestan province, Iran.

== Demographics ==
=== Population ===
At the time of the 2006 National Census, the village's population was 948 in 244 households. The following census in 2011 counted 1,043 people in 306 households. The 2016 census measured the population of the village as 1,055 people in 318 households.
