= Surin, Iran =

Village in Kurdistan province, Iran

Surin Persian: سورين
- Village
- Location within Iran Location within Iran Kurdistan
- Coordinates: 35°56′50″N 46°02′25″E
- Country: Iran
- Province: Kurdistan
- County: Baneh
- District: Nanur
- Rural District: Buin

Population (2016)
  - Total: 458
- Time zone: UTC+3:30 (IRST)

Surin (Persian: سورين) (Note: Also romanized as Sūrīn; also known as Suren) is a village in Buin Rural District of Nanur District in Baneh County, Kurdistan province, Iran.

== Demographics ==
=== Ethnicity ===
The village is populated by Kurds.

=== Population ===
At the time of the 2006 National Census, the village's population was 366 in 68 households. The following census in 2011 counted 422 people in 93 households. The 2016 census measured the population of the village as 458 people in 117 households, the most populous in its rural district.
