= Aliabad-e Kenar Shahr =

Village in Golestan province, Iran

Aliabad-e Kenar Shahr Persian: علی آباد كنارشهر
- Village
- Location within Iran
- Coordinates: 36°53′54″N 54°31′19″E
- Country: Iran
- Province: Golestan
- County: Gorgan
- District: Baharan
- Rural District: Estarabad-e Shomali

Population (2016)
  - Total: 1,163
- Time zone: UTC+3:30 (IRST)

Aliabad-e Kenar Shahr (Persian: علی آباد كنارشهر) (Note: Also romanized as ‘Alīābād-e Kenār Shahr) is a village in Estarabad-e Shomali Rural District of Baharan District in Gorgan County, Golestan province, Iran.

== Demographics ==
=== Population ===
At the time of the 2006 National Census, the village's population was 1,180 in 291 households. The following census in 2011 counted 1,084 people in 301 households. The 2016 census measured the population of the village as 1,163 people in 335 households.
