= Buin =

Buin may refer to:

- Buin, Chile
- Buin, Iran (disambiguation)
- Buin, Papua New Guinea on Bougainville Island
- Buin Rural LLG on Bougainville Island

== See also ==
- Bouin (disambiguation)
