= Shasheh =

Village in Kurdistan province, Iran

Shasheh Persian: ششه
- Village
- Location within Iran Location within Iran Kurdistan
- Coordinates: 35°52′40″N 46°00′50″E
- Country: Iran
- Province: Kurdistan
- County: Baneh
- District: Nanur
- Rural District: Nanur

Population (2016)
  - Total: 108
- Time zone: UTC+3:30 (IRST)

Shasheh (Persian: ششه) (Note: Also known as Sasheh and Shasha) is a village in Nanur Rural District of Nanur District in Baneh County, Kurdistan province, Iran.

== Demographics ==
=== Ethnicity ===
The village is populated by Kurds.

=== Population ===
At the time of the 2006 National Census, the village's population was 114 in 21 households. The following census in 2011 counted 97 people in 23 households. The 2016 census measured the population of the village as 108 people in 27 households.
