= Bolbol Tappeh =

Village in Golestan province, Iran

Bolbol Tappeh Persian: بلبل تپه
- Village
- Location within Iran
- Coordinates: 36°58′17″N 54°35′02″E
- Country: Iran
- Province: Golestan
- County: Gorgan
- District: Baharan
- Rural District: Qoroq

Population (2016)
  - Total: 177
- Time zone: UTC+3:30 (IRST)

Bolbol Tappeh (Persian: بلبل تپه) (Note: Also known as Būrbūr Tappeh) is a village in Qoroq Rural District of Baharan District in Gorgan County, Golestan province, Iran.

== Demographics ==
=== Population ===
At the time of the 2006 National Census, the village's population was 160 in 38 households. The following census in 2011 counted 183 people in 48 households. The 2016 census measured the population of the village as 177 people in 55 households.
