= Jafarabad, Golestan =

Village in Golestan province, Iran

Jafarabad Persian: جعفرآباد
- Village
- Location within Iran
- Coordinates: 36°50′25″N 54°41′15″E
- Country: Iran
- Province: Golestan
- County: Gorgan
- District: Baharan
- Rural District: Qoroq

Population (2016)
  - Total: 763
- Time zone: UTC+3:30 (IRST)

Jafarabad (Persian: جعفرآباد) (Note: Also romanized as Ja‘farābād; also known as Ja‘farābād-e Malek) is a village in Qoroq Rural District of Baharan District in Gorgan County, Golestan province, Iran.

== Demographics ==
=== Population ===
At the time of the 2006 National Census, the village's population was 686 in 179 households. The following census in 2011 counted 770 people in 235 households. The 2016 census measured the population of the village as 763 people in 255 households.
