= Teymurabad, Golestan =

Village in Golestan province, Iran

Teymurabad Persian: تيموراباد
- Village
- Location within Iran
- Coordinates: 36°55′18″N 54°41′45″E
- Country: Iran
- Province: Golestan
- County: Gorgan
- District: Baharan
- Rural District: Qoroq

Population (2016)
  - Total: 355
- Time zone: UTC+3:30 (IRST)

Teymurabad (Persian: تيموراباد) (Note: Also romanized as Teymūrābād) is a village in Qoroq Rural District of Baharan District in Gorgan County, Golestan province, Iran.

== Demographics ==
=== Population ===
At the time of the 2006 National Census, the village's population was 300 in 71 households. The following census in 2011 counted 318 people in 87 households. The 2016 census measured the population of the village as 355 people in 98 households.
