= Darvishabad, Golestan =

Village in Golestan province, Iran

Darvishabad Persian: درويش آباد
- Village
- Location within Iran
- Coordinates: 36°55′34″N 54°35′51″E
- Country: Iran
- Province: Golestan
- County: Gorgan
- District: Baharan
- Rural District: Estarabad-e Shomali

Population (2016)
  - Total: 413
- Time zone: UTC+3:30 (IRST)

Darvishabad (Persian: درويش آباد) (Note: Also romanized as Darvīshābād) is a village in Estarabad-e Shomali Rural District of Baharan District in Gorgan County, Golestan province, Iran.

== Demographics ==
=== Population ===
At the time of the 2006 National Census, the village's population was 380 in 99 households. The following census in 2011 counted 428 people in 125 households. The 2016 census measured the population of the village as 413 people in 127 households.
