= Atra Chal =

Village in Golestan province, Iran

Atra Chal Persian: اتراچال
- Village
- Location within Iran
- Coordinates: 36°54′25″N 54°28′16″E
- Country: Iran
- Province: Golestan
- County: Gorgan
- District: Baharan
- Rural District: Estarabad-e Shomali

Population (2016)
  - Total: 1,555
- Time zone: UTC+3:30 (IRST)

Atra Chal (Persian: اتراچال) (Note: Also romanized as Atrā Chāl) is a village in Estarabad-e Shomali Rural District of Baharan District in Gorgan County, Golestan province, Iran.

== Demographics ==
=== Population ===
At the time of the 2006 National Census, the village's population was 1,245 in 311 households. The following census in 2011 counted 1,377 people in 390 households. The 2016 census measured the population of the village as 1,555 people in 469 households.
