= Chuplani =

Village in Golestan province, Iran

Chuplani Persian: چوپلاني
- Village
- Location within Iran
- Coordinates: 36°53′13″N 54°36′11″E
- Country: Iran
- Province: Golestan
- County: Gorgan
- District: Baharan
- Rural District: Estarabad-e Shomali

Population (2016)
  - Total: 304
- Time zone: UTC+3:30 (IRST)

Chuplani (Persian: چوپلاني) (Note: Also romanized as Chūplānī) is a village in Estarabad-e Shomali Rural District of Baharan District in Gorgan County, Golestan province, Iran.

== Demographics ==
=== Population ===
At the time of the 2006 National Census, the village's population was 300 in 67 households. The following census in 2011 counted 286 people in 77 households. The 2016 census measured the population of the village as 304 people in 88 households.
