= Marzan Kalateh =

Village in Golestan province, Iran

Marzan Kalateh Persian: مرزن كلاته
- Village
- Location within Iran
- Coordinates: 36°52′33″N 54°35′50″E
- Country: Iran
- Province: Golestan
- County: Gorgan
- District: Baharan
- Rural District: Estarabad-e Shomali

Population (2016)
  - Total: 1,384
- Time zone: UTC+3:30 (IRST)

Marzan Kalateh (Persian: مرزن كلاته) (Note: Also romanized as Marzan Kalāteh) is a village in Estarabad-e Shomali Rural District of Baharan District in Gorgan County, Golestan province, Iran.

== Demographics ==
=== Population ===
At the time of the 2006 National Census, the village's population was 1,796 in 487 households. The following census in 2011 counted 1,626 people in 482 households. The 2016 census measured the population of the village as 1,384 people in 458 households.
