= Qoliabad, Kurdistan =

Qoliabad قلي آباد
- Village
- Location within Iran
- Coordinates: 35°52′16″N 45°57′23″E
- Country: Iran
- Province: Kurdistan
- County: Baneh
- Bakhsh: Nanur
- Rural District: Nanur
- Elevation: 1,507 m (4,944 ft)

Population (2006)
  - Total: 95
- Time zone: UTC+3:30 (IRST)
  - Summer (DST): UTC+4:30 (IRDT)

Qoliabad (Persian: قلي آباد, also Romanized as Qolīābād) is a village in Nanur Rural District, Nanur District, Baneh County, Kurdistan Province, Iran. At the 2006 census, its population was 95, in 16 families. The village is populated by Kurds.
