= Turang Tappeh =

Village in Golestan province, Iran

Turang Tappeh Persian: تورنگ تپه
- Village
- Location within Iran
- Coordinates: 36°56′13″N 54°35′18″E
- Country: Iran
- Province: Golestan
- County: Gorgan
- District: Baharan
- Rural District: Estarabad-e Shomali

Population (2016)
  - Total: 569
- Time zone: UTC+3:30 (IRST)

Turang Tappeh (Persian: تورنگ تپه) (Note: Also romanized as Tūrang Tappeh) is a village in Estarabad-e Shomali Rural District of Baharan District in Gorgan County, Golestan province, Iran. The archaeological site of Tureng Tepe is nearby.

== Demographics ==
=== Population ===
At the time of the 2006 National Census, the village's population was 661 in 171 households. The following census in 2011 counted 631 people in 187 households. The 2016 census measured the population of the village as 569 people in 179 households.
