= Bian Darreh =

Village in Kurdistan province, Iran

Bian Darreh Persian: بياندره
- Village
- Location within Iran Location within Iran Kurdistan
- Coordinates: 35°57′14″N 46°09′21″E
- Country: Iran
- Province: Kurdistan
- County: Baneh
- District: Nanur
- Rural District: Buin

Population (2016)
  - Total: 433
- Time zone: UTC+3:30 (IRST)

Bian Darreh (Persian: بياندره) (Note: Also romanized as Beyān Darreh and Bīān Darreh; also known as Bayān Darreh) is a village in Buin Rural District of Nanur District in Baneh County, Kurdistan province, Iran.

== Demographics ==
=== Ethnicity ===
The village is populated by Kurds.

=== Population ===
At the time of the 2006 National Census, the village's population was 473 in 86 households. The following census in 2011 counted 408 people in 90 households. The 2016 census measured the population of the village as 433 people in 118 households.
