= Kani Shilan =

Kani Shilan كاني شيلان
- Village
- Location within Iran
- Coordinates: 35°51′44″N 45°55′09″E
- Country: Iran
- Province: Kurdistan
- County: Baneh
- Bakhsh: Nanur
- Rural District: Buin

Population (2018)
  - Total: 44
- Time zone: UTC+3:30 (IRST)
  - Summer (DST): UTC+4:30 (IRDT)

Kani Shilan (Persian: كاني شيلان, also Romanized as Kānī Shīlān; also known as Shīlān) is a village in Buin Rural District, Nanur District, Baneh County, Kurdistan Province, Iran. At the 2006 census, its population was 79, in 13 families. The village is populated by Kurds.
