= Khuriabad, Kurdistan =

Village in Kurdistan province, Iran

Khuriabad Persian: خوري آباد
- Village
- Location within Iran Location within Iran Kurdistan
- Coordinates: 35°54′13″N 45°59′13″E
- Country: Iran
- Province: Kurdistan
- County: Baneh
- District: Nanur
- Rural District: Nanur

Population (2016)
  - Total: 580
- Time zone: UTC+3:30 (IRST)

Khuriabad (Persian: خوري آباد) (Note: Also romanized as Khūrīābād; also known as Khuriāwa) is a village in Nanur Rural District of Nanur District in Baneh County, Kurdistan province, Iran.

== Demographics ==
=== Ethnicity ===
The village is populated by Kurds.

=== Population ===
At the time of the 2006 National Census, the village's population was 536 in 98 households. The following census in 2011 counted 591 people in 134 households. The 2016 census measured the population of the village as 580 people in 163 households.
