= Kamalabad, Gorgan =

Village in Golestan province, Iran

Kamalabad Persian: كمال اباد
- Village
- Location within Iran
- Coordinates: 36°53′43″N 54°30′43″E
- Country: Iran
- Province: Golestan
- County: Gorgan
- District: Baharan
- Rural District: Estarabad-e Shomali

Population (2016)
  - Total: 192
- Time zone: UTC+3:30 (IRST)

Kamalabad (Persian: كمال اباد) (Note: Also romanized as Kamālābād) is a village in Estarabad-e Shomali Rural District of Baharan District in Gorgan County, Golestan province, Iran.

== Demographics ==
=== Population ===
At the time of the 2006 National Census, the village's population was 247 in 69 households. The following census in 2011 counted 240 people in 69 households. The 2016 census measured the population of the village as 192 people in 71 households.
