= Chichuran =

Village in Kurdistan province, Iran

Chichuran Persian: چي چوران
- Village
- Location within Iran Location within Iran Kurdistan
- Coordinates: 35°57′53″N 45°56′50″E
- Country: Iran
- Province: Kurdistan
- County: Baneh
- District: Nanur
- Rural District: Buin

Population (2016)
  - Total: 339
- Time zone: UTC+3:30 (IRST)

Chichuran (Persian: چي چوران) (Note: Also romanized as Chīchūrān) is a village in Buin Rural District of Nanur District in Baneh County, Kurdistan province, Iran.

== Demographics ==
=== Ethnicity ===
The village is populated by Kurds.

=== Population ===
At the time of the 2006 National Census, the village's population was 366 in 69 households. The following census in 2011 counted 339 people in 74 households. The 2016 census measured the population of the village as 339 people in 78 households.
