= Valiabad, Baneh =

Village in Kurdistan province, Iran

Valiabad Persian: ولي آباد
- Village
- Location within Iran Location within Iran Kurdistan
- Coordinates: 35°54′15″N 45°55′33″E
- Country: Iran
- Province: Kurdistan
- County: Baneh
- District: Nanur
- Rural District: Buin

Population (2016)
  - Total: 241
- Time zone: UTC+3:30 (IRST)

Valiabad (Persian: ولی‌آباد) (Note: Also romanized as Valīābād) is a village in Buin Rural District of Nanur District in Baneh County, Kurdistan province, Iran.

== Demographics ==
=== Ethnicity ===
The village is populated by Kurds.

=== Population ===
At the time of the 2006 National Census, the village's population was 248 in 49 households. The following census in 2011 counted 239 people in 51 households. The 2016 census measured the population of the village as 241 people in 73 households.
