= Nanur =

Village in Kurdistan province, Iran

Nanur Persian: ننور
- Village
- Location within Iran Location within Iran Kurdistan
- Coordinates: 35°51′53″N 46°00′50″E
- Country: Iran
- Province: Kurdistan
- County: Baneh
- District: Nanur
- Rural District: Nanur

Population (2016)
  - Total: 679
- Time zone: UTC+3:30 (IRST)

Nanur (Persian: ننور) (Note: Also romanized as Nanūr; also known as Nanor and Pahlavī Dezh) is a village in, and the capital of, Nanur Rural District in Nanur District of Baneh County, Kurdistan province, Iran.

== Demographics ==
=== Ethnicity ===
The village is populated by Kurds.

=== Population ===
At the time of the 2006 National Census, the village's population was 530 in 88 households. The following census in 2011 counted 599 people in 141 households. The 2016 census measured the population of the village as 679 people in 178 households.
