= Shamsabad, Golestan =

Village in Golestan province, Iran

Shamsabad Persian: شمس آباد
- Village
- Location within Iran
- Coordinates: 36°54′45″N 54°35′38″E
- Country: Iran
- Province: Golestan
- County: Gorgan
- District: Baharan
- Rural District: Estarabad-e Shomali

Population (2016)
  - Total: 393
- Time zone: UTC+3:30 (IRST)

Shamsabad (Persian: شمس آباد) (Note: Also romanized as Shamsābād) is a village in Estarabad-e Shomali Rural District of Baharan District in Gorgan County, Golestan province, Iran.

== Demographics ==
=== Population ===
At the time of the 2006 National Census, the village's population was 567 in 141 households. The following census in 2011 counted 483 people in 152 households. The 2016 census measured the population of the village as 393 people in 130 households.
