= Rostam Kalateh-ye Sadat =

Village in Golestan province, Iran

Rostam Kalateh-ye Sadat Persian: رستم كلاته سادات
- Village
- Location within Iran
- Coordinates: 36°52′41″N 54°29′55″E
- Country: Iran
- Province: Golestan
- County: Gorgan
- District: Baharan
- Rural District: Estarabad-e Shomali

Population (2016)
  - Total: 791
- Time zone: UTC+3:30 (IRST)

Rostam Kalateh-ye Sadat (Persian: رستم كلاته سادات) (Note: Also romanized as Rostam Kalāteh-ye Sādāt; also known as Rostam Kalāteh) is a village in Estarabad-e Shomali Rural District of Baharan District in Gorgan County, Golestan province, Iran.

== Demographics ==
=== Population ===
At the time of the 2006 National Census, the village's population was 819 in 200 households. The following census in 2011 counted 858 people in 235 households. The 2016 census measured the population of the village as 791 people in 240 households.
