= Kileh-ye Abbasabad =

Village in Kurdistan province, Iran

Kileh-ye Abbasabad Persian: كيله عباس آباد
- Village
- Location within Iran Location within Iran Kurdistan
- Coordinates: 35°52′42″N 45°58′59″E
- Country: Iran
- Province: Kurdistan
- County: Baneh
- District: Nanur
- Rural District: Nanur

Population (2016)
  - Total: 1,122
- Time zone: UTC+3:30 (IRST)

Kileh-ye Abbasabad (Persian: كيله عباس آباد) (Note: Also romanized as Kīleh-ye ‘Abbāsābād; also known as ‘Abbāsābād and Keleh) is a village in Nanur Rural District of Nanur District in Baneh County, Kurdistan province, Iran.

== Demographics ==
=== Ethnicity ===
The village is populated by Kurds.

=== Population ===
At the time of the 2006 National Census, the village's population was 810 in 154 households. The following census in 2011 counted 1,106 people in 242 households. The 2016 census measured the population of the village as 1,122 people in 289 households, the most populous in its rural district.
