= Masumabad, Gorgan =

Village in Golestan province, Iran

Masumabad Persian: معصوم آباد
- Village
- Location within Iran
- Coordinates: 36°54′01″N 54°32′32″E
- Country: Iran
- Province: Golestan
- County: Gorgan
- District: Baharan
- Rural District: Estarabad-e Shomali

Population (2016)
  - Total: 831
- Time zone: UTC+3:30 (IRST)

Masumabad (Persian: معصوم آباد) (Note: Also romanized as Ma‘şūmābād) is a village in Estarabad-e Shomali Rural District of Baharan District in Gorgan County, Golestan province, Iran.

== Demographics ==
=== Population ===
At the time of the 2006 National Census, the village's population was 997 in 273 households. The following census in 2011 counted 944 people in 298 households. The 2016 census measured the population of the village as 831 people in 278 households.
