= Soltanabad, Golestan =

Village in Golestan province, Iran

Soltanabad Persian: سلطان آباد
- Village
- Location within Iran
- Coordinates: 36°55′10″N 54°29′57″E
- Country: Iran
- Province: Golestan
- County: Gorgan
- District: Baharan
- Rural District: Estarabad-e Shomali

Population (2016)
  - Total: 1,263
- Time zone: UTC+3:30 (IRST)

Soltanabad (Persian: سلطان آباد) (Note: Also romanized as Solţānābād) is a village in Estarabad-e Shomali Rural District of Baharan District in Gorgan County, Golestan province, Iran.

== Demographics ==
=== Population ===
At the time of the 2006 National Census, the village's population was 1,368 in 323 households. The following census in 2011 counted 1,279 people in 374 households. The 2016 census measured the population of the village as 1,263 people in 385 households.
