= Fujerd =

Fujerd and Fojird and Fowjerd (Persian: فوجرد) may refer to:

- Fujerd, Golestan
- Fujerd, Qom
