= Jahan Tigh =

Jahan Tigh or Jahantigh (Persian: جهانتيغ) may refer to:

- Jahan Tigh, Golestan
- Jahan Tigh, Hirmand, Sistan and Baluchestan Province
