= Now Deh-e Sharif =

Village in Golestan province, Iran

Now Deh-e Sharif Persian: نوده شريف
- Village
- Location within Iran
- Coordinates: 36°56′18″N 54°34′09″E
- Country: Iran
- Province: Golestan
- County: Gorgan
- District: Baharan
- Rural District: Estarabad-e Shomali

Population (2016)
  - Total: 607
- Time zone: UTC+3:30 (IRST)

Now Deh-e Sharif (Persian: نوده شريف) (Note: Also romanized as Now Deh-e Sharīf; also known as Now Deh-e Ḩājjī Sharīf) is a village in Estarabad-e Shomali Rural District of Baharan District in Gorgan County, Golestan province, Iran.

== Demographics ==
=== Population ===
At the time of the 2006 National Census, the village's population was 632 in 149 households. The following census in 2011 counted 610 people in 161 households. The 2016 census measured the population of the village as 607 people in 183 households.
