= Hoseynabad-e Malek =

Village in Golestan province, Iran

Hoseynabad-e Malek Persian: حسين ابادملك
- Village
- Location within Iran
- Coordinates: 36°55′00″N 54°38′14″E
- Country: Iran
- Province: Golestan
- County: Gorgan
- District: Baharan
- Rural District: Qoroq

Population (2016)
  - Total: 970
- Time zone: UTC+3:30 (IRST)

Hoseynabad-e Malek (Persian: حسين ابادملك){[efn|Also romanized as Ḩoseynābād-e Malek is a village in Qoroq Rural District of Baharan District in Gorgan County, Golestan province, Iran.

== Demographics ==
=== Population ===
At the time of the 2006 National Census, the village's population was 1,171 in 296 households. The following census in 2011 counted 1,149 people in 351 households. The 2016 census measured the population of the village as 970 people in 328 households.
