= Guzan-e Fars =

Village in Golestan province, Iran

Guzan-e Fars Persian: گوزن فارس
- Village
- Location within Iran
- Coordinates: 36°55′51″N 54°37′56″E
- Country: Iran
- Province: Golestan
- County: Gorgan
- District: Baharan
- Rural District: Qoroq

Population (2016)
  - Total: 1,054
- Time zone: UTC+3:30 (IRST)

Guzan-e Fars (Persian: گوزن فارس) (Note: Also romanized as Gūzan-e Fārs; also known as Kūzan) is a village in Qoroq Rural District of Baharan District in Gorgan County, Golestan province, Iran.

== Demographics ==
=== Population ===
At the time of the 2006 National Census, the village's population was 1,178 in 310 households. The following census in 2011 counted 1,194 people in 356 households. The 2016 census measured the population of the village as 1,054 people in 342 households.
