= Jahanabad-e Sofla, Golestan =

Village in Golestan province, Iran

Jahanabad-e Sofla Persian: جهان ابادسفلي
- Village
- Location within Iran
- Coordinates: 36°57′27″N 54°35′35″E
- Country: Iran
- Province: Golestan
- County: Gorgan
- District: Baharan
- Rural District: Qoroq

Population (2016)
  - Total: 1,366
- Time zone: UTC+3:30 (IRST)

Jahanabad-e Sofla (Persian: جهان ابادسفلي) (Note: Also romanized as Jahānābād-e Soflá; also known as Jahānābād-e Pā’īn) is a village in Qoroq Rural District of Baharan District in Gorgan County, Golestan province, Iran.

== Demographics ==
=== Population ===
At the time of the 2006 National Census, the village's population was 1,183 in 288 households. The following census in 2011 counted 1,264 people in 349 households. The 2016 census measured the population of the village as 1,366 people in 405 households.
