= Gavizleh =

Village in Kurdistan province, Iran

Gavizleh Persian: گويزله
- Village
- Location within Iran Location within Iran Kurdistan
- Coordinates: 36°01′28″N 45°46′30″E
- Country: Iran
- Province: Kurdistan
- County: Baneh
- District: Nanur
- Rural District: Buin

Population (2016)
  - Total: 258
- Time zone: UTC+3:30 (IRST)

Gavizleh (Persian: گويزله) (Note: Also romanized as Gavīzleh) is a village in Buin Rural District of Nanur District in Baneh County, Kurdistan province, Iran.

== Demographics ==
=== Ethnicity ===
The village is populated by Kurds.

=== Population ===
At the time of the 2006 National Census, the village's population was 237 in 42 households. The following census in 2011 counted 230 people in 51 households. The 2016 census measured the population of the village as 258 people in 78 households.
