= Qul Estar =

Village in Kurdistan province, Iran

Qul Estar Persian: قول استر
- Village
- Location within Iran Location within Iran Kurdistan
- Coordinates: 35°54′41″N 46°01′12″E
- Country: Iran
- Province: Kurdistan
- County: Baneh
- District: Nanur
- Rural District: Nanur

Population (2016)
  - Total: 302
- Time zone: UTC+3:30 (IRST)

Qul Estar (Persian: قول استر) (Note: Also romanized as Qūl Estar and Qūlaster; also known as Kulastar, Qolestar, Qolīstar, and Qūl Estīr) is a village in Nanur Rural District of Nanur District in Baneh County, Kurdistan province, Iran.

== Demographics ==
=== Ethnicity ===
The village is populated by Kurds.

=== Population ===
At the time of the 2006 National Census, the village's population was 283 in 46 households. The following census in 2011 counted 278 people in 59 households. The 2016 census measured the population of the village as 302 people in 76 households.
