= Bouin =

Bouin may refer to:

== Places in France ==
- Bouin, Deux-Sèvres, in the Deux-Sèvres department
- Bouin, Vendée, in the Vendée department
  - Isle of Bouin, a former island in the Vendée department
- Bouin-Plumoison, in the Pas-de-Calais department
- Neuvy-Bouin, in the Deux-Sèvres department
- Villiers-au-Bouin, in the Indre-et-Loire department

== Other uses ==
- Bouin solution, a type of fixative used in histology
- Jean Bouin (1888–1914), French Olympic runner
- Sébastien Bouin, French rock climber
- Stade Jean-Bouin (disambiguation)

== See also ==
- Buin (disambiguation)
