= Hangeh-ye Zhal =

Village in Kurdistan province, Iran

Hangeh-ye Zhal Persian: هنگه ژال
- Village
- Location within Iran Location within Iran Kurdistan
- Coordinates: 35°50′47″N 45°59′36″E
- Country: Iran
- Province: Kurdistan
- County: Baneh
- District: Nanur
- Rural District: Nanur

Population (2016)
  - Total: 162
- Time zone: UTC+3:30 (IRST)

Hangeh-ye Zhal (Persian: هنگه ژال) (Note: Also romanized as Hangeh-ye Zhāl; also known as Hang-e Zhāl, Hank Zāl, and Hengzhāl) is a village in Nanur Rural District of Nanur District in Baneh County, Kurdistan province, Iran.

== Demographics ==
=== Ethnicity ===
The village is populated by the Kurds.

=== Population ===
At the time of the 2006 National Census, the village's population was 202 in 33 households. The following census in 2011 counted 209 people in 43 households. The 2016 census measured the population of the village as 162 people in 45 households.
