= Baluchabad, Gorgan =

Village in Golestan province, Iran

Baluchabad Persian: بلوچ آباد
- Village
- Location within Iran
- Coordinates: 36°51′59″N 54°40′29″E
- Country: Iran
- Province: Golestan
- County: Gorgan
- District: Baharan
- Rural District: Qoroq

Population (2016)
  - Total: 108
- Time zone: UTC+3:30 (IRST)

Baluchabad (Persian: بلوچ آباد) (Note: Also romanized as Balūchābād; also known as Naẓarābād) is a village in Qoroq Rural District of Baharan District in Gorgan County, Golestan province, Iran.

== Demographics ==
=== Population ===
At the time of the 2006 National Census, the village's population was 105 in 24 households. The following census in 2011 counted 109 people in 29 households. The 2016 census measured the population of the village as 108 people in 31 households.
