= Karimabad, Baneh =

Village in Kurdistan province, Iran

Karimabad Persian: كريم آباد
- Village
- Location within Iran Location within Iran Kurdistan
- Coordinates: 35°57′36″N 45°54′56″E
- Country: Iran
- Province: Kurdistan
- County: Baneh
- District: Nanur
- Rural District: Buin

Population (2016)
  - Total: 295
- Time zone: UTC+3:30 (IRST)

Karimabad (Persian: كريم آباد) (Note: Also romanized as Karīmābād) is a village in Buin Rural District of Nanur District in Baneh County, Kurdistan province, Iran.

== Demographics ==
=== Ethnicity ===
The village is populated by Kurds.

=== Population ===
At the time of the 2006 National Census, the village's population was 195 in 31 households. The following census in 2011 counted 263 people in 62 households. The 2016 census measured the population of the village as 295 people in 76 households.
