= Hokmabad =

City in Razavi Khorasan province, Iran

Hokmabad Persian: حكم اباد
- City
- Location within Iran
- Coordinates: 36°37′47″N 57°35′55″E
- Country: Iran
- Province: Razavi Khorasan
- County: Joveyn
- District: Atamalek
- Established as a city: 2018

Population (2016)
  - Total: 3,824
- Time zone: UTC+3:30 (IRST)

Hokmabad (Persian: حكم اباد) (Note: Also romanized as Ḩokmābād; also known as Hukmābād) is a city in, and the capital of, Atamalek District in Joveyn County, Razavi Khorasan province, Iran. It also serves as the administrative center for Hokmabad Rural District.

== Demographics ==
=== Population ===
At the time of the 2006 National Census, Hokmabad's population was 3,419 in 919 households, when it was a village in Hokmabad Rural District of the former Joveyn District in Sabzevar County. The following census in 2011 counted 3,695 people in 1,090 households, by which time the district had been separated from the county in the establishment of Joveyn County. The rural district was transferred to the new Atamalek District. The 2016 census measured the population of the village as 3,824 people in 1,143 households, the most populous in its rural district.

The village of Hokmabad was converted to a city in 2018.
