= Zarrin Rural District (Joveyn County) =

Rural district in Razavi Khorasan province, Iran

Zarrin Rural District Persian: دهستان زرين
- Rural District
- Location within Iran
- Coordinates: 36°36′N 57°45′E
- Country: Iran
- Province: Razavi Khorasan
- County: Joveyn
- District: Atamalek
- Established: 2007
- Capital: Bodaghabad

Population (2016)
  - Total: 4,570
- Time zone: UTC+3:30 (IRST)

Zarrin Rural District (Persian: دهستان زرين) is in Atamalek District of Joveyn County, Razavi Khorasan province, Iran. Its capital is the village of Bodaghabad.

== History ==
In 2007, Joveyn District was separated from Sabzevar County in the establishment of Joveyn County, and Zarrin Rural District was created in the new Atamalek District.

== Demographics ==
=== Population ===
At the time of the 2011 census, the rural district's population was 4,186 inhabitants in 1,248 households. The 2016 census measured the population of the rural district as 4,570 in 1,437 households. The most populous of its 12 villages was Kalateh-ye Arab, with 1,449 people.

=== Other villages in the rural district ===
- Ahmadabad
- Ebrahimabad-e Bala Joveyn
- Hoseynabad-e Mirza Momen
- Karimabad
- Rahmatabad
