= Now Deh-e Malek =

Village in Golestan province, Iran

Now Deh-e Malek Persian: نوده ملك
- Village
- Location within Iran
- Coordinates: 36°52′59″N 54°39′08″E
- Country: Iran
- Province: Golestan
- County: Gorgan
- District: Baharan
- Rural District: Qoroq

Population (2016)
  - Total: 3,026
- Time zone: UTC+3:30 (IRST)

Now Deh-e Malek (Persian: نوده ملك) is a village in, and the capital of, Qoroq Rural District in Baharan District of Gorgan County, Golestan province, Iran.

== Demographics ==
=== Population ===
At the time of the 2006 National Census, the village's population was 3,113 in 804 households. The following census in 2011 counted 3,117 people in 950 households. The 2016 census measured the population of the village as 3,026 people in 976 households.
