= Oshtorabad =

Village in Kurdistan province, Iran

Oshtorabad Persian: اشتر آباد
- Village
- Location within Iran Location within Iran Kurdistan
- Coordinates: 35°50′54″N 45°54′29″E
- Country: Iran
- Province: Kurdistan
- County: Baneh
- District: Nanur
- Rural District: Nanur

Population (2016)
  - Total: 185
- Time zone: UTC+3:30 (IRST)

Oshtorabad (Persian: اشتر آباد) (Note: Also romanized as Oshtorābād) is a village in Nanur Rural District of Nanur District in Baneh County, Kurdistan province, Iran.

== Demographics ==
=== Ethnicity ===
The village is populated by Kurds.

=== Population ===
At the time of the 2006 National Census, the village's population was 112 in 23 households. The following census in 2011 counted 134 people in 28 households. The 2016 census measured the population of the village as 185 people in 47 households.
