= Toqor Tappeh =

Village in Golestan province, Iran

Toqor Tappeh Persian: تقرتپه
- Village
- Location within Iran
- Coordinates: 36°51′38″N 54°38′50″E
- Country: Iran
- Province: Golestan
- County: Gorgan
- District: Baharan
- Rural District: Qoroq

Population (2016)
  - Total: 1,009
- Time zone: UTC+3:30 (IRST)

Toqor Tappeh (Persian: تقرتپه) is a village in Qoroq Rural District of Baharan District in Gorgan County, Golestan province, Iran.

== Demographics ==
=== Population ===
At the time of the 2006 National Census, the village's population was 989 in 243 households. The following census in 2011 counted 1,026 people in 295 households. The 2016 census measured the population of the village as 1,009 people in 300 households.
