= Barvish Kani, Nanur =

Village in Kurdistan province, Iran

Barvish Kani Persian: برويشكاني
- Village
- Location within Iran Location within Iran Kurdistan
- Coordinates: 35°52′20″N 46°02′16″E
- Country: Iran
- Province: Kurdistan
- County: Baneh
- District: Nanur
- Rural District: Nanur

Population (2016)
  - Total: 84
- Time zone: UTC+3:30 (IRST)

Barvish Kani (Persian: برويشكاني) (Note: Also romanized as Barvīsh Kānī; also known as Baresh Kānī, Barvishkani Pahlavi Dezh, Berūshkānī, Berūyashkānī, Birvesh Kāni, and Dirvesh Kani) is a village in Nanur Rural District of Nanur District in Baneh County, Kurdistan province, Iran.

== Demographics ==
=== Ethnicity ===
The village is populated by Kurds.

=== Population ===
At the time of the 2006 National Census, the village's population was 168 in 23 households. The following census in 2011 counted 130 people in 20 households. The 2016 census measured the population of the village as 84 people in 24 households.
