= Valeshabad =

Village in Golestan province, Iran

Valeshabad Persian: والش اباد
- Village
- Location within Iran
- Coordinates: 36°51′46″N 54°37′36″E
- Country: Iran
- Province: Golestan
- County: Gorgan
- District: Baharan
- Rural District: Qoroq

Population (2016)
  - Total: 1,199
- Time zone: UTC+3:30 (IRST)

Valeshabad (Persian: والش اباد) (Note: Also romanized as Vāleshābād) is a village in Qoroq Rural District of Baharan District in Gorgan County, Golestan province, Iran.

== Demographics ==
=== Population ===
At the time of the 2006 National Census, the village's population was 1,254 in 314 households. The following census in 2011 counted 1,253 people in 365 households. The 2016 census measured the population of the village as 1,199 people in 399 households.
