= Kamasi =

Village in Golestan province, Iran

Kamasi Persian: كماسي
- Village
- Location within Iran
- Coordinates: 36°53′06″N 54°27′11″E
- Country: Iran
- Province: Golestan
- County: Gorgan
- District: Baharan
- Rural District: Estarabad-e Shomali

Population (2016)
  - Total: 2,542
- Time zone: UTC+3:30 (IRST)

Kamasi (Persian: كماسي) (Note: Also romanized as Kamāsī; also known as Kafāsī) is a village in Estarabad-e Shomali Rural District of Baharan District in Gorgan County, Golestan province, Iran. The village is just a few kilometers north of Gorgan's city limits.

== Demographics ==
=== Population ===
At the time of the 2006 National Census, the village's population was 1,825 in 416 households. The following census in 2011 counted 2,129 people in 565 households. The 2016 census measured the population of the village as 2,542 people in 708 households.
