= Taqiabad, Golestan =

Village in Golestan province, Iran

Taqiabad Persian: تقي اباد
- Village
- Location within Iran
- Coordinates: 36°52′24″N 54°37′56″E
- Country: Iran
- Province: Golestan
- County: Gorgan
- District: Baharan
- Rural District: Qoroq

Population (2016)
  - Total: 1,869
- Time zone: UTC+3:30 (IRST)

Taqiabad (Persian: تقی‌آباد) (Note: Also romanized as Taqīābād) is a village in Qoroq Rural District of Baharan District in Gorgan County, Golestan province, Iran.

== Demographics ==
=== Population ===
At the time of the 2006 National Census, the village's population was 1,912 in 481 households. The following census in 2011 counted 1,822 people in 547 households. The 2016 census measured the population of the village as 1,869 people in 590 households.
