= Qoroq Rural District =

Rural district in Golestan province, Iran

Qoroq Rural District Persian: دهستان قرق
- Rural District
- Location within Iran
- Coordinates: 36°51′N 54°40′E
- Country: Iran
- Province: Golestan
- County: Gorgan
- District: Baharan
- Established: 1987
- Capital: Now Deh-e Malek

Population (2016)
  - Total: 23,307
- Time zone: UTC+3:30 (IRST)

Qoroq Rural District (Persian: دهستان قرق) is in Baharan District of Gorgan County, Golestan province, Iran. Its capital is the village of Now Deh-e Malek.

== Demographics ==
=== Population ===
At the time of the 2006 National Census, the rural district's population was 24,014 in 5,974 households. There were 24,139 inhabitants in 7,100 households at the following census of 2011. The 2016 census measured the population of the rural district as 23,307 in 7,264 households. The most populous of its 18 villages was Qoroq (now a city), with 6,701 people.

=== Other villages in the rural district ===
- Baluchabad
- Bolbol Tappeh
- Chenar Qeshlaq
- Genareh
- Guzan-e Fars
- Hoseynabad-e Malek
- Jafarabad
- Jahan Tigh
- Jahanabad-e Olya
- Jahanabad-e Sofla
- Mianabad-e Malek
- Qoliabad
- Taqiabad
- Teymurabad
- Toqor Tappeh
- Valeshabad
