= Fujerd, Golestan =

Village in Golestan province, Iran

Fujerd Persian: فوجرد
- Village
- Location within Iran
- Coordinates: 36°54′03″N 54°27′37″E
- Country: Iran
- Province: Golestan
- County: Gorgan
- District: Baharan
- Rural District: Estarabad-e Shomali

Population (2016)
  - Total: 1,092
- Time zone: UTC+3:30 (IRST)

Fujerd (Persian: فوجرد) (Note: Also romanized as Fūjerd) is a village in Estarabad-e Shomali Rural District of Baharan District in Gorgan County, Golestan province, Iran.

== Demographics ==
=== Population ===
At the time of the 2006 National Census, the village's population was 1,226 in 298 households. The following census in 2011 counted 1,234 people in 345 households. The 2016 census measured the population of the village as 1,092 people in 326 households.
