= Mianabad-e Malek =

Village in Golestan province, Iran

Mianabad-e Malek Persian: ميان اباد ملك
- Village
- Location within Iran
- Coordinates: 36°54′08″N 54°37′27″E
- Country: Iran
- Province: Golestan
- County: Gorgan
- District: Baharan
- Rural District: Qoroq

Population (2016)
  - Total: 572
- Time zone: UTC+3:30 (IRST)

Mianabad-e Malek (Persian: ميان اباد ملك) (Note: Also romanized as Mīānābād-e Malek; also known as Mīānābād) is a village in Qoroq Rural District of Baharan District in Gorgan County, Golestan province, Iran.

== Demographics ==
=== Population ===
At the time of the 2006 National Census, the village's population was 761 in 185 households. The following census in 2011 counted 699 people in 218 households. The 2016 census measured the population of the village as 572 people in 183 households.
