= Qoroq, Golestan =

City in Golestan province, Iran

Qoroq Persian: قرق
- City
- Location within Iran
- Coordinates: 36°53′24″N 54°42′44″E
- Country: Iran
- Province: Golestan
- County: Gorgan
- District: Baharan
- Established as a city: 2016

Population (2016)
  - Total: 6,701
- Time zone: UTC+3:30 (IRST)

Qoroq (Persian: قرق) (Note: Also known as Qoroq-e Bālā and Qoroq-e ‘Olyā) is a city in Baharan District of Gorgan County, Golestan province, Iran.

== Demographics ==
=== Ethnicity ===
Many of the residents of the village are Armenians who descend from people who immigrated from the Soviet Union in the 1930s.

=== Population ===
At the time of the 2006 National Census, Qoroq's population was 6,651 in 6,734 households, when it was a village in Qoroq Rural District. The following census in 2011 counted 6,734 people in 1,962 households. The 2016 census measured the population of the village as 6,701 people in 2,007 households. It was the most populous village in its rural district.

The village of Qoroq was converted to a city in 2016.
