= Qoliabad, Golestan =

Village in Golestan province, Iran

Qoliabad Persian: قلي اباد
- Village
- Location within Iran
- Coordinates: 36°54′53″N 54°39′39″E
- Country: Iran
- Province: Golestan
- County: Gorgan
- District: Baharan
- Rural District: Qoroq

Population (2016)
  - Total: 1,449
- Time zone: UTC+3:30 (IRST)

Qoliabad (Persian: قلي اباد) (Note: Also romanized as Qolīābād) is a village in Qoroq Rural District of Baharan District in Gorgan County, Golestan province, Iran.

== Demographics ==
=== Population ===
At the time of the 2006 National Census, the village's population was 1,617 in 392 households. The following census in 2011 counted 1,590 people in 495 households. The 2016 census measured the population of the village as 1,449 people in 479 households.
