= Buin-e Olya =

Village in Kurdistan province, Iran

Buin-e Olya Persian: بوئين عليا
- Village
- Location within Iran Location within Iran Kurdistan
- Coordinates: 35°57′55″N 46°01′03″E
- Country: Iran
- Province: Kurdistan
- County: Baneh
- District: Nanur
- Rural District: Buin

Population (2016)
  - Total: 338
- Time zone: UTC+3:30 (IRST)

Buin-e Olya (Persian: بوئين عليا) (Note: Also romanized as Bū'īn-e ‘Olyā; also known as Bīān Darreh, Buen, Bū’īn, Bū’īn-e Bālā, Būyen-e Bālā, and Būyen-e ‘Olyā) is a village in Buin Rural District of Nanur District in Baneh County, Kurdistan province, Iran.

== Demographics ==
=== Ethnicity ===
The village is populated by Kurds.

=== Population ===
At the time of the 2006 National Census, the village's population was 354 in 62 households. The following census in 2011 counted 351 people in 80 households. The 2016 census measured the population of the village as 338 people in 91 households.
