= Estarabad-e Shomali Rural District =

Rural district in Golestan province, Iran

Estarabad-e Shomali Rural District Persian: دهستان استرآباد شمالی
- Rural District
- Location within Iran
- Coordinates: 36°54′N 54°32′E
- Country: Iran
- Province: Golestan
- County: Gorgan
- District: Baharan
- Established: 1987
- Capital: Sarkhon Kalateh

Population (2016)
  - Total: 17,513
- Time zone: UTC+3:30 (IRST)

Estarabad-e Shomali Rural District (Persian: دهستان استرآباد شمالی) is in Baharan District of Gorgan County, Golestan province, Iran. It is administered from the city of Sarkhon Kalateh.

== Demographics ==
=== Population ===
At the time of the 2006 National Census, the rural district's population was 17,553 in 4,423 households. There were 17,680 inhabitants in 5,101 households at the following census of 2011. The 2016 census measured the population of the rural district as 17,513 in 5,356 households. The most populous of its 17 villages was Alu Kalateh, with 2,572 people.

=== Other villages in the rural district ===
- Aliabad-e Kenar Shahr
- Atra Chal
- Chahar Chenar
- Chuplani
- Darvishabad
- Fujerd
- Kamalabad
- Kamasi
- Marzan Kalateh
- Masumabad
- Mir Mahalleh
- Now Deh-e Sharif
- Rostam Kalateh-ye Sadat
- Shamsabad
- Soltanabad
- Turang Tappeh
