= Sarkhon Kalateh =

City in Golestan province, Iran

Sarkhon Kalateh Persian: سرخنكلاته
- City
- Location within Iran
- Coordinates: 36°53′29″N 54°34′08″E
- Country: Iran
- Province: Golestan
- County: Gorgan
- District: Baharan
- Established as a city: 2001

Population (2016)
  - Total: 7,589
- Time zone: UTC+3:30 (IRST)

Sarkhon Kalateh (Persian: سرخنكلاته) (Note: Also romanized as Sorkhan Kalāteh) is a city in, and the capital of, Baharan District in Gorgan County, Golestan province, Iran. It also serves as the administrative center for Estarabad-e Shomali Rural District. The village of Sarkhon Kalateh was converted to a city in 2001.

== Demographics ==
=== Population ===
At the time of the 2006 National Census, the city's population was 6,507 in 1,794 households. The following census in 2011 counted 6,688 people in 1,987 households. The 2016 census measured the population of the city as 7,589 people in 2,482 households.
