= Jahan Tigh, Golestan =

Village in Golestan province, Iran

Jahan Tigh Persian: جهان تيغ
- Village
- Location within Iran
- Coordinates: 36°52′57″N 54°39′53″E
- Country: Iran
- Province: Golestan
- County: Gorgan
- District: Baharan
- Rural District: Qoroq

Population (2016)
  - Total: 1,012
- Time zone: UTC+3:30 (IRST)

Jahan Tigh (Persian: جهان تيغ) (Note: Also romanized as Jahān Tīgh; also known as Jahān Tīghābād) is a village in Qoroq Rural District of Baharan District in Gorgan County, Golestan province, Iran.

== Demographics ==
=== Population ===
At the time of the 2006 National Census, the village's population was 1,129 in 257 households. The following census in 2011 counted 1,163 people in 340 households. The 2016 census measured the population of the village as 1,012 people in 325 households.
