= Neqab =

City in Razavi Khorasan Province, Iran

Neqab Persian: نقاب
- City
- Location within Iran
- Coordinates: 36°42′39″N 57°24′36″E
- Country: Iran
- Province: Razavi Khorasan
- County: Joveyn
- District: Central
- Established as a city: 1994

Population (2016)
  - Total: 14,783
- Time zone: UTC+3:30 (IRST)

Neqab (Persian: نقاب) (Note: Also romanized as Neqāb) is a city in the Central District of Joveyn County, Razavi Khorasan province, Iran, serving as capital of both the county and the district. It is also the administrative center for Bala Joveyn Rural District. The village of Neqab was converted to a city in 1994.

== Demographics ==
=== Population ===
At the time of the 2006 National Census, the city's population was 12,022 in 3,087 households, when it was in the former Joveyn District of Sabzevar County. The following census in 2011 counted 13,614 people in 3,792 households, by which time the district had been separated from the county in the establishment of Joveyn County. The city and the rural district were transferred to the new Central District, with Neqab as the county's capital. The 2016 census measured the population of the city as 14,783 people in 4,443 households.

The city has a railway station that is counted as a separate abadi in the Iranian census. At the 2006 census, its population was 357, in 95 families.
