= Buin-e Sofla =

City in Kurdistan province, Iran

Buin-e Sofla Persian: بوئين سفلی
- City
- Location within Iran Location within Iran Kurdistan
- Coordinates: 35°56′19″N 45°56′10″E
- Country: Iran
- Province: Kurdistan
- County: Baneh
- District: Nanur
- Established as a city: 2000

Population (2016)
  - Total: 1,518
- Time zone: UTC+3:30 (IRST)

Buin-e Sofla (Persian: بوئين سفلي) (Note: Also romanized as Būʼīn-e Soflá, Būyen Soflá, and Būyen-e Soflá; also known as Būyen and Būyen-e Pāʼīn) is a city in, and the capital of, Nanur District in Baneh County, Kurdistan province, Iran. It also serves as the administrative center for Buin Rural District. The village of Buin-e Sofla was converted to a city in 2000.

== Demographics ==
=== Ethnicity ===
The city is populated by Kurds.

=== Population ===
At the time of the 2006 National Census, the city's population was 1,069 in 206 households. The following census in 2011 counted 1,458 people in 324 households. The 2016 census measured the population of the city as 1,518 people in 403 households.
