= Bakhshabad, Chaharmahal and Bakhtiari =

Bakhshabad بخش اباد
- Village
- Location within Iran
- Coordinates: 32°22′54″N 50°21′44″E
- Country: Iran
- Province: Chaharmahal and Bakhtiari
- County: Kuhrang
- Bakhsh: Central
- Rural District: Dasht-e Zarrin

Population (2006)
  - Total: 160
- Time zone: UTC+3:30 (IRST)
  - Summer (DST): UTC+4:30 (IRDT)

Bakhshabad (Persian: بخش اباد, also Romanized as Bakhshābād) is a village in Dasht-e Zarrin Rural District, in the Central District of Kuhrang County, Chaharmahal and Bakhtiari Province, Iran. At the 2006 census, its population was 160, in 33 families. The village is populated by Lurs.
