= Stade Jean-Bouin =

Stade Jean-Bouin may refer to:

- Stade Jean-Bouin (Angers), former name of the Stade Raymond Kopa from 1968 to 2017
- Stade Jean-Bouin (Marseille), stadium in Marseille (part of the Jean Bouin Sports Complex)
- Stade Jean-Bouin (Nîmes), stadium in Nîmes
- Stade Jean-Bouin (Paris), stadium in Paris
