= Qoliabad, Kermanshah =

Qoliabad قلي اباد
- Village
- Location within Iran
- Coordinates: 34°14′26″N 47°29′46″E
- Country: Iran
- Province: Kermanshah
- County: Harsin
- Bakhsh: Central
- Rural District: Howmeh

Population (2006)
  - Total: 221
- Time zone: UTC+3:30 (IRST)
  - Summer (DST): UTC+4:30 (IRDT)

Qoliabad (Persian: قلي اباد, also Romanized as Qolīābād) is a village in Howmeh Rural District, in the Central District of Harsin County, Kermanshah Province, Iran. At the 2006 census, its population was 221, in 50 families.
