= Shilan, Kurdistan =

Shilan شيلان
- Village
- Location within Iran
- Coordinates: 35°05′48″N 46°56′28″E
- Country: Iran
- Province: Kurdistan
- County: Sanandaj
- Bakhsh: Central
- Rural District: Naran

Population (2006)
  - Total: 78
- Time zone: UTC+3:30 (IRST)
  - Summer (DST): UTC+4:30 (IRDT)

Shilan (Persian: شيلان, also Romanized as Shīlān) is a village in Naran Rural District, in the Central District of Sanandaj County, Kurdistan Province, Iran. At the 2006 census, its population was 78, in 18 families. The village is populated by Kurds.
