= Nanur Rural District =

Rural district in Kurdistan province, Iran

Nanur Rural District Persian: دهستان ننور
- Rural District
- Location within Iran Location within Iran Kurdistan
- Coordinates: 35°52′N 45°57′E
- Country: Iran
- Province: Kurdistan
- County: Baneh
- District: Nanur
- Established: 1993
- Capital: Nanur

Population (2016)
  - Total: 3,484
- Time zone: UTC+3:30 (IRST)

Nanur Rural District (Persian: دهستان ننور) is in Nanur District of Baneh County, Kurdistan province, Iran. Its capital is the village of Nanur.

== Demographics ==
=== Population ===
At the time of the 2006 National Census, the rural district's population was 3,104 in 540 households.< There were 3,411 inhabitants in 740 households at the following census of 2011. The 2016 census measured the population of the rural district as 3,484 in 917 households. The most populous of its 18 villages was Kileh-ye Abbasabad, with 1,122 people.

=== Other villages in the rural district ===
- Barvish Kani
- Hangeh-ye Zhal
- Khuriabad
- Oshtorabad
- Qul Estar
- Shasheh
