= Bid manager =

A bid manager is a sales role within an organization, responsible for managing bids generally in response to request for proposals (RFPs) from customers, but also as proactive pursuits for business. Bid managers orchestrate the creation of the solution and proposal as ‘Bid Project Managers’ ensuring compliance with customer requirements while highlighting company value proposition. The role of a bid manager (BM) often works with company board directors and C-level management (i.e. CEO, CFO) to bring and deliver strategic approaches to win bids.

== Bid management ==
Bid managers are responsible for the proposal of bids to existing or prospective clients for projects. A bid manager will ensure the smooth running of the bid for a project within the correct time and financial parameters, and manage the relationship with the client.

Bid managers may work in conjunction with a bid director and often with specialists in the construction and built environment industries to create and manage the bid for a project.

A bid manager's role varies based on the industry and how the individual company has structured their management of sales cycle. A company that depends on short (quick win) sales cycle often relies on proposal managers, where as organisations that depends on longer term, complex sales processes depends on bid managers. In addition to managing bids, bid managers work closely with company board directors and C-level management to set the strategic direction of the business by providing insight into market trends through direct exposure to critical feedback from failed bids and the evolving needs of clients.
