= Pirakuh Rural District =

Rural district in Razavi Khorasan province, Iran

Pirakuh Rural District Persian: دهستان پيراكوه
- Rural District
- Location within Iran
- Coordinates: 36°32′N 57°26′E
- Country: Iran
- Province: Razavi Khorasan
- County: Joveyn
- District: Central
- Established: 1987
- Capital: Barghamad

Population (2016)
  - Total: 6,106
- Time zone: UTC+3:30 (IRST)

Pirakuh Rural District (Persian: دهستان پيراكوه) is in the Central District of Joveyn County, Razavi Khorasan province, Iran. Its capital is the village of Barghamad.

== Demographics ==
=== Population ===
At the time of the 2006 National Census, the rural district's population (as a part of the former Joveyn District in Sabzevar County) was 5,377 in 1,732 households. There were 6,893 inhabitants in 2,092 households at the following census of 2011, by which time the district had been separated from the county in the establishment of Joveyn County. The rural district was transferred to the new Central District. The 2016 census measured the population of the rural district as 6,106 in 2,101 households. The most populous of its 27 villages was Barghamad, with 2,449 people.

=== Other villages in the rural district ===
- Arg-e Now Juy
- Bid Khowr
- Jalambadan
- Menj-e Shirin
- Mianabad
- Ramshin
