= Bala Joveyn Rural District =

Rural district in Razavi Khorasan province, Iran

Bala Joveyn Rural District Persian: دهستان بالا جوين
- Rural District
- Location within Iran
- Coordinates: 36°43′N 57°22′E
- Country: Iran
- Province: Razavi Khorasan
- County: Joveyn
- District: Central
- Established: 1987
- Capital: Neqab

Population (2016)
  - Total: 17,536
- Time zone: UTC+3:30 (IRST)

Bala Joveyn Rural District (Persian: دهستان بالا جوين) is in the Central District of Joveyn County, Razavi Khorasan province, Iran. It is administered from the city of Neqab.

== Demographics ==
=== Population ===
At the time of the 2006 National Census, the rural district's population (as a part of the former Joveyn District in Sabzevar County) was 17,090 in 4,272 households. There were 18,004 inhabitants in 5,031 households at the following census of 2011, by which time the district had been separated from the county in the establishment of Joveyn County. The rural district was transferred to the new Central District. The 2016 census measured the population of the rural district as 17,536 in 5,350 households. The most populous of its 47 villages was Razi, with 4,250 people.

=== Other villages in the rural district ===
- Abbasabad-e Malek
- Ahmadabad-e Malek
- Andadeh
- Fathabad-e Now
- Hajjiabad-e Hajji Safar
- Kalateh-ye Andadeh
- Kalateh-ye Meymari
- Koruzhadeh
- Zurabad
