= Hokmabad Rural District =

Rural district in Razavi Khorasan province, Iran

Hokmabad Rural District Persian: دهستان حكم آباد
- Rural District
- Location within Iran
- Coordinates: 36°39′N 57°33′E
- Country: Iran
- Province: Razavi Khorasan
- County: Joveyn
- District: Atamalek
- Established: 1987
- Capital: Hokmabad

Population (2016)
  - Total: 11,295
- Time zone: UTC+3:30 (IRST)

Hokmabad Rural District (Persian: دهستان حكم آباد) is in Atamalek District of Joveyn County, Razavi Khorasan province, Iran. It is administered from the city of Hokmabad.

== Demographics ==
=== Population ===
At the time of the 2006 National Census, the rural district's population (as a part of the former Joveyn District in Sabzevar County) was 15,094 in 3,891 households. There were 11,186 inhabitants in 3,179 households at the following census of 2011, by which time the district had been separated from the county in the establishment of Joveyn County. The rural district was transferred to the new Atamalek District. The 2016 census measured the population of the rural district as 11,295 in 3,349 households. The most populous of its 30 villages was Hokmabad (now a city), with 3,824 people.

=== Other villages in the rural district ===
- Abbasabad-e Arab
- Bahramiyeh
- Ebrahimabad Abu Talab
- Esmailabad
- Hajjiabad-e Bazzazi
- Kalateh-ye Shahidan
- Kheyrabad
- Khorramabad
- Nanva
