= Buin Rural District =

Rural district in Kurdistan province, Iran

Buin Rural District Persian: دهستان بوئين
- Rural District
- Location within Iran Location within Iran Kurdistan
- Coordinates: 35°55′53″N 45°59′32″E
- Country: Iran
- Province: Kurdistan
- County: Baneh
- District: Nanur
- Capital: Buin-e Sofla

Population (2016)
  - Total: 4,467
- Time zone: UTC+3:30 (IRST)

Buin Rural District (Persian: دهستان بوئين) is in Nanur District of Baneh County, Kurdistan province, Iran. It is administered from the city of Buin-e Sofla.

== Demographics ==
=== Population ===
At the time of the 2006 National Census, the rural district's population was 5,172 in 905 households. There were 4,524 inhabitants in 977 households at the following census of 2011. The 2016 census measured the population of the rural district as 4,467 in 1,198 households. The most populous of its 31 villages was Surin, with 458 people.

=== Other villages in the rural district ===
- Bian Darreh
- Buin-e Olya
- Chichuran
- Gavizleh
- Karimabad
- Valiabad
