= Atamalek District =

District in Razavi Khorasan province, Iran

Atamalek District Persian: بخش عطاملك
- District
- Location within Iran
- Coordinates: 36°38′N 57°40′E
- Country: Iran
- Province: Razavi Khorasan
- County: Joveyn
- Established: 2007
- Capital: Hokmabad

Population (2016)
  - Total: 15,865
- Time zone: UTC+3:30 (IRST)

Atamalek District (Persian: بخش عطاملك) is in Joveyn County, Razavi Khorasan province, Iran. Its capital is the city of Hokmabad.

== History ==
In 2007, Joveyn District was separated from Sabzevar County in the establishment of Joveyn County, which was divided into two districts of two rural districts each, with Neqab as its capital and only city at the time. The village of Hokmabad was converted to a city in 2018.

== Demographics ==
=== Population ===
At the time of the 2011 National Census, the district's population was 15,372 people in 4,427 households. The 2016 census measured the population of the district as 15,865 inhabitants in 4,786 households.

=== Administrative divisions ===
Atamalek District Population
| Administrative Divisions | 2011 | 2016 |
|---|---|---|
| Hokmabad RD | 11,186 | 11,295 |
| Zarrin RD | 4,186 | 4,570 |
| Hokmabad (city) (Note: Became a city after the 2016 census) | | |
| Total | 15,372 | 15,865 |
RD = Rural District
