= Central District (Joveyn County) =

District in Razavi Khorasan province, Iran

Central District (Joveyn County) Persian: بخش مرکزی شهرستان جوین
- District
- Location within Iran
- Coordinates: 36°37′N 57°25′E
- Country: Iran
- Province: Razavi Khorasan
- County: Joveyn
- Established: 2007
- Capital: Neqab

Population (2016)
  - Total: 38,425
- Time zone: UTC+3:30 (IRST)

The Central District of Joveyn County (Persian: بخش مرکزی شهرستان جوین) is in Razavi Khorasan province, Iran. Its capital is the city of Neqab.

== History ==
In 2007, Joveyn District was separated from Sabzevar County in the establishment of Joveyn County, which was divided into two districts of two rural districts each, with Neqab as its capital and only city at the time.

== Demographics ==
=== Population ===
At the time of the 2011 National Census, the district's population was 38,511 people in 10,915 households. The 2016 census measured the population of the district as 38,425 inhabitants in 11,894 households.

=== Administrative divisions ===
Central District (Joveyn County) Population
Administrative Divisions	2011	2016
Bala Joveyn RD	18,004	17,536
Pirakuh RD	6,893	6,106
Neqab (city)	13,614	14,783
Total	38,511	38,425
RD = Rural District
