= Nanur District =

District in Kurdistan province, Iran

Nanur District Persian: بخش ننور
- District
- Location within Iran Location within Iran Kurdistan
- Coordinates: 35°55′N 46°00′E
- Country: Iran
- Province: Kurdistan
- County: Baneh
- Capital: Buin-e Sofla

Population (2016)
  - Total: 9,469
- Time zone: UTC+3:30 (IRST)

Nanur District (Persian: بخش ننور) is in Baneh County, Kurdistan province, Iran. Its capital is the city of Buin-e Sofla.

== Demographics ==
=== Population ===
At the time of the 2006 National Census, the district's population was 9,345 in 1,651 households. The following census in 2011 counted 9,393 people in 2,041 households The 2016 census measured the population of the district as 9,469 inhabitants in 2,518 households.

=== Administrative divisions ===
Nanur District Population
Administrative Divisions	2006	2011	2016
Buin RD	5,172	4,524	4,467
Nanur RD	3,104	3,411	3,484
Buin-e Sofla (city)	1,069	1,458	1,518
Total	9,345	9,393	9,469
RD = Rural District
