= Baharan District =

District in Golestan province, Iran

Baharan District Persian: بخش بهاران
- District
- Location within Iran
- Coordinates: 36°52′N 54°35′E
- Country: Iran
- Province: Golestan
- County: Gorgan
- Established: 2000
- Capital: Sarkhon Kalateh

Population (2016)
  - Total: 48,409
- Time zone: UTC+3:30 (IRST)

Baharan District (Persian: بخش بهاران) is in Gorgan County, Golestan province, Iran. Its capital is the city of Sarkhon Kalateh.

== History ==
The village of Qoroq was converted to a city in 2016.

== Demographics ==
=== Population ===
At the time of the 2006 census, the district's population was 48,074 in 12,191 households. The following census in 2011 counted 48,507 people in 14,188 households. The 2016 census measured the population of the district as 48,409 inhabitants in 15,102 households.

Baharan District Population
Administrative Divisions	2006	2011	2016
Estarabad-e Shomali RD	17,553	17,680	17,513
Qoroq RD	24,014	24,139	23,307
Qoroq (city) (Note: Became a city after the 2016 census)			
Sarkhon Kalateh (city)	6,507	6,688	7,589
Total	48,074	48,507	48,409
RD = Rural District
