= Joveyn District =

Former district in Razavi Khorasan province, Iran

Joveyn District Persian: بخش جوین
- Former District
- Location within Iran
- Coordinates: 36°37′N 57°33′E
- Country: Iran
- Province: Razavi Khorasan
- County: Sabzevar
- Capital: Neqab

Population (2006)
  - Total: 49,583
- Time zone: UTC+3:30 (IRST)

Joveyn District (Persian: بخش جوین) is a former administrative division of Sabzevar County, Razavi Khorasan province, Iran. Its capital was the city of Neqab.

== History ==
In 2007, the district was separated from the county in the establishment of Joveyn County.

== Demographics ==
=== Population ===
At the time of the 2006 National Census, the district's population was 49,583 in 12,982 households.

=== Administrative divisions ===
Joveyn District Population
Administrative Divisions	2006
Bala Joveyn RD	17,090
Hokmabad RD	15,094
Pirakuh RD	5,377
Neqab (city)	12,022
Total	49,583
RD = Rural District
