= Joveyn County =

County in Razavi Khorasan Province, Iran

Joveyn County Persian: شهرستان جوین
- County
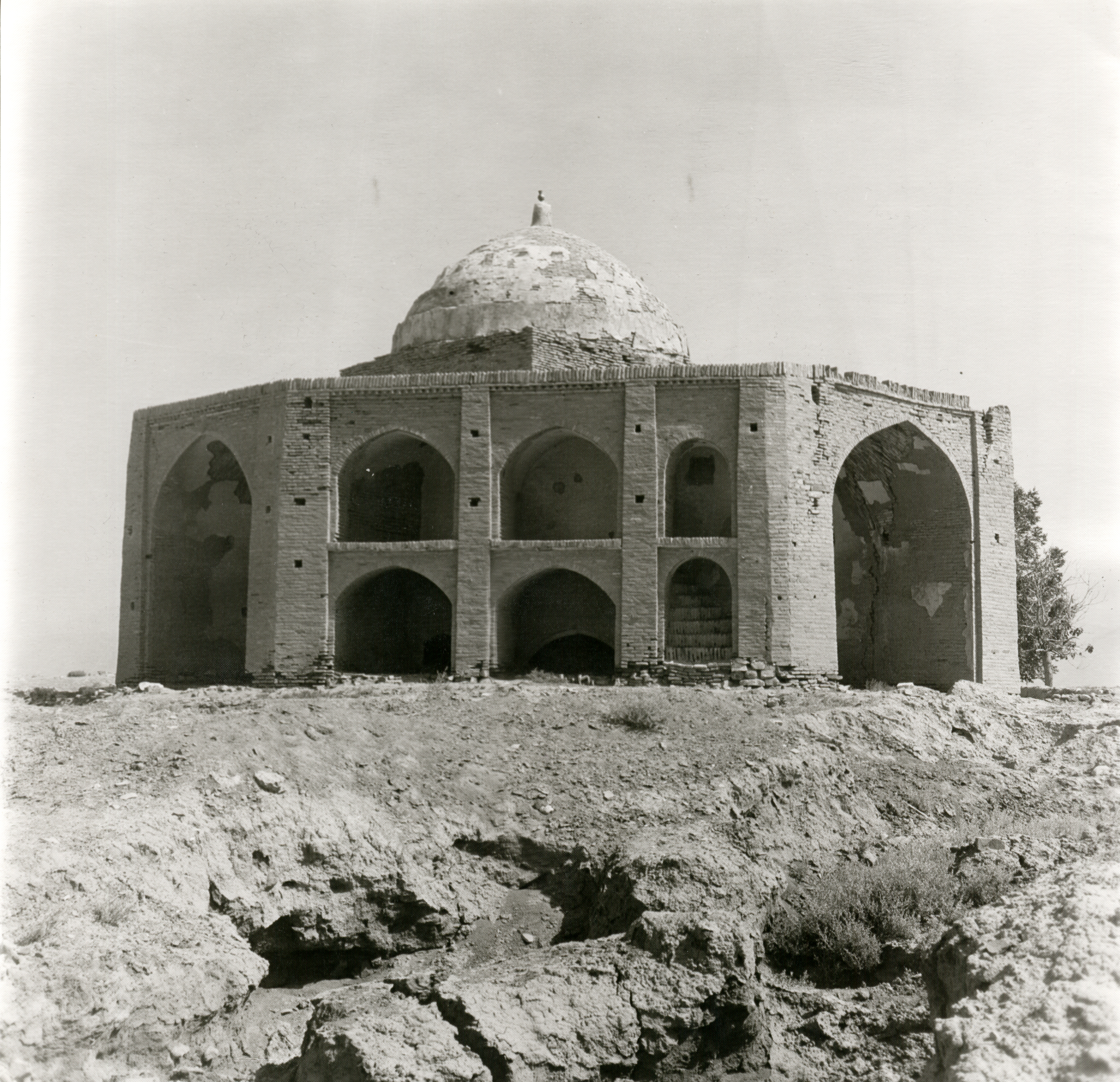
- Seyyed Hasan Qaznavi's Mausoleum

- Location of Joveyn County in Razavi Khorasan province (top left, purple)

- Location of Razavi Khorasan province in Iran
- Coordinates: 36°37′N 57°33′E
- Country: Iran
- Province: Razavi Khorasan
- Established: 2007
- Capital: Neqab
- Districts: Central, Atamalek

Area
  - Total: 1,653 km^{2} (638 sq mi)

Population (2016)
  - Total: 54,488
  - Density: 32.96/km^{2} (85.37/sq mi)
- Time zone: UTC+3:30 (IRST)

Joveyn County (Persian: شهرستان جوین) is in Razavi Khorasan province, Iran. Its capital is the city of Neqab.

== History ==
In 2007, Joveyn District was separated from Sabzevar County in the establishment of Joveyn County, which was divided into two districts of two rural districts each, with Neqab as its capital and only city at the time. The village of Hokmabad was converted to a city in 2018.

== Demographics ==
=== Population ===
At the time of the 2011 National Census, the county's population was 54,139 people in 15,400 households. The 2016 census measured the population of the county as 54,488 in 16,738 households.

=== Administrative divisions ===
Joveyn County's population history and administrative structure over two consecutive censuses are shown in the following table.

Joveyn County Population
Administrative Divisions	2011	2016
Central District	38,511	38,425
Bala Joveyn RD	18,004	17,536
Pirakuh RD	6,893	6,106
Neqab (city)	13,614	14,783
Atamalek District	15,372	15,865
Hokmabad RD	11,186	11,295
Zarrin RD	4,186	4,570
Hokmabad (city) (Note: Became a city after the 2016 census)		
Total	54,139	54,488
RD = Rural District

== See also ==
Media related to Joveyn County at Wikimedia Commons
