= List of cities, towns and villages in Kurdistan province =

A list of cities, towns and villages in Kurdistan Province of western Iran:

== Alphabetical ==
Cities are in bold text; all others are villages.

=== A ===
Ab Bareh | Ab Barik | Ab Barik | Ab Barik | Ab Barik | Abbas Jub | Abbasabad | Abbasabad | Abbasabad | Abbasabad | Abdolabad | Abu ol Mowmen | Adinan | Afarian-e Sofla | Afrasiab | Agh Kand | Aghbolagh-e Ali Akbar Khan | Aghbolagh-e Hoseyn Khan | Aghbolagh-e Taghamin | Aghcheh Gonbad | Aghkand-e Olya | Aghyazi | Agjeh | Ahangaran | Ahmad Mardeh | Ahmadabad Sara | Ahmadabad Sunaj | Ahmadabad | Ahmadabad | Ahmadabad | Ahmadabad | Ahmadabad-e Bash | Ahmadabad-e Panjeh | Ahmadabad-e Tefli | Ahmadkar | Ajgareh | Aji Chay | Akbarabad | Akh Kand | Akh Kand | Akhi Kamal | Akhzarabad | Alagoz | Al-e Kabud | Aleyar | Ali Badal | Ali Hamadan | Ali Jan | Ali Makan | Ali Mardeh | Ali Panik | Aliabad | Aliabad | Aliabad | Aliabad | Aliabad | Aliabad | Aliabad-e Bezindar | Aliabad-e Duleh Rash | Aliabad-e Karaftu | Aliabad-e Luch | Aliabad-e Maran | Aliabad-e Moshir | Aliabad-e Yalghuz Aghaj | Alijan | Alishah | Alk | Alkalu | Alk-e Kohneh | Allah Darreh-ye Olya | Allah Darreh-ye Sofla | Allahyari | Almaneh | Alphut | Altun-e Olya | Altun-e Sofla | Alut | Alvand Qoli | Aminabad | Aminabad | Aminabad-e Hayateh Bozorg | Aminabad-e Qaslan | Amir Aslan | Amirabad | Amirabad | Amirabad | Amirabad-e Qaleh Lan | Amreh Sit | Amrowleh | Anbar Ab | Anbar Bozan | Andar | Andarab | Anguzhan | Anjileh | Anjineh-ye Ebrahim-e Jonubi | Anjineh-ye Ebrahim-e Shomali | Anjineh-ye Sofla | Anjiran | Anjomneh | Aq Bolagh | Aq Bolagh | Aq Bolagh | Aq Bolagh | Aq Bolagh-e Chang Almas | Aq Tappeh | Aqa Jeri | Arab Lang | Arab Ughluy-e Olya | Arab Ughluy-e Sofla | Arandan | Arazand | Armardeh | Aryan | Asaveleh | Asavleh | Asefabad | Aseman Darreh | Asenabad | Asgaran | Ashab-e Olya | Ashab-e Sofla | Ashrafabad-e Quch | Asiab Jub | Asleh Marz | Asrabad | Asrabad | Asrabad-e Tazeh | Atabak | Avengan | Avengan Industrial Estate | Avihang | Ayaghchi | Aychi | Ayyub | Azad Veys-e Olya | Azad Veys-e Sofla | Azamabad | Azizabad

=== B ===
Baba Gorgor | Baba Karam | Baba Khan | Baba Nazar | Baba Rar | Baba Riz | Baba Rostam | Baba Sheydollah | Baba Sorkheh | Baba | Babarashani | Bademjan | Badrabad | Bageh Jan | Bagh Chaleh | Baghan | Baghcheh-ye Maryam | Baghcheleh | Baghdeh Kandi | Baghlujeh | Baghlujeh | Baharestan | Baharlu | Bahmanabad | Bahram Gonbad | Bahram | Bahramabad | Bakerabad | Bakhleh | Bakhorram-e Olya | Balaqolu | Baleh Dasti | Balek | Balkar | Balucheh | Balvaneh-ye Khaledi | Balvaneh-ye Motamedi | Balveh | Banavan | Banavchan | Band Zhazh | Bandul | Baneh | Bansaid-e Olya | Bansaid-e Sofla | Baqelabad | Baqerabad | Baqerabad | Bar Qaleh | Bar Qaleh | Barakeh | Baraqu | Baraver | Barazan Industrial Plant | Barazan | Barcham | Bardeh Buk | Bardeh Rash | Bardeh Rash | Bardeh Rash-e Kuchek | Bardeh Rash-e Tabriz Khatun | Bardeh Rasheh | Bardeh Rasheh | Bardeh Rasheh | Bardeh Sefid | Bardeh Sefid | Bargoshad | Barudar | Barvish Kani | Barvish Kani | Barya Khan | Barzab | Bash Qeshlaq | Bashbolagh | Bashmaq | Bashmaq | Bashmaq | Bashuki | Bashvan | Bastam | Bay Tamer | Bayanchoqlu | Bayanchub | Bayanlu | Bayazidabad | Bayazidabad | Bayeh | Bayizid | Bayveh | Bazi Robab | Bazvash | Belan | Belcheh Sur | Beleh Keh | Belehjar | Benav Cheleh | Benavileh-ye Kohneh | Bermeh Tappeh | Best | Beyg Oveysi | Bezhi | Bian Darreh | Biar | Bid Darreh | Bidarashan | Bijar | Bikash | Bileh | Bilu | Bilu | Bisaran | Bolbanabad | Bolbar | Boneh Dar | Boneh Khvoy | Boneh Rezan | Borjageh | Bostan Darreh | Bowalhasan | Bowdela | Boz Laneh | Bozan | Buaneh | Bubaktan | Building Stone Factory | Buin-e Olya | Buin-e Sofla | Bukhlu | Burban | Buridar

=== C ===
Chaghar Bolagh | Chagharlu | Chahar Gah | Chakasheh | Chalab | Chalgah | Chali Bolagh | Chali Sur | Chamaqlu | Changiz Qaleh | Chapan-e Olya | Chapan-e Sofla | Chaqmaq Darreh | Charandu | Charkheh Bayan | Charmileh | Chatan | Chavak | Chavelkan-e Hajji | Chavelkan-e Vazir | Chehel Amiran | Chehel Amiran | Chehel Gazi | Chenaran | Chenareh | Chenareh | Chenareh | Chenartu | Cheragh Veys | Cheraghabad | Cheraghabad-e Shokrabad | Chersaneh | Cheshmeh Adineh | Cheshmeh Deraz | Cheshmeh Jan Qoli | Cheshmeh Kabud | Cheshmeh Kazem | Cheshmeh Khalil | Cheshmeh Kureh | Cheshmeh Mantash | Cheshmeh Qoli | Cheshmeh Rubah | Cheshmeh Sangin | Cheshmidar | Chetaq | Chi Chi Khvar | Chichuran | Chilak | Choghur Qeshlaq | Chomoqlu Sheyda | Chonu | Chopoqlu | Choqa Beraleh | Chowljeh | Chuin | Chul Bolagh | Chuman | Chumolu | Chupi | Chur

=== D ===
Dabagh | Dadaneh | Dadaneh Kamangar | Dadash Kandi | Dagan | Dal | Dalak | Dalan | Daleh Marz | Dalu | Damiv | Danan | Danikesh | Dar Ghias | Dar Tut | Darabi | Daraki | Daram Rud | Darband | Darband-e Aziz | Darbandeh | Dareveyan | Dareveyan-e Fares | Dargah-e Sheykhan | Dargala shikeyan | Dargah-e Sheykhan | Dargah-e Soleyman | Dari | Darineh-ye Olya | Darreh Abi | Darreh Asb | Darreh Esmailiyeh | Darreh Gavan | Darreh Hovan | Darreh Khoshkeh | Darreh Kuleh | Darreh Nakhi | Darreh Panbeh Dan | Darreh Panbeh Dan | Darreh Panbehdan | [Dashtan] | Darreh Qebleh | Darreh Sheykhan | Darreh Softeh | Darreh Tefi | Darreh Varan | Darreh Vazan | Darreh Vazan-e Olya | Darreh Vazan-e Sofla | Darreh Veyan-e Olya | Darreh Veyan-e Sofla | Darreh Ziarat-e Olya | Darreh Ziarat-e Sofla | Darreh-ye Hard | Darreh-ye Tafi | Daruleh | Darvian-e Olya | Darvian-e Sofla | Darvish Khaki | Darvishan | Darvishan | Darzian | Dash Bolagh | Dash Kasan | Degagah | Degagah | Deh Boneh | Deh Bonyad | Deh Raqeh-ye Pir Hoseyn | Deh-e Kanan | Deh-e Rashid | Dehgolan | Delbaran | Delow Amadeh | Dereyleh | Deymeh | Deyvaznav | Dezej | Dezhan | Dezli | Dezvand-e Olya | Dezvand-e Sofla | Diraklu | Dirmuli | Divandarreh | Divar | Divzand | Do Palureh | Do Sar | Do Sar | Do Sineh | Dormeh | Dorud | Doveyseh | Doveyseh | Dowlat Qaleh | Dowlatabad | Dowlatabad | Dowlatkand | Dowleh Guyer | Dowleh Sir | Dul Arzan | Dul Bagh | Dul Kor | Dulab | Dulbandi | Dushan | Duzakh Darreh | Duzakh Darreh

=== E ===
Ebrahimabad | Ebrahimabad | Ebrahimabad | Ebrahimabad | Ebrahimabad-e Olya va Sofla | Eshaqabad | Eshkaftan | Eslamabad | Eslamabad | Eslamabad | Eslamabad | Eslamabad | Espeh Riz

=== F ===
Fakhrabad | Faqih Soleyman | Farajabad | Farhadabad | Farsabad | Fathabad | Fattahabad | Fetreh Zamin | Feyzabad | Firuzabad

=== G ===
Gadmeh Gater | Gagal | Gaidar | Galali | Galan | Galin | Gandab | Gandab-e Olya | Gandab-e Sofla | Gandoman | Gandoman | Ganehbu | [[Garabad, Kurdistan|Garabad]] | Garachoqa | Gardiglan | Garmab | Garmab | Garmash | Garmidar | Gashkaseh | Gashki | Gav Ahantu | Gav Bazeh | Gav Daneh Zar | Gav Darreh | Gavandag | Gaveshan | Gavileh | Gavizeh | Gavizleh | Gavkach-e Olya | Gavkach-e Sofla | Gavshaleh | Gavshaleh | Gazan-e Olya | Gazan-e Sofla | Gazar Darreh | Gazer Khani | Gazgazareh-ye Olya | Gazgazareh-ye Sofla | Gazneh | Gelah Sur | Gelaneh | Geleh Sureh | Geleh | Geleyeh | Geliyan | Gerd Miran-e Olya | Gerd Miran-e Sofla | Gereh Cheqa | Gerger-e Olya | Gerger-e Sofla | Gerizeh | Gezel Qayeh | Gheybi Sur | Ghiasabad | Gholamali | Gilaklu | Gili Karan | Gizmel-e Olya | Gizmel-e Sofla | Gol Bolagh | Gol Bolagh-e Sofla | Gol Qabagh | Gol Qaleh | Gol Qeshlaq | Gol Tappeh | Gol Tappeh-ye Olya | Gol Tappeh-ye Sofla | Gol Tappeh-ye Taghamin | Golaneh | Gol-e Cheydar | Golestaneh | Golzar-e Olya | Gom Darreh | Gomareh Lang | Gonbad-e Hajji | Gonbadeh-e Olya | Gonbadi | Gorganeh | Gorgin | Gorji | Govaz | Govozleh | Gowjeh Kand | Gowyzeh-ye Kavireh | Gug Qash | Gug Tappeh | Gugjeh | Guil | Gumehi | Gur-e-Baba Ali | Gureh Qaleh | Gurehdar | Guricheh | Gushkhani

=== H ===
Habaki | Haft Tash | Hah Shamiz | Hajji Abdol | Hajji Hasan | Hajji Mamdan | Hajji Musa | Hajji Pamoq | Hajji Shureh | Hajjiabad | Hajjiabad | Hajjiabad-e Bozorg | Hajjiabad-e Seyyedeh | Halizabad | Haltushan | Halu | Haluzhan | Halvan | Hamzah Qarnian | Hamzeh Lan | Haneh Gelan | Haneh Sheykhan | Hang Chineh | Hang-e Zhaleh | Hangeh-ye Zhal | Hanis | Haqqeh | Harmidul | Harmileh | Harsin | Hasan Khan | Hasan Owleh | Hasan Qareh | Hasan Salaran | Hasan Teymur-e Olya | Hasanabad | Hasanabad | Hasanabad | Hasanabad | Hasanabad-e Charuq | Hasanabad-e Mohammad Nazar | Hasanabad-e Qashoq | Hashli | Hashli | Hashtad Joft | Havareh Khul | Helizabad | Hendi Bolagh | Hendiman | Hesar Sefid | Heyatabad | Heyatabad | Heydar Didehban | Heydarabad | Hezar Kanian | Hezar Khani | Hijan | Hijanan | Homayun | Hoseyn Khan | Hoseynabad | Hoseynabad | Hoseynabad | Hoseynabad-e Demirchi | Hoseynabad-e Gorgan | Hoseynabad-e Kamarzard | Hoseynabad-e Kangareh | Hoseynabad-e Marran | Hoseynabad-e Zelleh Jub | Hoseyni | Hovanleh | Hovarpan | Hurazeh | Huyeh

=== I ===
Idahlu | Ilu | Inchekeh | Inchekeh | Irab | Isa Dar | Isaabad | Isavli

=== J ===
Jafar | Jafarabad | Jafarabad | Jafarabad | Jafarkhan | Jalileh | Jameh Shuran | Jamian | Janvareh-ye Khvarag | Jaqalu | Jashniabad | Javanmardabad | Jebreil | Jebreilan | Jeyran | Jeyran Mangeh | Jodaqayah | Joniyan | Jowrvandi | Julandeh | Jushan

=== K ===
Ka Rostam | Kabud Khani-ye Olya | Kabud Khani-ye Sofla | Kachal Mangan | Kacheh Gonbad | Kacheh Gonbad | Kachleh | Kahriz | Kahrizeh | Kahrizeh | Kahrizeh | Kahrizeh-ye Ayyubi | Kaka Abbas | Kakah Jub | Kakehsiab | Kaklikabad | Kaku Zakaria | Kakuy-e Olya | Kakuy-e Sofla | Kalati | Kalati | Kal-e Olya | Kal-e Sofla | Kaleh Yunjeh | Kalhorabad | Kalji | Kalkan | Kalkan | Kalkeh Jan | Kalkeh Jar | Kamalabad-e Shahabiyeh | Kamaleh | Kamantu | Kamareh | Kameshgaran | Kamyaran | Kandal | Kandalan | Kandeh Sureh | Kandeh Sureh | Kandulan | Kanemat | Kangareh | Kani Band | Kani Band | Kani Bard | Kani Benav | Kani Bid | Kani Chay | Kani Chay | Kani Chulkeh | Kani Dinar | Kani Eyn Ali | Kani Ganji | Kani Gashah | Kani Goli | Kani Guyz | Kani Hangah | Kani Holucheh | Kani Hoseynbag | Kani Jeshni | Kani Kabud | Kani Kabud-e Maran | Kani Kan | Kani Kharrat | Kani Kuchek | Kani Kuzaleh | Kani Mamer | Kani Miran | Kani Moshkan | Kani Niaz | Kani Now | Kani Pahan | Kani Pari | Kani Pezmakeh | Kani Sanan | Kani Savaran | Kani Sefid | Kani Sefid | Kani Sefid | Kani Sefid | Kani Seyf | Kani Seyf | Kani Seyyed | Kani Seyyed Morad | Kani Seyyed Shokereh | Kani Shah Qoli | Kani Shalaneh | Kani Shilan | Kani Shirin | Kani Sib | Kani Sib | Kani Sorkh | Kani Sur | Kani Sur | Kani Taleh | Kani Tamar Khan | Kapak | Kaqoli | Karabad | Karaftu | Karahsi | Kareh Gol | Kargabad | Kargineh | Karim Kandi | Karimabad | Karimabad | Karimabad-e Ali Verdi | Karimabad-e Ayaghchi | Karju | Karreh Puvan | Karuz | Karvandan | Karvian | Kas Nazan | Kas Nazan | Kashtar | Katak | Kavaneh-ye Hoseyn | Kavaneh-ye Sharif | Kavireh Guyez | Kavmeleh | Kay Vosheh | Kazemabad | Kazemabad | Kazhi Karan | Kechi Gerd | Keh Kusan | Khak Ruzi | Khakibeyg | Khaleh Bazeh | Khalichian | Khalifeh Torkhan | Khamesan | Khan Baghi | Khan Kandi | Khanabad | Khanabad | Khandan Qoli | Khaneh Miran | Khaneqah Juju | Khaneqah-e Gelin | Khaneqah-e Hasan Gavgir | Khaneqah-e Razab | Khaneqah-e Sheykh | Khanom Kan | Khanom Sheykhan | Khanomabad | Khapureh Deh | Kharabeh-ye Chul Arkh | Kharileh | Khav | Kheydar | Kheyrabad | Kheyrabad | Khezerlak | Khezrdin | Khiareh | Khoramta | Khorasan | Khorramabad | Khoruseh | Khoshkamrud-e Olya | Khoshkamrud-e Sofla | Khoshkeh Darreh | Khoshkeh Dul | Khoshkin | Khoshkin-e Kumasi | Khosrowabad | Khuriabad | Khusheh Darreh | Khusheh Darreh | Khusheh Gol | Khushinan | Khvajeh Mir | Khvoasht | Khvodlan | Khvor Khvoreh | Khvor Khvoreh | Khvordeh Luki | Khvosh Maqam | Khvosh Qeshlaq | Khvoshab | Kikan | Kilaneh | Kileh Golan | Kileh Kabud | Kileh Sefid | Kileh Shin | Kileh-ye Abbasabad | Kilek | Kislan | Kivaleh | Kiveh Rud | Kohal | Kolah Dul | Kolehzan | Kolucheh | Konamar | Kongereh | Kord Kand | Koshneh | Kowleh | Kucheh Tala | Kuchek-e Olya | Kuchek-e Sofla | Kucher | Kuik | Kukh Sheykh ol Eslam | Kukhan | Kukh-e Hajji Karim | Kukh-e Kani Guyz | Kukh-e Mamu | Kukh-e Sufi Rashi Piruz | Kul | Kulan | Kulasah | Kuleh Bayan | Kuleh Sareh | Kulich | Kulit-e Hoseynabad | Kumain | Kupeh Qaran | Kupich | Kupich-e Olya | Kupich-e Sofla | Kur Kureh | Kureh Darreh | Kureh Darreh-ye Olya | Kureh Darreh-ye Sofla | Kus Anbar | Kutan-e Sofla | Kuyreh Guyzeh

=== L ===
Lalehi | Langariz | Lareh Val | Lavisan | Layen | Legzi | Lenjabad | Lenjabad | Lown-e Kohneh | Lown-e Sadat

=== M ===
Machekeh-ye Olya | Machekeh-ye Sofla | Madak | Mahidar-e Olya | Mahidar-e Sofla | Mahmud Gazag | Mahmudabad | Mahmudabad | Mahmudeh | Majidabad | Malateh | Malekabad | Malekshan-e Olya | Malekshan-e Sofla | Malqarani | Malujeh | Mam Seyf ol Din | Mamal | Maman | Mamukh-e Olya | Mamukh-e Sofla | Mamuleh | Mandil Besar | Manijalan | Mansur Bolaghi | Maqut | Marab | Maran-e Olya | Maran-e Sofla | Maraneh | Mareh Darreh | Marenj | Marivan | Markhoz | Marqad | Masan | Masidar | Masidar-e Sofla | Masudabad | Masumabad | Mavian | Mayian Dul | Mazerlan | Maziben | Mazrah | Mazujdar | Mazujedar | Mehdikhan | Mehrab | Mehrabad | Mejin | Meleh | Mereg | Meydan-e Mozaffarkhan | Meydaneh | Meyham-e Olya | Meyham-e Sofla | Meymanatabad | Meymunabad | Mianeh | Midul | Mik | Mir Deh | Mir Hesam | Mir Said | Mir Yusof-e Olya | Mir Yusof-e Sofla | Mirabad | Mirabad | Mirabad-e Olya | Mirabad-e Sofla | Mirak | Miraki | Mirgah Naqshineh | Mirgah-e Derizh | Mirgasar | Mishiab | Misurab | Mitu | Mobarakabad | Mobarakabad-e Kalleh Rash | Mobarakabad-e Sepidar | Moghanlu | Mohammad Aliabad | Mohammadabad | Mohammadabad-e Ali Akbar Khan | Mohammadabad-e Kareyan | Mohammadabad-e Kharzeh | Mohammadabad-e Nil | Mohammadeh | Moinabad | Moinabad | Mojaseh | Mokhvor | Mollasalar | Morad Qoli | Moradabad | Morvarid | Moshir Aba-ye Panjeh | Moshirabad-e Owriyeh | Mozaffarabad | Muchesh | Mudi | Mukeh | Mulanabad | Mulinan | Musek | Muyneh

=== N ===
Nabiabad | Nachi | Naisar | Najafabad | Najafabad | Najafabad | Naji | Najneh-ye Olya | Najneh-ye Sofla | Nal Shekan | Namazgah | Nameh Shir | Nanaleh | Naneh | Nanur | Naran | Narenjak | Nargesleh | Nasanar | Naserabad | Nasl | Nav | Naveh | Nazemabad | Nedri | Negarestan | Negel | Nematabad | Nesareh-ye Olya | Nesareh-ye Sofla | Neshkash | Ney Band | Ney Dar | Ney | Neyzal | Neyzeh Rud | Nezaz | Nezhmar | Nezhu | Niabad | Niaz Bolagh | Niaz | Nirvan | Niyar | Noshur-e Olya | Noshur-e Sofla | Noshur-e Vosta | Nosratabad | Nosratabad | Novin | Now Bahar | Now Bahar | Nowbahar | Nowdeh | Nowgaran | Nowshad | Nur Mohammad Kandi | Nurabad | Nureh

=== O ===
Omarshal | Oshtorabad | Oskol-e Sofla | Owch Bolagh | Owch Gol | Owch Gonbad-e Khan | Owch Gonbad-e Soltan | Owghal | Owriyeh

=== P ===
Pacheh Sur | Pahneh Bor | Palangan | Paniran | Panjeh-ye Olya | Panjeh-ye Sofla | Papaleh | Parsanian | Parsheh | Partaleh | Pashabad | Patli Dar | Paygelan | Pelyandar | Peyavin | Peychun | Pileh | Pir Amran | Pir Baba Ali | Pir Bagh | Pir Khezran | Pir Meqdar | Pir Safa | Pir Soleyman | Pir Taj | Pir Yunes | Polu Sarkan | Polureh | Posht Tang | Poshteh

=== Q ===
Qaba Sorkh | Qabaghlu | Qabgholucheh | Qachian | Qader Marz | Qaderabad | Qaderabad | Qadim Khan | Qahrabad | Qahrabad-e Olya | Qahrabad-e Sofla | Qahrabad-e Soleyman | Qahreman | Qai Bard | Qalandar | Qalateh Rashkeh | Qaleh Fulad | Qaleh Gah | Qaleh Gah | Qaleh Gah | Qaleh Gah | Qaleh Gah-e Kurkur | Qaleh Gah-e Sharif | Qaleh Jeqeh-ye Sofla | Qaleh Jeqqeh | Qaleh Ji | Qaleh Joqeh | Qaleh Joqeh | Qaleh Juq | Qaleh Kohneh | Qaleh Kohneh | Qaleh Kohneh | Qaleh Rutaleh | Qaleh Sheykhan | Qaleh Valianeh | Qaleh | Qalehgah-e Gudarz | Qaleh-ye Kumain | Qaleh-ye Reyhaneh | Qalujeh | Qalvazeh | Qameshlu | Qamishaleh | Qamishleh | Qamishleh | Qamlu | Qaplan Tu | Qaqolabad | Qar | Qara Tavareh | Qarachiqran | Qaraghol | Qaragol | Qarah Bolagh | Qarah Bolagh | Qarah Bolagh-e Khan | Qarah Bolagh-e Miankuh | Qarah Bolagh-e Panjeh | Qarah Char | Qarah Darreh | Qarah Gheybi | Qarah Gol | Qarah Guyoz | Qarah Nav | Qarah Palchuq | Qarah Qayeh | Qarajalu | Qaratureh | Qareh Baghreh | Qareh Darband | Qareh Mohammadlu | Qasemabad | Qasemabad-e Veynesar | Qashoq | Qaslan | Qasrian | Qatavand | Qatlu | Qaurmeh Darreh | Qavshoq | Qazan Qarah | Qazanta | Qazi Jub | Qazi Khan | Qazi Qushchi | Qebleh Bolaghi | Qeran | Qerekhlar | Qeru Chay | Qeshlaq Pol | Qeshlaq Reza | Qeshlaq Sorkheh | Qeshlaq-e Afghanan | Qeshlaq-e Aqa Gureh | Qeshlaq-e Hasan Khan | Qeshlaq-e Khoda Karam | Qeshlaq-e Meleh | Qeshlaq-e Molla | Qeshlaq-e Nowruz | Qeshlaq-e Qazi | Qeshlaq-e Saleh Beyg | Qeshlaq-e Sefid | Qeshlaqlu | Qeytas | Qezel Aghaj | Qezel Ali | Qezel Bolagh | Qezel Bolagh | Qezel Kand-e Olya | Qezel Kand-e Sofla | Qezel Tappeh | Qezeljeh Kand | Qezeljeh | Qezgeh | Qilsun | Qinarjeh | Qojer | Qojur | Qoliabad | Qolqoleh | Qolqoleh | Qolqoleh | Qolqoleh-ye Chatan | Qolyan | Qomchian | Qomchoqay | Qomdarreh | Qorveh | Qorveh Industrial Estate | Qu Cham | Quchaq | Quchaq | Qujaq | Qukh | Qul Estar | Qureh Darreh | Qureq | Quri Chay | Quri Chay | Quridar | Qurt Darreh

=== R ===
Rahimabad | Rahim-e Kuzhiag | Rahmatabad | Ramesht | Ramol | Rangeh Rizhan | Rasheh Deh | Rashid Qaleh | Rashidabad | Rashki | Rashnash | Ravar | Razab | Rezaabad | Ri Vari | Rikhalan | Rostam Kandi | Rostaman

=== S ===
Sabadlu | Sad Bar | Sad Talvar | Sad va Soleyman | Sadabad | Sadabad | Sad-e Gaveshan | Sad-e Zarivar | Sadeqabad | Sadeqabad | Sadeqabad | Saheb | Saidabad | Sakeneh | Salamatabad | Salarabad | Salasi Olya | Salasi Sofla | Salavatabad | Salavatabad | Saleh | Salehabad | Salehabad | Salehabad | Salian | Saluk-e Olya | Saluk-e Sofla | Samuridar | Sanandaj | Sanandaj Airport | Sanandaj Industrial Estate Number 1 | Sanandaj-e Do Industrial Estate | Sanduqabad | Sang Sefid | Sang-e Sefid | Sang-e Sefid | Sanginabad | Santeh | Saqqez | Saqqez Industrial Estate | Sar Cham | Sar Cheshmeh | Sar Darreh | Sar Huyeh | Sar Kal | Sar Nezhmar | Sar Panbeh Dul | Sar Qaleh | Sar Riz | Sar Seyf | Sar Sunj | Sar Takaltu | Sara | Sarab Qamish | Sarab | Sarab-e Bayanchqolu | Sarab-e Dowkal | Sarab-e Hajji Pamoq | Sarab-e Kam | Sarab-e Mirza | Sarab-e Qaht | Sarab-e Qarah Khan | Sarab-e Shahrak-e Olya | Sarab-e Sheykh Hasan | Sarab-e-Sureh | Sarbard | Sarbenav | Sarchi | Sardav | Sardush | Sarkal | Sarkariz | Sarpir | Sarqal | Sarqul | Sarsul | Sartazin | Sartekeh-ye Olya | Sartekeh-ye Sofla | Sartipabad | Sarumal | Sarvabad | Sarvaleh | Satiar | Satileh | Savan | Savarian | Saviru | Savji | Sefid Bon | Sefid Kamareh | Seh Piran | Sehtapan | Selin | Selseleh | Seman | Semiran | Sepidareh | Serenj Dakh | Serenjianeh | Serenjianeh Olya | Serenjianeh Sofla | Serishabad | Seydan | Seyf Ali Kandi | Seyf Taleh | Seyfabad | Seyfabad | Seyf-e Olya | Seyf-e Sofla | Seylab | Seyyed Hoseyn | Seyyed Sarem | Seyyedabad-e Jamian | Seyyedan | Shabani | Shadbolaghi | Shadiabad | Shah Godar-e Sofla | Shah Jub | Shah Vali | Shahab ol Din | Shahabiyeh | Shahidar | Shahinan | Shahini | Shahrak | Shahrak-e Hejrat | Shahrak-e Sofla | Shahrak-e Vahdat | Shahsavar | Shali Shal | Shamseh | Shaneshin | Shanureh | Shaquyaf | Sharani | Sharegeh | Shargeh | Sharif Kandi | Sharifabad | Sharifabad | Sharifabad | Shasheh | Shebertu | Shekar Bolagh | Sheykh Attar | Sheykh Besharat | Sheykh Chupan | Sheykh Heydar | Sheykh Jafar | Sheykh Rash | Sheykh Sharbati | Sheykh Taqqeh | Sheykh Vajim | Sheykhaleh | Sheykheh Kureh | Shian | Shilan | Shilanabad | Shilman | Shineh | Shineh-ye Sharifabad | Shipanju | Shir Kosh-e Olya | Shir Kosh-e Sofla | Shirin Bolagh | Shirvaneh | Shirvaneh | Shivah Tu | Shojaabad | Shokuhabad | Shotor Mol | Shur Ab-e Hezareh | Shurab Khan | Shurab-e Hajji | Shushtari | Shuy | Shuyesheh | Si va Seh Mardeh | Sia Saran-e Olya | Sia Saran-e Sofla | Siah Dar-e Kohneh | Siah Dar-e Olya | Siah Darreh | Siahumeh | Siahumeh-ye Kohneh | Sianav | Sianav | Sianezar | Sichan | Sir-e Olya | Sir-e Sofla | Sirlan | Sis | Sisarak | Sivar | Sivech-e Olya | Sivech-e Sofla | Siviyeh | Siyuri | Soleyman Kandi | Soltanabad | Soltanabad-e Chetaq | Soltanabad-e Darreh Viran | Soltanabad-e Qezel Tappeh | Somaqan | Somaqlu | Sorkh Musa | Sorkheh Dezaj | Sorkheh Jub | Sorkheh Tut | Su Tappeh | Su | Sufi Baleh | Sufian | Sulakan | Sulaymaniyah | Suleh | Sunaj | Sunj | Sural | Surav | Sureh Tu | Surehban | Surehvan | Surin | Surkul | Suteh | Sutu

=== T ===
Tabisheh | Tabriz Khatun | Taftileh | Tahabad-e Jameh Shuran | Taher Baghdeh | Tahmasb Qoli | Tahmures | Taineh | Takhan | Takht | Takht-e Zangi | Takhteh | Takyeh-ye Olya | Takyeh-ye Sofla | Taleh Jar | Taleh Varan | Tamber Beyg | Tamugheh | Tamuteh | Tang Bagh | Tangi Sar | Tangivar | Tappeh Mohammadi | Taqiabad | Tarkhanabad | Tarkhanabad | Tateh Rashid | Tavakkol | Tavakkolan | Tavankesh | Tay | Tazeh Kand-e Madan | Tazehabad Duleh Rash | Tazehabad Kikhosrow | Tazehabad Sufi Baleh | Tazehabad | Tazehabad | Tazehabad | Tazehabad | Tazehabad | Tazehabad-e Amin | Tazehabad-e Asef | Tazehabad-e Bozon Qaran | Tazehabad-e Doktor Vase | Tazehabad-e Doveyseh | Tazehabad-e Dulkoru | Tazehabad-e Galaneh | Tazehabad-e Gavmishan | Tazehabad-e Hijan | Tazehabad-e Isaabad | Tazehabad-e Karimabad | Tazehabad-e Maran | Tazehabad-e Qaleh Juq | Tazehabad-e Qaragol | Tazehabad-e Qazi Ali | Tazehabad-e Qeruchay | Tazehabad-e Sar Dalan | Tazehabad-e Sar Owriyeh | Tazehabad-e Sarab-e Qaht | Tazehabad-e Tahmasbqoli | Tazehabad-e Tefli | Tazehabad-e Vazir | Tazhan | Tazhban | Tefin | Tefli | Tegerbari | Tekeyeh-ye Hashmiz | Tekiyeh | Telvar | Teynal | Teytaq | Tikanlu | Tilakuh | Tilku | Tilkuh | Timan Qaleh | Tirgaran | Tizabad | Tizh Tizh | Toraq Tappeh | Torjan | Tubreh Riz | Tubreh Riz | Tudar-e Molla | Tudar-e Ruteh | Tudar-e Samadi | Tughan-e Baba Gorgor | Tumar Qamish | Tup Aghaj | Turivar | Tut Sorkhan | Tutun Darreh

=== U ===
Uraman Takht

=== V ===
Val | Vali Beyg | Valiabad | Valiabad | Vanderni-ye Olya | Vanderni-ye Sofla | Vanineh-ye Olya | Vanineh-ye Sofla | Vargah Vir | Varmahang | Varmakan | Varu | Vashtarmal | Vasi-ye Olya | Vasi-ye Sofla | Vasneh | Vaysian | Vazheh | Vazir | Vazman | Vazmaneh-ye Olya | Vey Nesar | Veyhaj | Veys Morid | Veyseh | Vezman | Vezmeleh | Vezmeleh | Vileh | Visak | Visar | Volahzhir | Voshkalan

=== Y ===
Yaghvasi | Yakhteh Khan | Yalghuz Aghaj | Yaminan-e Olya | Yaminan-e Sofla | Yangi Arakh | Yangijeh | Yapal | Yaqubabad | Yasukand | Yazi Bolaghi | Yazi Bolaghi | Yengi Arkh | Yengi Kand | Yengi Kand | Yengiabad | Yengikand | Yunesabad | Yurqol | Yusofabad | Yuzbashi Kandi | Yuzhenan | Yuzidar

=== Z ===
Zafarabad | Zafarabad | Zagheh Fulad | Zagheh | Zagheh-ye Olya | Zagheh-ye Sofla | Zakarian | Zaki Beyg-e Olya | Zaki Beyg-e Sofla | Zali | Zalkeh | Zalkeh | Zamenabad | Zandan | Zangabad | Zanuri | Zarboneh | Zardak | Zardeh Kamar | Zarrin Jub | Zarrin Jub | Zarrinabad | Zarrinabad | Zarrineh | Zarrineh | Zarrineh-ye Varmazyar | Zarvan | Zarvav-e Olya | Zarvav-e Sofla | Zeynal Khan | Zeynal | Zhan | Zhenin | Zherizhah | Zhivar | Ziveh | Ziviyeh | Ziviyeh | Ziviyeh | Ziviyeh | Zolfileh | Zovenj | Zoviran | Zum
