= Gili Karan =

Gili Karan گيلي كران
- Village
- Location within Iran
- Coordinates: 35°39′22″N 46°23′35″E
- Country: Iran
- Province: Kurdistan
- County: Marivan
- Bakhsh: Sarshiv
- Rural District: Sarshiv

Population (2006)
  - Total: 316
- Time zone: UTC+3:30 (IRST)
  - Summer (DST): UTC+4:30 (IRDT)

Gili Karan (Persian: گيلي كران, also Romanized as Gīlī Karān and Geylī Karān; also known as Gailikarān, Gelīkarān, Gili Garan, Golī Garān, Kailigiran, and Kīlī Karān) is a village in Sarshiv Rural District, Sarshiv District, Marivan County, Kurdistan Province, Iran. At the 2006 census, its population was 316, in 65 families. The village is populated by Kurds.
