= Parsanian =

Parsanian پارسانيان
- Village
- Location within Iran
- Coordinates: 36°10′59″N 46°38′41″E
- Country: Iran
- Province: Kurdistan
- County: Saqqez
- Bakhsh: Ziviyeh
- Rural District: Emam

Population (2006)
  - Total: 332
- Time zone: UTC+3:30 (IRST)
  - Summer (DST): UTC+4:30 (IRDT)

Parsanian (Persian: پارسانيان, also Romanized as Pārsānīān) is a village in Emam Rural District, Ziviyeh District, Saqqez County, Kurdistan Province, Iran. At the 2006 census, its population was 332, in 60 families. The village is populated by Kurds.
