= Kureh Darreh-ye Olya =

Kureh Darreh-ye Olya كوره دره عليا
- Village
- Location within Iran
- Coordinates: 34°52′39″N 46°47′16″E
- Country: Iran
- Province: Kurdistan
- County: Kamyaran
- Bakhsh: Central
- Rural District: Zhavehrud

Population (2006)
  - Total: 176
- Time zone: UTC+3:30 (IRST)
  - Summer (DST): UTC+4:30 (IRDT)

Kureh Darreh-ye Olya (Persian: كوره دره عليا, also Romanized as Kūreh Darreh-ye ‘Olyā; also known as Kūreh Darreh-ye Bālā) is a village in Zhavehrud Rural District, in the Central District of Kamyaran County, Kurdistan Province, Iran. At the 2006 census, its population was 176, in 38 families. The village is populated by Kurds.
