= Kani Kharrat =

Kani Kharrat كاني خراط
- Village
- Location within Iran
- Coordinates: 35°53′00″N 45°54′00″E
- Country: Iran
- Province: Kurdistan
- County: Baneh
- Bakhsh: Nanur
- Rural District: Buin

Population (2006)
  - Total: 40
- Time zone: UTC+3:30 (IRST)
  - Summer (DST): UTC+4:30 (IRDT)

Kani Kharrat (Persian: كاني خراط, also Romanized as Kānī Kharrāţ) is a village in Buin Rural District, Nanur District, Baneh County, Kurdistan Province, Iran. At the 2006 census, its population was 40, in 7 families. The village is populated by Kurds.
