= Dowlatkand =

Dowlatkand دولت كند
- Village
- Location within Iran
- Coordinates: 35°58′11″N 47°46′42″E
- Country: Iran
- Province: Kurdistan
- County: Bijar
- Bakhsh: Central
- Rural District: Khvor Khvoreh

Population (2006)
  - Total: 119
- Time zone: UTC+3:30 (IRST)
  - Summer (DST): UTC+4:30 (IRDT)

Dowlatkand (Persian: دولت كند; also known as Dowlatshāh) is a village in Khvor Khvoreh Rural District, in the Central District of Bijar County, Kurdistan Province, Iran. At the 2006 census, its population was 119, in 24 families. The village is populated by Azerbaijanis.
