= Mirgasar =

Mirgasar ميرگسار
- Village
- Location within Iran
- Coordinates: 35°01′20″N 46°43′20″E
- Country: Iran
- Province: Kurdistan
- County: Kamyaran
- Bakhsh: Central
- Rural District: Zhavehrud

Population (2006)
  - Total: 194
- Time zone: UTC+3:30 (IRST)
  - Summer (DST): UTC+4:30 (IRDT)

Mirgasar (Persian: ميرگسار, also Romanized as Mīrgasār, Mīr Gasār, and Mīr Gosār; also known as Mīr ‘Aşşār and Mīr Jāsar) is a village in Zhavehrud Rural District, in the Central District of Kamyaran County, Kurdistan Province, Iran. At the 2006 census, its population was 194, in 41 families. The village is populated by Kurds.
