= Toraq Tappeh =

Toraq Tappeh تراق تپه
- Village
- Location within Iran
- Coordinates: 35°42′29″N 46°26′08″E
- Country: Iran
- Province: Kurdistan
- County: Marivan
- Bakhsh: Sarshiv
- Rural District: Sarshiv

Population (2006)
  - Total: 271
- Time zone: UTC+3:30 (IRST)
  - Summer (DST): UTC+4:30 (IRDT)

Toraq Tappeh (Persian: تراق تپه, also Romanized as Ţorāq Tappeh; also known as Tūrakh Tappeh and Turākhtepe) is a village in Sarshiv Rural District, Sarshiv District, Marivan County, Kurdistan Province, Iran. At the 2006 census, its population was 271, in 51 families. The village is populated by Kurds.
