= Darreh Nakhi =

Darreh Nakhi دره ناخی
- Village
- Location within Iran
- Coordinates: 35°23′31″N 46°14′08″E
- Country: Iran
- Province: Kurdistan
- County: Sarvabad
- Bakhsh: Central
- Rural District: Dezli

Population (2006)
  - Total: 529
- Time zone: UTC+3:30 (IRST)
  - Summer (DST): UTC+4:30 (IRDT)

Darreh Nakhi (Persian: دره ناخی, also Romanized as Darreh Nākhī, Darreh Nakhī, and Darreh-ye Nākhī; also known as Darreh Nākheh) is a village in Dezli Rural District, in the Central District of Sarvabad County, Kurdistan Province, Iran. At the 2006 census, its population was 529, in 118 families. The village is populated by Kurds.
