= Tavakkolan =

Tavakkolan توكلان
- Village
- Location within Iran
- Coordinates: 35°51′01″N 46°38′33″E
- Country: Iran
- Province: Kurdistan
- County: Divandarreh
- Bakhsh: Central
- Rural District: Chehel Cheshmeh

Population (2006)
  - Total: 351
- Time zone: UTC+3:30 (IRST)
  - Summer (DST): UTC+4:30 (IRDT)

Tavakkolan (Persian: توكلان, also Romanized as Tavakkolān and Taukalān; also known as Tavikalān) is a village in Chehel Cheshmeh Rural District, in the Central District of Divandarreh County, Kurdistan Province, Iran. At the 2006 census, its population was 351, in 60 families. The village is populated by Kurds.
