= Habaki =

Habaki هبكي
- Village
- Location within Iran
- Coordinates: 36°20′45″N 46°06′57″E
- Country: Iran
- Province: Kurdistan
- County: Saqqez
- Bakhsh: Central
- Rural District: Sara

Population (2006)
  - Total: 201
- Time zone: UTC+3:30 (IRST)
  - Summer (DST): UTC+4:30 (IRDT)

Habaki (Persian: هبكي, also Romanized as Habakī) is a village in Sara Rural District, in the Central District of Saqqez County, Kurdistan province, Iran. At the 2006 census, its population was 201, in 43 families. The village is populated by Kurds.
