= Sheykheh Kureh =

Sheykheh Kureh شيخه كوره
- Village
- Location within Iran
- Coordinates: 35°26′13″N 46°18′54″E
- Country: Iran
- Province: Kurdistan
- County: Marivan
- Bakhsh: Central
- Rural District: Sarkal

Population (2006)
  - Total: 191
- Time zone: UTC+3:30 (IRST)
  - Summer (DST): UTC+4:30 (IRDT)

Sheykheh Kureh (Persian: شيخه كوره, also Romanized as Sheykheh Kūreh; also known as Shaikh Kuwaireh, Sheikh Kooreh, Sheykheh Kōreh, Sheykheh Koveyreh, Sheykh Khowreh, and Sheykh Kūreh) is a village in Sarkal Rural District, in the Central District of Marivan County, Kurdistan Province, Iran. At the 2006 census, its population was 191, in 42 families. The village is populated by Kurds.
