= Rangeh Rizhan =

Rangeh Rizhan رنگه ريژان
- Village
- Location within Iran
- Coordinates: 36°03′06″N 46°20′23″E
- Country: Iran
- Province: Kurdistan
- County: Saqqez
- Bakhsh: Sarshiv
- Rural District: Zu ol Faqr

Population (2006)
  - Total: 400
- Time zone: UTC+3:30 (IRST)
  - Summer (DST): UTC+4:30 (IRDT)

Rangeh Rizhan (Persian: رنگه ريژان, also Romanized as Rangeh Rīzhān) is a village in Zu ol Faqr Rural District, Sarshiv District, Saqqez County, Kurdistan Province, Iran. At the 2006 census, its population was 400, in 71 families. The village is populated by Kurds.
