= Bakhleh =

Bakhleh باخله
- Village
- Location within Iran
- Coordinates: 34°50′37″N 46°56′59″E
- Country: Iran
- Province: Kurdistan
- County: Kamyaran
- Bakhsh: Central
- Rural District: Bilavar

Population (2006)
  - Total: 155
- Time zone: UTC+3:30 (IRST)
  - Summer (DST): UTC+4:30 (IRDT)

Bakhleh (Persian: باخله, also Romanized as Bākhleh) is a village in Bilavar Rural District, in the Central District of Kamyaran County, Kurdistan Province, Iran. At the 2006 census, its population was 155, in 36 families. The village is populated by Kurds.
