= Sakeneh =

Sakeneh ساكنه
- Village
- Location within Iran
- Coordinates: 34°47′07″N 47°01′25″E
- Country: Iran
- Province: Kurdistan
- County: Kamyaran
- Bakhsh: Central
- Rural District: Bilavar

Population (2006)
  - Total: 87
- Time zone: UTC+3:30 (IRST)
  - Summer (DST): UTC+4:30 (IRDT)

Sakeneh (Persian: ساكنه, also Romanized as Sākeneh) is a village in Bilavar Rural District, in the Central District of Kamyaran County, Kurdistan Province, Iran. At the 2006 census, its population was 87, in 20 families. The village is populated by Kurds.
