= Kani Moshkan =

Kani Moshkan كاني مشكان
- Village
- Location within Iran
- Coordinates: 35°14′18″N 46°55′18″E
- Country: Iran
- Province: Kurdistan
- County: Sanandaj
- Bakhsh: Central
- Rural District: Abidar

Population (2006)
  - Total: 365
- Time zone: UTC+3:30 (IRST)
  - Summer (DST): UTC+4:30 (IRDT)

Kani Moshkan (Persian: كاني مشكان, also Romanized as Kānī Moshkān and Kānī Meshkān; also known as Kani Mizhgān, Kānī Moshgān, and Kānī Meshgān) is a village in Abidar Rural District, in the Central District of Sanandaj County, Kurdistan Province, Iran. At the 2006 census, its population was 365, in 96 families. The village is populated by Kurds.
