= Sarqul =

Sarqul سرقول
- Village
- Location within Iran
- Coordinates: 36°03′21″N 45°50′34″E
- Country: Iran
- Province: Kurdistan
- County: Baneh
- Bakhsh: Central
- Rural District: Shuy

Population (2006)
  - Total: 55
- Time zone: UTC+3:30 (IRST)
  - Summer (DST): UTC+4:30 (IRDT)

Sarqul (Persian: سرقول, also Romanized as Sarqūl) is a village in Shuy Rural District, in the Central District of Baneh County, Kurdistan Province, Iran. At the 2006 census, its population was 55, in 10 families. The village is populated by Kurds.
