= Rasheh Deh =

Rasheh Deh رشه ده
- Village
- Location within Iran
- Coordinates: 35°34′07″N 46°14′44″E
- Country: Iran
- Province: Kurdistan
- County: Marivan
- Bakhsh: Central
- Rural District: Sarkal

Population (2006)
  - Total: 583
- Time zone: UTC+3:30 (IRST)
  - Summer (DST): UTC+4:30 (IRDT)

Rasheh Deh (Persian: رشه ده, also Romanized as Rashah Deh) is a village in Sarkal Rural District, in the Central District of Marivan County, Kurdistan Province, Iran. At the 2006 census, its population was 583, in 119 families. The village is populated by Kurds.
