= Zoviran =

Zoviran زويران
- Village
- Location within Iran
- Coordinates: 35°36′46″N 46°25′24″E
- Country: Iran
- Province: Kurdistan
- County: Marivan
- Bakhsh: Sarshiv
- Rural District: Sarshiv

Population (2006)
  - Total: 195
- Time zone: UTC+3:30 (IRST)
  - Summer (DST): UTC+4:30 (IRDT)

Zoviran (Persian: زويران, also Romanized as Zovīrān and Zoveyrān; also known as Zeverān and Zūwaīrān) is a village in Sarshiv Rural District, Sarshiv District, Marivan County, Kurdistan Province, Iran. At the 2006 census, its population was 195, in 40 families. The village is populated by Kurds.
