= Nezhmar =

Nezhmar نژمار
- Village
- Location within Iran
- Coordinates: 35°25′54″N 46°13′32″E
- Country: Iran
- Province: Kurdistan
- County: Marivan
- Bakhsh: Central
- Rural District: Sarkal

Population (2006)
  - Total: 1,067
- Time zone: UTC+3:30 (IRST)
  - Summer (DST): UTC+4:30 (IRDT)

Nezhmar (Persian: نژمار, also Romanized as Nezhmār; also known as Nijmār) is a village in Sarkal Rural District, in the Central District of Marivan County, Kurdistan Province, Iran. At the 2006 census, its population was 1,067, in 239 families. The village is populated by Kurds.
