= Yapal =

Yapal ياپل
- Village
- Location within Iran
- Coordinates: 35°56′04″N 46°46′29″E
- Country: Iran
- Province: Kurdistan
- County: Divandarreh
- Bakhsh: Central
- Rural District: Chehel Cheshmeh

Population (2006)
  - Total: 652
- Time zone: UTC+3:30 (IRST)
  - Summer (DST): UTC+4:30 (IRDT)

Yapal (Persian: ياپل, also Romanized as Yāpal and Yāpāl; also known as Vāpal) is a village in Chehel Cheshmeh Rural District, in the Central District of Divandarreh County, Kurdistan Province, Iran. At the 2006 census, its population was 652, in 126 families. The village is populated by Kurds.
