= Baraqu =

Baraqu برقرو
- Village
- Location within Iran
- Coordinates: 35°16′36″N 46°29′08″E
- Country: Iran
- Province: Kurdistan
- County: Sanandaj
- Bakhsh: Kalatrazan
- Rural District: Negel

Population (2006)
  - Total: 759
- Time zone: UTC+3:30 (IRST)
  - Summer (DST): UTC+4:30 (IRDT)

Baraqu (Persian: برقرو, also Romanized as Baraqū; also known as Barghroo, Barkarū, Barqarū, Barqrau, and Barqrū) is a village in Negel Rural District, Kalatrazan District, Sanandaj County, Kurdistan Province, Iran. At the 2006 census, its population was 759, in 189 families. The village is populated by Kurds.
