= Charkheh Bayan =

Charkheh Bayan چرخه بيان
- Village
- Location within Iran
- Coordinates: 35°22′52″N 47°13′30″E
- Country: Iran
- Province: Kurdistan
- County: Dehgolan
- Bakhsh: Central
- Rural District: Quri Chay

Population (2006)
  - Total: 137
- Time zone: UTC+3:30 (IRST)
  - Summer (DST): UTC+4:30 (IRDT)

Charkheh Bayan (Persian: چرخه بيان, also Romanized as Charkheh Bayān, Charkheh Beyān, Charkheh Biyān, and Charkheh-ye Bayān) is a village in Quri Chay Rural District, in the Central District of Dehgolan County, Kurdistan Province, Iran. At the 2006 census, its population was 137, in 36 families. The village is populated by Kurds.
