= Dul Bagh =

Dul Bagh دول باغ
- Village
- Location within Iran
- Coordinates: 35°06′37″N 46°56′01″E
- Country: Iran
- Province: Kurdistan
- County: Sanandaj
- Bakhsh: Central
- Rural District: Naran

Population (2006)
  - Total: 20
- Time zone: UTC+3:30 (IRST)
  - Summer (DST): UTC+4:30 (IRDT)

Dul Bagh (Persian: دول باغ, also Romanized as Dūl Bāgh) is a village in Naran Rural District, in the Central District of Sanandaj County, Kurdistan Province, Iran. At the 2006 census, its population was 20, in 5 families. The village is populated by Kurds.
