= Kani Seyyed Morad =

Kani Seyyed Morad كاني سيدمراد
- Village
- Location within Iran
- Coordinates: 35°50′49″N 46°48′49″E
- Country: Iran
- Province: Kurdistan
- County: Divandarreh
- Bakhsh: Saral
- Rural District: Saral

Population (2006)
  - Total: 128
- Time zone: UTC+3:30 (IRST)
  - Summer (DST): UTC+4:30 (IRDT)

Kani Seyyed Morad (Persian: كاني سيدمراد, also Romanized as Kānī Seyyed Morād; also known as Kānī Şeyd Morād) is a village in Saral Rural District, Saral District, Divandarreh County, Kurdistan Province, Iran. At the 2006 census, its population was 128, in 26 families. The village is populated by Kurds.
