= Amirabad-e Qaleh Lan =

Amirabad-e Qaleh Lan امير آباد قلعه لان
- Village
- Location within Iran
- Coordinates: 35°06′08″N 47°38′06″E
- Country: Iran
- Province: Kurdistan
- County: Qorveh
- Bakhsh: Central
- Rural District: Panjeh Ali-ye Jonubi

Population (2006)
  - Total: 259
- Time zone: UTC+3:30 (IRST)
  - Summer (DST): UTC+4:30 (IRDT)

Amirabad-e Qaleh Lan (Persian: امير آباد قلعه لان, also Romanized as Amīrābād-e Qal‘eh Lān and Amīrābād-e Qal‘ehlān; also known as Kalīlān, Qala‘lān, Qal‘ehlān, Qal‘eh-ye Lān, and Qal‘elān) is a village in Panjeh Ali-ye Jonubi Rural District, in the Central District of Qorveh County, Kurdistan Province, Iran. At the 2006 census, its population was 259, in 53 families. The village is populated by Kurds.
