= Haneh Gelan =

Haneh Gelan هانه گلان
- Village
- Location within Iran
- Coordinates: 35°36′01″N 46°48′46″E
- Country: Iran
- Province: Kurdistan
- County: Sanandaj
- Bakhsh: Central
- Rural District: Sarab Qamish

Population (2006)
  - Total: 105
- Time zone: UTC+3:30 (IRST)
  - Summer (DST): UTC+4:30 (IRDT)

Haneh Gelan (Persian: هانه گلان, also Romanized as Hāneh Gelān) is a village in Sarab Qamish Rural District, in the Central District of Sanandaj County, Kurdistan Province, Iran. At the 2006 census, its population was 105, in 21 families. The village is populated by Kurds.
