= Sar Seyf =

Sar Seyf سرسيف
- Village
- Location within Iran
- Coordinates: 36°06′08″N 46°19′02″E
- Country: Iran
- Province: Kurdistan
- County: Saqqez
- Bakhsh: Sarshiv
- Rural District: Zu ol Faqr

Population (2006)
  - Total: 96
- Time zone: UTC+3:30 (IRST)
  - Summer (DST): UTC+4:30 (IRDT)

Sar Seyf (Persian: سرسيف) is a village in Zu ol Faqr Rural District, Sarshiv District, Saqqez County, Kurdistan Province, Iran. At the 2006 census, its population was 96, in 15 families. The village is populated by Kurds.
