= Deyvaznav =

Deyvaznav ديوزناو
- Village
- Location within Iran
- Coordinates: 35°06′00″N 46°29′00″E
- Country: Iran
- Province: Kurdistan
- County: Sarvabad
- Bakhsh: Central
- Rural District: Zherizhah

Population (2006)
  - Total: 436
- Time zone: UTC+3:30 (IRST)
  - Summer (DST): UTC+4:30 (IRDT)

Deyvaznav (Persian: ديوزناو, also Romanized as Deyvaznāv) is a village in Zherizhah Rural District, in the Central District of Sarvabad County, Kurdistan Province, Iran. At the 2006 census, its population was 436, in 88 families. The village is populated by Kurds.
