= Polureh =

Polureh پلوره
- Village
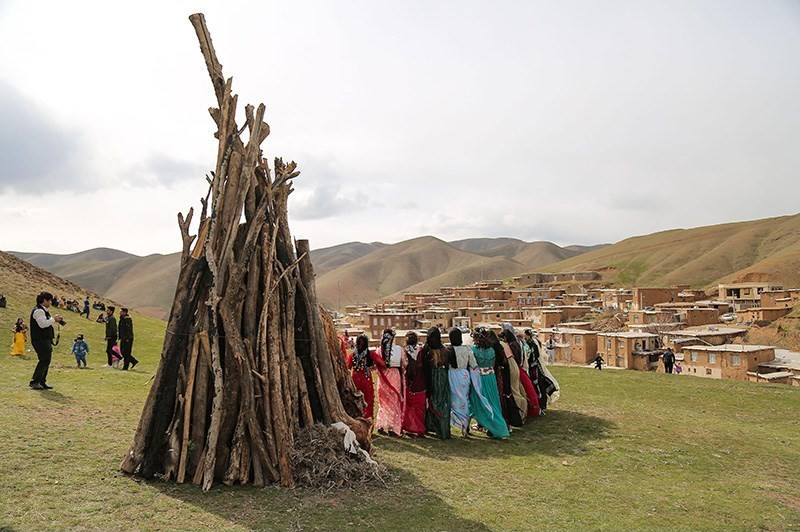
- Polureh in 2022

- Location within Iran
- Coordinates: 35°28′19″N 46°35′45″E
- Country: Iran
- Province: Kurdistan
- County: Marivan
- Bakhsh: Sarshiv
- Rural District: Gol-e Cheydar

Population (2006)
  - Total: 207
- Time zone: UTC+3:30 (IRST)
  - Summer (DST): UTC+4:30 (IRDT)

Polureh (Persian: پلوره, also Romanized as Polūreh and Pelūreh; also known as Pilureh) is a village in Gol-e Cheydar Rural District, Sarshiv District, Marivan County, Kurdistan Province, Iran. At the 2006 census, its population was 207, in 56 families. The village is populated by Kurds.
