= Taleh Varan =

Taleh Varan طاله وران
- Village
- Location within Iran
- Coordinates: 35°23′06″N 46°35′56″E
- Country: Iran
- Province: Kurdistan
- County: Sanandaj
- Bakhsh: Kalatrazan
- Rural District: Kalatrazan

Population (2006)
  - Total: 203
- Time zone: UTC+3:30 (IRST)
  - Summer (DST): UTC+4:30 (IRDT)

Taleh Varan (Persian: طاله وران, also Romanized as Ţāleh Varān; also known as Ţālvarān) is a village in Kalatrazan Rural District, Kalatrazan District, Sanandaj County, Kurdistan Province, Iran. At the 2006 census, its population was 203, in 51 families. The village is populated by Kurds.
