= Kani Niaz =

Kani Niaz کانی نیاز
- Village
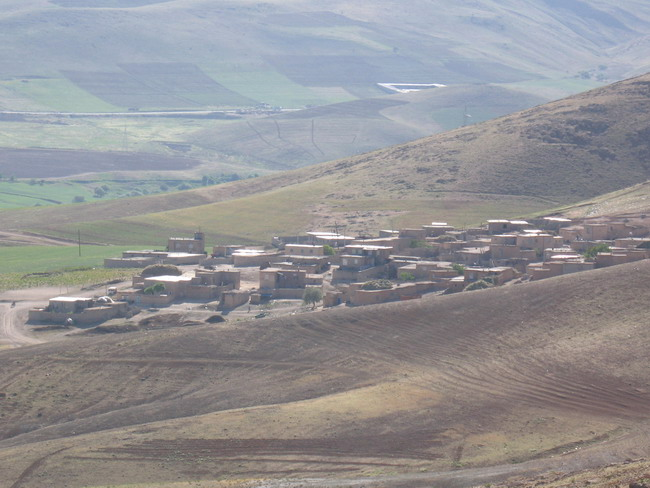

- Location within Iran
- Coordinates: 36°16′31″N 46°17′57″E
- Country: Iran
- Province: Kurdistan
- County: Saqqez
- Bakhsh: Central
- Rural District: Sara

Population (2006)
  - Total: 210
- Time zone: UTC+3:30 (IRST)
  - Summer (DST): UTC+4:30 (IRDT)

Kani Niaz (Persian: کانی نیاز, also Romanized as Kānī Nīāz) is a village in Sara Rural District, in the Central District of Saqqez County, Kurdistan Province, Iran. At the 2006 census, its population was 210, in 43 families. The village is populated by Kurds.
