= Takhan =

Takhan تخان
- Village
- Location within Iran
- Coordinates: 35°20′53″N 46°19′57″E
- Country: Iran
- Province: Kurdistan
- County: Sarvabad
- Bakhsh: Central
- Rural District: Kusalan

Population (2006)
  - Total: 254
- Time zone: UTC+3:30 (IRST)
  - Summer (DST): UTC+4:30 (IRDT)

Takhan (Persian: تخان, also Romanized as Takhān and Tekhān) is a village in Kusalan Rural District, in the Central District of Sarvabad County, Kurdistan Province, Iran. At the 2006 census, its population was 254, in 52 families. The village is populated by Kurds.
