= Darbandeh =

Darbandeh دربنده
- Village
- Location within Iran
- Coordinates: 35°14′29″N 46°56′33″E
- Country: Iran
- Province: Kurdistan
- County: Sanandaj
- Bakhsh: Central
- Rural District: Abidar

Population (2006)
  - Total: 183
- Time zone: UTC+3:30 (IRST)
  - Summer (DST): UTC+4:30 (IRDT)

Darbandeh (Persian: دربنده) is a village in Abidar Rural District, in the Central District of Sanandaj County, Kurdistan Province, Iran. At the 2006 census, its population was 183, in 45 families. The village is populated by Kurds.
