= Hashtad Joft =

Hashtad Joft هشتادجفت
- Village
- Location within Iran
- Coordinates: 36°09′59″N 47°53′20″E
- Country: Iran
- Province: Kurdistan
- County: Bijar
- Bakhsh: Korani
- Rural District: Gorgin

Population (2006)
  - Total: 114
- Time zone: UTC+3:30 (IRST)
  - Summer (DST): UTC+4:30 (IRDT)

Hashtad Joft (Persian: هشتادجفت, also Romanized as Hashtād Joft) is a village in Gorgin Rural District, Korani District, Bijar County, Kurdistan province, Iran. At the 2006 census, its population was 114, in 22 families. The village is populated by Azerbaijanis.
