= Balucheh =

Balucheh بلوچه
- Village
- Location within Iran
- Coordinates: 34°50′44″N 47°01′51″E
- Country: Iran
- Province: Kurdistan
- County: Kamyaran
- Bakhsh: Central
- Rural District: Bilavar

Population (2006)
  - Total: 176
- Time zone: UTC+3:30 (IRST)
  - Summer (DST): UTC+4:30 (IRDT)

Balucheh (Persian: بلوچه, also Romanized as Balūcheh; also known as Balūjeh) is a village in Bilavar Rural District, in the Central District of Kamyaran County, Kurdistan Province, Iran. At the 2006 census, its population was 176, in 35 families. The village is populated by Kurds.
