= Hang Chineh =

Hang Chineh هنگ چينه
- Village
- Location within Iran
- Coordinates: 35°55′24″N 46°14′55″E
- Country: Iran
- Province: Kurdistan
- County: Saqqez
- Bakhsh: Sarshiv
- Rural District: Zu ol Faqr

Population (2006)
  - Total: 106
- Time zone: UTC+3:30 (IRST)
  - Summer (DST): UTC+4:30 (IRDT)

Hang Chineh (Persian: هنگ چينه, also Romanized as Hang Chīneh, Hang-e Chīneh, and Hangachīneh; also known as Gamgachīna, Gamgachīneh, and Hangeh Chīneh) is a village in Zu ol Faqr Rural District, Sarshiv District, Saqqez County, Kurdistan Province, Iran. At the 2006 census, its population was 106, in 19 families. The village is populated by Kurds.
