= Haneh Sheykhan =

Haneh Sheykhan هانه شيخان
- Village
- Location within Iran
- Coordinates: 35°39′35″N 46°12′12″E
- Country: Iran
- Province: Kurdistan
- County: Marivan
- Bakhsh: Khav and Mirabad
- Rural District: Khav and Mirabad

Population (2006)
  - Total: 108
- Time zone: UTC+3:30 (IRST)
  - Summer (DST): UTC+4:30 (IRDT)

Haneh Sheykhan (Persian: هانه شيخان, also Romanized as Hāneh Sheykhān; also known as Hāna Shaikhān, Ḩanā Sheykhān, and Ḩanī Sheykhān) is a village in Khav and Mirabad Rural District, Khav and Mirabad District, Marivan County, Kurdistan Province, Iran. At the 2006 census, its population was 108, in 22 families. The village is populated by Kurds.
