= Teynal =

Teynal طينال
- Village
- Location within Iran
- Coordinates: 35°35′32″N 46°32′07″E
- Country: Iran
- Province: Kurdistan
- County: Marivan
- Bakhsh: Sarshiv
- Rural District: Gol-e Cheydar

Population (2006)
  - Total: 132
- Time zone: UTC+3:30 (IRST)
  - Summer (DST): UTC+4:30 (IRDT)

Teynal (Persian: طينال, also Romanized as Ţeynāl and Teynāl; also known as Tenāl) is a village in Gol-e Cheydar Rural District, Sarshiv District, Marivan County, Kurdistan Province, Iran. At the 2006 census, its population was 132, in 27 families. The village is populated by Kurds.
