= Khoshkin-e Kumasi =

Khoshkin-e Kumasi خشكين كوماسي
- Village
- Location within Iran
- Coordinates: 35°24′37″N 46°34′50″E
- Country: Iran
- Province: Kurdistan
- County: Sanandaj
- Bakhsh: Kalatrazan
- Rural District: Kalatrazan

Population (2006)
  - Total: 277
- Time zone: UTC+3:30 (IRST)
  - Summer (DST): UTC+4:30 (IRDT)

Khoshkin-e Kumasi (Persian: خشكين كوماسي, also Romanized as Khoshkīn-e Kūmāsī; also known as Khoshgīn, Khoshkīn, Vashkīn, Veshkīn, and Wiskīn) is a village in Kalatrazan Rural District, Kalatrazan District, Sanandaj County, Kurdistan Province, Iran. At the 2006 census, its population was 277, in 59 families. The village is populated by Kurds.
