= Meleh =

Meleh مله
- Village
- Location within Iran
- Coordinates: 36°03′27″N 46°25′27″E
- Country: Iran
- Province: Kurdistan
- County: Saqqez
- Bakhsh: Ziviyeh
- Rural District: Khvor Khvoreh

Population (2006)
  - Total: 252
- Time zone: UTC+3:30 (IRST)
  - Summer (DST): UTC+4:30 (IRDT)

Meleh (Persian: مله; also known as Meleh Qeshlāq) is a village in the Khvor Khvoreh Rural District, Ziviyeh District, Saqqez County, Kurdistan Province, Iran. At the time of the 2006 census, it had a population of 252 people, with 46 families. The village is populated by the Kurds.
