= Amrowleh =

Amrowleh امروله
- Village
- Location within Iran
- Coordinates: 35°36′20″N 47°15′26″E
- Country: Iran
- Province: Kurdistan
- County: Sanandaj
- Bakhsh: Central
- Rural District: Hoseynabad-e Jonubi

Population (2006)
  - Total: 345
- Time zone: UTC+3:30 (IRST)
  - Summer (DST): UTC+4:30 (IRDT)

Amrowleh (Persian: امروله, also Romanized as Amrūleh and Hmrūllah; also known as ‘Amrollāh) is a village in Hoseynabad-e Jonubi Rural District, in the Central District of Sanandaj County, Kurdistan Province, Iran. At the 2017 census, its population was 420, in 106 families. The village is populated by Kurds.
