= Rostaman =

Rostaman رستمان
- Village
- Location within Iran
- Coordinates: 36°06′33″N 46°29′57″E
- Country: Iran
- Province: Kurdistan
- County: Saqqez
- Bakhsh: Ziviyeh
- Rural District: Emam

Population (2006)
  - Total: 201
- Time zone: UTC+3:30 (IRST)
  - Summer (DST): UTC+4:30 (IRDT)

Rostaman (Persian: رستمان, also Romanized as Rostamān) is a village in Emam Rural District, Ziviyeh District, Saqqez County, Kurdistan Province, Iran. At the 2006 census, its population was 201, with 43 families. The village is populated by Kurds.
