= Kalji =

Kalji كلجي
- Village
- Location within Iran
- Coordinates: 35°11′35″N 46°20′40″E
- Country: Iran
- Province: Kurdistan
- County: Sarvabad
- Bakhsh: Uraman
- Rural District: Shalyar

Population (2006)
  - Total: 332
- Time zone: UTC+3:30 (IRST)
  - Summer (DST): UTC+4:30 (IRDT)

Kalji (Persian: كلجي, romanized: Kaljī), also known as Kalīj, Khalii, and Khalji, is a village in Shalyar Rural District, Uraman District, Sarvabad County, Kurdistan province, Iran. At the 2006 census, its population was 332, in 80 families. The village is populated by Kurds.
