= Kani Eyn Ali =

Kani Eyn Ali كاني عينعلي
- Village
- Location within Iran
- Coordinates: 35°21′51″N 47°13′44″E
- Country: Iran
- Province: Kurdistan
- County: Dehgolan
- Bakhsh: Central
- Rural District: Quri Chay

Population (2006)
  - Total: 63
- Time zone: UTC+3:30 (IRST)
  - Summer (DST): UTC+4:30 (IRDT)

Kani Eyn Ali (Persian: كاني عينعلي, also Romanized as Kānī ‘Eyn ‘Alī, Kāni ‘Ain ‘Ali, and Kānī ‘Eyn-e ‘Alī) is a village in Quri Chay Rural District, in the Central District of Dehgolan County, Kurdistan Province, Iran. At the 2006 census, its population was 63, in 17 families. The village is populated by Kurds.
