= Cheshmeh Deraz =

Cheshmeh Deraz چشمه دراز
- Village
- Location within Iran
- Coordinates: 35°32′46″N 47°25′25″E
- Country: Iran
- Province: Kurdistan
- County: Dehgolan
- Bakhsh: Central
- Rural District: Yeylan-e Shomali

Population (2006)
  - Total: 134
- Time zone: UTC+3:30 (IRST)
  - Summer (DST): UTC+4:30 (IRDT)

Cheshmeh Deraz (Persian: چشمه دراز, also Romanized as Cheshmeh Derāz and Chashmeh Derāz; also known as Kāni Darāz and Kānī Derāz) is a village in Yeylan-e Shomali Rural District, in the Central District of Dehgolan County, Kurdistan Province, Iran. At the 2006 census, its population was 134, in 28 families. The village is populated by Kurds.
