= Qarah Gheybi =

Qarah Gheybi قره غيبي
- Village
- Location within Iran
- Coordinates: 35°51′37″N 47°03′24″E
- Country: Iran
- Province: Kurdistan
- County: Divandarreh
- Bakhsh: Central
- Rural District: Howmeh

Population (2006)
  - Total: 257
- Time zone: UTC+3:30 (IRST)
  - Summer (DST): UTC+4:30 (IRDT)

Qarah Gheybi (Persian: قره غيبي, also Romanized as Qarah Gheybī and Qareh Gheybī; also known as Qara Kol) is a village in Howmeh Rural District, in the Central District of Divandarreh County, Kurdistan Province, Iran. At the 2006 census, its population was 257, in 48 families. The village is populated by Kurds.
