= Mir Said =

Mir Said ميرسعيد
- Village
- Location within Iran
- Coordinates: 36°20′51″N 46°51′19″E
- Country: Iran
- Province: Kurdistan
- County: Saqqez
- Bakhsh: Ziviyeh
- Rural District: Gol Tappeh

Population (2006)
  - Total: 113
- Time zone: UTC+3:30 (IRST)
  - Summer (DST): UTC+4:30 (IRDT)

Mir Said (Persian: ميرسعيد, also Romanized as Mīr Saʿīd; also known as Mīr Seyyed) is a village in Gol Tappeh Rural District, Ziviyeh District, Saqqez County, Kurdistan Province, Iran. At the 2006 census, its population was 113, in 20 families. The village is populated by Kurds.
