= Haft Tash =

Haft Tash هفت تاش
- Village
- Location within Iran
- Coordinates: 35°56′07″N 46°06′45″E
- Country: Iran
- Province: Kurdistan
- County: Baneh
- Bakhsh: Nanur
- Rural District: Buin

Population (2006)
  - Total: 333
- Time zone: UTC+3:30 (IRST)
  - Summer (DST): UTC+4:30 (IRDT)

Haft Tash (Persian: هفت تاش, also Romanized as Haft Tāsh; also known as Haftāsh and Haftdasht) is a village in Buin Rural District, Nanur District, Baneh County, Kurdistan Province, Iran. At the 2006 census, its population was 333, in 57 families. The village is populated by Kurds.
