= Chapan-e Sofla =

Chapan-e Sofla چاپان سفلي
- Village
- Location within Iran
- Coordinates: 36°11′15″N 46°35′36″E
- Country: Iran
- Province: Kurdistan
- County: Saqqez
- Bakhsh: Ziviyeh
- Rural District: Emam

Population (2006)
  - Total: 214
- Time zone: UTC+3:30 (IRST)
  - Summer (DST): UTC+4:30 (IRDT)

Chapan-e Sofla (Persian: چاپان سفلي, also Romanized as Chāpān-e Soflá and Chāpān Soflá; also known as Chāpān and Chāpān-e Pā’īn) is a village in Emam Rural District, Ziviyeh District, Saqqez County, Kurdistan Province, Iran. At the 2006 census, its population was 214, in 48 families. The village is populated by Kurds.
