= Khoramta =

Khoramta خرمتا
- Village
- Location within Iran
- Coordinates: 36°06′18″N 46°14′44″E
- Country: Iran
- Province: Kurdistan
- County: Saqqez
- Bakhsh: Sarshiv
- Rural District: Zu ol Faqr

Population (2006)
  - Total: 137
- Time zone: UTC+3:30 (IRST)
  - Summer (DST): UTC+4:30 (IRDT)
- Website: khoramta.blogfa.com @khoramta

Khoramta (Persian: خرمتا, also Romanized as Khoramtā) is a village in Zu ol Faqr Rural District, Sarshiv District, Saqqez County, Kurdistan province, Iran. At the 2006 census, its population was 137, in 34 families. The village is populated by Kurds.
