= Sad Talvar =

Sad Talvar سد تلوار
- Village
- Country: Iran
- Province: Kurdistan
- County: Bijar
- Bakhsh: Chang Almas
- Rural District: Pir Taj

Population (2006)
  - Total: 141
- Time zone: UTC+3:30 (IRST)
  - Summer (DST): UTC+4:30 (IRDT)

Sad Talvar (Persian: سد تلوار, also Romanized as Sad Talvār) is a village in Pir Taj Rural District, Chang Almas District, Bijar County, Kurdistan Province, Iran. At the 2006 census, its population was 141, in 11 families. The village is populated by Azerbaijanis.
