= Anjomneh =

Anjomneh انجمنه
- Village
- Location within Iran
- Coordinates: 35°21′59″N 46°21′08″E
- Country: Iran
- Province: Kurdistan
- County: Sarvabad
- Bakhsh: Central
- Rural District: Kusalan

Population (2006)
  - Total: 1,407
- Time zone: UTC+3:30 (IRST)
  - Summer (DST): UTC+4:30 (IRDT)

Anjomneh (Persian: انجمنه; also known as Anjumneh) is a village in Kusalan Rural District, in the Central District of Sarvabad County, Kurdistan Province, Iran. At the 2006 census, its population was 1,407, in 308 families. The village is populated by Kurds.
