= Tappeh Mohammadi =

Tappeh Mohammadi تپه محمدي
- Village
- Location within Iran
- Coordinates: 35°50′55″N 47°17′43″E
- Country: Iran
- Province: Kurdistan
- County: Bijar
- Bakhsh: Central
- Rural District: Najafabad

Population (2006)
  - Total: 135
- Time zone: UTC+3:30 (IRST)
  - Summer (DST): UTC+4:30 (IRDT)

Tappeh Mohammadi (Persian: تپه محمدي, also Romanized as Tappeh Moḩammadī and Tappeh-ye Moḩammadī; also known as Tabrīz Kūchak, Towbeh-ye Moḩammad, and Tūbeh Muhammad) is a village in Najafabad Rural District, in the Central District of Bijar County, Kurdistan Province, Iran. At the 2006 census, its population was 135, in 29 families. The village is populated by Kurds.
