= Ali Mardeh =

Ali Mardeh علي مرده
- Village
- Location within Iran
- Coordinates: 36°11′51″N 46°48′21″E
- Country: Iran
- Province: Kurdistan
- County: Saqqez
- Bakhsh: Ziviyeh
- Rural District: Tilakuh

Population (2006)
  - Total: 136
- Time zone: UTC+3:30 (IRST)
  - Summer (DST): UTC+4:30 (IRDT)

Ali Mardeh (Persian: علي مرده, also Romanized as ‘Alī Mardeh and ‘Alīmardeh) is a village in Tilakuh Rural District, Ziviyeh District, Saqqez County, Kurdistan Province, Iran. At the 2006 census, its population was 136, in 25 families. The village is populated by Kurds.
