= Al-e Kabud =

Al-e Kabud ْآل كبود
- Village
- Location within Iran
- Coordinates: 35°47′10″N 47°35′28″E
- Country: Iran
- Province: Kurdistan
- County: Bijar
- Bakhsh: Central
- Rural District: Howmeh

Population (2006)
  - Total: 75
- Time zone: UTC+3:30 (IRST)
  - Summer (DST): UTC+4:30 (IRDT)

Al-e Kabud (Persian: ْآل كبود, also Romanized as Āl-e Kabūd; also known as Alakabūd, Alā Kabūd, Āleh Kabūd, and Allākabūd) is a village in Howmeh Rural District, in the Central District of Bijar County, Kurdistan Province, Iran. At the 2006 census, its population was 75, in 18 families. The village is populated by Kurds.
