= Bukhlu =

Bukhlu بوخلو
- Village
- Location within Iran
- Coordinates: 35°54′38″N 46°20′38″E
- Country: Iran
- Province: Kurdistan
- County: Saqqez
- Bakhsh: Sarshiv
- Rural District: Chehel Cheshmeh-ye Gharbi

Population (2006)
  - Total: 252
- Time zone: UTC+3:30 (IRST)
  - Summer (DST): UTC+4:30 (IRDT)

Bukhlu (Persian: بوخلو, also Romanized as Būkhlū; also known as Bokhalū and Būkhalū) is a village in Chehel Cheshmeh-ye Gharbi Rural District, Sarshiv District, Saqqez County, Kurdistan Province, Iran. At the 2006 census, its population was 252, in 41 families. The village is populated by Kurds.
