= Kani Shah Qoli =

Village in Kurdistan, Iran

Kani Shah Qoli كاني شاه قلي
- Village
- Location within Iran
- Coordinates: 35°04′32″N 47°21′24″E
- Country: Iran
- Province: Kurdistan
- County: Dehgolan
- Bakhsh: Bolbanabad
- Rural District: Yeylan-e Jonubi

Population (2006)
  - Total: 122
- Time zone: UTC+3:30 (IRST)
  - Summer (DST): UTC+4:30 (IRDT)

Kani Shah Qoli (Persian: كاني شاه قلي, also Romanized as Kānī Shāh Qolī; also known as Kāni Shāh Quli, Kānī Shāqolī, and Kān Shāh Qolī) is a village in Yeylan-e Jonubi Rural District, Bolbanabad District, Dehgolan County, Kurdistan Province, Iran. At the 2006 census, its population was 122, in 28 families. The village is populated by Kurds.
