= Konamar =

Konamar كنامار
- Village
- Location within Iran
- Coordinates: 35°38′22″N 47°49′02″E
- Country: Iran
- Province: Kurdistan
- County: Bijar
- Bakhsh: Chang Almas
- Rural District: Babarashani

Population (2006)
  - Total: 110
- Time zone: UTC+3:30 (IRST)
  - Summer (DST): UTC+4:30 (IRDT)

Konamar (Persian: كنامار, also Romanized as Konāmār; also known as Kūna Mār) is a village in Babarashani Rural District, Chang Almas District, Bijar County, Kurdistan province, Iran. At the 2006 census, its population was 110, in 28 families. The village is populated by Kurds.
