= Mamuleh =

Mamuleh ماموله
- Village
- Location within Iran
- Coordinates: 35°24′57″N 46°24′56″E
- Country: Iran
- Province: Kurdistan
- County: Marivan
- Bakhsh: Central
- Rural District: Kumasi

Population (2006)
  - Total: 64
- Time zone: UTC+3:30 (IRST)
  - Summer (DST): UTC+4:30 (IRDT)

Mamuleh (Persian: ماموله, also Romanized as Māmūleh) is a village in Kumasi Rural District, in the Central District of Marivan County, Kurdistan Province, Iran. At the 2006 census, its population was 64, in 16 families. The village is populated by Kurds.
