= Sianezar =

Sianezar سيانزار
- Village
- Location within Iran
- Coordinates: 35°57′03″N 46°12′03″E
- Country: Iran
- Province: Kurdistan
- County: Saqqez
- Bakhsh: Sarshiv
- Rural District: Zu ol Faqr

Population (2006)
  - Total: 162
- Time zone: UTC+3:30 (IRST)
  - Summer (DST): UTC+4:30 (IRDT)

Sianezar (Persian: سيانزار, also Romanized as Sīānezār, Sīānzār, and Seyānzār; also known as Sīāh Nesār and Sīāhnisar) is a village in Zu ol Faqr Rural District, Sarshiv District, Saqqez County, Kurdistan Province, Iran. At the 2006 census, its population was 162, in 28 families. The village is populated by Kurds.
