= Kani Sur, Nanur =

Kani Sur كاني سور
- Village
- Location within Iran
- Coordinates: 35°51′26″N 45°56′56″E
- Country: Iran
- Province: Kurdistan
- County: Baneh
- Bakhsh: Nanur
- Rural District: Nanur

Population (2006)
  - Total: 67
- Time zone: UTC+3:30 (IRST)
  - Summer (DST): UTC+4:30 (IRDT)

Kani Sur (Persian: كاني سور, also Romanized as Kānī Sūr) is a village in Nanur Rural District, Nanur District, Baneh County, Kurdistan Province, Iran. At the 2006 census, its population was 67, in 10 families. The village is populated by Kurds.
