= Buridar =

Buridar بوری‌در
- Village
- Location within Iran
- Coordinates: 35°11′59″N 46°30′43″E
- Country: Iran
- Province: Kurdistan
- County: Sarvabad
- Bakhsh: Central
- Rural District: Paygelan

Population (2006)
  - Total: 1,182
- Time zone: UTC+3:30 (IRST)
  - Summer (DST): UTC+4:30 (IRDT)

Buridar (Persian: بوری‌در, also Romanized as Būrīdar) is a village in Paygelan Rural District, in the Central District of Sarvabad County, Kurdistan Province, Iran. At the 2006 census, its population was 1,182, in 296 families. The village is populated by Kurds.
