= Qabaghlu =

Qabaghlu قباغلو
- Village
- Location within Iran
- Coordinates: 36°10′24″N 46°10′07″E
- Country: Iran
- Province: Kurdistan
- County: Saqqez
- Bakhsh: Central
- Rural District: Tamugheh

Population (2006)
  - Total: 721
- Time zone: UTC+3:30 (IRST)
  - Summer (DST): UTC+4:30 (IRDT)

Qabaghlu (Persian: قباغلو, also Romanized as Qabāghlū) is a village in Tamugheh Rural District, in the Central District of Saqqez County, Kurdistan Province, Iran. At the 2006 census, its population was 721, in 158 families. The village is populated by Kurds.
