= Qezgeh =

Qezgeh قزگه
- Village
- Location within Iran
- Coordinates: 36°00′08″N 47°23′08″E
- Country: Iran
- Province: Kurdistan
- County: Divandarreh
- Bakhsh: Central
- Rural District: Qaratureh

Population (2006)
  - Total: 207
- Time zone: UTC+3:30 (IRST)
  - Summer (DST): UTC+4:30 (IRDT)

Qezgeh (Persian: قزگه; also known as Qezhek, Qezkeh, Qezkheh, and Qizkha) is a village in Qaratureh Rural District, in the Central District of Divandarreh County, Kurdistan Province, Iran. At the 2006 census, its population was 207, in 49 families. The village is populated by Kurds.
