= Asleh Marz =

Asleh Marz اسله مرز
- Village
- Location within Iran
- Coordinates: 35°30′09″N 47°18′03″E
- Country: Iran
- Province: Kurdistan
- County: Dehgolan
- Bakhsh: Central
- Rural District: Yeylan-e Shomali

Population (2006)
  - Total: 269
- Time zone: UTC+3:30 (IRST)
  - Summer (DST): UTC+4:30 (IRDT)

Asleh Marz (Persian: اسله مرز, also Romanized as Āsleh Marz; also known as Ālmīrza, Aslamarz, Aşlāmarz, Aslammars, Aslemarz, and Eslamarz) is a village in Yeylan-e Shomali Rural District, in the Central District of Dehgolan County, Kurdistan Province, Iran. At the 2006 census, its population was 269, in 58 families. The village is populated by Kurds.
