= Ney Dar =

Ney Dar نيدر
- Village
- Location within Iran
- Coordinates: 34°58′54″N 47°14′27″E
- Country: Iran
- Province: Kurdistan
- County: Kamyaran
- Bakhsh: Muchesh
- Rural District: Sursur

Population (2006)
  - Total: 179
- Time zone: UTC+3:30 (IRST)
  - Summer (DST): UTC+4:30 (IRDT)

Ney Dar (Persian: نيدر, also Romanized as Neydar and Naidar) is a village in Sursur Rural District, Muchesh District, Kamyaran County, Kurdistan Province, Iran. At the 2006 census, its population was 179, in 45 families. The village is populated by Kurds.
