= Serenj Dakh =

Serenj Dakh سرنجداخ
- Village
- Location within Iran
- Coordinates: 36°02′06″N 46°24′30″E
- Country: Iran
- Province: Kurdistan
- County: Saqqez
- Bakhsh: Ziviyeh
- Rural District: Khvor Khvoreh

Population (2006)
  - Total: 149
- Time zone: UTC+3:30 (IRST)
  - Summer (DST): UTC+4:30 (IRDT)

Serenj Dakh (Persian: سرنجداخ, also Romanized as Serenj Dākh; also known as Sīrīnj Dāgh) is a village in Khvor Khvoreh Rural District, Ziviyeh District, Saqqez County, Kurdistan Province, Iran. At the 2006 census, its population was 149, in 21 families. The village is populated by Kurds.
