= Mojaseh =

Mojaseh مجسه
- Village
- Location within Iran
- Coordinates: 36°00′36″N 45°56′06″E
- Country: Iran
- Province: Kurdistan
- County: Baneh
- Bakhsh: Central
- Rural District: Shuy

Population (2006)
  - Total: 143
- Time zone: UTC+3:30 (IRST)
  - Summer (DST): UTC+4:30 (IRDT)

Mojaseh (Persian: مجسه) is a village in Shuy Rural District, in the Central District of Baneh County, Kurdistan Province, Iran. At the 2006 census, its population was 143, in 27 families. The village is populated by Kurds.
