= Do Palureh =

Do Palureh دوپلوره
- Village
- Location within Iran
- Coordinates: 35°43′22″N 46°19′34″E
- Country: Iran
- Province: Kurdistan
- County: Marivan
- Bakhsh: Sarshiv
- Rural District: Sarshiv

Population (2006)
  - Total: 212
- Time zone: UTC+3:30 (IRST)
  - Summer (DST): UTC+4:30 (IRDT)

Do Palureh (Persian: دوپلوره, also Romanized as Do Palūreh, Doplūreh, Dow Palūreh, Dūpalūreh, and Dūpelūreh) is a village in Sarshiv Rural District, Sarshiv District, Marivan County, Kurdistan Province, Iran. At the 2006 census, its population was 212, in 42 families. The village is populated by Kurds.
