= Qeshlaq-e Meleh =

Qeshlaq-e Meleh قشلاق مله
- Village
- Country: Iran
- Province: Kurdistan
- County: Saqqez
- Bakhsh: Ziviyeh
- Rural District: Khvor Khvoreh

Population (2006)
  - Total: 159
- Time zone: UTC+3:30 (IRST)
  - Summer (DST): UTC+4:30 (IRDT)

Qeshlaq-e Meleh (Persian: قشلاق مله, also Romanized as Qeshlāq-e Meleh) is a village in Khvor Khvoreh Rural District, Ziviyeh District, Saqqez County, Kurdistan Province, Iran. At the 2006 census, its population was 159, in 25 families. The village is populated by Kurds.
