= Qahrabad-e Soleyman =

Qahrabad-e Soleyman قهر آباد سليمان
- Village
- Location within Iran
- Coordinates: 36°01′21″N 46°34′20″E
- Country: Iran
- Province: Kurdistan
- County: Saqqez
- Bakhsh: Ziviyeh
- Rural District: Khvor Khvoreh

Population (2006)
  - Total: 425
- Time zone: UTC+3:30 (IRST)
  - Summer (DST): UTC+4:30 (IRDT)

Qahrabad-e Soleyman (Persian: قهر آباد سليمان, also Romanized as Qahrābād-e Soleymān; also known as Qahrābād) is a village in Khvor Khvoreh Rural District, Ziviyeh District, Saqqez County, Kurdistan Province, Iran. According to the census in 2006, its population was 425, in 81 families. The village is populated by Kurds.
