= Tefin =

Village in Kurdistan, Iran

Tefin تفين
- Village
- Location within Iran
- Coordinates: 35°05′06″N 46°36′13″E
- Country: Iran
- Province: Kurdistan
- County: Sarvabad
- Bakhsh: Central
- Rural District: Zherizhah

Population (2006)
  - Total: 99
- Time zone: UTC+3:30 (IRST)
  - Summer (DST): UTC+4:30 (IRDT)

Tefin (Persian: تفين, also Romanized as Tefīn and Tafīn; also known as Tūfīn) is a village in Zherizhah Rural District, in the Central District of Sarvabad County, Kurdistan Province, Iran. At the 2006 census, its population was 99, in 29 families. The village is populated by Kurds.
