= Paniran =

Paniran پنيران
- Village
- Location within Iran
- Coordinates: 35°02′06″N 47°06′37″E
- Country: Iran
- Province: Kurdistan
- County: Kamyaran
- Bakhsh: Muchesh
- Rural District: Amirabad

Population (2006)
  - Total: 791
- Time zone: UTC+3:30 (IRST)
  - Summer (DST): UTC+4:30 (IRDT)

Paniran (Persian: پنيران, also Romanized as Panīrān) is a village in Amirabad Rural District, Muchesh District, Kamyaran County, Kurdistan Province, Iran. At the 2006 census, its population was 791, in 174 families. The village is populated by Kurds.
