= Bayanchoqlu =

Bayanchoqlu باينچقلو
- Village
- Location within Iran
- Coordinates: 35°33′07″N 47°10′06″E
- Country: Iran
- Province: Kurdistan
- County: Sanandaj
- Bakhsh: Central
- Rural District: Hoseynabad-e Jonubi

Population (2006)
  - Total: 218
- Time zone: UTC+3:30 (IRST)
  - Summer (DST): UTC+4:30 (IRDT)

Bayanchoqlu (Persian: باينچقلو, also Romanized as Bāyanchoqlū, Bāyencheqlū, and Bāyenchqolū; also known as Banch Khali, Bāyenjeqlū, and Bāyenj Qolī) is a village in Hoseynabad-e Jonubi Rural District, in the Central District of Sanandaj County, Kurdistan Province, Iran. At the 2006 census, its population was 218, in 52 families. The village is populated by Kurds.
