= Pir Baba Ali =

Pir Baba Ali پيرباباعلي
- Village
- Location within Iran
- Coordinates: 35°07′09″N 47°38′41″E
- Country: Iran
- Province: Kurdistan
- County: Qorveh
- Bakhsh: Central
- Rural District: Panjeh Ali

Population (2006)
  - Total: 480
- Time zone: UTC+3:30 (IRST)
  - Summer (DST): UTC+4:30 (IRDT)

Pir Baba Ali (Persian: پيرباباعلي, also Romanized as Pīr Bābā ‘Alī; also known as Pīr Bawali) is a village in Panjeh Ali Rural District, in the Central District of Qorveh County, Kurdistan Province, Iran. At the 2006 census, its population was 480, in 101 families. The village is populated by Kurds.
