= Charandu =

Charandu چرندو
- Village
- Location within Iran
- Coordinates: 35°29′15″N 46°56′59″E
- Country: Iran
- Province: Kurdistan
- County: Sanandaj
- Bakhsh: Central
- Rural District: Sarab Qamish

Population (2006)
  - Total: 379
- Time zone: UTC+3:30 (IRST)
  - Summer (DST): UTC+4:30 (IRDT)

Charandu (Persian: چرندو, also Romanized as Charandū and Charandow; also known as Charnau and Charnū) is a village in Sarab Qamish Rural District, in the Central District of Sanandaj County, Kurdistan Province, Iran. At the 2006 census, its population was 379, in 91 families. The village is populated by Kurds.
