= Amir Aslan =

Amir Aslan اميراصلان
- Village
- Location within Iran
- Coordinates: 36°18′14″N 47°37′44″E
- Country: Iran
- Province: Kurdistan
- County: Bijar
- Bakhsh: Korani
- Rural District: Korani

Population (2006)
  - Total: 139
- Time zone: UTC+3:30 (IRST)
  - Summer (DST): UTC+4:30 (IRDT)

Amir Aslan (Persian: اميراصلان, also Romanized as Amīr Aslān and Amīr Aşlān) is a village in Korani Rural District, Korani District, Bijar County, Kurdistan province, Iran. At the 2006 census, its population was 139, in 26 families. The village is populated by Azerbaijanis.
