= Gav Ahantu =

Gav Ahantu گاو آهن تو
- Village
- Location within Iran
- Coordinates: 35°43′26″N 46°51′13″E
- Country: Iran
- Province: Kurdistan
- County: Divandarreh
- Bakhsh: Saral
- Rural District: Saral

Population (2006)
  - Total: 422
- Time zone: UTC+3:30 (IRST)
  - Summer (DST): UTC+4:30 (IRDT)

Gav Ahantu (Persian: گاو آهن تو, also Romanized as Gāv Āhantū and Gāvāhantū) is a village in Saral Rural District, Saral District, Divandarreh County, Kurdistan Province, Iran. At the 2006 census, its population was 422, in 86 families. The village is populated by Kurds.
