= Baba Riz =

Baba Riz باباريز
- village
- Location within Iran
- Coordinates: 35°21′50″N 47°04′00″E
- Country: Iran
- Province: Kurdistan
- County: Sanandaj
- Bakhsh: Central
- Rural District: Howmeh

Population (2006)
  - Total: 1,479
- Time zone: UTC+3:30 (IRST)
  - Summer (DST): UTC+4:30 (IRDT)

Baba Riz (Persian: باباريز, also Romanized as Bābā Rīz; also known as Bāvarez, Bāvarz, Bāv Rīz, and Bāw-ī-Rīz) is a village in Howmeh Rural District, in the Central District of Sanandaj County, Kurdistan Province, Iran. At the 2006 census, its population was 1,479, in 392 families. The village is populated by Kurds.
