= Qeshlaq Reza =

Qeshlaq Reza قشلاق رضا
- Village
- Location within Iran
- Coordinates: 36°19′10″N 46°34′47″E
- Country: Iran
- Province: Kurdistan
- County: Saqqez
- Bakhsh: Ziviyeh
- Rural District: Saheb

Population (2006)
  - Total: 150
- Time zone: UTC+3:30 (IRST)
  - Summer (DST): UTC+4:30 (IRDT)

Qeshlaq Reza (Persian: قشلاق رضا, also Romanized as Qeshlāq Reẕā) is a village in Saheb Rural District, Ziviyeh District, Saqqez County, Kurdistan Province, Iran. At the 2006 census, its population was 150, in 29 families. The village is populated by Kurds.
