= Bagh Chaleh =

Bagh Chaleh باغ چله
- Village
- Location within Iran
- Coordinates: 35°53′29″N 47°10′08″E
- Country: Iran
- Province: Kurdistan
- County: Divandarreh
- Bakhsh: Central
- Rural District: Howmeh

Population (2006)
  - Total: 525
- Time zone: UTC+3:30 (IRST)
  - Summer (DST): UTC+4:30 (IRDT)

Bagh Chaleh (Persian: باغ چله, also Romanized as Bāgh Chaleh and Bāghcheleh; also known as Baghjaleh, Bāgh Shāleh, Bōgh Shāleh, and Dāq Shāleh) is a village in Howmeh Rural District, in the Central District of Divandarreh County, Kurdistan Province, Iran. At the 2006 census, it had a population of 525, in 119 families. The village is populated by Kurds.
