= Bardeh Buk =

Bardeh Buk برده بوك
- Village
- Location within Iran
- Coordinates: 36°00′07″N 45°40′36″E
- Country: Iran
- Province: Kurdistan
- County: Baneh
- Bakhsh: Namshir
- Rural District: Bowalhasan

Population (2006)
  - Total: 95
- Time zone: UTC+3:30 (IRST)
  - Summer (DST): UTC+4:30 (IRDT)

Bardeh Buk (Persian: برده بوك, also Romanized as Bardeh Būk; also known as Bardbūk) is a village in Bowalhasan Rural District, Namshir District, Baneh County, Kurdistan Province, Iran. At the 2006 census, its population was 95, in 16 families. The village is populated by Kurds.
