= Satileh =

Satileh ساتيله
- Village
- Location within Iran
- Coordinates: 35°24′05″N 46°58′36″E
- Country: Iran
- Province: Kurdistan
- County: Sanandaj
- Bakhsh: Central
- Rural District: Sarab Qamish

Population (2006)
  - Total: 128
- Time zone: UTC+3:30 (IRST)
  - Summer (DST): UTC+4:30 (IRDT)

Satileh (Persian: ساتيله, also Romanized as Sātīleh) is a village in Sarab Qamish Rural District, in the Central District of Sanandaj County, Kurdistan Province, Iran. At the 2006 census, its population was 128, in 31 families. The village is populated by Kurds.
