= Mohammadeh =

Mohammadeh محمده
- Village
- Location within Iran
- Coordinates: 35°35′45″N 46°09′17″E
- Country: Iran
- Province: Kurdistan
- County: Marivan
- Bakhsh: Khav and Mirabad
- Rural District: Khav and Mirabad

Population (2006)
  - Total: 213
- Time zone: UTC+3:30 (IRST)
  - Summer (DST): UTC+4:30 (IRDT)

Mohammadeh (Persian: محمده, also Romanized as Moḩammadeh and Muhammadeh; also known as Maḩmara) is a village in Khav and Mirabad Rural District, Khav and Mirabad District, Marivan County, Kurdistan Province, Iran. At the 2006 census, its population was 213, in 42 families. The village is populated by Kurds.
