= Delow Amadeh =

Delow Amadeh دلو آمده
- Village
- Location within Iran
- Coordinates: 35°35′14″N 47°03′59″E
- Country: Iran
- Province: Kurdistan
- County: Divandarreh
- Bakhsh: Saral
- Rural District: Hoseynabad-e Shomali

Population (2006)
  - Total: 193
- Time zone: UTC+3:30 (IRST)
  - Summer (DST): UTC+4:30 (IRDT)

Delow Amadeh (Persian: دلو آمده, also Romanized as Delow Āmadeh and Delow Amadeh; also known as Dalv Āmadeh, Dalwa Māga, and Delvāmdeh) is a village in Hoseynabad-e Shomali Rural District, Saral District, Divandarreh County, Kurdistan Province, Iran. At the 2006 census, its population was 193, in 30 families. The village is populated by Kurds.
