= Vasneh =

Vasneh وسنه
- Village
- Location within Iran
- Coordinates: 35°29′03″N 46°17′29″E
- Country: Iran
- Province: Kurdistan
- County: Marivan
- Bakhsh: Central
- Rural District: Sarkal

Population (2006)
  - Total: 217
- Time zone: UTC+3:30 (IRST)
  - Summer (DST): UTC+4:30 (IRDT)

Vasneh (Persian: وسنه, also Romanized as Vesnah) is a village in Sarkal Rural District, in the Central District of Marivan County, Kurdistan Province, Iran. At the 2006 census, its population was 217, in 42 families. The village is populated by Kurds.
