= Dabagh =

Dabagh دباغ
- Village
- Location within Iran
- Coordinates: 35°53′23″N 46°58′15″E
- Country: Iran
- Province: Kurdistan
- County: Divandarreh
- Bakhsh: Central
- Rural District: Howmeh

Population (2006)
  - Total: 160
- Time zone: UTC+3:30 (IRST)
  - Summer (DST): UTC+4:30 (IRDT)

Dabagh (Persian: دباغ, romanized: Dabāgh; Kurdish: دەواخ, romanized: Dewax) is a village in Howmeh Rural District, in the Central District of Divandarreh County, Kurdistan Province, Iran. At the 2006 census, its population was 160, in 30 families. The village is populated by Kurds.
