= Barzab =

Barzab برزآب
- Village
- Location within Iran
- Coordinates: 35°10′20″N 46°51′51″E
- Country: Iran
- Province: Kurdistan
- County: Sanandaj
- Bakhsh: Central
- Rural District: Zhavarud-e Sharqi

Population (2006)
  - Total: 46
- Time zone: UTC+3:30 (IRST)
  - Summer (DST): UTC+4:30 (IRDT)

Barzab (Persian: برزآب, also Romanized as Barzāb, Barz Āb, and Borzāb; also known as Barzāo and Barzā’ū) is a village in Zhavarud-e Sharqi Rural District, in the Central District of Sanandaj County, Kurdistan Province, Iran. At the 2006 census, its population was 46, in 11 families. The village is populated by Kurds.
