= Taher Baghdeh =

Taher Baghdeh طاهربغده
- Village
- Location within Iran
- Coordinates: 36°15′13″N 46°02′00″E
- Country: Iran
- Province: Kurdistan
- County: Saqqez
- Bakhsh: Central
- Rural District: Tamugheh

Population (2006)
  - Total: 269
- Time zone: UTC+3:30 (IRST)
  - Summer (DST): UTC+4:30 (IRDT)

Taher Baghdeh (Persian: طاهربغده, also Romanized as Ţāher Baghdeh; also known as Ţāher Būghdeh) is a village in Tamugheh Rural District, in the Central District of Saqqez County, Kurdistan Province, Iran. At the 2006 census, its population was 269, in 38 families. The village is populated by Kurds.
