= Kupich-e Olya =

Kupich-e Olya كوپيچ عليا
- Village
- Location within Iran
- Coordinates: 36°00′45″N 45°51′35″E
- Country: Iran
- Province: Kurdistan
- County: Baneh
- Bakhsh: Central
- Rural District: Shuy

Population (2006)
  - Total: 69
- Time zone: UTC+3:30 (IRST)
  - Summer (DST): UTC+4:30 (IRDT)

Kupich-e Olya (Persian: كوپيچ عليا, also Romanized as Kūpīch-e ‘Olyā) is a village in Shuy Rural District, in the Central District of Baneh County, Kurdistan Province, Iran. At the 2006 census, its population was 69, in 14 families. The village is populated by Kurds.
