= Jaqalu =

Jaqalu جقلو
- Village
- Location within Iran
- Coordinates: 36°00′22″N 47°18′41″E
- Country: Iran
- Province: Kurdistan
- County: Divandarreh
- Bakhsh: Central
- Rural District: Qaratureh

Population (2006)
  - Total: 123
- Time zone: UTC+3:30 (IRST)
  - Summer (DST): UTC+4:30 (IRDT)

Jaqalu (Persian: جقلو, also Romanized as Jaqalū; also known as Chaqalū) is a village in Qaratureh Rural District, in the Central District of Divandarreh County, Kurdistan Province, Iran. At the 2006 census, its population was 123, in 28 families. The village is populated by Kurds.
