= Kiveh Rud =

Kiveh Rud كيوه رود
- Village
- Country: Iran
- Province: Kurdistan
- County: Baneh
- Bakhsh: Namshir
- Rural District: Bowalhasan

Population (2006)
  - Total: 200
- Time zone: UTC+3:30 (IRST)
  - Summer (DST): UTC+4:30 (IRDT)

Kiveh Rud (Persian: كيوه رود, also Romanized as Kīveh Rūd) is a village in Bowalhasan Rural District, Namshir District, Baneh County, Kurdistan Province, Iran. At the 2006 census, its population was 200, in 34 families. The village is populated by Kurds.
