= Gardiglan =

Gardiglan گرديگلان
- Village
- Location within Iran
- Coordinates: 36°23′50″N 46°03′32″E
- Country: Iran
- Province: Kurdistan
- County: Saqqez
- Bakhsh: Central
- Rural District: Torjan

Population (2006)
  - Total: 420
- Time zone: UTC+3:30 (IRST)
  - Summer (DST): UTC+4:30 (IRDT)

Gardiglan (Persian: گرديگلان, also Romanized as Gardīglān; also known as Gardgīlān) is a village in Torjan Rural District, in the Central District of Saqqez County, Kurdistan Province, Iran. At the 2006 census, its population was 420, in 81 families. The village is populated by Kurds.
