= Danikesh =

Danikesh دانيكش
- Village
- Location within Iran
- Coordinates: 35°17′15″N 46°34′26″E
- Country: Iran
- Province: Kurdistan
- County: Sanandaj
- Bakhsh: Kalatrazan
- Rural District: Negel

Population (2006)
  - Total: 557
- Time zone: UTC+3:30 (IRST)
  - Summer (DST): UTC+4:30 (IRDT)

Danikesh (Persian: دانيكش, also Romanized as Dānīkesh and Danikosh; also known as Dāneh Kesh and Dankash) is a village in Negel Rural District, Kalatrazan District, Sanandaj County, Kurdistan Province, Iran. At the 2006 census, its population was 557, in 126 families. The village is populated by Kurds.
