= Khalichian =

Khalichian خليچيان
- Village
- Location within Iran
- Coordinates: 35°24′59″N 47°03′42″E
- Country: Iran
- Province: Kurdistan
- County: Sanandaj
- Bakhsh: Central
- Rural District: Howmeh

Population (2006)
  - Total: 646
- Time zone: UTC+3:30 (IRST)
  - Summer (DST): UTC+4:30 (IRDT)

Khalichian (Persian: خليچيان, also Romanized as Khalīchīān, Khalīchīyān, Khelīchīyān, and Khelīchyān; also known as Khalījīān) is a village in Howmeh Rural District, in the Central District of Sanandaj County, Kurdistan Province, Iran. At the 2006 census, its population was 646, in 165 families. The village is populated by Kurds.
