= Kureh Darreh-ye Sofla =

Kureh Darreh-ye Sofla كوره دره سفلي
- Village
- Location within Iran
- Coordinates: 34°51′40″N 46°47′01″E
- Country: Iran
- Province: Kurdistan
- County: Kamyaran
- Bakhsh: Central
- Rural District: Zhavehrud

Population (2006)
  - Total: 267
- Time zone: UTC+3:30 (IRST)
  - Summer (DST): UTC+4:30 (IRDT)

Kureh Darreh-ye Sofla (Persian: كوره دره سفلي, also Romanized as Kūreh Darreh-ye Soflá; also known as Kūreh Darreh-ye Pā'īn) is a village in Zhavehrud Rural District, in the Central District of Kamyaran County, Kurdistan Province, Iran. At the 2006 census, its population was 267, living in 67 families. The village is populated by Kurds.
