= Hendi Bolagh =

Hendi Bolagh هندي بلاغ
- Village
- Location within Iran
- Coordinates: 35°12′06″N 47°14′26″E
- Country: Iran
- Province: Kurdistan
- County: Dehgolan
- Bakhsh: Bolbanabad
- Rural District: Yeylan-e Jonubi

Population (2006)
  - Total: 38
- Time zone: UTC+3:30 (IRST)
  - Summer (DST): UTC+4:30 (IRDT)

Hendi Bolagh (Persian: هندي بلاغ, also Romanized as Hendī Bolāgh; also known as Hendī Būlakh and Hindibulan) is a village in Yeylan-e Jonubi Rural District, Bolbanabad District, Dehgolan County, Kurdistan Province, Iran. At the 2006 census, its population was 38, in 7 families. The village is populated by Kurds.
