= Sorkheh Dezaj =

Sorkheh Dezaj سرخه دزج
- Village
- Location within Iran
- Coordinates: 35°22′06″N 46°59′11″E
- Country: Iran
- Province: Kurdistan
- County: Sanandaj
- Bakhsh: Central
- Rural District: Arandan

Population (2006)
  - Total: 525
- Time zone: UTC+3:30 (IRST)
  - Summer (DST): UTC+4:30 (IRDT)

Sorkheh Dezaj (Persian: سرخه دزج’ also known as Sūraza, Sūreh Dozdeh, Sūrehduzdeh, and Sūrzeh) is a village in Arandan Rural District, in the Central District of Sanandaj County, Kurdistan Province, Iran. At the 2006 census, its population was 525, in 131 families. The village is populated by Kurds.
