= Khoshkeh Darreh =

Khoshkeh Darreh خشكه دره
- Village
- Location within Iran
- Coordinates: 36°05′24″N 45°52′59″E
- Country: Iran
- Province: Kurdistan
- County: Baneh
- Bakhsh: Central
- Rural District: Shuy

Population (2006)
  - Total: 260
- Time zone: UTC+3:30 (IRST)
  - Summer (DST): UTC+4:30 (IRDT)

Khoshkeh Darreh (Persian: خشكه دره) is a village in Shuy Rural District, in the Central District of Baneh County, Kurdistan Province, Iran. At the 2006 census, its population was 260, in 42 families. The village is populated by Kurds.
