= Qaleh Fulad =

Qaleh Fulad قلعه فولاد
- Village
- Location within Iran
- Coordinates: 35°29′36″N 47°20′25″E
- Country: Iran
- Province: Kurdistan
- County: Dehgolan
- Bakhsh: Central
- Rural District: Yeylan-e Shomali

Population (2006)
  - Total: 166
- Time zone: UTC+3:30 (IRST)
  - Summer (DST): UTC+4:30 (IRDT)

Qaleh Fulad (Persian: قلعه فولاد, also Romanized as Qal‘eh Fūlād and Qal‘eh-ye Fūlād; also known as Qal‘eh-ye Pūlā and Qalla Pola) is a village in Yeylan-e Shomali Rural District, in the Central District of Dehgolan County, Kurdistan Province, Iran. At the 2006 census, its population was 166, in 41 families. The village is populated by Kurds.
