= Zovenj =

Zovenj زونج
- Village
- Location within Iran
- Coordinates: 35°20′51″N 46°31′23″E
- Country: Iran
- Province: Kurdistan
- County: Sanandaj
- Bakhsh: Kalatrazan
- Rural District: Negel

Population (2006)
  - Total: 741
- Time zone: UTC+3:30 (IRST)
  - Summer (DST): UTC+4:30 (IRDT)

Zovenj (Persian: زونج, also Romanized as Zavanj; also known as Zanaj, Zanech, Zonj, and Zownj) is a village in Negel Rural District, Kalatrazan District, Sanandaj County, Kurdistan Province, Iran. At the 2006 census, its population was 741, in 179 families. The village is populated by Kurds.
