= Hijan =

Hijan هيجان
- Village
- Location within Iran
- Coordinates: 36°02′56″N 47°06′37″E
- Country: Iran
- Province: Kurdistan
- County: Divandarreh
- Bakhsh: Central
- Rural District: Qaratureh

Population (2006)
  - Total: 172
- Time zone: UTC+3:30 (IRST)
  - Summer (DST): UTC+4:30 (IRDT)

Hijan (Persian: هيجان, also Romanized as Hījān) is a village in Qaratureh Rural District, in the Central District of Divandarreh County, Kurdistan Province, Iran. At the 2006 census, its population was 172, in 30 families. The village is populated by Kurds.
