= Kucheh Tala =

Kucheh Tala كوچه طلا
- Village
- Location within Iran
- Coordinates: 36°23′15″N 46°49′11″E
- Country: Iran
- Province: Kurdistan
- County: Saqqez
- Bakhsh: Ziviyeh
- Rural District: Gol Tappeh

Population (2006)
  - Total: 229
- Time zone: UTC+3:30 (IRST)
  - Summer (DST): UTC+4:30 (IRDT)

Kucheh Tala (Persian: كوچه طلا, also romanized as Kūcheh Ţalā) is a village in Gol Tappeh Rural District, Ziviyeh District, Saqqez County, Kurdistan Province, Iran. At the 2006 census, its population was 229, in 47 families. The village is populated by Kurds.
