= Quridar =

Quridar قوري در
- Village
- Location within Iran
- Coordinates: 35°06′45″N 47°13′47″E
- Country: Iran
- Province: Kurdistan
- County: Kamyaran
- Bakhsh: Muchesh
- Rural District: Amirabad

Population (2006)
  - Total: 221
- Time zone: UTC+3:30 (IRST)
  - Summer (DST): UTC+4:30 (IRDT)

Quridar (Persian: قوري در, also Romanized as Qūrīdar; also known as Kā’īdar, Karīdar, Kridar, Qarīdar, Qorīdar, and Qorūdar) is a village in Amirabad Rural District, Muchesh District, Kamyaran County, Kurdistan Province, Iran. At the 2006 census, its population was 221, in 47 families. The village is populated by Kurds.
