= Darreh Softeh =

Darreh Softeh دره سفته
- Village
- Location within Iran
- Coordinates: 35°49′33″N 47°06′57″E
- Country: Iran
- Province: Kurdistan
- County: Divandarreh
- Bakhsh: Central
- Rural District: Howmeh

Population (2006)
  - Total: 275
- Time zone: UTC+3:30 (IRST)
  - Summer (DST): UTC+4:30 (IRDT)

Darreh Softeh (Persian: دره سفته, also Romanized as Darreh Sefteh; also known as Darreh Softa, Kal-e Sīpteh, and Kal-i-Sīpteh) is a village in Howmeh Rural District, in the Central District of Divandarreh County, Kurdistan Province, Iran. At the 2006 census, its population was 275, in 61 families. The village is populated by Kurds.
