= Lavisan =

Lavisan لاويسان
- Village
- Location within Iran
- Coordinates: 35°25′49″N 46°27′17″E
- Country: Iran
- Province: Kurdistan
- County: Marivan
- Bakhsh: Central
- Rural District: Kumasi

Population (2006)
  - Total: 220
- Time zone: UTC+3:30 (IRST)
  - Summer (DST): UTC+4:30 (IRDT)

Lavisan (Persian: لاويسان, also Romanized as Lāvīsān) is a village in Kumasi Rural District, in the Central District of Marivan County, Kurdistan Province, Iran. At the 2006 census, its population was 220, in 46 families. The village is populated by Kurds.
