= Cheshmeh Qoli =

Cheshmeh Qoli چشمه قلي
- Village
- Location within Iran
- Coordinates: 35°38′56″N 47°31′15″E
- Country: Iran
- Province: Kurdistan
- County: Bijar
- Bakhsh: Chang Almas
- Rural District: Khosrowabad

Population (2006)
  - Total: 153
- Time zone: UTC+3:30 (IRST)
  - Summer (DST): UTC+4:30 (IRDT)

Cheshmeh Qoli (Persian: چشمه قلي, also Romanized as Cheshmeh Qolī and Chashmeh Qolī; also known as 'Aūz Āghāch and Ūzūn Āqāch) is a village in Khosrowabad Rural District, Chang Almas District, Bijar County, Kurdistan province, Iran. At the 2006 census, its population was 153, in 36 families. The village is populated by Kurds.
