= Gol Qaleh =

Shaqala شاقه‌ڵا
- Village
- Location within Iran
- Coordinates: 35°49′35″N 46°39′29″E
- Country: Iran
- Province: Kurdistan
- County: Divandarreh
- Bakhsh: Central
- Rural District: Chl Chama Rural District

Population (2006)
  - Total: 382
- Time zone: UTC+3:30 (IRST)
  - Summer (DST): UTC+4:30 (IRDT)

Şaqela (Persian: شاه قلعه, Sorani Kurdish: شاقەڵا, also Romanized as Shaqala; also known as Gol qal'eh and Shāh Qal‘eh) is a village in Chl Chama Rural District, in the Central District of Divandarreh County, Kurdistan Province, Iran. According to the 2006 census, its population was 382, in 75 families. The village is populated by Kurds.
