= Alkalu =

Alkalu الكلو
- Village
- Location within Iran
- Coordinates: 36°16′31″N 46°25′02″E
- Country: Iran
- Province: Kurdistan
- County: Saqqez
- Bakhsh: Central
- Rural District: Sara

Population (2006)
  - Total: 425
- Time zone: UTC+3:30 (IRST)
  - Summer (DST): UTC+4:30 (IRDT)

Alkalu (Persian: الكلو, also Romanized as Ālkalū) is a village in Sara Rural District, in the Central District of Saqqez County, Kurdistan Province, Iran. At the 2006 census, its population was 425, in 84 families. The village is populated by Kurds.
