= Qazi Jub =

Qazi Jub قاضي جوب
- Village
- Location within Iran
- Coordinates: 35°20′20″N 47°31′35″E
- Country: Iran
- Province: Kurdistan
- County: Dehgolan
- Bakhsh: Central
- Rural District: Howmeh-ye Dehgolan

Population (2006)
  - Total: 298
- Time zone: UTC+3:30 (IRST)
  - Summer (DST): UTC+4:30 (IRDT)

Qazi Jub (Persian: قاضي جوب, also Romanized as Qāẕī Jūb, and Qāzī Jūb; also known as Qāziju) is a village in Howmeh-ye Dehgolan Rural District, in the Central District of Dehgolan County, Kurdistan Province, Iran. At the 2006 census, its population was 298, in 72 families. The village is populated by Kurds.
