= Kani Jeshni =

Kani Jeshni كاني جشني
- Village
- Location within Iran
- Coordinates: 36°17′29″N 46°21′28″E
- Country: Iran
- Province: Kurdistan
- County: Saqqez
- Bakhsh: Central
- Rural District: Sara

Population (2006)
  - Total: 169
- Time zone: UTC+3:30 (IRST)
  - Summer (DST): UTC+4:30 (IRDT)

Kani Jeshni (Persian: كاني جشني, also Romanized as Kānī Jeshnī; also known as Kānī Cheshnī) is a village in Sara Rural District, in the Central District of Saqqez County, Kurdistan Province, Iran. At the 2006 census, its population was 169, in 34 families. The village is populated by Kurds.
