= Shipanju =

Shipanju شيپانجو
- Village
- Location within Iran
- Coordinates: 35°57′25″N 46°15′28″E
- Country: Iran
- Province: Kurdistan
- County: Saqqez
- Bakhsh: Sarshiv
- Rural District: Zu ol Faqr

Population (2006)
  - Total: 186
- Time zone: UTC+3:30 (IRST)
  - Summer (DST): UTC+4:30 (IRDT)

Shipanju (Persian: شيپانجو, also Romanized as Shīpānjū, Shīpānejū, and Shipanjoo; also known as Sheybānjū and Shīpānajāv) is a village in Zu ol Faqr Rural District, Sarshiv District, Saqqez County, Kurdistan Province, Iran. At the 2006 census, its population was 186, in 36 families. The village is populated by Kurds.
