= Gezel Qayeh =

Gezel Qayeh گزل قايه
- Village
- Location within Iran
- Coordinates: 35°27′29″N 47°52′40″E
- Country: Iran
- Province: Kurdistan
- County: Qorveh
- Bakhsh: Serishabad
- Rural District: Lak

Population (2006)
  - Total: 182
- Time zone: UTC+3:30 (IRST)
  - Summer (DST): UTC+4:30 (IRDT)

Gezel Qayeh (Persian: گزل قايه, also Romanized as Gezel Qāyeh, Gozalqayah, and Gozalqāyeh; also known as Qizil Qiya) is a village in Lak Rural District, Serishabad District, Qorveh County, Kurdistan Province, Iran. At the 2006 census, its population was 182, in 36 families. The village is populated by Kurds.
