= Qilsun =

Qilsun قيلسون
- Village
- Location within Iran
- Coordinates: 36°13′31″N 46°22′42″E
- Country: Iran
- Province: Kurdistan
- County: Saqqez
- Bakhsh: Central
- Rural District: Sara

Population (2006)
  - Total: 499
- Time zone: UTC+3:30 (IRST)
  - Summer (DST): UTC+4:30 (IRDT)

Qilsun (Persian: قيلسون, also Romanized as Qīlsūn) is a village in Sara Rural District, in the Central District of Saqqez County, Kurdistan Province, Iran. At the 2006 census, its population was 499, in 115 families. The village is populated by Kurds.
