= Ali Hamadan =

Ali Hamadan آلي همدان
- Village
- Location within Iran
- Coordinates: 35°36′19″N 46°31′14″E
- Country: Iran
- Province: Kurdistan
- County: Marivan
- Bakhsh: Sarshiv
- Rural District: Gol-e Cheydar

Population (2006)
  - Total: 138
- Time zone: UTC+3:30 (IRST)
  - Summer (DST): UTC+4:30 (IRDT)

Ali Hamadan (Persian: آلي همدان, also Romanized as Ālī Hamadān, ‘Alī Hamadān, ‘Ālī Hamdān, and Ālīhamdān) is a village in Gol-e Cheydar Rural District, Sarshiv District, Marivan County, Kurdistan Province, Iran. At the 2006 census, its population was 138, in 26 families. The village is populated by Kurds.
