= Baba Rar =

Baba Rar بابارار
- Village
- Location within Iran
- Coordinates: 35°59′28″N 47°16′30″E
- Country: Iran
- Province: Kurdistan
- County: Divandarreh
- Bakhsh: Central
- Rural District: Qaratureh

Population (2006)
  - Total: 463
- Time zone: UTC+3:30 (IRST)
  - Summer (DST): UTC+4:30 (IRDT)

Baba Rar (Persian: بابارار, also Romanized as Bābā Rār; also known as Bābā Rād and Barār) is a village in Qaratureh Rural District, in the Central District of Divandarreh County, Kurdistan Province, Iran. At the 2006 census, its population was 463, in 104 families. The village is populated by Kurds.
