= Borjageh =

Borjageh برجگه
- Village
- Location within Iran
- Coordinates: 35°50′47″N 47°35′01″E
- Country: Iran
- Province: Kurdistan
- County: Bijar
- Bakhsh: Central
- Rural District: Howmeh

Population (2006)
  - Total: 107
- Time zone: UTC+3:30 (IRST)
  - Summer (DST): UTC+4:30 (IRDT)

Borjageh (Persian: برجگه; also known as Borjakah, Borjakeh, Borjekeh, Burajgāh, and Būrjgāh) is a village in Howmeh Rural District, in the Central District of Bijar County, Kurdistan Province, Iran. At the 2006 census, its population was 107, in 30 families. The village is populated by Kurds.
