= Chapan-e Olya =

Chapan-e Olya چاپان عليا
- Village
- Location within Iran
- Coordinates: 36°09′59″N 46°34′39″E
- Country: Iran
- Province: Kurdistan
- County: Saqqez
- Bakhsh: Ziviyeh
- Rural District: Emam

Population (2006)
  - Total: 184
- Time zone: UTC+3:30 (IRST)
  - Summer (DST): UTC+4:30 (IRDT)

Chapan-e Olya (Persian: چاپان عليا, also Romanized as Chāpān-e ‘Olyā and Chāpān ‘Olyá; also known as Chāpān and Chāpān-e Bālā) is a village in Emam Rural District, Ziviyeh District, Saqqez County, Kurdistan Province, Iran. At the 2006 census, its population was 184, in 44 families. The village is populated by Kurds.
