= Qatlu =

Qatlu قتلو
- Village
- Location within Iran
- Coordinates: 36°05′34″N 46°29′56″E
- Country: Iran
- Province: Kurdistan
- County: Saqqez
- Bakhsh: Ziviyeh
- Rural District: Khvor Khvoreh

Population (2006)
  - Total: 83
- Time zone: UTC+3:30 (IRST)
  - Summer (DST): UTC+4:30 (IRDT)

Qatlu (Persian: قتلو, also Romanized as Qatlū) is a village in Khvor Khvoreh Rural District, Ziviyeh District, Saqqez County, Kurdistan Province, Iran. At the 2006 census, its population was 83, in 17 families. The village is populated by Kurds.
