= Kay Vosheh =

Kay Vosheh كايوشه
- Village
- Location within Iran
- Coordinates: 35°23′50″N 47°18′24″E
- Country: Iran
- Province: Kurdistan
- County: Dehgolan
- Bakhsh: Central
- Rural District: Quri Chay

Population (2006)
  - Total: 58
- Time zone: UTC+3:30 (IRST)
  - Summer (DST): UTC+4:30 (IRDT)

Kay Vosheh (Persian: كايوشه, also Romanized as Kāy Vosheh, Kāy Vasheh, and Kīvosheh; also known as Kāewasheh and Kā’ī Vacheh) is a village in Quri Chay Rural District, in the Central District of Dehgolan County, Kurdistan Province, Iran. At the 2006 census, its population was 58, in 12 families. The village is populated by Kurds.
