= Rikhalan =

Rikhalan ريخلان
- Village
- Location within Iran
- Coordinates: 35°27′54″N 46°10′48″E
- Country: Iran
- Province: Kurdistan
- County: Marivan
- Bakhsh: Central
- Rural District: Sarkal

Population (2006)
  - Total: 299
- Time zone: UTC+3:30 (IRST)
  - Summer (DST): UTC+4:30 (IRDT)

Rikhalan (Persian: ريخلان, also Romanized as Rīkhalān) is a village in Sarkal Rural District, in the Central District of Marivan County, Kurdistan Province, Iran. At the 2006 census, its population was 299, in 62 families. The village is populated by Kurds.
