= Jamian =

Jamian جميان
- Village
- Location within Iran
- Coordinates: 36°21′50″N 46°03′24″E
- Country: Iran
- Province: Kurdistan
- County: Saqqez
- Bakhsh: Central
- Rural District: Torjan

Population (2006)
  - Total: 61
- Time zone: UTC+3:30 (IRST)
  - Summer (DST): UTC+4:30 (IRDT)

Jamian (Persian: جميان, also Romanized as Jamīān) is a village in Torjan Rural District, in the Central District of Saqqez County, Kurdistan Province, Iran. At the 2006 census, its population was 61, in 10 families. The village is populated by Kurds.
