= Mazerlan =

Mazerlan مزرلان
- Village
- Location within Iran
- Coordinates: 36°00′42″N 45°38′45″E
- Country: Iran
- Province: Kurdistan
- County: Baneh
- Bakhsh: Namshir
- Rural District: Bowalhasan

Population (2006)
  - Total: 143
- Time zone: UTC+3:30 (IRST)
  - Summer (DST): UTC+4:30 (IRDT)

Mazerlan (Persian: مزرلان, also Romanized as Mazerlān; also known as Marzelān) is a village in Bowalhasan Rural District, Namshir District, Baneh County, Kurdistan Province, Iran. At the 2006 census, its population was 143, in 30 families. The village is populated by Kurds.
