= Tateh Rashid =

Tateh Rashid تاته رشيد
- Village
- Location within Iran
- Coordinates: 35°23′19″N 47°17′00″E
- Country: Iran
- Province: Kurdistan
- County: Dehgolan
- Bakhsh: Central
- Rural District: Quri Chay

Population (2006)
  - Total: 264
- Time zone: UTC+3:30 (IRST)
  - Summer (DST): UTC+4:30 (IRDT)

Tateh Rashid (Persian: تاته رشيد, also Romanized as Tāteh Rashīd and Tāteh-ye Rashīd; also known as Tatarashi and Tātārshī) is a village in Quri Chay Rural District, in the Central District of Dehgolan County, Kurdistan Province, Iran. At the 2006 census, its population was 264, in 58 families. The village is populated by Kurds.
