= Qahrabad =

Qahrabad قهرآباد
- village
- Location within Iran
- Coordinates: 36°19′02″N 46°14′59″E
- Country: Iran
- Province: Kurdistan
- County: Saqqez
- Bakhsh: Central
- Rural District: Sara

Population (2006)
  - Total: 561
- Time zone: UTC+3:30 (IRST)
  - Summer (DST): UTC+4:30 (IRDT)

Qahrabad (Persian: قهرآباد, also Romanized as Qahrābād; also known as Qahrābād-e Āltūn) is a village in Sara Rural District, in the Central District of Saqqez County, Kurdistan Province, Iran. At the 2006 census, its population was 561, in 116 families. The village is populated by Kurds.
