= Vali Beyg =

Vali Beyg ولي بيگ
- Village
- Location within Iran
- Coordinates: 36°10′33″N 47°44′54″E
- Country: Iran
- Province: Kurdistan
- County: Bijar
- Bakhsh: Korani
- Rural District: Korani

Population (2006)
  - Total: 152
- Time zone: UTC+3:30 (IRST)
  - Summer (DST): UTC+4:30 (IRDT)

Vali Beyg (Persian: ولي بيگ, also Romanized as Valī Beyg) is a village in Korani Rural District, Korani District, Bijar County, Kurdistan Province, Iraq. At the 2006 census, its population was 152, in 31 families. The village is populated by Azerbaijanis.
