= Nowgaran =

Nowgaran ناوگران
- Village
- Location within Iran
- Coordinates: 35°27′37″N 47°12′39″E
- Country: Iran
- Province: Kurdistan
- County: Dehgolan
- Bakhsh: Central
- Rural District: Quri Chay

Population (2006)
  - Total: 194
- Time zone: UTC+3:30 (IRST)
  - Summer (DST): UTC+4:30 (IRDT)

Nowgaran (Persian: ناوگران, also Romanized as Nowgarān, Nau Garān, Nāvgarān, and Now Garān; also known as Namgaran) is a village in Quri Chay Rural District, in the Central District of Dehgolan County, Kurdistan Province, Iran. At the 2006 census, its population was 194, in 37 families. The village is populated by Kurds.
