= Sorkheh Tut =

Sorkheh Tut سرخه توت
- Village
- Location within Iran
- Coordinates: 34°55′02″N 47°04′26″E
- Country: Iran
- Province: Kurdistan
- County: Kamyaran
- Bakhsh: Muchesh
- Rural District: Sursur

Population (2006)
  - Total: 97
- Time zone: UTC+3:30 (IRST)
  - Summer (DST): UTC+4:30 (IRDT)

Sorkheh Tut (Persian: سرخه توت, also Romanized as Sorkheh Tūt) is a village in Sursur Rural District, Muchesh District, Kamyaran County, Kurdistan Province, Iran. At the 2006 census, its population was 97, in 26 families. The village is populated by Kurds.
