= Timan Qaleh =

Timan Qaleh تيمان قلعه
- Village
- Location within Iran
- Coordinates: 36°06′05″N 46°41′54″E
- Country: Iran
- Province: Kurdistan
- County: Saqqez
- Bakhsh: Ziviyeh
- Rural District: Tilakuh

Population (2006)
  - Total: 107
- Time zone: UTC+3:30 (IRST)
  - Summer (DST): UTC+4:30 (IRDT)

Timan Qaleh (Persian: تيمان قلعه, also Romanized as Tīmān Qal‘eh) is a village in Tilakuh Rural District, Ziviyeh District, Saqqez County, Kurdistan Province, Iran. At the 2006 census, its population was 107, in 20 families. The village is populated by Kurds.
