= Aji Chay, Iran =

Aji Chay آجي چاي
- Village
- Location within Iran
- Coordinates: 35°17′37″N 47°51′32″E
- Country: Iran
- Province: Kurdistan
- County: Qorveh
- Bakhsh: Serishabad
- Rural District: Qaslan

Population (2006)
  - Total: 212
- Time zone: UTC+3:30 (IRST)
  - Summer (DST): UTC+4:30 (IRDT)

Aji Chay (Persian: آجي چاي, also Romanized as Ājī Chāy; also known as Azījeh) is a village in Qaslan Rural District, Serishabad District, Qorveh County, Kurdistan Province, Iran. At the 2006 census, its population was 212, in 62 families. The village is populated by Kurds.
