= Javanmardabad =

Javanmardabad جوانمرد آباد
- Village
- Location within Iran
- Coordinates: 35°12′35″N 47°25′11″E
- Country: Iran
- Province: Kurdistan
- County: Dehgolan
- Bakhsh: Bolbanabad
- Rural District: Sis

Population (2006)
  - Total: 258
- Time zone: UTC+3:30 (IRST)
  - Summer (DST): UTC+4:30 (IRDT)

Javanmardabad (Persian: جوانمرد آباد, also Romanized as Javānmardābād; also known as Javān Mīrābād and Jawānmīrābād) is a village in Sis Rural District, Bolbanabad District, Dehgolan County, Kurdistan Province, Iran. At the 2006 census, its population was 258, in 57 families. The village is populated by Kurds.
