= Mareh Darreh =

Mareh Darreh مره دره
- Village
- Location within Iran
- Coordinates: 35°50′59″N 46°49′49″E
- Country: Iran
- Province: Kurdistan
- County: Divandarreh
- Bakhsh: Saral
- Rural District: Saral

Population (2006)
  - Total: 129
- Time zone: UTC+3:30 (IRST)
  - Summer (DST): UTC+4:30 (IRDT)

Mareh Darreh (Persian: مره دره; also known as Mareh Dar) is a village in Saral Rural District, Saral District, Divandarreh County, Kurdistan Province, Iran. At the 2006 census, its population was 129, in 27 families. The village is populated by Kurds.
