= Haqqeh =

Haqqeh حقه
- Village
- Location within Iran
- Coordinates: 35°34′11″N 47°19′42″E
- Country: Iran
- Province: Kurdistan
- County: Dehgolan
- Bakhsh: Central
- Rural District: Yeylan-e Shomali

Population (2006)
  - Total: 102
- Time zone: UTC+3:30 (IRST)
  - Summer (DST): UTC+4:30 (IRDT)

Haqqeh (Persian: حقه, also Romanized as Ḩaqqeh) is a village in Yeylan-e Shomali Rural District, in the Central District of Dehgolan County, Kurdistan Province, Iran. At the 2006 census, its population was 102, in 25 families. The village is populated by Kurds.
