= Tabisheh =

Tabisheh طابيشه
- Village
- Location within Iran
- Coordinates: 36°04′23″N 46°22′44″E
- Country: Iran
- Province: Kurdistan
- County: Saqqez
- Bakhsh: Sarshiv
- Rural District: Zu ol Faqr

Population (2006)
  - Total: 36
- Time zone: UTC+3:30 (IRST)
  - Summer (DST): UTC+4:30 (IRDT)

Tabisheh (Persian: طابيشه, also Romanized as Ţābīsheh) is a village in Zu ol Faqr Rural District, Sarshiv District, Saqqez County, Kurdistan Province, Iran. At the 2006 census, its population was 36, in 6 families. The village is populated by Kurds.
