= Dowleh Sir =

Dowleh Sir دوله سير
- Village
- Location within Iran
- Coordinates: 36°09′21″N 46°41′36″E
- Country: Iran
- Province: Kurdistan
- County: Saqqez
- Bakhsh: Ziviyeh
- Rural District: Tilakuh

Population (2006)
  - Total: 81
- Time zone: UTC+3:30 (IRST)
  - Summer (DST): UTC+4:30 (IRDT)

Dowleh Sir (Persian: دوله سير, also Romanized as Dowleh Sīr and Dūlehsīr) is a village in Tilakuh Rural District, Ziviyeh District, Saqqez County, Kurdistan Province, Iran. At the 2006 census, its population was 81, in 15 families. The village is populated by Kurds.
