= Omarshal =

Omarshal عمرشال
- Village
- Location within Iran
- Coordinates: 36°02′46″N 45°53′30″E
- Country: Iran
- Province: Kurdistan
- County: Baneh
- Bakhsh: Central
- Rural District: Shuy

Population (2006)
  - Total: 239
- Time zone: UTC+3:30 (IRST)
  - Summer (DST): UTC+4:30 (IRDT)

Omarshal (Persian: عمرشال, also Romanized as ‘Omarshāl) is a village in Shuy Rural District, in the Central District of Baneh County, Kurdistan Province, Iran. At the 2006 census, its population was 239, in 44 families. The village is populated by Kurds.
