= Zagheh Fulad =

Zagheh Fulad زاغه فولاد
- Village
- Location within Iran
- Coordinates: 35°55′17″N 47°44′34″E
- Country: Iran
- Province: Kurdistan
- County: Bijar
- Bakhsh: Central
- Rural District: Khvor Khvoreh

Population (2006)
  - Total: 89
- Time zone: UTC+3:30 (IRST)
  - Summer (DST): UTC+4:30 (IRDT)

Zagheh Fulad (Persian: زاغه فولاد, also Romanized as Zāgheh Fūlād and Zāgheh-ye Fūlād) is a village in Khvor Khvoreh Rural District, in the Central District of Bijar County, Kurdistan Province, Iran. At the 2006 census, its population was 89, in 28 families. The village is populated by Kurds.
