= Baghdeh Kandi =

Boghdeh Kandi بغده‌کندی
- Village
- Location within Iran
- Coordinates: 36°25′14″N 46°08′59″E
- Country: Iran
- Province: Kurdistan
- County: Saqqez
- Bakhsh: Central
- Rural District: Torjan

Population (2006)
  - Total: 456
- Time zone: UTC+3:30 (IRST)
  - Summer (DST): UTC+4:30 (IRDT)

Boghdeh Kandi (Persian: بغده‌کندی, also Romanized as Boghdeh Kandī; also known as Boghdā Kandī and Būghdā Kandī) is a village in Torjan Rural District, in the Central District of Saqqez County, Kurdistan Province, Iran. At the 2006 census, its population was 456, in 88 families. The village is populated by Kurds.
