= Zhenin =

Zhenin ژنين
- Village
- Location within Iran
- Coordinates: 35°08′21″N 46°34′53″E
- Country: Iran
- Province: Kurdistan
- County: Sarvabad
- Bakhsh: Central
- Rural District: Paygelan

Population (2006)
  - Total: 1,404
- Time zone: UTC+3:30 (IRST)
  - Summer (DST): UTC+4:30 (IRDT)

Zhenin (Persian: ژنين, also Romanized as Zhenīn; also known as Zenain and Zeneyn) is a village in Paygelan Rural District, in the Central District of Sarvabad County, Kurdistan Province, Iran. At the 2006 census, its population was 1,404, in 340 families. The village is populated by Kurds.
