= Geleh Sureh =

Geleh Sureh گله سوره
- Village
- Location within Iran
- Coordinates: 35°58′36″N 45°36′12″E
- Country: Iran
- Province: Kurdistan
- County: Baneh
- Bakhsh: Namshir
- Rural District: Bowalhasan

Population (2006)
  - Total: 86
- Time zone: UTC+3:30 (IRST)
  - Summer (DST): UTC+4:30 (IRDT)

Geleh Sureh (Persian: گله سوره, also Romanized as Geleh Sūreh; also known as Geleh Sūr) is a village in Bowalhasan Rural District, Namshir District, Baneh County, Kurdistan Province, Iran. At the 2006 census, its population was 86, in 17 families. The village is populated by Kurds.
