= Mansur Bolaghi =

Mansur Bolaghi منصوربلاغي
- Village
- Location within Iran
- Coordinates: 35°34′48″N 47°15′39″E
- Country: Iran
- Province: Kurdistan
- County: Sanandaj
- Bakhsh: Central
- Rural District: Hoseynabad-e Jonubi

Population (2006)
  - Total: 261
- Time zone: UTC+3:30 (IRST)
  - Summer (DST): UTC+4:30 (IRDT)

Mansur Bolaghi (Persian: منصوربلاغي, also Romanized as Manşūr Bolāghī) is a village in Hoseynabad-e Jonubi Rural District, in the Central District of Sanandaj County, Kurdistan Province, Iran. At the 2006 census, its population was 261, in 63 families. The village is populated by Kurds.
