= Kani Taleh =

Kani Taleh كاني تاله
- Village
- Location within Iran
- Coordinates: 35°33′31″N 46°50′10″E
- Country: Iran
- Province: Kurdistan
- County: Sanandaj
- Bakhsh: Central
- Rural District: Sarab Qamish

Population (2006)
  - Total: 16
- Time zone: UTC+3:30 (IRST)
  - Summer (DST): UTC+4:30 (IRDT)

Kani Taleh (Persian: كاني تاله, also Romanized as Kānī Tāleh; also known as Kānī Ţalā and Kānī Tālā) is a village in Sarab Qamish Rural District, in the Central District of Sanandaj County, Kurdistan Province, Iran. At the 2006 census, its population was 16, in 5 families. The village is populated by Kurds.
