= Kus Anbar =

Kus Anbar كوس عنبر
- Village
- Location within Iran
- Coordinates: 35°39′14″N 46°45′27″E
- Country: Iran
- Province: Kurdistan
- County: Divandarreh
- Bakhsh: Saral
- Rural District: Saral

Population (2006)
  - Total: 268
- Time zone: UTC+3:30 (IRST)
  - Summer (DST): UTC+4:30 (IRDT)

Kus Anbar (Persian: كوس عنبر, also Romanized as Kūs ‘Anbar) is a village in Saral Rural District, Saral District, Divandarreh County, Kurdistan Province, Iran. At the 2006 census, its population was 268, in 47 families. The village is populated by Kurds.
