= Ayaghchi =

Ayaghchi اياغچي
- Village
- Location within Iran
- Coordinates: 36°23′23″N 46°46′20″E
- Country: Iran
- Province: Kurdistan
- County: Saqqez
- Bakhsh: Ziviyeh
- Rural District: Gol Tappeh

Population (2006)
  - Total: 162
- Time zone: UTC+3:30 (IRST)
  - Summer (DST): UTC+4:30 (IRDT)

Ayaghchi (Persian: اياغچي, also Romanized as Ayāghchī; also known as Āyākhchī) is a village in Gol Tappeh Rural District, Ziviyeh District, Saqqez County, Kurdistan Province, Iran. At the 2006 census, its population was 162, in 29 families. The village is populated by Kurds.
