= Cheshmeh Kazem =

Cheshmeh Kazem چشمه كاظم
- Village
- Location within Iran
- Coordinates: 35°50′02″N 47°23′29″E
- Country: Iran
- Province: Kurdistan
- County: Bijar
- Bakhsh: Central
- Rural District: Howmeh

Population (2006)
  - Total: 93
- Time zone: UTC+3:30 (IRST)
  - Summer (DST): UTC+4:30 (IRDT)

Cheshmeh Kazem (Persian: چشمه كاظم, also Romanized as Cheshmeh-e Kāz̧em, Cheshmeh Kāz̧em, Chashmeh-ye Kāz̄ām, and Cheshmeh-ye Kāz̧em; also known as Chashmeh Kāzim and Cheshmeh Kāz̧emīyeh) is a village in Howmeh Rural District, in the Central District of Bijar County, Kurdistan Province, Iran. At the 2006 census, its population was 93, in 25 families. The village is populated by Kurds.
