= Barudar =

Barudar برودر
- Village
- Location within Iran
- Coordinates: 35°29′28″N 46°44′57″E
- Country: Iran
- Province: Kurdistan
- County: Sanandaj
- Bakhsh: Kalatrazan
- Rural District: Kalatrazan

Population (2006)
  - Total: 216
- Time zone: UTC+3:30 (IRST)
  - Summer (DST): UTC+4:30 (IRDT)

Barudar (Persian: برودر, also Romanized as Barūdar; also known as Bartūdār) is a village in Kalatrazan Rural District, Kalatrazan District, Sanandaj County, Kurdistan Province, Iran. At the 2006 census, its population was 216, in 43 families. The village is populated by Kurds.
