= Buaneh =

Buaneh بوانه
- Village
- Location within Iran
- Coordinates: 34°51′55″N 46°57′22″E
- Country: Iran
- Province: Kurdistan
- County: Kamyaran
- Bakhsh: Central
- Rural District: Bilavar

Population (2006)
  - Total: 186
- Time zone: UTC+3:30 (IRST)
  - Summer (DST): UTC+4:30 (IRDT)

Buaneh (Persian: بوانه, also Romanized as Būāneh) is a village in Bilavar Rural District, in the Central District of Kamyaran County, Kurdistan Province, Iran. At the 2006 census, its population was 186, in 45 families. The village is populated by Kurds.
