= Harmileh =

Harmileh هرميله
- Village
- Location within Iran
- Coordinates: 36°18′39″N 46°04′52″E
- Country: Iran
- Province: Kurdistan
- County: Saqqez
- Bakhsh: Central
- Rural District: Sara

Population (2006)
  - Total: 178
- Time zone: UTC+3:30 (IRST)
  - Summer (DST): UTC+4:30 (IRDT)

Harmileh (Persian: هرميله, also Romanized as Harmīleh) is a village in Sara Rural District, in the Central District of Saqqez County, Kurdistan Province, Iran. At the 2006 census its population was 178, in 32 families. The village is populated by Kurds.
