= Jebreilan =

Jebreilan جبرئيلان
- Village
- Location within Iran
- Coordinates: 35°31′19″N 47°09′20″E
- Country: Iran
- Province: Kurdistan
- County: Sanandaj
- Bakhsh: Central
- Rural District: Hoseynabad-e Jonubi

Population (2006)
  - Total: 253
- Time zone: UTC+3:30 (IRST)
  - Summer (DST): UTC+4:30 (IRDT)

Jebreilan (Persian: جبرئيلان, also Romanized as Jebre’īlān, Jabrā’īlān, Jabrāyelān, and Jabre‘īlān; also known as Jarailāl, Jarallāl, and Jūbarīlān) is a village in Hoseynabad-e Jonubi Rural District, in the Central District of Sanandaj County, Kurdistan Province, Iran. At the 2006 census, its population was 253, in 53 families. The village is populated by Kurds.
