= Chaqmaq Darreh =

Chaqmaq Darreh چقماق دره
- Village
- Location within Iran
- Coordinates: 35°16′00″N 47°15′06″E
- Country: Iran
- Province: Kurdistan
- County: Dehgolan
- Bakhsh: Central
- Rural District: Quri Chay

Population (2006)
  - Total: 268
- Time zone: UTC+3:30 (IRST)
  - Summer (DST): UTC+4:30 (IRDT)

Chaqmaq Darreh (Persian: چقماق دره, also Romanized as Chaqmāq Darreh and Chaqmāq Dareh; also known as Chakhmāgh Dareh, Chakhmak Darreh, and Chakhmāqdarreh) is a village in Quri Chay Rural District, in the Central District of Dehgolan County, Kurdistan Province, Iran. At the 2006 census, its population was 268, in 56 families. The village is populated by Kurds.
