= Bahrami =

Bahrami may refer to:

== People ==
- Bahrami (surname)

== Places ==
- Abbasabad-e Bahrami, Rigan County, Kerman Province, Iran
- Bahrami, Khorramabad County, Lorestan Province, Iran
- Bahrami-ye Olya, Jiroft County, Kerman Province, Iran
- Bahrami-ye Sofla, Jiroft County, Kerman Province, Iran
- Kohneh Bahrami, Izeh County, Khuzestan Province, Iran
- Mahmudiyeh-ye Bahrami, Rafsanjan County, Kerman Province, Iran
- Shah Bahrami, Kavar County, Fars Province, Iran
