= Bahram, Iran =

Bahram (Persian: بهرام) may refer to the following places in Iran:

- Bahram, East Azerbaijan
- Bahram, Heris, East Azerbaijan Province
- Bahram, Kurdistan
- Bahram, Lorestan
- Bahram, West Azerbaijan

== See also ==
- Bahram (disambiguation)
