= Bahrom =

Bahrom or Bakhrom is a variant of the Persian male given name Bahram, in Uzbek (Баҳром), and in Tajik (Баҳром). It is also a Malay name. Notable people with the name include

== Given name ==
- Bakhromjon Gaziev (born 1979), Uzbek sports administrator
- Bakhrom Khamroyev (born 1963/64), Uzbek lawyer
- Bakhrom Yakubov (1961–2021), Uzbek film director
- Bahrom Norqobilov (born 1973), Uzbekistani statesman

== Surname ==
- Hasan Bahrom (born 1956), Malaysian politician
- Pengiran Bahrom (born 1963), politician and educator from Brunei

== Others ==
- Bahrom Vafoev Stadium, a multi-use stadium in Mubarek, Uzbekistan.
- Bahrom International Program, at Seoul Women's University (SWU), in South Korea
