= Varamin =

City in Tehran province, Iran

Varamin Persian: ورامين
- City
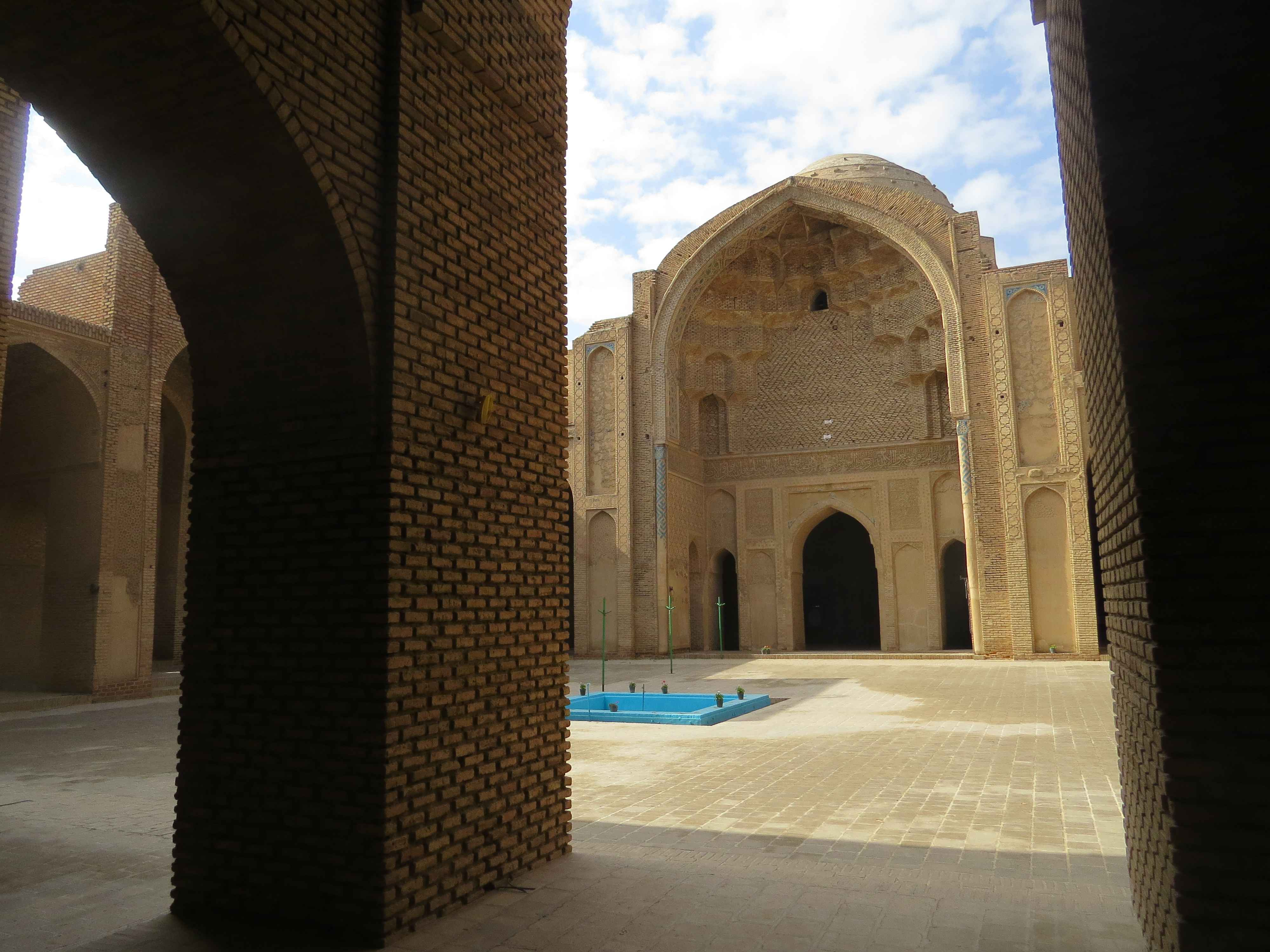
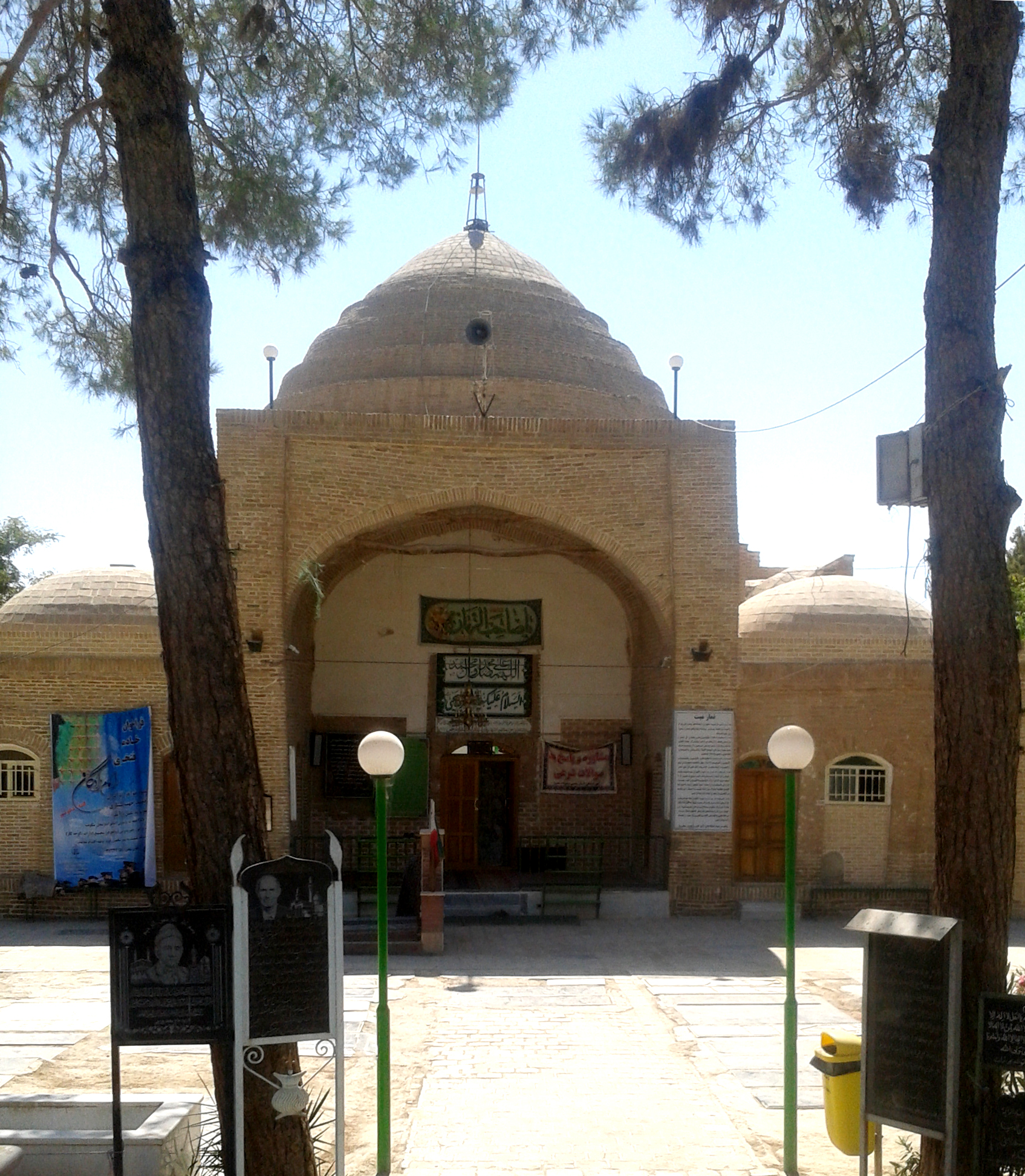
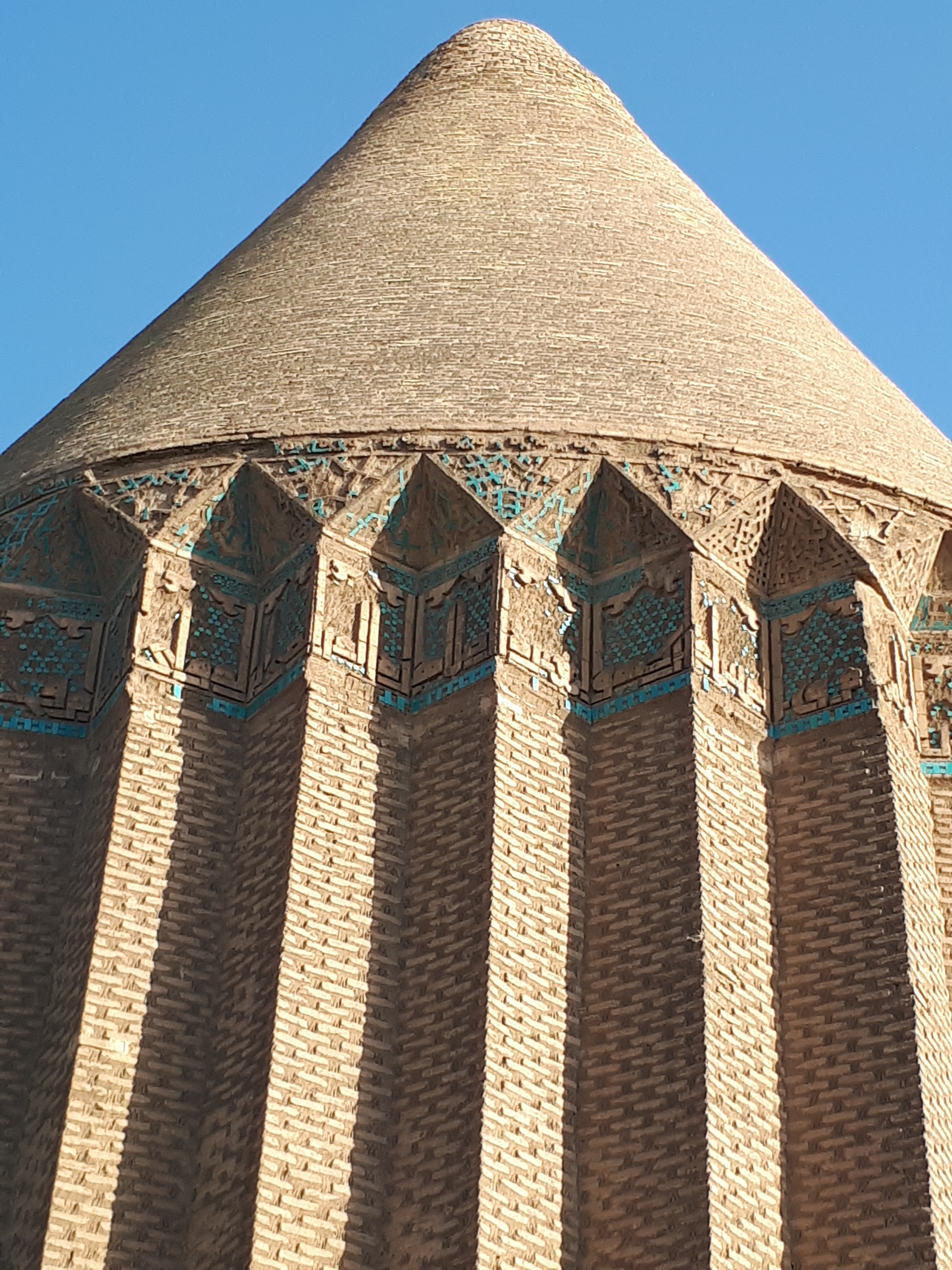
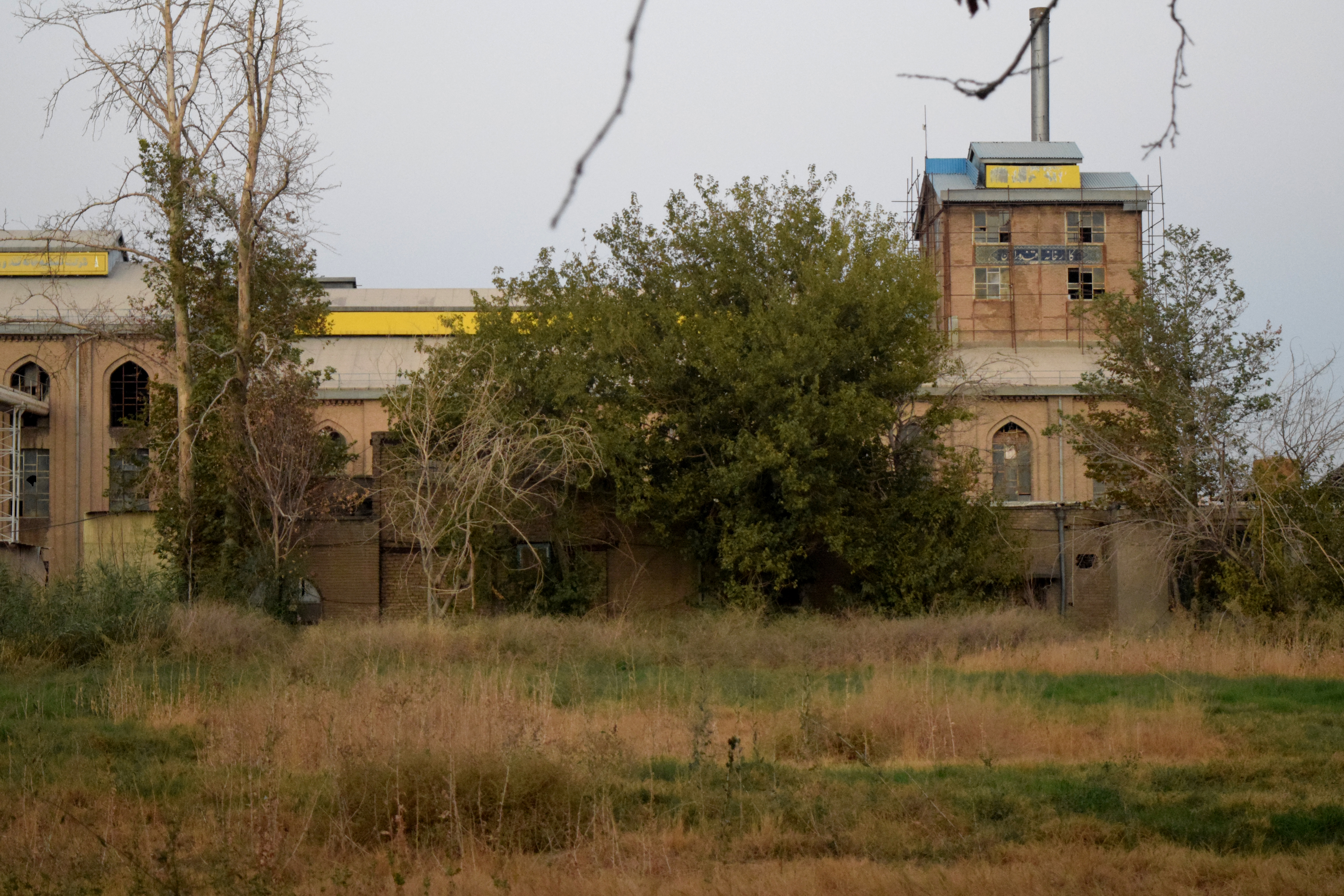
- From top to bottom Courtyard of Jameh Mosque of Varamin, Imamzadeh Yahya, Aladdin Tower, Sugar factory
- Interactive map of Varamin
- Location within Iran
- Coordinates: 35°21′01″N 51°38′11″E
- Country: Iran
- Province: Tehran
- County: Varamin
- District: Central
- Elevation: 915 m (3,002 ft)

Population (2016)
  - Total: 225,628
- Time zone: UTC+3:30 (IRST)
- Area code: 021 (Formerly 0291)

Varamin (Persian: ورامين; /værɑːˈmɪn/) (Note: Also romanized as Varāmīn and Verāmin) is a city in the Central District of Varamin County, Tehran province, Iran, serving as capital of both the county and the district.

== Etymology ==
The word "Varamin" has been recorded with the same spelling and pronunciation in Perso-Arabic script since 3rd A.H. century. While its etymology is not clear, there have been many speculations which are almost all not more than guesses. The entry "Varām" in Burhan-i Qati is defined as:"... Things that are easy and light, and a city in Mulk-i Rayy that is known also as Varāmin." Mir Jalaleddin Kazzazi says "Varām" is a variant of the name Bahram (equivalent to Vahram in Pahlavi and Armenian), and may be from Varām+in meaning 'place of Bahram.'

The name has been transliterated in Latin scripts in many ways; such as Veramin, Veramine, Weramin, Weramine, Veraumin, and other variants, while Encyclopedia Iranica uses Varāmīn.

== History ==
Until 1220s, Varamin was an agricultural center of Ray. The raiding of Ray by the invading Mongols caused a flux of migration and economical growth during Mongol Ilkhanid rule. Thus, Varamin developed into an urban center. A Vizier of Ilkhanid Abu Sa'id, named Yusuf Quhadhi built the Jameh Mosque of Varamin. Other significant monuments from this era include mausoleum of Imamzadeh Yahya, Aladdin Tower, Imamzadeh Shah Husayn, and Sharif mosque. At the turn of 14th century, Varamin started to decline due to Timurid Empire armies' invasions. In 1405, Ruy González de Clavijo described the city as mostly deserted, although during early Timurid rule, a minor restoration was applied to the Jameh mosque and Imamzadeh Hosein Reza was built. By 16th century, Tehran started to grow as the major city of the region.

== Demographics ==
Historical population
Year	Pop.	±%
1956	5,205	—
1966	11,183	+114.9%
1976	25,892	+131.5%
1986	58,311	+125.2%
1996	72,331	+24.0%
2006	208,569	+188.4%
2011	218,991	+5.0%
2016	225,628	+3.0%

=== Population ===
At the time of the 2006 National Census, the city's population was 208,569 in 53,639 households. The following census in 2011 counted 218,991 people in 62,884 households. The 2015 census measured the population of the city as 216000 people in 69,190 households.

== Climate ==
Varamin has a hot desert climate (BWh) according to the Köppen climate classification. According to the information of the State Meteorological Organization of Iran, the long-term average annual rainfall of Varamin is around 107.5 mm

Climate data for Varamin
Month	Jan	Feb	Mar	Apr	May	Jun	Jul	Aug	Sep	Oct	Nov	Dec	Year
Mean daily maximum °C (°F)	11 (52)	13 (55)	19 (66)	25 (77)	31 (88)	37 (99)	40 (104)	38 (100)	34 (93)	27 (81)	17 (63)	12 (54)	25 (78)
Mean daily minimum °C (°F)	1 (34)	3 (37)	8 (46)	13 (55)	19 (66)	25 (77)	27 (81)	26 (79)	22 (72)	15 (59)	8 (46)	3 (37)	14 (57)
Average rainfall mm (inches)	19.4 (0.76)	23.0 (0.91)	27.1 (1.07)	21.4 (0.84)	7.1 (0.28)	1.1 (0.04)	0.9 (0.04)	0.8 (0.03)	0.9 (0.04)	9.5 (0.37)	32.2 (1.27)	18.1 (0.71)	161.5 (6.36)
Average snowfall cm (inches)	0.4 (0.2)	0.9 (0.4)	0.0 (0.0)	0.0 (0.0)	0.0 (0.0)	0.0 (0.0)	0.0 (0.0)	0.0 (0.0)	0.0 (0.0)	0.0 (0.0)	0.3 (0.1)	0.0 (0.0)	1.6 (0.7)
Average rainy days	3	3	3	3	1	0	0	0	0	1	3	3	20
Average relative humidity (%)	42	42	33	29	23	15	15	17	18	27	41	45	29
Mean monthly sunshine hours	223.2	203.4	294.5	339	368.9	366	375.1	375.1	348	238.7	219	226.3	3,577.2
Mean daily sunshine hours	7.2	7.2	9.5	11.3	11.9	12.2	12.1	12.1	11.6	7.7	7.3	7.3	9.8
Mean daily daylight hours	10.1	10.9	12	13.1	14	14.5	14.3	13.5	12.4	11.3	10.3	9.8	12.2
Average ultraviolet index	2	3	4	6	7	8	8	7	6	5	3	3	5
Source 1: World Weather Online(2009-2023)
Source 2: Weather Atlas (Humidity-sun-daylight)

== Landmarks ==
=== Ilkhanid architecture ===
During the Mongol Ilkhanate, as a result of the economic growth in the region, Varamin became an urban center and most of the significant historical monuments of this city belong to this period. Including:

==== Jameh mosque ====
The most famous building of the city, the Jameh mosque's construction began during Öljaitü's reign and completed in during his son's rule in 1322.

==== Aladdin tower ====
A cylindrical tomb with a conic dome was built in 1289 over a local ruler's grave.

==== Imamzadeh Yahya ====
The tomb of a descendant of Muhammad in the city, famed for its tile-works. The tomb was constructed in 1307.

==== Others ====
Other than the three mentioned above, another tomb known as Shah Hoseyn was also built in Ilkhanid era. Portal of Masjid-i Sharif, which does not exist nowadays is mentioned to be completed in 1307. An Ilkhanid graveyard was unearthed in 2016.

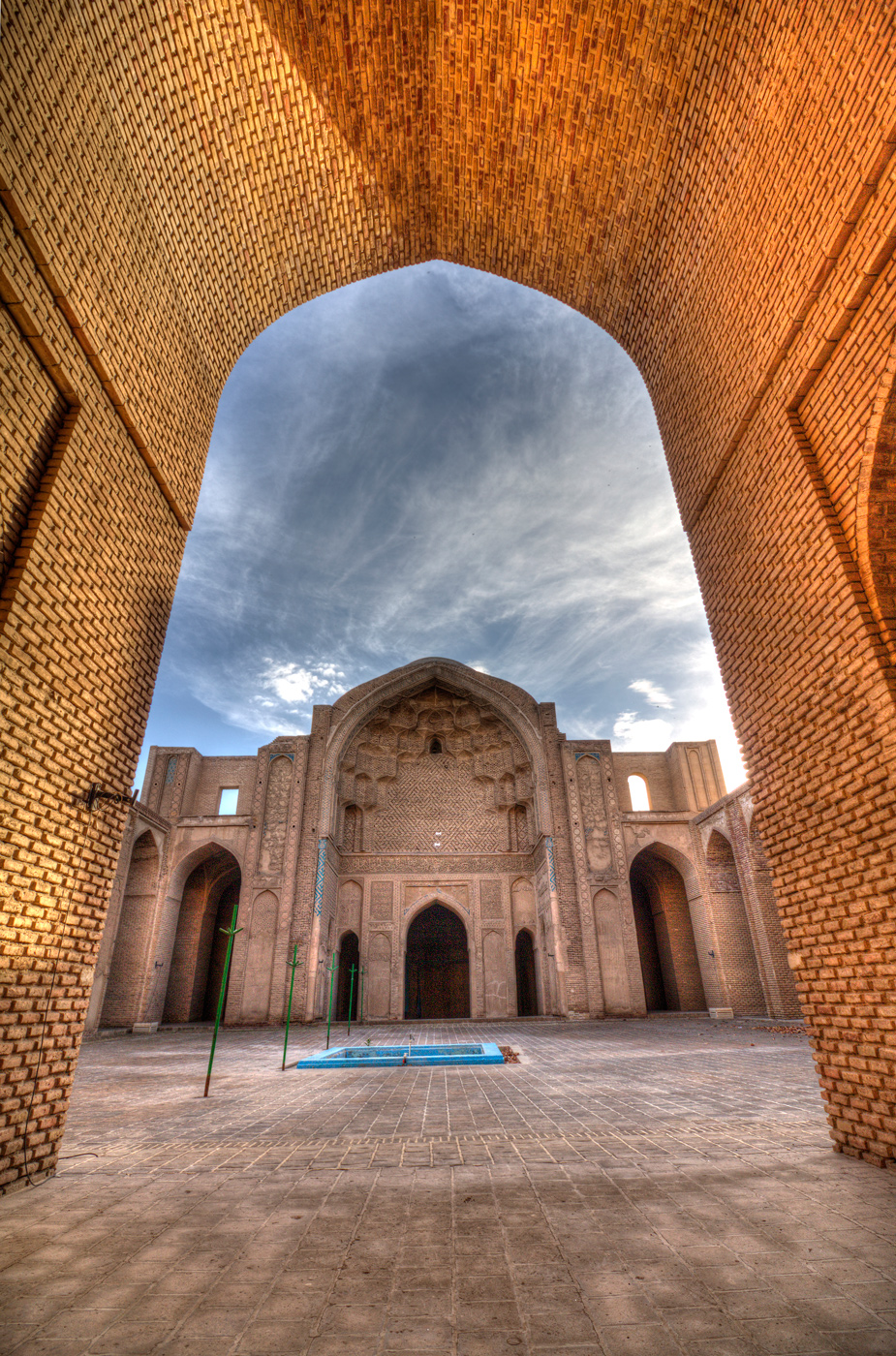
Jameh Mosque of Varamin

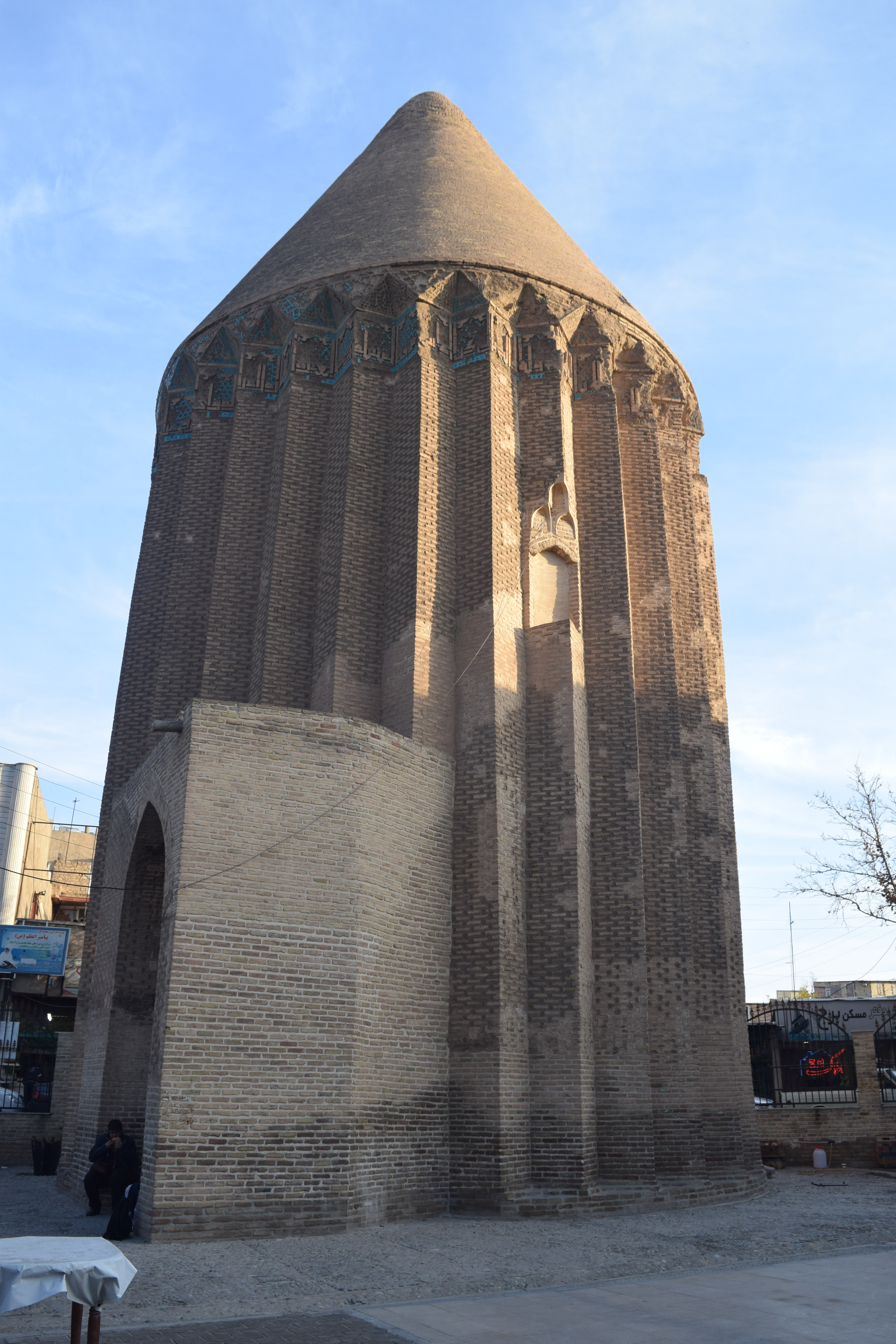
Aladdin Tower

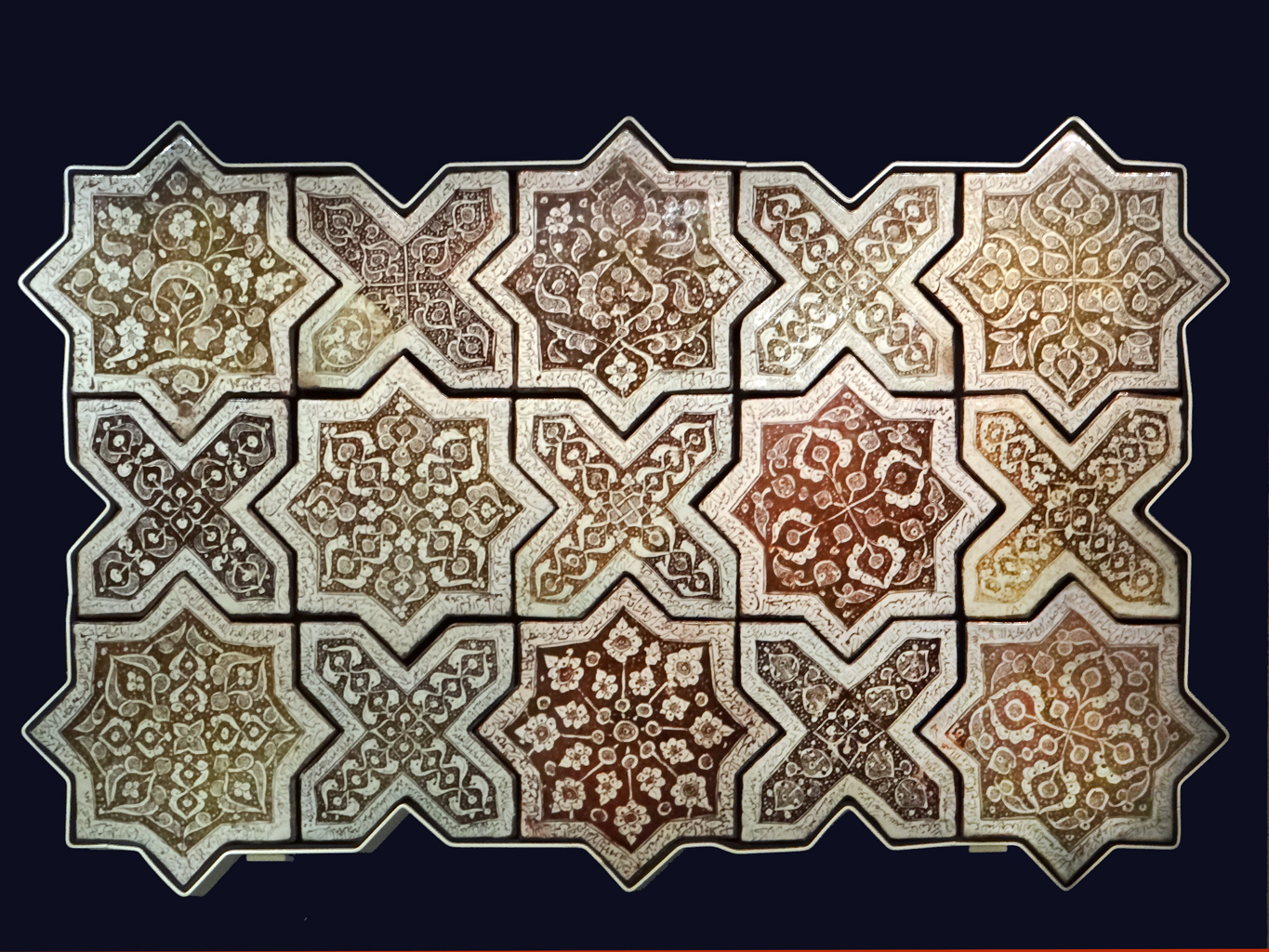
A set of tiles from Imamzadeh Yahya

=== Other sites ===
Other than above buildings, mausoleums of Hosein Reza, Sakinehbanu, Kowkab a-ddin, Seyyed Fathollah, and Zaid Abolhassan are other historical monuments. Additionally, historians have mentioned the Razaviyeh historical madrasah adjacent to the Jameh Mosque, also Varamin Castle, 1500 feet from the Jameh Mosque, has also been a noted by travelers, both the madrasah and citadel do not also exist today.

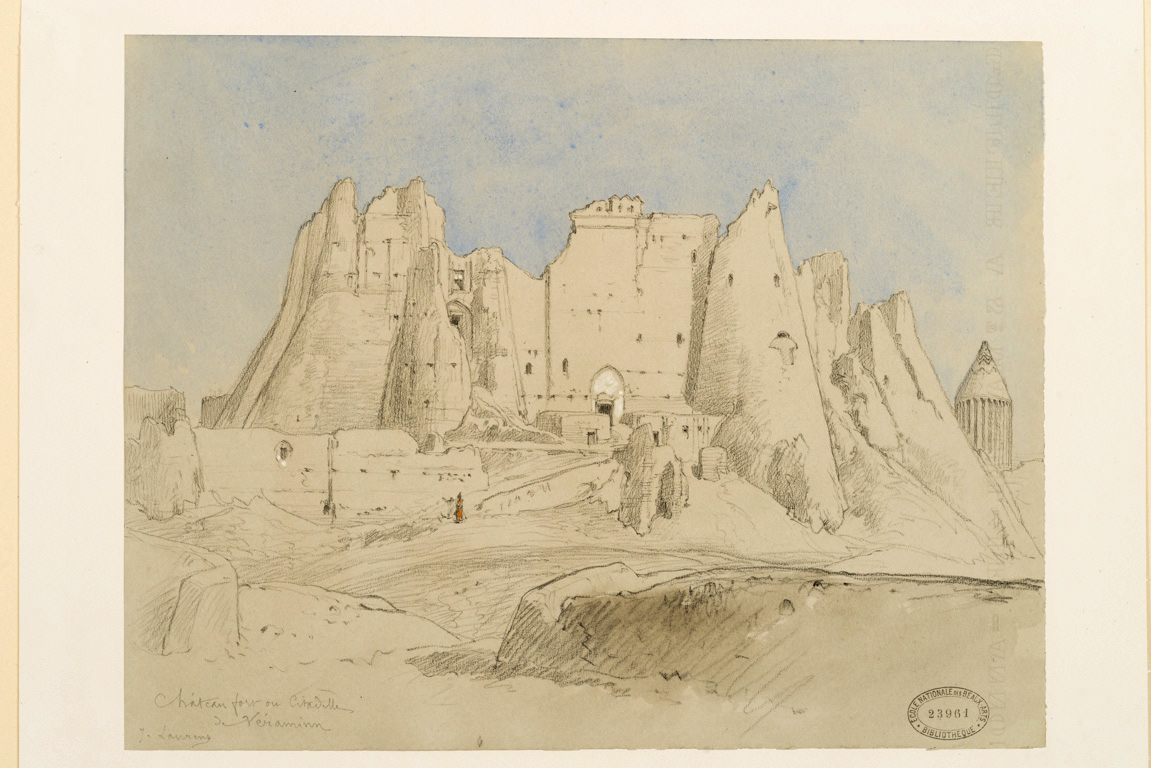
Citadel of Varamin drawn by Jules Laurens in 1848.

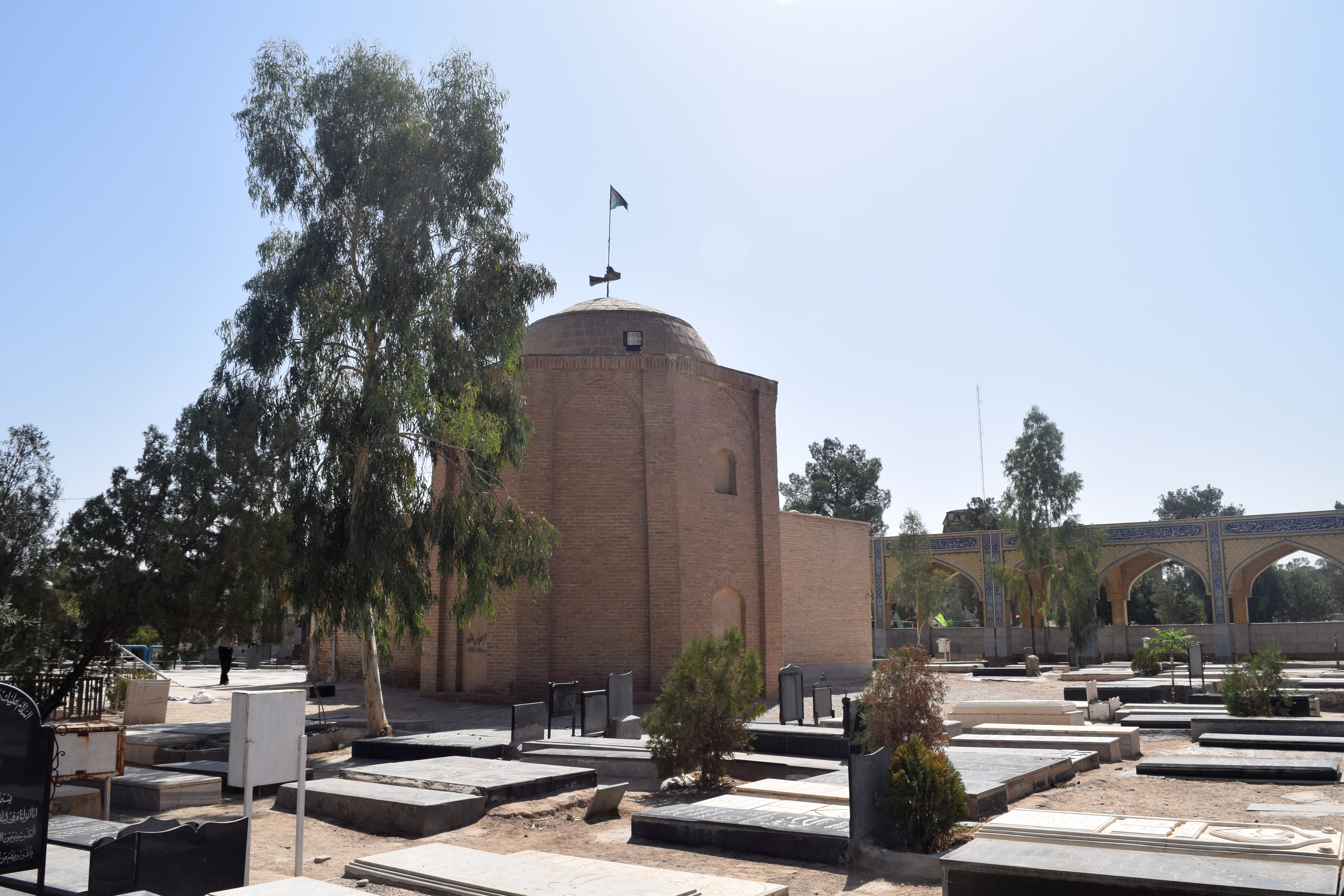
Imamzadeh Hosein Reza, built in 1437 CE.

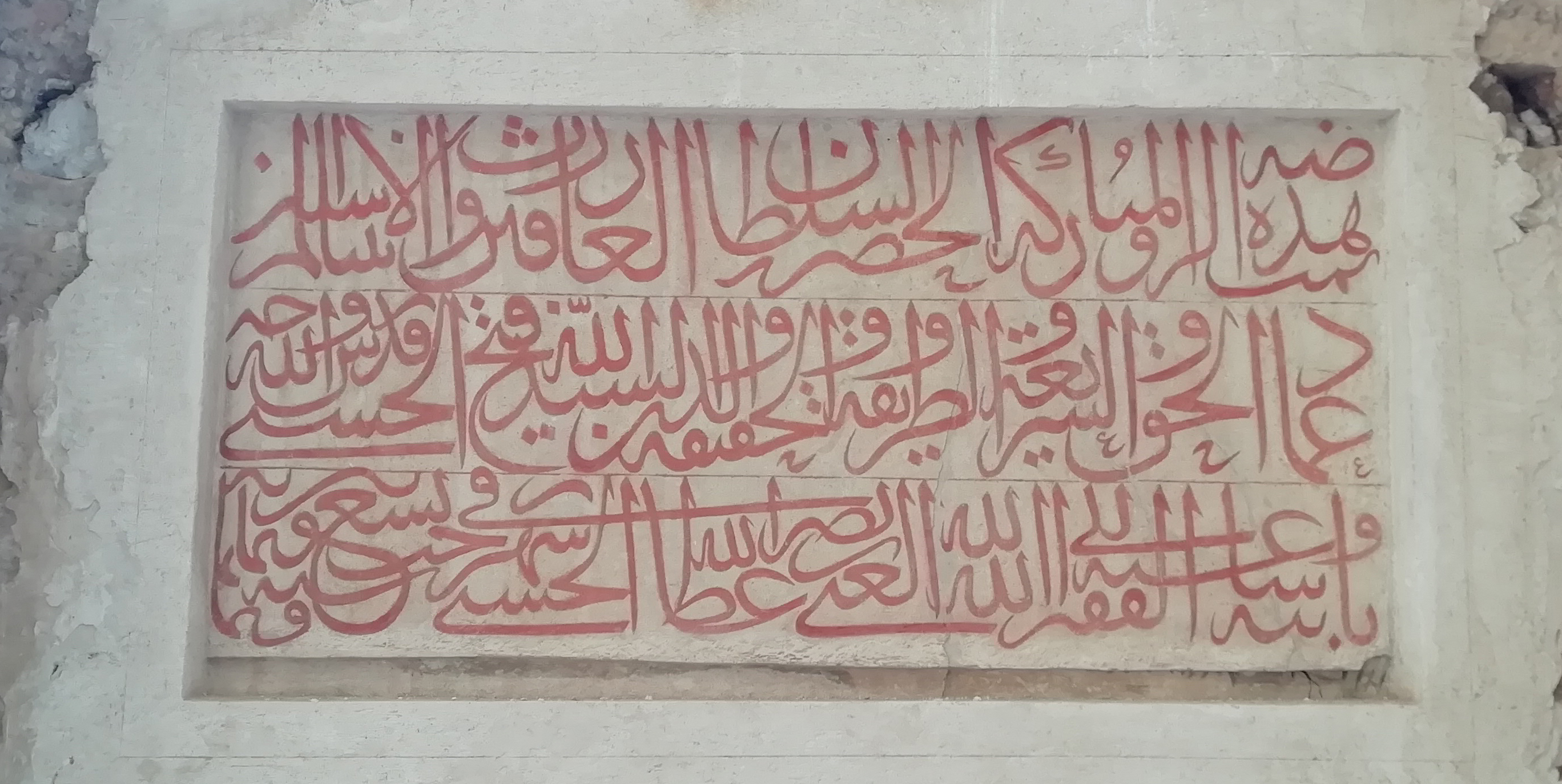
Inscriptions on Seyyed Fathollah's tomb, with the date 900 A.H. (1495 CE)

== Industries ==
=== Sugar refinery factory ===
Varamin Sugar Refinery Factory was built in 1934–1935 by Nikolai Markov and is the very first sugar refinery factory in Iran and Middle East. Since 2007 and privatization, its produce has been reduced because of shortage in ingredients.

=== Oil-extracting factory ===
Varamin Oil-extracting factory was built in 1938–1939 and is the first producer of vegetable oil in Iran.

== Handcrafts ==
=== Carpets and rugs ===
Carpets and rugs of Varamin are among most famous carpets in the world. Many rug and carpet experts see Varamins as purer Persian carpets. They have geometric patterns with repeated medallions, especially on runners. They are made by tribal people who either live in or pass by Varamin.

== Colleges and universities ==
=== Islamic Azad University ===
Islamic Azad University Varamin-Pishva Branch was established in 1985. This branch has more than 86 different majors and capacity of 15,000 students.

== See also ==
Media related to Varamin at Wikimedia Commons
