= Death of Abolfazl Amir-Ataei =

Iranian teenager killed in the Mahsa Amini protests

Abolfazl Amirataei (Persian: ابوالفضل امیرعطایی; January 4, 2006 – May 26, 2023) was a 16-year-old Iranian teenager who sustained critical injuries during the 2022 protests in Iran (Mahsa Amini protests) and died after approximately eight months of battling his injuries.

== Biography ==
Abolfazl Amirataei was born on January 4, 2006, and resided in Shahr-e Rey, Iran. He was a High School student in Varamin, specializing in industrial electricity. Beyond his academic pursuits, Abolfazl had a passion for learning languages, enjoyed playing football, and was an avid gamer. He was described as a cheerful, energetic, and sociable individual who had a deep affection for animals, especially dogs.

=== Injury During Protests ===
On September 21, 2022, amid nationwide protests in Shahr-e Rey, Abolfazl was shot in the head at close range by Islamic Republic of Iran security forces using a tear gas canister, causing severe injuries and the loss of half of his skull.

He was immediately transferred to Haft-e Tir Hospital in Tehran, where he underwent multiple surgeries and remained in a coma for several months. During his hospitalization, his family faced pressure from authorities, including demands to sign commitments not to file complaints against security forces in exchange for medical treatment.

=== Struggle with Injuries and Passing ===
After approximately five months in the intensive care unit, Abolfazl was moved home; however, his condition deteriorated, necessitating further surgeries. On May 21, 2023, he showed signs of emerging from the coma, such as moving his fingers and responding to his mother's voice. On May 26, 2023, after about eight months of enduring his injuries, Abolfazl died. His death added to the growing list of young individuals who were killed or injured during the protests in Iran, which began following the death of Mahsa Amini in September 2022.

== Reactions and Legacy ==
Abolfazl's death elicited widespread reactions both within Iran and internationally. Human rights organizations condemned the Iranian regime's treatment of protesters, particularly minors, and expressed concern over human rights violations in the country. Cases like Abolfazl's underscore the urgent need for reforms and the protection of civil rights in Iran.
