= Imamzadeh Hossein =

Imamzadeh Hossein may mean any of the following Shi'ite imamzadeh complexes:

- Imamzadeh Hossein, Qazvin, Iran
- Imamzadeh Hossein (Kordan), Iran
- Imamzadeh Hosein Reza, Iran
