= Bakhram =

Bakhram is a variant of the Persian male given name Bahram.

== Given name ==
- Bakhram Mendibaev (born 1983), Uzbekistani weightlifter, also known as Bahrom Mendibaev
- Bakhram Murtazaliev (born 1993), Russian professional boxer

== See also ==
- Verethragna or Bahram, a Zoroastrian yazata
