= Kanlidzha =

Kanlidzha may refer to:

- Marmashen, Armenia, formerly Verin Kanlidzha
- Vagramaberd, Armenia, formerly, Nerkin Kanlidzha
