= Byram =

Byram may refer to:

== Places ==
England

- Byram, North Yorkshire

United States

- Byram, Connecticut
- Byram, Mississippi
- Byram, New Jersey in Hunterdon County
- Byram Center, New Jersey in Sussex County
- Byram Township, New Jersey in Sussex County
- Byram Hills High School in Armonk, New York
- Byram River in New York and Connecticut

== People ==
- Byram (surname), includes a list of people with the surname

== Events ==
- Byram v. United States, a US federal tax law court decision
- Battle of Byram's Ford, US Civil War battle

== Geology ==
- Byram Formation in Alabama
- Byram Marl, a formation in Mississippi

== See also ==
- Behram (disambiguation)
