= Varane (disambiguation) =

Raphaël Varane (born 1993) is a French football centre-back.

Varane may also refer to:

- Varane (DR Congo footballer) (born 1993), Henock Inonga Baka, DR Congolese football centre-back
- Jonathan Varane (born 2001), French football midfielder
- Varane Avashyamund, 2020 Indian Malayalam-language romantic comedy film

== See also ==
- Varanes (disambiguation)
