= Vahram =

Vahram (Armenian: Վահրամ) is a variant name of the divinity Verethragna in Zoroastrianism. Variants are Vehram, Bahram, Behram, Balram, Barham.

Vahram is also a common given name for Armenian males. Vahramian, derived from Vahram, is an Armenian family name.

Vahram may refer to:

Given name

- Vahram Alazan (1903–1966), Armenian poet, writer
- Vahram Kevorkian (1887–1911), football player of Armenian descent
- Vahram Pahlavouni (967–1045), Armenian army commander (sparapet) and Prince in Bagratuni Armenia
- Vahram Papazian or Papazyan (1888–1968), Armenian actor classical actor
- Vahram Sahakian (born 1964), Armenian dramatist, film director and actor
- Vahram Sargsyan (born 1981), Armenian-Canadian composer and choral conductor
- Vahram Zaryan French-Armenian modern mime artist, dancer, director and choreograph

Family name

- Vartan Vahramian, Iranian-Armenian music artist and painter

Places

- Vahramaberd, a town in the Shirak Province of Armenia
- Vahramashen Church, a church in Armenia

== See also ==
- Bahram (disambiguation)
- Bahram (name)
- Balram
- Behram
- Megasthenes' Herakles
