= Imamzadeh Yahya =

Shi'ite mausoleum complex in Varamin, Tehran province, Iran

- امامزاده یحیی
- Imamzadeh Yahya

- Location of the complex in Iran

Religion
- Affiliation: Shia Islam
- Ecclesiastical or organisational status: Imamzadeh and mausoleum
- Status: Active

Location
- Location: Varamin, Tehran Province
- Country: Iran
- Interactive map of Imamzadeh Yahya
- Coordinates: 35°18′58″N 51°38′54″E

Architecture
- Architect: Islamic architecture
- Type: Ghaznavid (prime); Azeri; Seljuk; Ilkhanid
- Completed: 12th century CE (prime); 663 AH (1264/1265 CE) (tiles and mihrab); 707 AH (1307/1308 CE) (stucco)

Specifications
- Dome: One (maybe more)
- Materials: Brick; plaster; tiles

Iran National Heritage List
- Official name: Emamzadeh Yahya
- Type: Mausoleum
- Designated: 1933
- Reference no.: 199
- Conservation organization: Cultural Heritage, Handicrafts and Tourism Organization of Iran

The Imamzadeh Yahya (Persian: امامزاده یحیی, romanized: Emamzadeh Yahya) is a Shi'ite Islamic funerary complex and mausoleum, located in southern Varamin, in the province of Tehran, Iran. The complex contains the tomb of a sixth-generation descendant of Hasan ibn Ali.

Completed between c.659 AH (1260/1261 CE) and 706 AH (1306/1307 CE), during the Ilkhanate period, construction of the complex was funded by Fakhr al-Din, the local ruler of the Ray province when Varamin had been its capital, and others.

Fakhr al-Din was the protegé of the fourth Ilkhanate ruler Arghun Khan and invested heavily in the Imamzadeh, as he also shared heritage with Hasan ibn Ali. The tomb was constructed using extravagant, valuable materials and incorporates architectural elements that facilitate worship. Throughout the 19th and 20th centuries, tiles from the Imamzadeh Yahya were looted, and many are located today in museums around the world. Local residents and tourists pray at the site and use the courtyard as an event space.

The complex was added to the Iran National Heritage List on 31 July 1933, administered by the Cultural Heritage, Handicrafts and Tourism Organization of Iran.

== Plan, structure, and layout ==
Historical accounts describe the monument as including a grand entrance portal with arcades leading to a mosque and an octagonal tower with a conical roof. The octagonal tower, thought to be built before the Seljuk period, had flat interior niches and contained a blue plaster mihrab. The portal and arcades were built during the period of Seljuk rule but no longer exist.

Today, the site can reached off the Varamin-Tehran highway and the tomb enclosure is entered on the northern side. The exterior of the Imamzadeh is rectangular with a domed roof, enclosed by a low brick wall. At the entrance of the tomb is a neo-Safavid style portal accented with tiles in shades of blue and orange. This portal was added after the Iranian Revolution and includes calligraphy across the top that announces the site as the “Holy Shrine of Emamzadeh Yahya.” After passing through the portal, one arrives in a cemetery filled with tombstones that stand parallel to the qibla. Apart from the main entrance portal, there is a southern gate to the site that is approached from the neighborhood street.

The interior tomb is octagonal and formed with bricks. It was once decorated with painted stucco as well as luster tiles, highly prized mediums of the time that required valuable materials and cultivated skill to produce. The stucco decoration, which is still extant, includes text that wraps around the wall at the viewer’s eye level. It begins with the Qur’an 62:1–4, “glorifying God, His Messenger, and His Sacred Word,” includes the date, Muharram 707 (July 1307), and concludes with a hadith. This text frames the original location of the tomb’s luster mihrab on the qibla wall, which once was decorated with 50-60 handmade tiles. These tiles were commissioned from master ceramicists in Kashan between 1262 and 1305, who produced them for other features of the shrine such as the dado and cenotaph. The tiles were produced in a variety of shapes to decoratively fill the interior wall space, utilizing interlocking “star and cross” forms along the dado.

A cenotaph stands in the center of the chamber and is surrounded by a silver and gold zarih. Green fabric is attached to the zarih and divides the space on the right and left for men and women respectively. The luster cover for the cenotaph was created with the most expensive glazed ceramic of the time.

== Looting ==
The Imamzadeh Yahya has been looted over the last 100 years and the tiles are now spread throughout the world in museums. For example, a set of 160 tiles from the tomb is now in the British Museum, another set is in the Victoria and Albert Museum, and tiles from the gravestone are now in the Hermitage Museum in Saint Petersburg.

As of 2020, historian Dr. Keelan Overton suggests, the tiles are spread around the world in 30 museums, in cities such as Doha, St. Petersburg, Tbilisi, London, Oxford, Paris, Glasgow, Baltimore, Chicago, Los Angeles, Tokyo, and probably even Tehran. Looting is common in many Middle Eastern sacred sites and occurred in the 19th and early 20th century and into the present. Scholar Tomoko Masuya details the looting surrounding the Middle East as occurring in two parts. She asserts that many Persian tiles such as the ones at Imamzadeh Yahya were stolen from 1862/63-1875 and 1881-1900. According to Masuya, the tiles from Imamzadeh Yahya were stolen during the first phase of 1862/63-1875 where they were systematically removed and sold throughout Europe and the United States. Although some pieces still survive today, for example, the Mihrab from the shrine of luster tiles is at the Shrine Museum in Mashhad.

Presently, the qibla in the Imamzadeh Yahya is without a mihrab. The tiles are currently on display at the Shangri La Museum of Islamic Art, Culture & Design in Honolulu. The mihrab includes a depressed central panel crowned with stucco trefoil arches above a cursive inscription panel. The trefoil arches are surrounded by a cursive band. Surrounding these panels are pilasters in high relief that support a gabled arch. The pilasters are adorned with helical floral designs in blue and white, and there are calligraphic inscriptions along the gables of the arch. Within the portals of the trefoil arch and gabled arch, as well as in their spandrels are red, white, black, and blue arabesque designs. There are calligraphic inscription columns on both sides of these panels, which are themselves bordered by another set of pilasters supporting a gabled arch. The whole composition is enclosed in calligraphic inscriptions with a stylized floral edge.

== Present use of tomb ==
Local residents actively pray at the Imamzadeh Yahya, and an attendant of the tomb is present to greet visitors. Worshippers who visit the tomb interact with the zarih by touching it, kissing it, praying against it, offering money through the holes in the screen, and adorning it. Shi’a believers regard Imamzadeh Yahya’s personality as resonant in the tomb, meaning that prayers performed in the space are likely to yield positive outcomes. This reputation has attracted the attendance of many Afghan immigrants who have moved to Varamin.

Visitors have added and maintained additional decorations to the space. Fairy lights and garlands hang on the walls. The cenotaph holds a mirror, candlesticks, and a Quran. Visitors place paper bills around the floor. Textile elements such as carpets and pillows decorate the space and serve a functional use for visitors. Also present are filled bookshelves, mirrors, framed artwork, and flowers. Prayer stones made with sacred soil of Karbala are available for Shi’a prayer. One’s forehead must touch these stones as they prostrate themselves.

The large, pale indent in the wall where the mihrab once stood is often adorned by printed and drawn signs made by local visitors. Some are tilted right to indicate the direction of Mecca, or explain in text that worshippers should angle themselves twenty degrees. Another sign describes the genealogy of Imamzadeh Yahya. On either side of the void is a collage of four images that includes views of the entire complex and photographs of the tomb’s tiles on display. However, during holidays like Ashura, these hangings may be substituted with relevant banners and decorations.

The Imamzadeh Yahya is regarded as the most important Imamzadeh in Varamin county and has been the focus of renovation within the past few years alongside many other urban shrines. The courtyard is used commonly by locals as park space for picnics, and some visit the graves of family members who have been buried there. It is also used as a general event space. Varamin officials have made efforts to promote the site’s historical significance, which appeals to locals as well as tourists. In 2015, the Imamzadeh was a pilgrimage destination for the observance of Arbaeen.

== Gallery ==
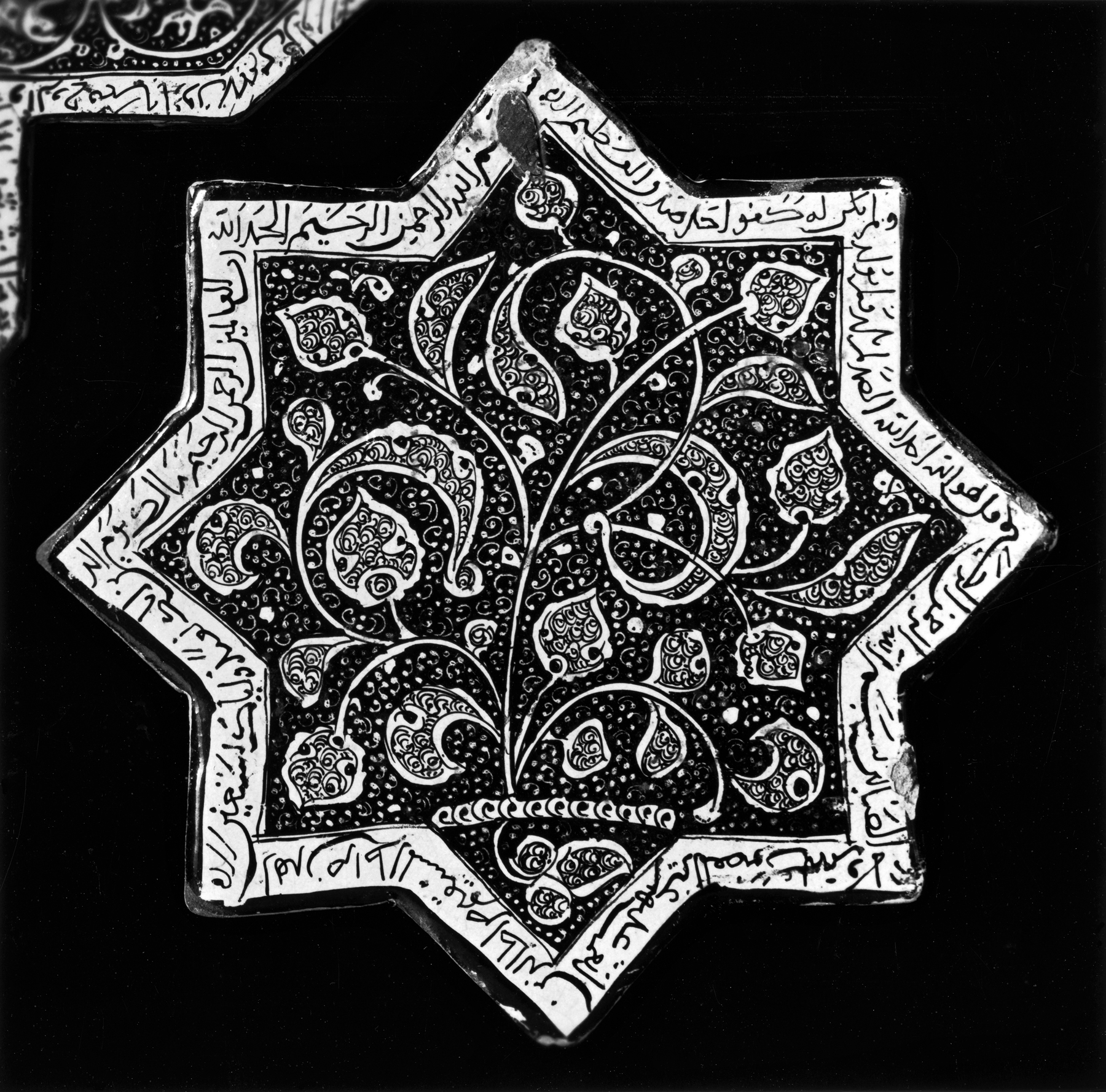
Tile works now kept in Walters Museum, Baltimore, Maryland

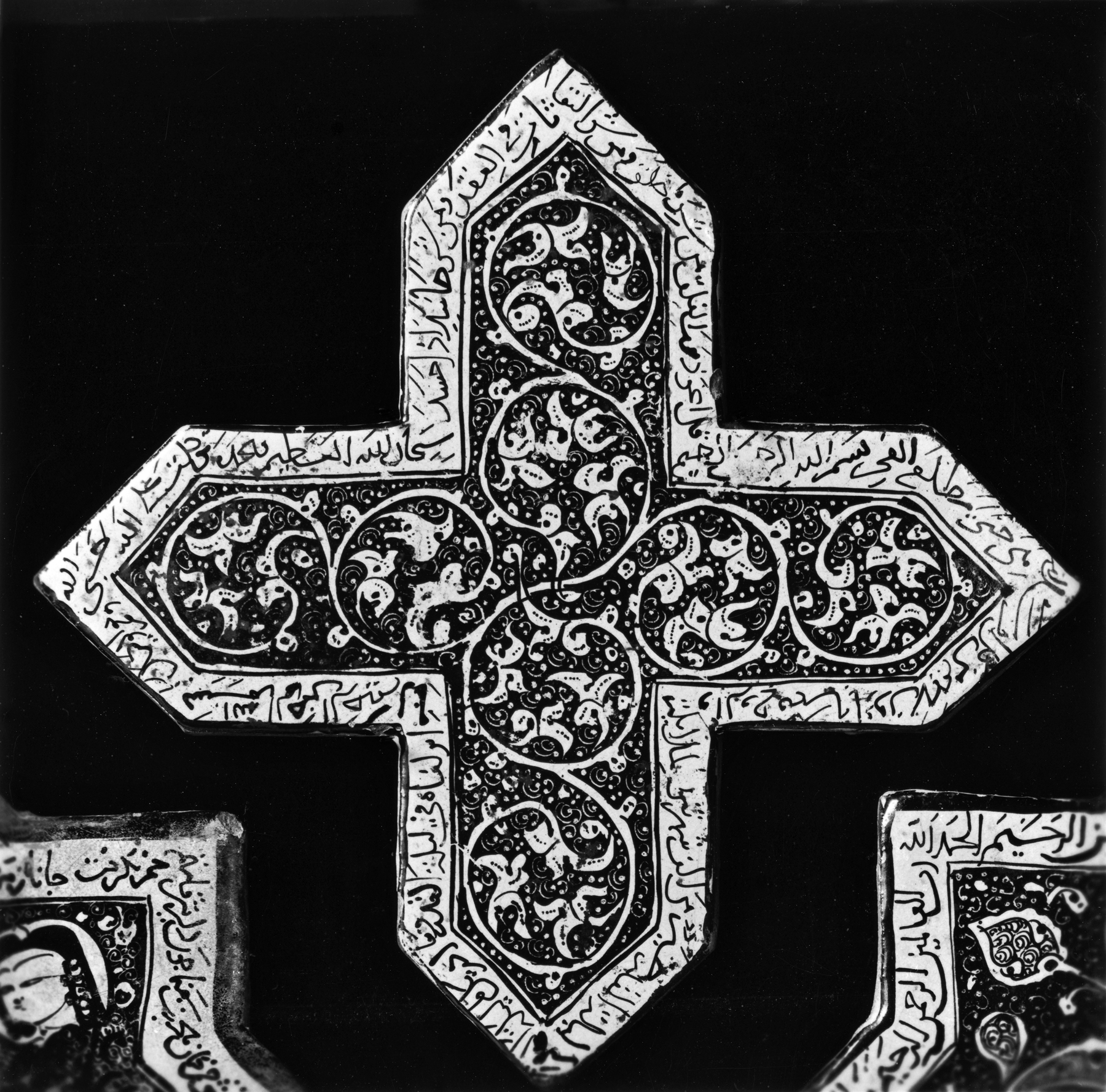
Tile works now kept in the Walters Museum, Baltimore

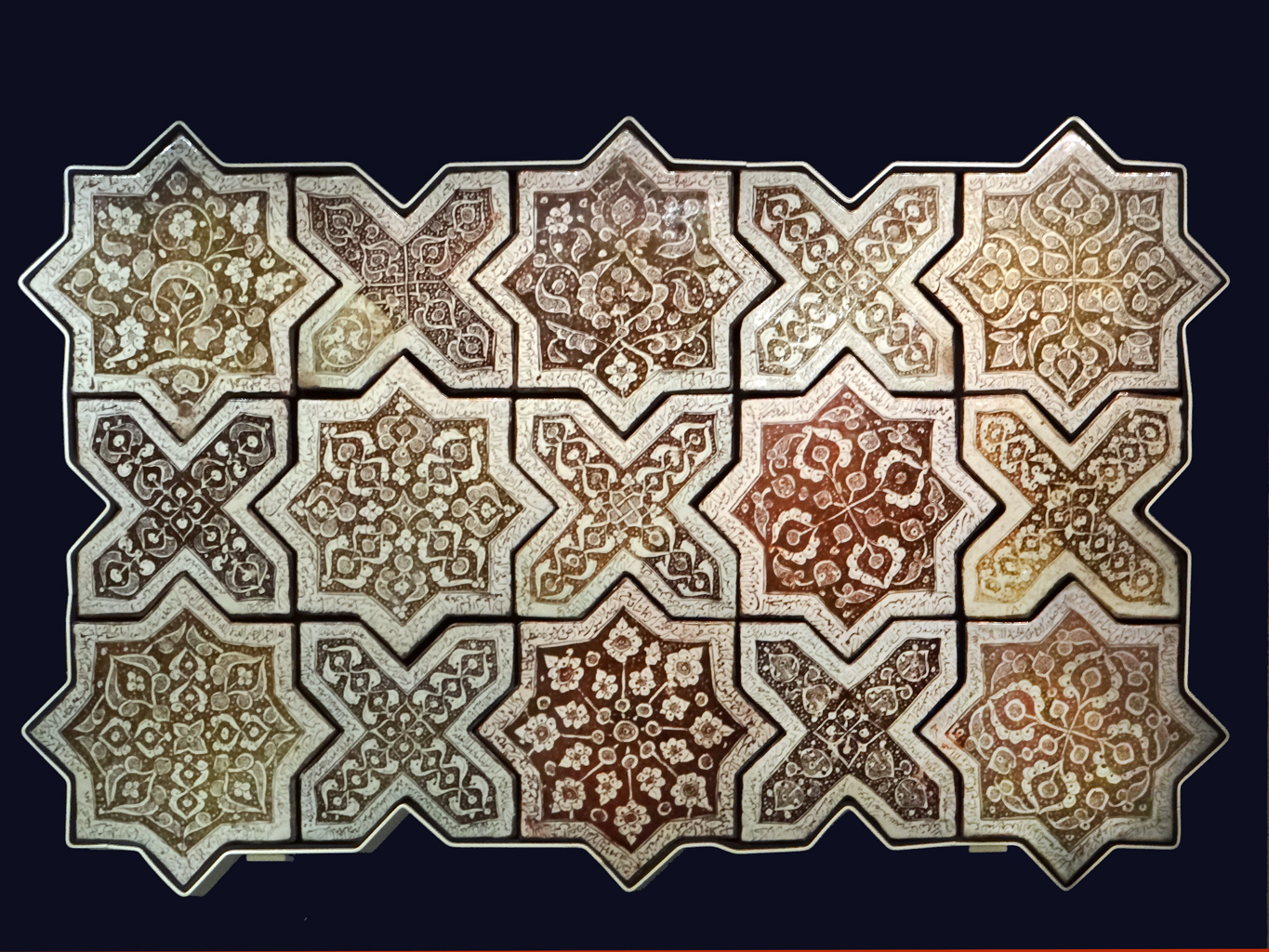
Tile works now kept in Victoria and Albert Museum, London, United Kingdom

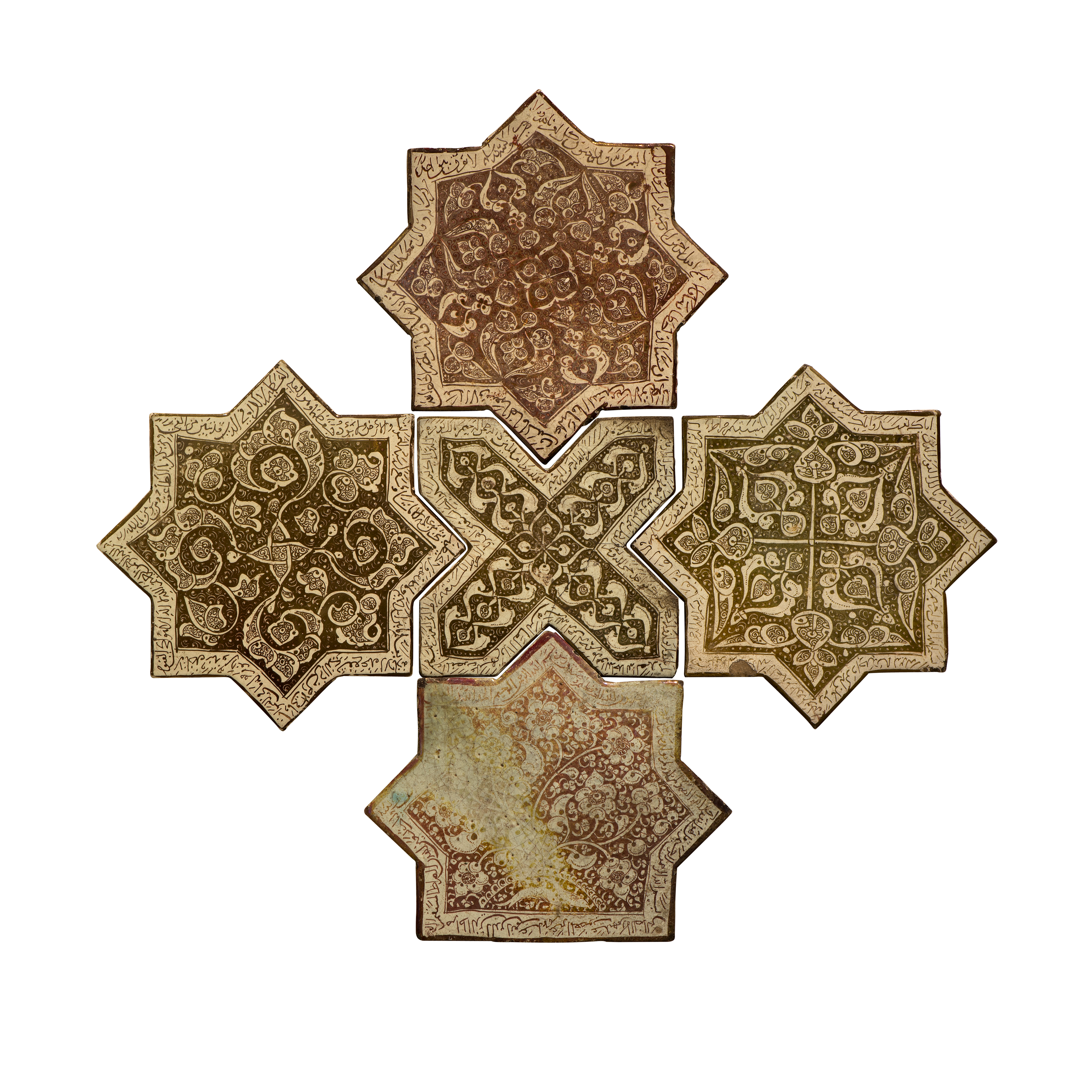
Tiles Museum für Kunst und Gewerbe Hamburg, Hamburg, Germany

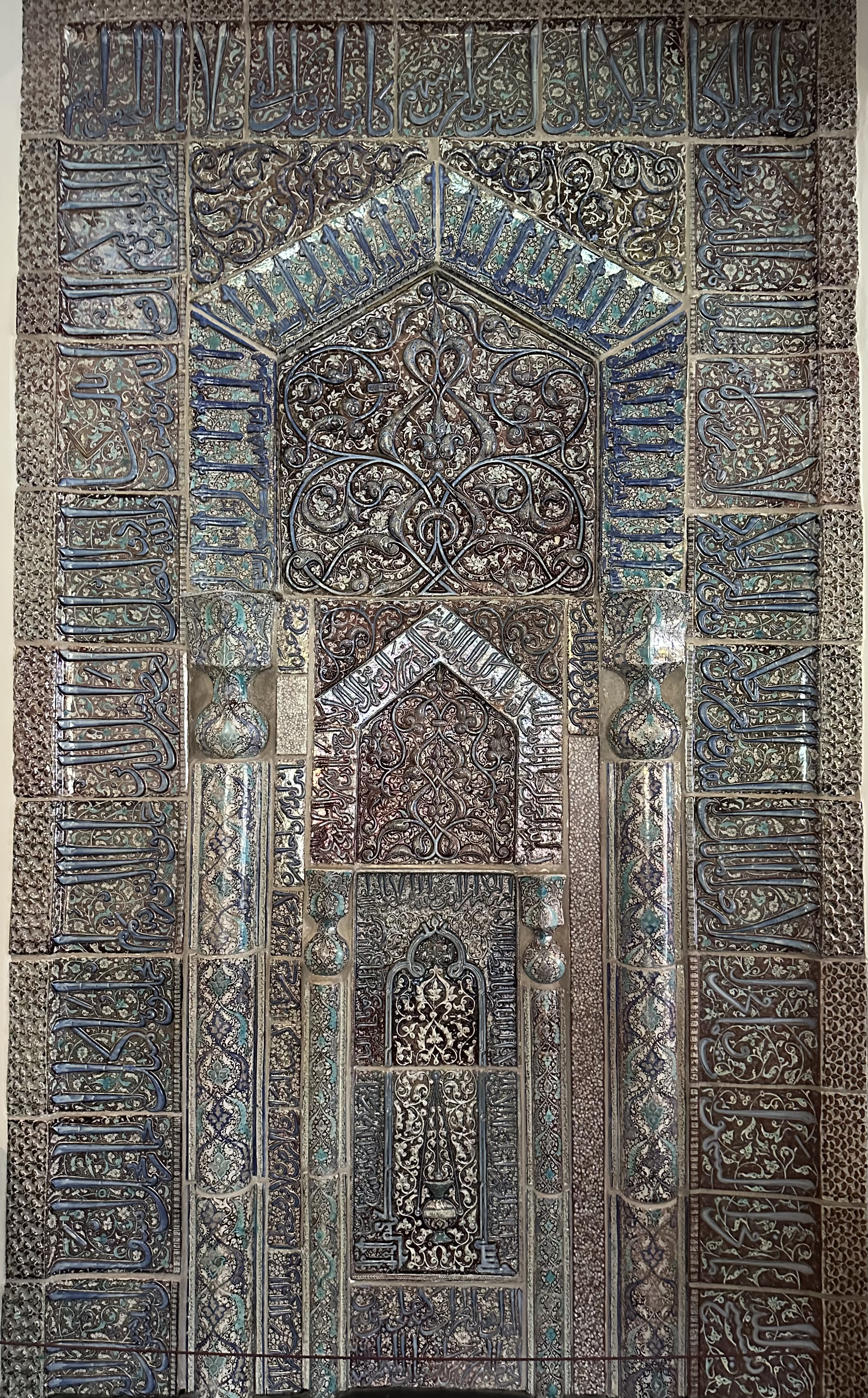
Mihrab in Shangri La, Honolulu, Hawaii

== See also ==
- List of imamzadehs in Iran
- List of mausoleums in Iran
- Shia Islam in Iran
