= Bahrami (surname) =

Bahrami (Persian: بهرامی) is a Persian-origin surname. The word is a derivative of the male given name Bahram with the relative suffix i (/ī/; Persian: "ی")

Notable people with the surname include:

- Ameneh Bahrami (born 1978), Iranian acid attack victim
- Farahnaz Bahrami (born 1962), Norwegian politician
- Hossein Bahrami (born 1995), Iranian football player
- Mahdi Bahrami (born 1994), Iranian computer programmer
- Mansour Bahrami (born 1956), Iranian tennis player
- Mohammad Bahrami (1898–1957), Iranian politician
- Mohammad Amin Bahrami (born 1997), Iranian football player
- Sara Bahrami (born 1983), Iranian actress
- Zahra Bahrami (1965–2011), Iranian political prisoner

Also:

- Aidin Nikkhah Bahrami (1982–2007), Iranian basketball player
- Samad Nikkhah Bahrami (born 1983), Iranian basketball player

== See also ==
- Bahrami (disambiguation)
