= Jameh Mosque of Varamin =

Mosque in Varamin, Tehran province, Iran. Iranian national heritage site

Jāmeh Mosque of Varāmīn
- مسجد جامع ورامین
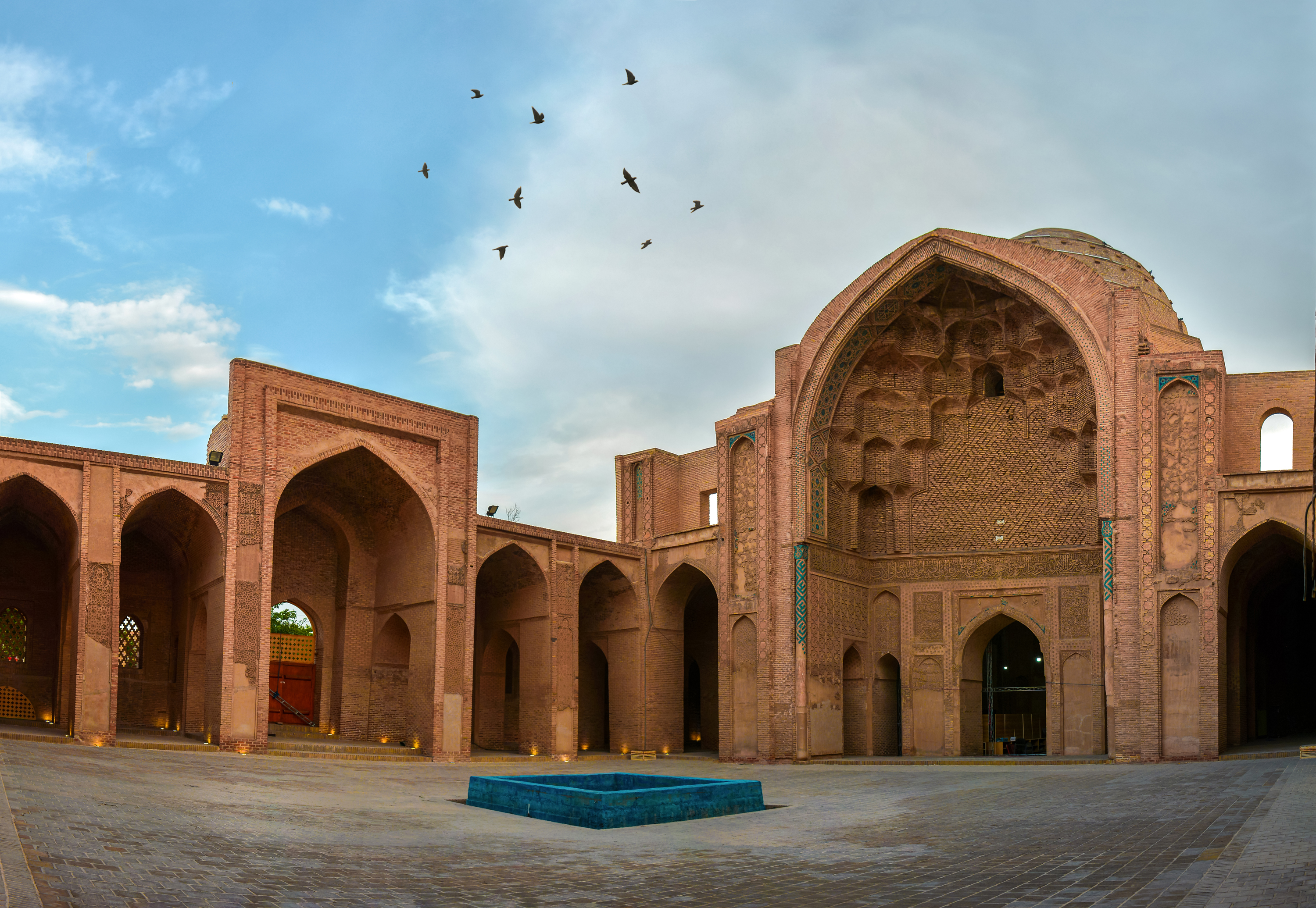
- View from inner courtyard

- Location of the mosque in Iran

Religion
- Affiliation: Shia Islam
- Ecclesiastical or organisational status: Friday mosque
- Status: Active; occasional use

Location
- Location: Varamin, Tehran province
- Country: Iran
- Coordinates: 35°19′N 51°39′E

Architecture
- Architect: Ali Qazvini
- Type: Mosque architecture
- Style: Ilkhanid; Timurid
- Founder: Izz al-Din al-Quhadhi
- Completed: 722 AH (1322/1323 CE)

Specifications
- Length: 66 m (217 ft)
- Width: 43 m (141 ft)
- Dome: One
- Dome height (outer): 23.5 m (77 ft)
- Dome dia. (outer): 10.5 m (34 ft)
- Materials: Bricks; plaster; tiles
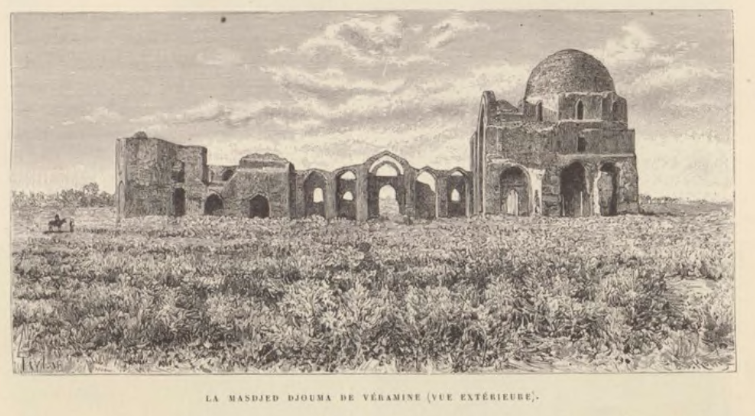
- Drawing by Jane Dieulafoy, 1881

Iran National Heritage List
- Official name: Friday Mosque of Varamin
- Type: Friday Mosque
- Designated: 1932
- Reference no.: 176
- Conservation organization: Cultural Heritage, Handicrafts and Tourism Organization of Iran

The Jāmeh Mosque of Varāmīn (Persian: مسجد جامع ورامین, romanized: Masjed-e-Jāme-e Varāmīn) (Note: Other various names include the Congregational Mosque of Varamin, the Friday Mosque of Varamin, and the Grand Mosque of Varamin.) is a Shi'ite Friday mosque (jāmeh) located in Varamin in the Tehran province of Iran.

The mosque is one of the oldest buildings in the city of Varamin. Its construction began during the reign of Sultan Mohammad Khodabaneh and was completed in 722 AH (1322/1323 CE) during the rule of his son, Abu Sa'id Bahadur Khan. The mosque comprises a shabestan, a portico, a large brick dome, an adjacent structure beside the shabestan, ten small arches, and one large central arch.

The mosque was added to the Iran National Heritage List on 6 January 1932, administered by the Cultural Heritage, Handicrafts and Tourism Organization of Iran.

== History and restorations ==
In the sixth century AH, the family of Abu Sa'd Varamini, a wealthy Shia family from that era, built a mosque in Varamin. However, the current structure was constructed in 722 AH (1322/1323 CE) by the order of Izz al-Din al-Quhadhi. The dome was added in 726 AH (1325/1326 CE). Apparently, the mosque was damaged due to a disaster, and in 816 AH (1413/1414 CE), Amir Yusef Khajeh ordered the building to be restored. After that, it was not maintained for 500 years. Jane Dieulafoy, who visited the mosque during the Qajar era, noted that no one prayed there because the local peasants feared the dome might collapse — yet 'infidel foreigners' were allowed to observe it freely and without restriction. It was excavated by archaeologists in the 1960s and 1970s and was restored in the 1980s.

== Architecture ==
The plan of the building is a rectangle measuring approximately 66 by 43 metres (217 by 141 ft). The mosque is located in the middle of an urban square. It has a rectangular plan and no other building is attached to it. Three exterior walls have a designed facade, but not the south-front. The mosque has a four-iwan plan and includes an entrance in the north, a shabestan in the south, porches in the east and west. Mohammad Karim Pirnia categorizes the building as an example of Azeri-style architecture. The entrance to the mosque is tall and elongated, similar to other Ilkhanid buildings and is decorated with intricate tiles. The mosque's dome sits atop a square chamber measuring 10.5 by 10.5 metres (34 by 34 ft), per side. It transitions into an octagonal shape, then a hexagon, and finally forms a dome with the aid of squinches. The dome, the walls, even the squinches are decorated with bricks, tiles and plaster. Pirnia believes that the dome originally had two shells; the upper shell was destroyed, leaving only the lower shell intact. The eastern porch serves as an auxiliary entrance, in contrast to the main entrance. The western porch, however, lacks an entrance and consists of two rows of columns. This portico was completely destroyed and was rebuilt during recent restorations of the building.

== Gallery ==
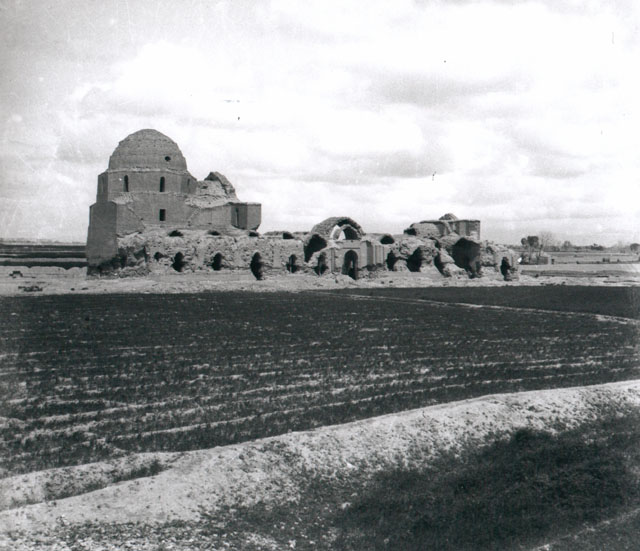
Photograph by Robert Byron, 1935

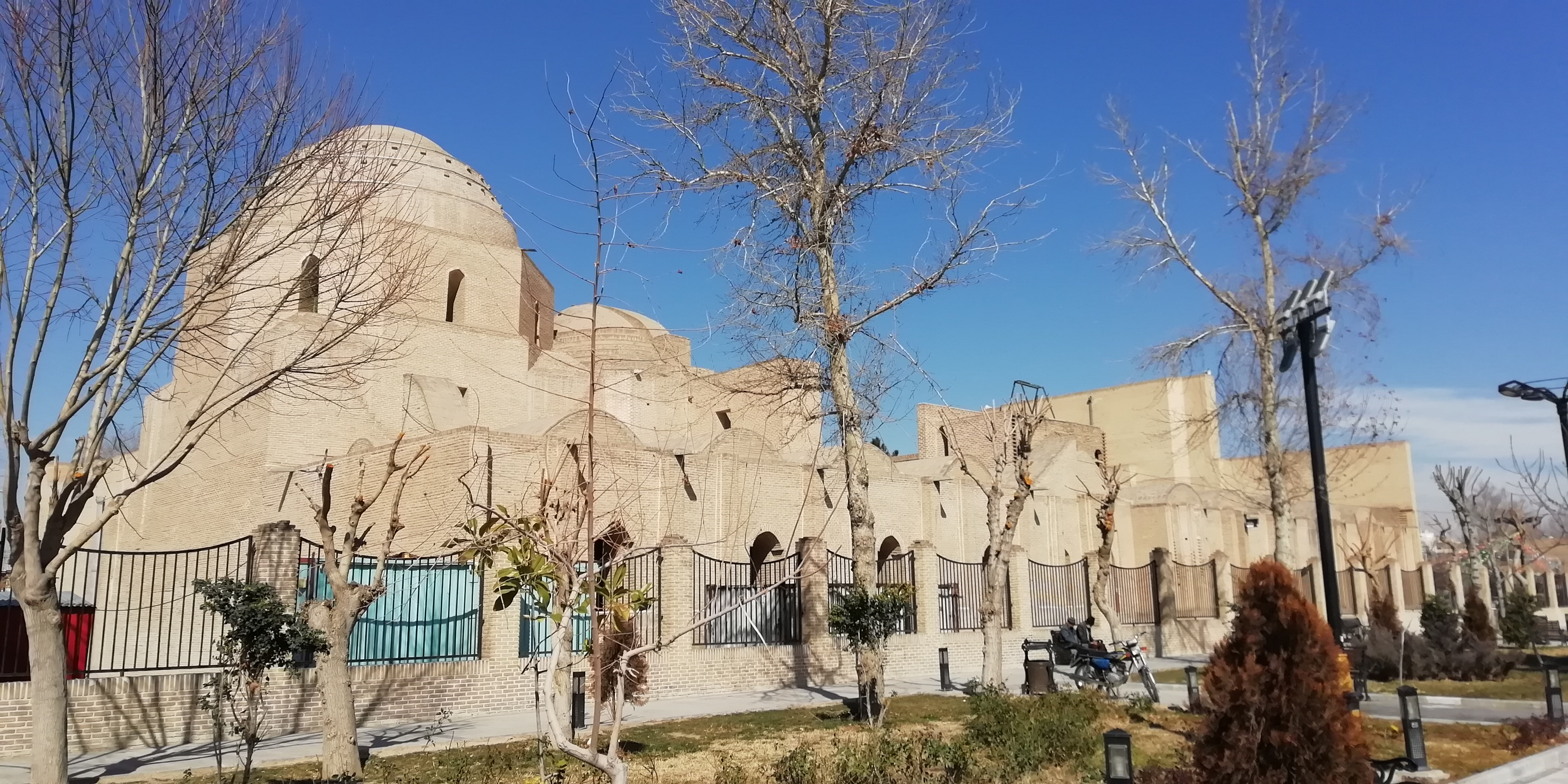
In 2022

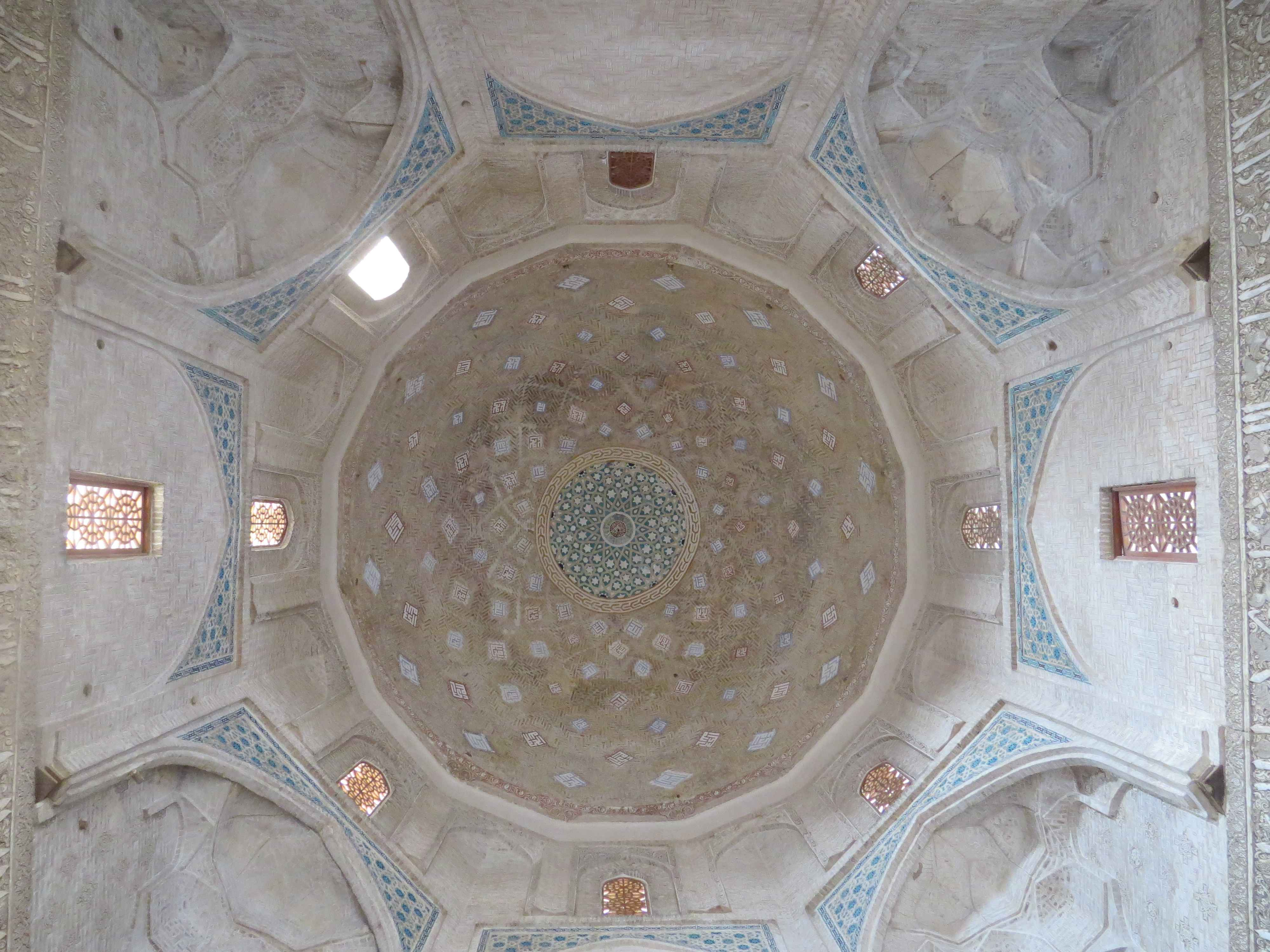
The dome

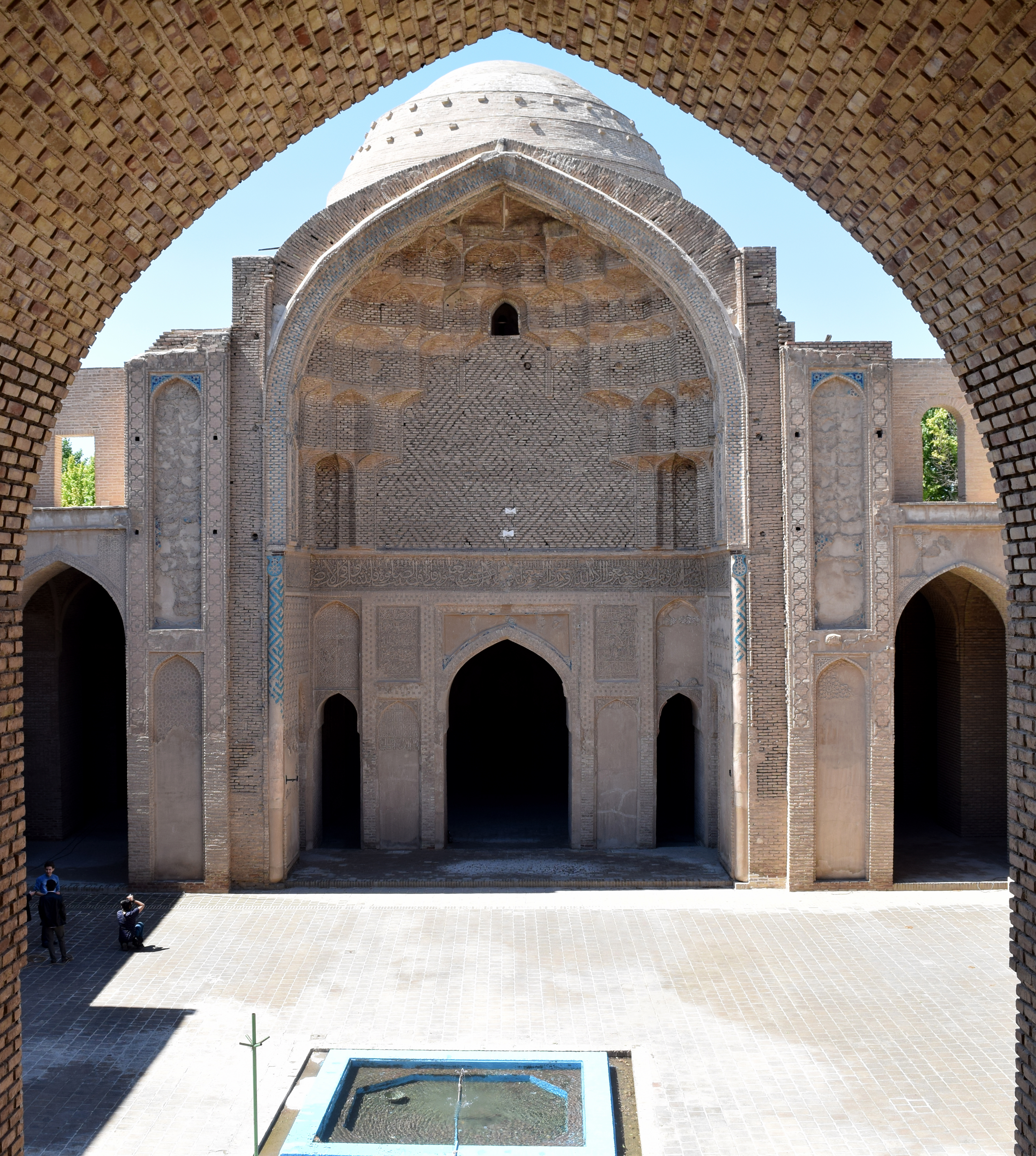
View from the room above the entrance

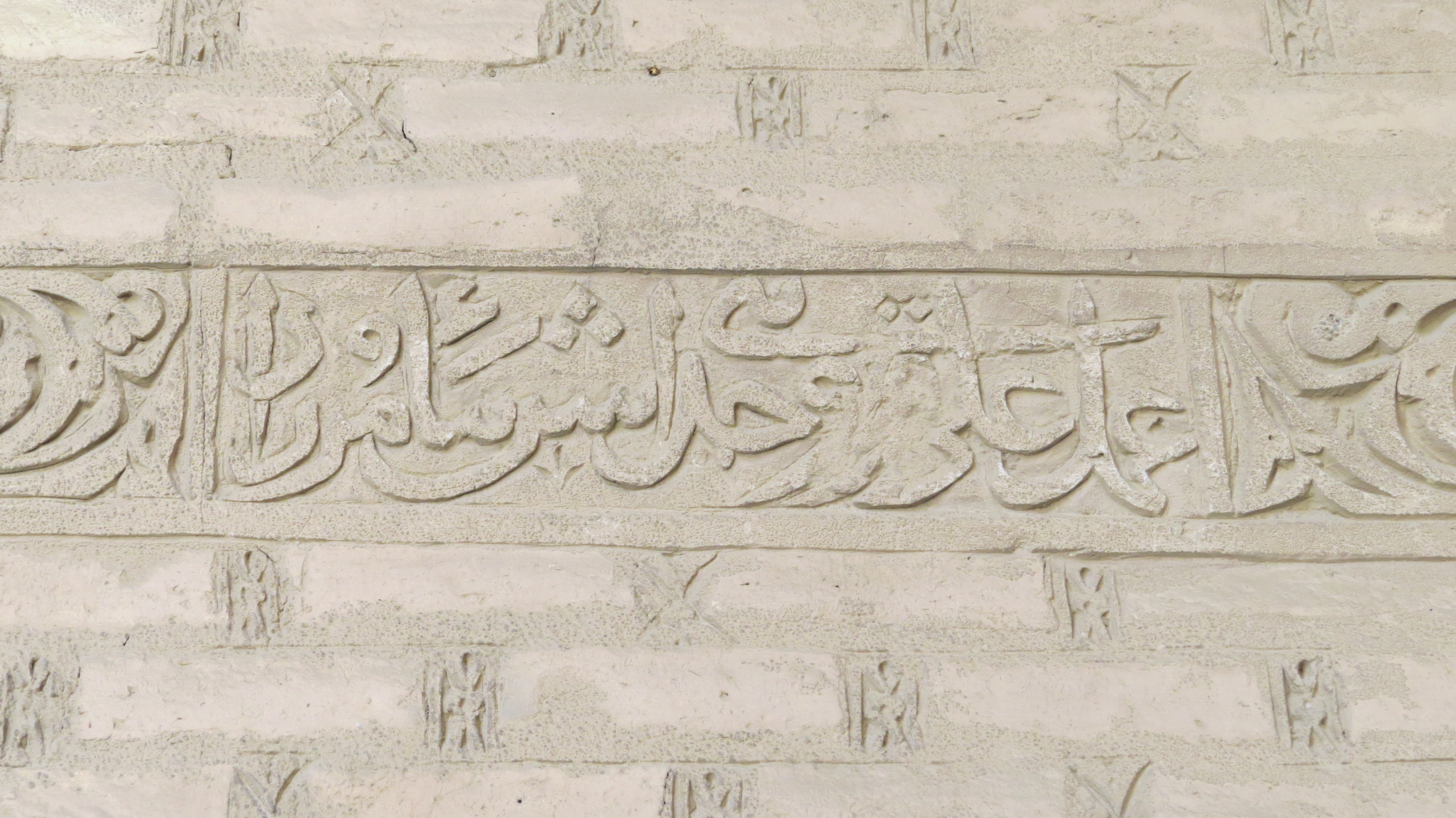
"'Amal-i 'Ali Qazvini ḫudāyaš Biyāmurzād"
(Inscription on the eastern porch: "Work of Ali Qazvini, May his God forgives him")

== See also ==
- Shia Islam in Iran
- List of mosques in Iran
- Persian domes
