= Bahram =

Bahram (Persian: بهرام), is an Iranian name, originating from the Zoroastrian divinity Bahram, and may refer to:

- Bahram (name)
- Bahram (Shahnameh), a heroic character in the Iranian epic poem Shahnameh
- Bahram (horse), the 1935 Triple Crown Champion of British Thoroughbred Racing
- Bahram, Iran (disambiguation), several places
- Bahram, a fictional army of Martian rebels in the Zone of the Enders franchise

== See also ==
- Behram (disambiguation)
- Bihram, a Mandaean celestial being and given name
- Vahram (disambiguation)
- Behram Khan, a 1946 Indian film about the Mughal commander Bairam Khan
