= Aladdin Tower =

Mausoleum and tower in Varamin, Tehran, Iran

Aladdin Tower (Ala od-Dowleh Tower)
- برج علاءالدین (برج علاءالدوله)
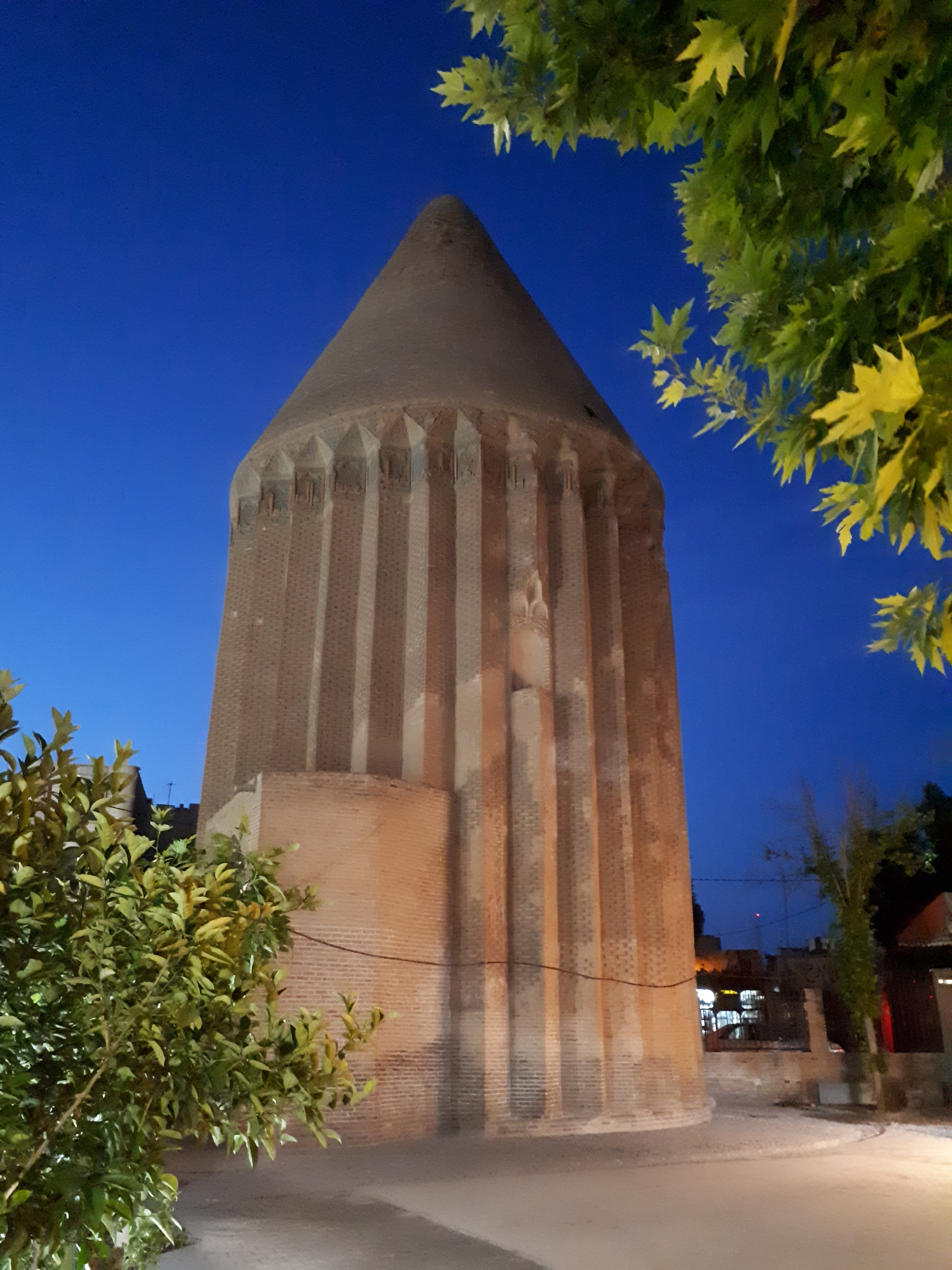

- Location of the mausoleum in Iran

Religion
- Affiliation: Islam
- Ecclesiastical or organisational status: Mausoleum
- Status: Active

Location
- Location: Varamin, Tehran province
- Country: Iran
- Coordinates: 35°19′31″N 51°38′50″E

Architecture
- Type: Islamic architecture
- Style: Azeri; Ilkhanid
- Completed: 688 AH (1289/1290 CE)

Specifications
- Height (max): 26.71 m (87.6 ft)
- Dome: One
- Monument: One: 'Ala ad-din
- Materials: Bricks; mosaic tiles
- Elevation: 990 m (3,248 ft)
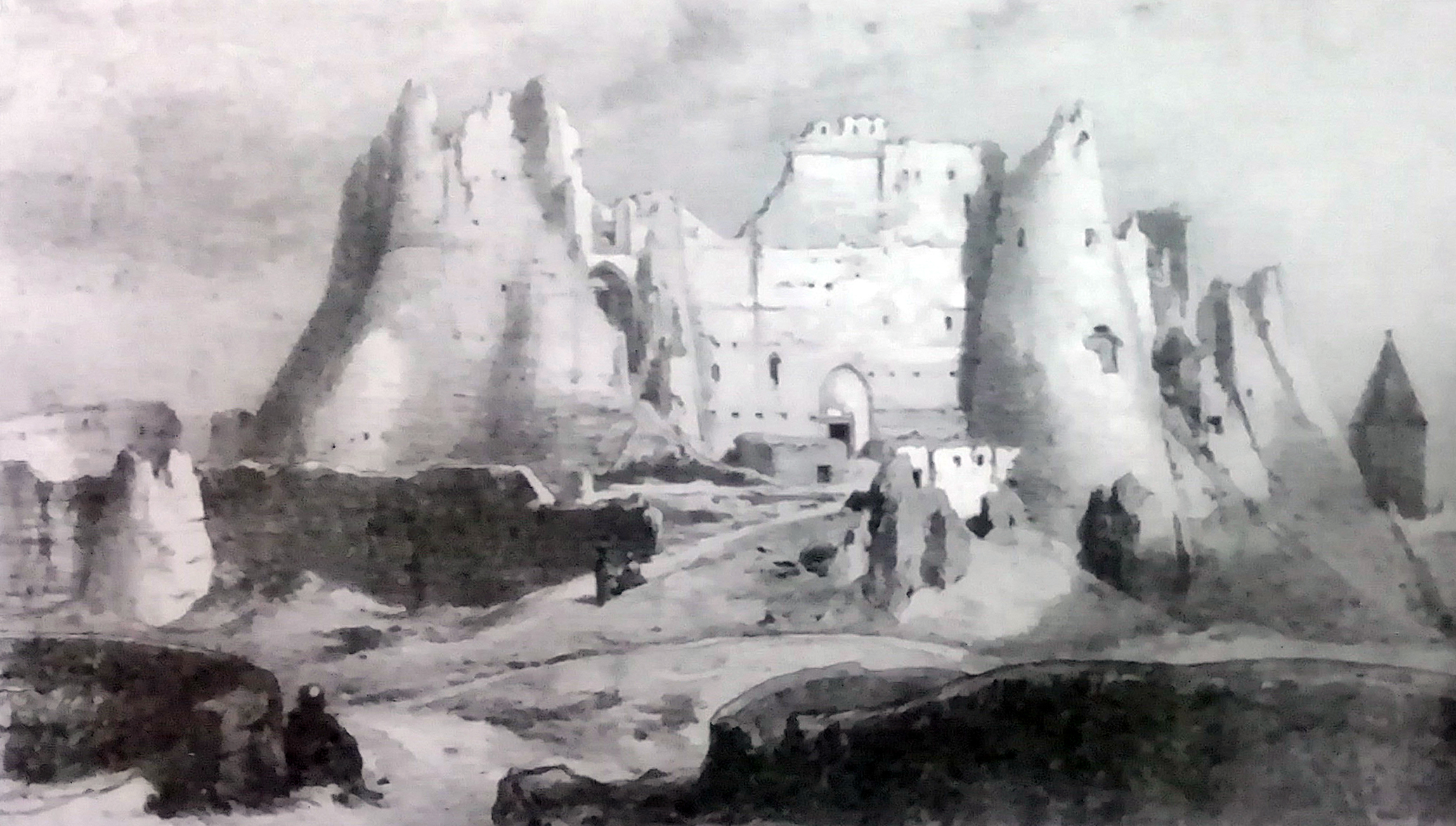
- 1848 etching of Varamin by Jules Laurens, showing the tower, far right

Iran National Heritage List
- Official name: Mausoleum of Aladdin
- Type: Mausoleum
- Designated: 1932
- Reference no.: 177
- Conservation organization: Cultural Heritage, Handicrafts and Tourism Organization of Iran

The Aladdin Tower (Persian: برج علاءالدین), also known as the Aladole Tower (Persian: برج علاءالدوله) and as Gunbad-i Ala al-Din (Persian: گنبد علاءالدین, lit. 'Dome of Aladdin'), is a mausoleum and tower built over the tomb of its patron, located in the centre of Varamin, in the province of Tehran, Iran. The structure was completed in 688 AH (1289/1290 CE), during the Ilkhanid era.

The mausoleum was added to the Iran National Heritage List on 6 January 1932 and is administered by the Cultural Heritage, Handicrafts and Tourism Organization of Iran.

== History ==
The tomb tower of 'Ala ad-din was completed in 1289 CE during the Ilkhanid era and is located to the north of Varamin, a small town 42 kilometres (26 mi) south of Tehran. It continues a well-established Iranian tradition of funerary architecture in the form of a tomb tower, its earliest precedent being the Seluk monument Gunbad-i Qabus, completed in 1006 CE. This type of mausoleum began as a tall cylinder with a canonical roof, marking, through sheer verticality, the grave of its patron (often a minor dynast, amir, or isfahasalar). The tomb tower puts more emphasis on the exterior, as opposed to the interior, of the sacred space, in contrast to the domed square mausoleum, the other predominant type of mausoleum in Iran.

== Architecture ==
The tomb is a cylindrical triacontadigonal tower in the inside and a thirty-two right-angled triangular flanges or columns on the outside. Made of high-quality baked bricks assembled in a hazarbaf (decorative brickwork, literally meaning "thousand weaving") decorative pattern, the flanges ascend from the plinth until they meet the cornice that supports the conical roof with corbelled groin arches. Between the upper end of the flanges and the small groin arches above them runs an inscription band paralleling the zigzag shape of the flanges. The cornice displays fine tile work alternating between unglazed and glazed terracotta in light blue. As with most tomb towers, the tomb tower of 'Ala ad-Din has a double-shell dome, conical on the exterior and spherical on the inside, above the circular interior plan.

The structure is 26.71 metres (87.6 ft) high on the exterior and 16.11 metres (52.9 ft) inside. The diameter of the structure is 12.14 metres (39.8 ft) on the exterior and 8 metres (26 ft) inside.

Recent restoration of the tomb tower has preserved the interior brick dado and floor, as well as addressing the rebuilding of the lower flanges, the canonical roof, and the restoration of the northern and southwest entrances. The main northern entrance is a semicircular arched portal embedded in a pointed arch niche whose walls merge into the flanges. The southwest portal comprises two pointed arches, one on top of the other; both are plastered and filled with stalactites.

With its decorative work comprising glazed tile mosaic and bricks juxtaposed to a substantial quantity of unglazed brickwork, the tomb tower of 'Ala ad-din is considered a representative example of the more austere tilework of the period.

== See also ==
- List of mausoleums in Iran
- List of towers in Iran
- Islam in Iran
