= Mahmudiyeh-ye Bahrami =

Mahmudiyeh-ye Bahrami محموديه بهرامي
- Village
- Location within Iran
- Coordinates: 30°32′26″N 56°02′11″E
- Country: Iran
- Province: Kerman
- County: Rafsanjan
- Bakhsh: Central
- Rural District: Azadegan

Population (2006)
  - Total: 337
- Time zone: UTC+3:30 (IRST)
  - Summer (DST): UTC+4:30 (IRDT)

Mahmudiyeh-ye Bahrami (Persian: محموديه بهرامي, also Romanized as Maḩmūdīyeh-ye Bahrāmī and Maḩmūdīyeh Bahrāmī; also known as Mahmūdi, Maḩmūdīyeh, and Moḩammadī) is a village in Azadegan Rural District, in the Central District of Rafsanjan County, Kerman Province, Iran. At the 2006 census, its population was 337, in 76 families.
