= Behram =

Behram may refer to:

- A male Persian name meaning the hypostasis of victory
- A male Mandaic name, also spelled Bihram
- Angel of victory in Zoroastrianism
- Atash Behram, a Zoroastrian place of worship

== People ==
- Bairam Khan (1501–1561), Mughal military commander and statesman
- Behram Abduweli (born 2003), Chinese footballer
- Behram Contractor (1930–2001), Indian journalist
- Behram Khan (cricketer) (born 1987), Pakistani cricketer
- Behram Kurşunoğlu (1922–2003), Turkish physicist
- Behram Pasha (1811–1882), British general who served as an Ottoman pasha
- Behram Zülaloğlu (born 1982), Turkish footballer
- Dastur Peshotan Behramji Sanjana, Indian scholar and Zoroastrian head-priest
- Fozia Behram, Pakistani politician
- Keki Byramjee Grant (1920–2011), Indian cardiologist
- Thug Behram (died 1840), Indian serial killer

== Places ==
- Behram, Ayvacık
- Behram (crater), an impact crater on Saturn's moon Enceladus
- Behramkale, the modern site of ancient Assus in Turkey

== See also ==
- Bahram (disambiguation)
- Vahram (disambiguation)
- Bayram (disambiguation)
- Byram (disambiguation)
- Behram Khan, a 1946 Indian film about the Mughal commander
