= Byram v. United States =

Court of Appeal Decision on Land

- Court: United States Court of Appeals for the Fifth Circuit
- Full case name: Byram v. United States
- Decided: May 31, 1983
- Citation: 705 F.2d 1418 (5th Cir. 1983)

Case history
- Prior history: 555 F.2d 1234 (5th Cir. 1977)

Court membership
- Judges sitting: John Minor Wisdom, Thomas Gibbs Gee, Thomas Morrow Reavley

Case opinions
- Majority: Gee, joined by Wisdom, Reavley

Laws applied
- Internal Revenue Code

Byram v. United States, 705 F.2d 1418 (5th Cir. 1983) is a Fifth Circuit Court of Appeals decision that helps determine when a sale of land will result in a capital gain for purpose of the U.S. Federal income tax.

== Facts ==
Taxpayer John D. Byram sold seven pieces of real estate in 1973. All transactions were initiated by the purchases; he did not subdivide the land, and spent minimal time and effort. From 1971 to 1973 Byram sold 22 parcels of real estate for a gross return of over $9 million and a net profit of $3.4 million.

== Issue ==
Were the properties held for investment purposes (allowing capital gains treatment) and not primarily for sale to customers in the ordinary course of his trade or business?

== Holding ==
The Court of Appeals for the Fifth Circuit affirmed the holding of the District Court. The properties were held for investment purposes and not primarily for sale to customers in the ordinary course of his trade or business and therefore warranted capital gains treatment under Internal Revenue Code sections 1201 and 1202.

== The Fifth Circuit Court's reasoning ==
• Byram made no personal effort to initiate the sales, he did not advertise, he did not have a sales office, he did not enlist the aid of brokers, he did not improve or develop the land, and he devoted minimal time and effort to the transactions.
• The court determined that the standard for review from the district court's finding must be accepted unless it is clearly erroneous
• The district court did not clearly err in determining that 22 sales in 3 years were not sufficiently frequent or continuous to compel an inference of intent to hold the property for sale rather than investment
• Substantial and frequent sales activity standing alone has never been held to be automatically sufficient to trigger ordinary income treatment
• A court should avoid placing too much weight on duration of ownership where other indicia of intent to hold the property for sale are minimal in order to follow Congressional intent.

== Notes ==
• Capital Asset: property held by the taxpayer not including property held primarily for sale to customers in the ordinary course of the taxpayer's trade or business

7 Pillars of Capital Gain Treatment
(1) the nature and purpose of the acquisition of the property and the duration of the ownership;
(2) the extent and nature of the taxpayer's efforts to sell the property;
(3) the number, extent, continuity and substantiality of the sales;
(4) the extent of subdividing, developing, and advertising to increase sales;
(5) the use of a business office for the sale of the property;
(6) the character and degree of supervision or control exercised by the taxpayer over any representative selling the property; and
(7) the time and effort the taxpayer habitually devoted to the sales.

== Importance ==
The takeaway from this case, and the reason it is important to everyday investors, is that Byram demonstrated that if you want to sell property AND obtain favorable capital gains treatment, it is essential that you consider the 7 Pillars of Capital Gain Treatment and attempt to stay on the “Byram” Side of the line. If you begin to deviate, such as having a business office, or subdividing the land, or spending a significant amount of time and effort on sales, the court may disallow capital gains treatment on the sale of property.

See also capital gain
