= Beyram, West Azerbaijan =

Beyram بيرم
- Village
- Location within Iran
- Coordinates: 36°36′44″N 45°49′41″E
- Country: Iran
- Province: West Azerbaijan
- County: Mahabad
- Bakhsh: Khalifan
- Rural District: Kani Bazar

Population (2006)
  - Total: 292
- Time zone: UTC+3:30 (IRST)
  - Summer (DST): UTC+4:30 (IRDT)

Beyram (Persian: بيرم, also Romanized as Beyrām; also known as Bahrām) is a village in Kani Bazar Rural District, Khalifan District, Mahabad County, West Azerbaijan Province, Iran. At the 2006 census, its population was 292, in 41 families.
