= Bakhrom Khamroyev =

Uzbek lawyer, human rights defender (b. 1963/64)

- Baxrom Xamroyev

Personal details
- Born: 1963 or 1964 (age 61–62) Uzbek SSR, Soviet Union (now Uzbekistan)

Bakhrom Mardonovich Khamroyev (also Khamroev, Uzbek: Бахром Мардонович Хамроев, Baxrom Mardonovich Xamroev; born 1963/64) is an Uzbekistan-born lawyer and human rights defender. On May 23, 2023, a Russian court sentenced him to 14 years in prison for justifying and participating in activities of the Islamic Hizb ut-Tahrir movement designated as terrorist in Russia and extremist in a number of other countries. He was initially charged for Facebook posts supporting . He was previously a member of Memorial. He is also known for providing legal assistance in Russia to labor migrants from Central Asia.

In September 2016, the Federal Security Service (FSB) conducted a raid at his home. All of his technical equipment and documents were confiscated. Khamroyev was detained and interrogated at the FSB headquarters.

On February 24, 2022, the day of Russia's invasion of Ukraine, Khamroyev was again detained. In May 2023, he was sentenced to 14 years for "online calls for terrorism and organizing a terrorist group's activities". According to Memorial, Khamroyev is being persecuted for his consistent human rights activities.

In January 2024, he was reportedly severely beaten by prison authorities in Vladimir Central Prison.

Khamroyev used to come to court proceeding with posters protesting the Russian invasion of Ukraine and the persecution of dissidents.
