= Bahrami-ye Sofla =

Bahrami-ye Sofla بهرامي سفلي
- Village
- Location within Iran
- Coordinates: 28°31′51″N 57°48′02″E
- Country: Iran
- Province: Kerman
- County: Jiroft
- Bakhsh: Central
- Rural District: Eslamabad

Population (2006)
  - Total: 189
- Time zone: UTC+3:30 (IRST)
  - Summer (DST): UTC+4:30 (IRDT)

Bahrami-ye Sofla (Persian: بهرامي سفلي, also Romanized as Bahrāmī-ye Soflá; also known as Bahrāmī and Bahrāmī-ye Pā’īn) is a village in Eslamabad Rural District, in the Central District of Jiroft County, Kerman Province, Iran. At the 2006 census, its population was 189, in 38 families.
