= Bahram (name) =

- Gender: Male
- Language: Persian

Origin
- Meaning: "victorious", "smiting of resistance"

Other names
- See also: Vahram, Behram, Bahrom

Bahram (Persian: بهرام), also spelled Behram or Vahram, is a masculine Persian given name of Iranian origin. It derives from the name of the ancient Iranian deity of victory, Avestan Vərəθraγna, through Middle Persian Warahrān and Wahrām. The underlying Iranian word originally conveyed the sense of "smiting resistance", and hence "victorious" or "victory".

The Middle Persian form Wahrām (also Warahrān; Middle Persian: 𐭥𐭫𐭧𐭫𐭠𐭭) was the name of the Zoroastrian divinity Verethragna, the personification of victory. In Middle Persian astronomical and astrological usage, Wahrām was also the name of the planet Mars.

Variants of the name include Uzbek and Tajik Bahrom (Uzbek: Баҳром; Tajik: Баҳром).

== Given name ==
- Bahram, a figure in the Shahnameh
- Bahram I (died 274), Sasanian king
- Bahram II (died 293), Sasanian king
- Bahram III, Sasanian king
- Bahram IV (died 399), Sasanian king
- Bahram V (c. 400–438), Sasanian king
- Bahram Chobin (died 591), Sasanian military commander and ruler
- Bahram VII (died 710)
- Bahram Gushnasp, 6th-century Sasanian military commander
- Bahram-i Mah Adhar, 6th-century Sasanian official
- Bahram ibn Ardashir al-Majusi (died 986), Buyid official
- Bahram ibn Mafinna, 11th-century Buyid vizier
- Bahram ibn Shahriyar (died 1122), Bavandid prince
- Bahram al-Da'i, 12th-century Nizari Ismaili leader in Syria
- Bahram al-Armani (died 1140), Fatimid vizier
- Bahram Khan (died 1337), governor in Bengal
- Bahram Beg (died 1501), Shirvanshah
- Bahram Mirza Safavi (1517–1549), Safavid prince
- Bahram Mirza (died 1882), Qajar prince
- Bahram Alivandi (1928–2012), Iranian-born Austrian artist
- Bahram Akasheh (1936–2025), Iranian geophysicist and seismologist
- Bahram Beyzai (1938–2025), Iranian film director and playwright
- Bahram Radan (born 1979), Iranian actor
- Bahram Nouraei (born 1988), Iranian musician
- Dawlat Wazir Bahram Khan, Bengali poet and vizier

== Surname ==
- Pantea Bahram (born 1970), Iranian actress

== Related forms ==
- Ardashir II, also known as Ardashir Vahram
- Muiz ud din Bahram (1212–1242), Sultan of Delhi
- Valon Behrami (born 1985), Swiss footballer

== See also ==
- Bahrami (surname)
- Bahrom
- Vahrām
- Varanes (disambiguation)
