= Bahrom Norqobilov =

Uzbek statesman

Bahromjon Torayevich Norqabilov

Chairman of the State Committee for Veterinary and Livestock Development of the Republic of Uzbekistan
- Incumbent
- Assumed office January 24, 2020

Chairman of the Intergovernmental Council for Cooperation in the Field of Veterinary Medicine of the CIS Member States
- Incumbent
- Assumed office October 22, 2020

Personal details
- Born: 1973 (age 52–53) Kamashi District, Kashkadarya Region, Uzbek Soviet Socialist Republic
- Education: Samarkand State University of Veterinary Medicine, Animal Husbandry and Biotechnology

Bahromjon Torayevich Norqabilov (born in 1973, Kamashi District, Kashkadarya Region, Uzbek Soviet Socialist Republic) is an Uzbek statesman, head of the State Committee for Veterinary and Livestock Development of the Republic of Uzbekistan.

== Biography ==
Bahrom Norqabilov was born in 1973 in Qamashi district of Kashkadarya region. In 1995, he graduated from Samarkand Agricultural Institute (now Samarkand State University of Veterinary Medicine, Animal Husbandry and Biotechnology).

From 2014 to 2017, he was the head of the State Veterinary General Directorate under the Ministry of Agriculture and Water Management of the Republic of Uzbekistan. On June 27, 2017, the President of Uzbekistan Shavkat Mirziyoyev signed a decree on the appointment of Bahrom Norqabilov as the acting chairman of the State Veterinary Committee of the Republic of Uzbekistan. Since March 2019 - Chairman of the State Veterinary Committee. On January 24, 2020, he was approved for the position of Chairman of the State Committee for Veterinary and Livestock Development of the Republic of Uzbekistan. October 22, 2020 — was elected as the chairman of the intergovernmental council for cooperation in the field of veterinary medicine of the CIS member states.
