= Bahram, Kurdistan =

Bahram بهرام
- Village
- Location within Iran
- Coordinates: 36°04′59″N 46°21′54″E
- Country: Iran
- Province: Kurdistan
- County: Saqqez
- Bakhsh: Sarshiv
- Rural District: Zu ol Faqr

Population (2006)
  - Total: 148
- Time zone: UTC+3:30 (IRST)
  - Summer (DST): UTC+4:30 (IRDT)

Bahram (Persian: بهرام, also Romanized as Bahrām) is a village in Zu ol Faqr Rural District, Sarshiv District, Saqqez County, Kurdistan Province, Iran. At the 2006 census, its population was 148, in 26 families. The village is populated by Kurds.
