= Mehram, Iran =

Mehram مهرام
- Village
- Location within Iran
- Coordinates: 38°12′58″N 47°11′00″E
- Country: Iran
- Province: East Azerbaijan
- County: Heris
- Bakhsh: Central
- Rural District: Khanamrud

Population (2006)
  - Total: 21
- Time zone: UTC+3:30 (IRST)
  - Summer (DST): UTC+4:30 (IRDT)

Mehram (Persian: مهرام, also Romanized as Mehrām; also known as Bahrām) is a village in Khanamrud Rural District, in the Central District of Heris County, East Azerbaijan Province, Iran. At the 2006 census, its population was 21, in 5 families.
