= Varanes =

Varanes is a Roman name of Persian origin, derived by the name Bahram.

- Varanes (consul 410), Roman consul in 410;
- Varanes (consul 456), Roman consul in 456.
