= Imamzadeh Hosein Reza =

Shia funerary complex in Varamin, Tehran, Iran

- امامزاده حسین رضا
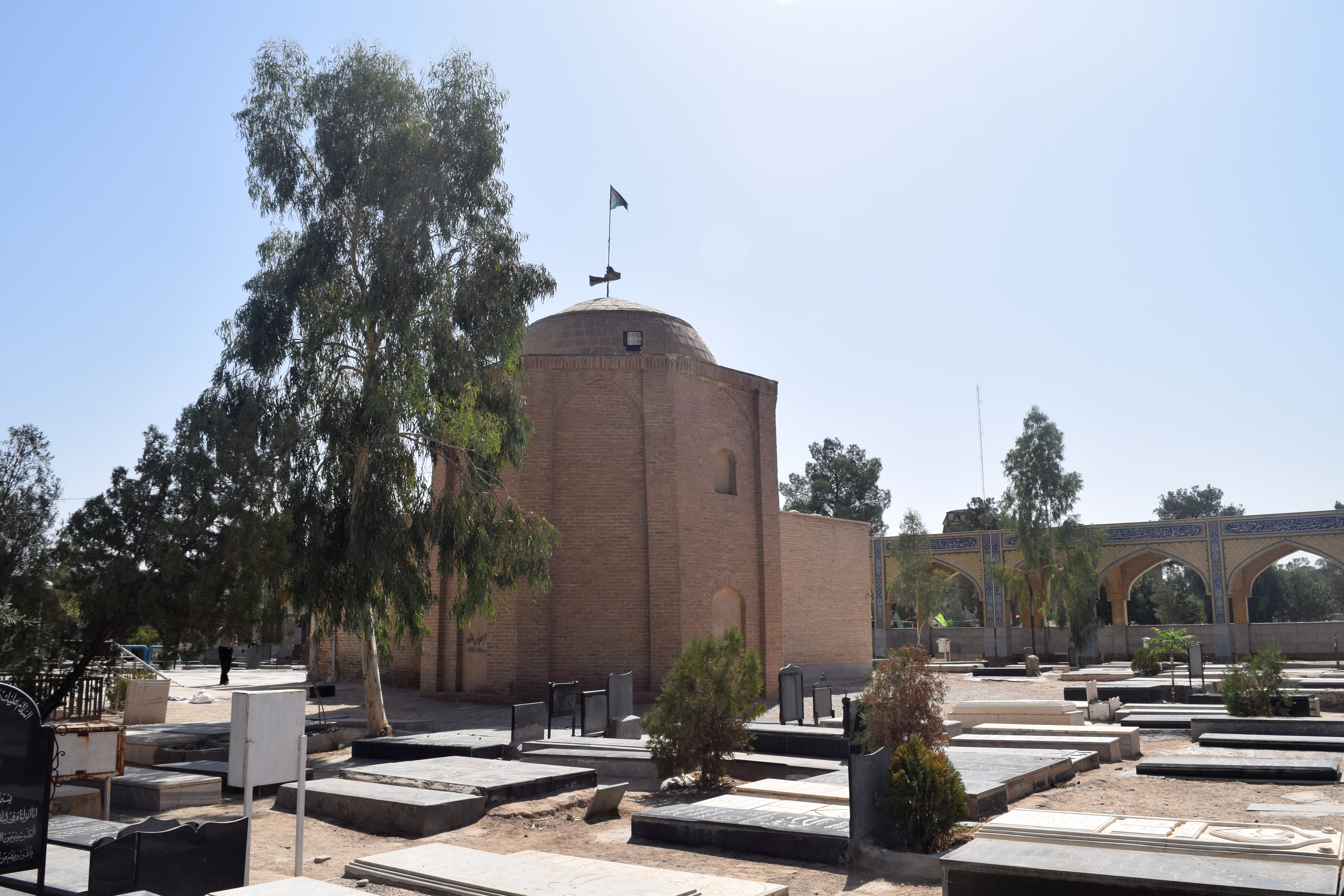
- Imamzadeh Hosein Reza in 2016

- Location of the complex in Iran

Religion
- Affiliation: Shia Islam
- Ecclesiastical or organizational status: Imamzadeh and mausoleum
- Status: Active

Location
- Location: Varamin, Tehran Province
- Country: Iran
- Interactive map of Imamzadeh Hosein Reza
- Coordinates: 35°20′18″N 51°38′38″E

Architecture
- Type: Islamic architecture
- Style: Azeri; Timurid
- Completed: 821 AH (1418/1419 CE) or 841 AH (1437/1438 CE)

Specifications
- Height (max): 9.25 m (30.3 ft)
- Dome: One (maybe more)
- Minaret: Two
- Materials: Bricks; stucco; tiles; aluminium

Iran National Heritage List
- Official name: Imamzadeh Hosein Reza
- Type: Built
- Designated: 20 December 2000
- Reference no.: 2937
- Conservation organization: Cultural Heritage, Handicrafts and Tourism Organization of Iran

The Imamzadeh Hosein Reza (Persian: امامزاده حسین رضا, romanized: Emamzadeh Hosein Reza), also known as the Imamzada Husain Rida, a Shi'ite funerary monument and religious complex, located in Varamin, in the province of Tehran, Iran. The building dates from c. 1438 CE, during the Timurid era, and is located near local railway station, in the city's main cemetery.

The building was added to the Iran National Heritage List on 20 December 2000 and is administered by the Cultural Heritage, Handicrafts and Tourism Organization of Iran.

== Architecture ==
The building is octagonal in shape, featuring a recessed blind arch on each of its eight faces. Originally free-standing, later modifications included an entrance iwan on the east side and a small domed tomb on the south side. Over time, two of the original four entrances were blocked. The exterior is adorned solely with brickwork, using bricks measuring 23 by 23 by 6 centimetres (9.1 by 9.1 by 2.4 in), including many reused ones. The brickwork shows signs of clumsiness, with thick brownish mortar filling gaps at corners where angled bricks were not used. Variations in mortar and brick color at the top of the octagon and dome suggest restoration work. Despite its modest height relative to width, the tall blind arches on each face create a sense of verticality. Notably, no scaffold holes are visible on the exterior, adding to its architectural intrigue.

The interior is square with four recesses. All surfaces are covered with plaster, which has recently been given an unhappy coating of green on the inscription, light blue below it and white above. The lower panels have modern round arches. The zone of transition is divided into eight and sixteen-sided areas. An aluminium zarih was installed inside the tomb in 1991.

The most interesting feature of the mausoleum is its stucco decoration. Two patterns are used to frame the arches of the squinch zone; one, mainly geometrical, round the squinch arches, the other mainly vegetal, round the arches in between. The elegant thulth inscription just below the squinch zone begins on the back wall of the west recess. A Quranic inscription accompanied the following phrase at the end:

"At the beginning of the month of Jumada I year 841." (November 1437).

The decade of the figure is not quite clear; a case could also be made for 821.

Structurally the monument presents no innovations. The fourteenth century tomb towers of Qom, e.g. the Imamzada Ja'far, present close parallels. Had the monument not been dated one might have been tempted to ascribe it to the fourteenth century. The remains of stucco decoration on the double minaret portal at Qum was probably one factor in its attribution to c. 1325 CE, when in fact 830 AH (1426/1427 CE) is preserved on one of the minarets. The importance of the Imamzada Husain Rida lies in the extension of the terminus ante quem for this type of stucco decoration, which had died out by the middle of the fifteenth century.

== See also ==
- List of imamzadehs in Iran
- List of mausoleums in Iran
- Shia Islam in Iran
