= Bahrami-ye Olya =

Bahrami-ye Olya بهرامي عليا
- Village
- Location within Iran
- Coordinates: 28°31′46″N 57°48′09″E
- Country: Iran
- Province: Kerman
- County: Jiroft
- Bakhsh: Central
- Rural District: Eslamabad

Population (2006)
  - Total: 254
- Time zone: UTC+3:30 (IRST)
  - Summer (DST): UTC+4:30 (IRDT)

Bahrami-ye Olya (Persian: بهرامي عليا, also Romanized as Bahrāmī-ye ‘Olyā; also known as Bahrāmī, Bahrami Sardoo’iyeh, Bahrāmī-ye Bālā, and Bahrāmī-ye Sārdū’īyeh) is a village in Eslamabad Rural District, in the Central District of Jiroft County, Kerman Province, Iran. At the 2006 census, its population was 254, in 55 families.
