= Vahramaberd =

Village in Shirak, Armenia

Vahramaberd Վահրամաբերդ
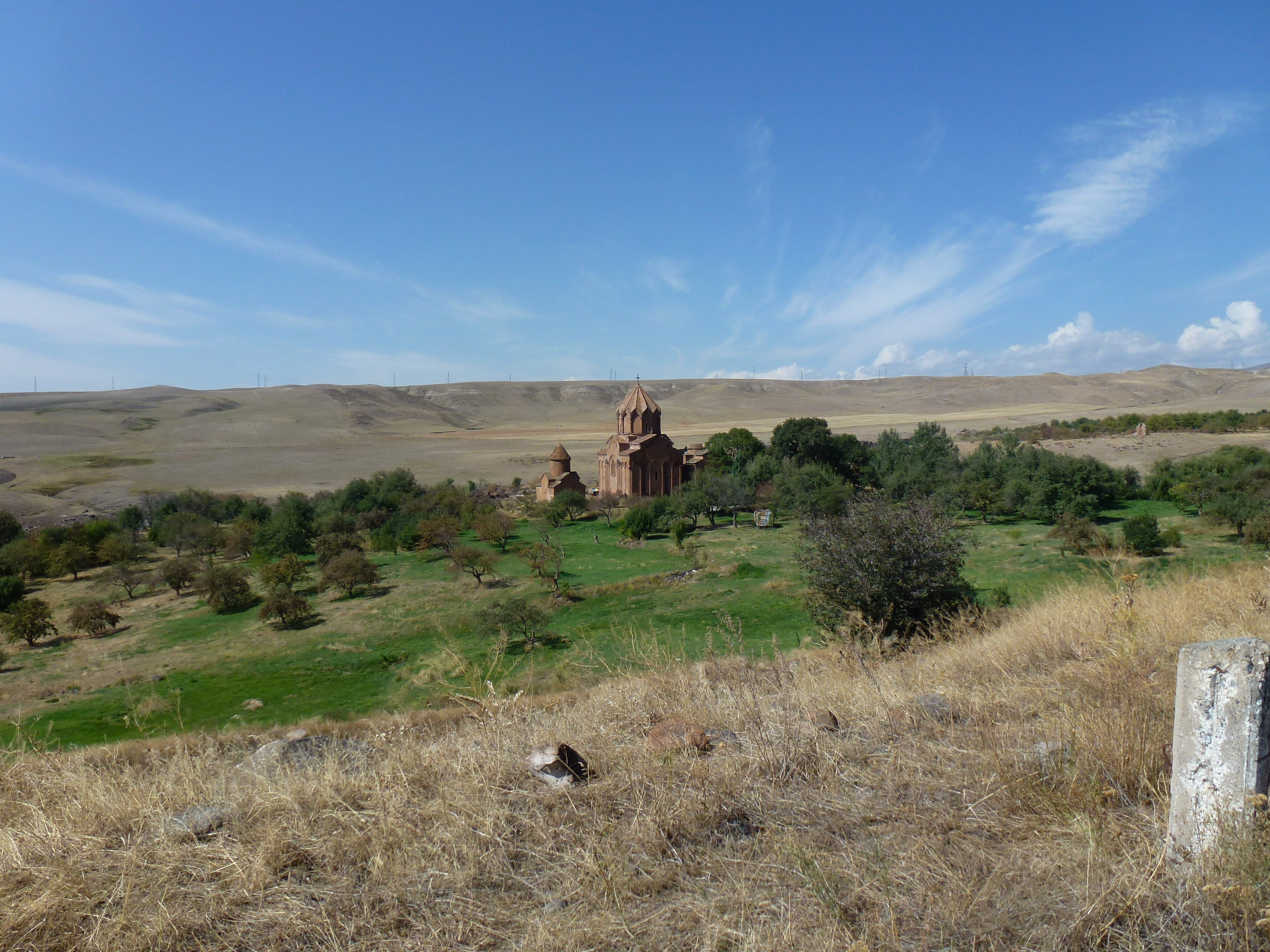
- Church Marmashen

- Location within Armenia Location within Shirak
- Coordinates: 40°51′N 43°45′E
- Country: Armenia
- Province: Shirak
- Municipality: Akhuryan

Population (2011)
  - Total: 1,455
- Time zone: UTC+4
  - Summer (DST): UTC+5

Vahramaberd (Armenian: Վահրամաբերդ) is a village in the Akhuryan Municipality of the Shirak Province of Armenia.

== Demographics ==
Historical population
Year	Pop.	±% p.a.
1831	247	—
1897	466	+0.97%
1926	272	−1.84%
1939	538	+5.39%
1959	602	+0.56%
1970	747	+1.98%
1979	752	+0.07%
1989	919	+2.03%
2001	1,155	+1.92%
2011	1,455	+2.34%
