= Kahrizeh =

Kahrizeh (Persian: كهريزه) may refer to various places in Iran:

- Kahrizeh, Divandarreh, Kurdistan Province
- Kahrizeh, Marivan, Kurdistan Province
- Kahrizeh, Saqqez, Kurdistan Province
- Kahrizeh-ye Ayyubi, Saqqez County, Kurdistan Province
- Kahrizeh-ye Ajam, West Azerbaijan Province
- Kahrizeh-ye Ali Aqa, West Azerbaijan Province
- Kahrizeh-ye Mahmud Aqa, West Azerbaijan Province
- Kahrizeh-ye Shakak, West Azerbaijan Province
