= Kani Miran =

Kani Miran (Persian: كاني ميران) may refer to:

- Kani Miran, Kurdistan
- Kani Miran, Mahabad, West Azerbaijan Province
- Kani Miran, Urmia, West Azerbaijan Province
