= Kuchek =

Kuchek (Persian: كوچك, meaning "small") may refer to:

- Kuchek, West Azerbaijan
- Kuchek-e Olya, Kurdistan Province
- Kuchek-e Sofla, Kurdistan Province
- Kuchek Olum
