= Shilanabad =

Shilanabad (Persian: شيلان اباد) may refer to:

- Shilanabad, Kurdistan
- Shilanabad, West Azerbaijan
