= Qukh =

Qukh or Qowkh (Persian: قوخ) may refer to:

- Qukh, Kermanshah
- Qukh, Saqqez, Kurdistan Province
