= Pir Safa =

Village in Kurdistan, Iran

Pir Safa پيرصفا
- Village
- Location within Iran
- Coordinates: 35°33′36″N 46°05′53″E
- Country: Iran
- Province: Kurdistan
- County: Marivan
- Bakhsh: Khav and Mirabad
- Rural District: Khav and Mirabad

Population (2006)
  - Total: 352
- Time zone: UTC+3:30 (IRST)
  - Summer (DST): UTC+4:30 (IRDT)

Pir Safa (Persian: پيرصفا, also Romanized as Pīr Şafā; also known as Pīr Moşţāfa and Pīr Mustāfa) is a village in Khav and Mirabad Rural District, Khav and Mirabad District, Marivan County, Kurdistan Province, Iran. At the 2006 census, its population was 352, in 76 families. The village is populated by Kurds.
