= Arab Ughluy =

Arab Ughluy (Persian: عرب اوغلوي), also rendered as Arab Ughlu or Arab Oghli, may refer to:

- Arab Ughluy-e Olya
- Arab Ughluy-e Sofla
