= Maraneh =

Maraneh (Persian: مرانه) may refer to:

- Maraneh, Kurdistan
- Maraneh, Mahabad, West Azerbaijan Province
- Maraneh, Sardasht, West Azerbaijan Province
