= Chakasheh =

Chakasheh چكشه
- Village
- Location within Iran
- Coordinates: 36°17′01″N 46°10′07″E
- Country: Iran
- Province: Kurdistan
- County: Saqqez
- Bakhsh: Central
- Rural District: Sara

Population (2006)
  - Total: 82
- Time zone: UTC+3:30 (IRST)
  - Summer (DST): UTC+4:30 (IRDT)

Chakasheh (Persian: چكشه) is a village in Sara Rural District, in the Central District of Saqqez County, Kurdistan Province, Iran. At the 2006 census, its population was 82, in 21 families. The village is populated by Kurds.
