= Sheykh Chupan =

Sheykh Chupan شيخ چوپان
- Village
- Location within Iran
- Coordinates: 36°13′24″N 45°55′13″E
- Country: Iran
- Province: Kurdistan
- County: Saqqez
- Bakhsh: Central
- Rural District: Tamugheh

Population (2006)
  - Total: 400
- Time zone: UTC+3:30 (IRST)
  - Summer (DST): UTC+4:30 (IRDT)

Sheykh Chupan (Persian: شيخ چوپان, also Romanized as Sheykh Chūpān; also known as Shaikh Chapān) is a village in Tamugheh Rural District, in the Central District of Saqqez County, Kurdistan Province, Iran. At the 2006 census, its population was 400, in 62 families. The village is populated by Kurds.
