= Benav Cheleh =

Benav Cheleh بناوچله
- Village
- Location within Iran
- Coordinates: 35°37′27″N 46°09′19″E
- Country: Iran
- Province: Kurdistan
- County: Marivan
- Bakhsh: Khav and Mirabad
- Rural District: Khav and Mirabad

Population (2006)
  - Total: 200
- Time zone: UTC+3:30 (IRST)
  - Summer (DST): UTC+4:30 (IRDT)

Benav Cheleh (Persian: بناوچله, also Romanized as Benāv Cheleh, Banāu Chaleh, and Benūcheleh) is a village in Khav and Mirabad Rural District, Khav and Mirabad District, Marivan County, Kurdistan Province, Iran. At the 2006 census, its population was 200, in 43 families. The village is populated by Kurds.
