= Qaqolabad =

Qaqolabad قاقل آباد
- Village
- Location within Iran
- Coordinates: 36°22′50″N 46°00′13″E
- Country: Iran
- Province: Kurdistan
- County: Saqqez
- Bakhsh: Central
- Rural District: Torjan

Population (2006)
  - Total: 99
- Time zone: UTC+3:30 (IRST)
  - Summer (DST): UTC+4:30 (IRDT)

Qaqolabad (Persian: قاقل آباد, also Romanized as Qāqolābād) is a village in Torjan Rural District, in the Central District of Saqqez County, Kurdistan Province, Iran. At the 2006 census, its population was 99, in 16 families. The village is populated by Kurds.
