= Khao =

Khao may refer to:

- Khao, Iran (Persian: خاو), a village in Kurdistan Province, Iran
- Khao (Thai: เขา, pronounced [kʰǎw]), the term for 'mountain' in Central and Southern Thailand; see List of mountains in Thailand
- Khao (Thai: ข้าว, pronounced [kʰâːw]), the term for 'rice' in the Thai and Lao languages; see Rice production in Thailand and Rice production in Laos
  - Khao soi (Thai: ข้าวซอย), Chiang Mai Curry Noodles
- Khao language, a Mon-Khmer language spoken in Vietnam
- The ICAO airport identifier for Butler County Regional Airport
