= Qabgholucheh =

Qabgholucheh قبغلوچه
- Village
- Location within Iran
- Coordinates: 36°05′35″N 46°07′01″E
- Country: Iran
- Province: Kurdistan
- County: Saqqez
- Bakhsh: Central
- Rural District: Mir Deh

Population (2006)
  - Total: 404
- Time zone: UTC+3:30 (IRST)
  - Summer (DST): UTC+4:30 (IRDT)

Qabgholucheh (Persian: قبغلوچه, also Romanized as Qabgholūcheh; also known as Qabgholūjeh) is a village in Mir Deh Rural District, in the Central District of Saqqez County, Kurdistan Province, Iran. At the 2006 census, its population was 404, in 71 families. The village is populated by Kurds.
