= Seyf =

Seyf (Persian: سيف), also rendered as Saif or Sef, may refer to:

- Deh-e Seyf, Kerman Province
- Seyf, Rafsanjan, Kerman Province
- Seyf-e Olya, Kurdistan Province
- Seyf-e Sofla, Kurdistan Province
