= Beyg Oveysi =

Bugebesê بوگەبەسێ
- Village
- Location within Iran
- Coordinates: 36°27′19″N 46°09′07″E
- Country: Iran
- Province: Kurdistan
- County: Saqqez
- Bakhsh: Central
- Rural District: Torjan

Population (2006)
  - Total: 336
- Time zone: UTC+3:30 (IRST)
  - Summer (DST): UTC+4:30 (IRDT)

Bugebesê (Persian: بوگەبەسێ, Kurdish: بوگەبەسێ also Romanized as Bugebesê is a village in Torjan Rural District, in the Central District of Saqqez County, Kurdistan Province, Iran. At the 2006 census, its population was 336, in 71 families. The village is populated by Kurds.
