= Jashniabad =

Jashniabad جشني آباد
- Village
- Location within Iran
- Coordinates: 35°39′14″N 46°01′53″E
- Country: Iran
- Province: Kurdistan
- County: Marivan
- Bakhsh: Khav and Mirabad
- Rural District: Khav and Mirabad

Population (2006)
  - Total: 388
- Time zone: UTC+3:30 (IRST)
  - Summer (DST): UTC+4:30 (IRDT)

Jashniabad (Persian: جشني آباد, also Romanized as Jashnīābād; also known as Chashnīābād) is a village in Khav and Mirabad Rural District, Khav and Mirabad District, Marivan County, Kurdistan Province, Iran. At the 2006 census, its population was 388, in 73 families. The village is populated by Kurds.
