= Qazanta =

Qazanta قازانتا
- Village
- Location within Iran
- Coordinates: 36°20′47″N 45°58′30″E
- Country: Iran
- Province: Kurdistan
- County: Saqqez
- Bakhsh: Central
- Rural District: Torjan

Population (2006)
  - Total: 72
- Time zone: UTC+3:30 (IRST)
  - Summer (DST): UTC+4:30 (IRDT)

Qazanta (Persian: قازانتا, also Romanized as Qāzāntā; also known as Qāzāntāh) is a village in Torjan Rural District, in the Central District of Saqqez County, Kurdistan Province, Iran. At the 2006 census, its population was 72, in 18 families. The village is populated by Kurds.
