= Tamuteh =

Tamuteh تموته
- Village
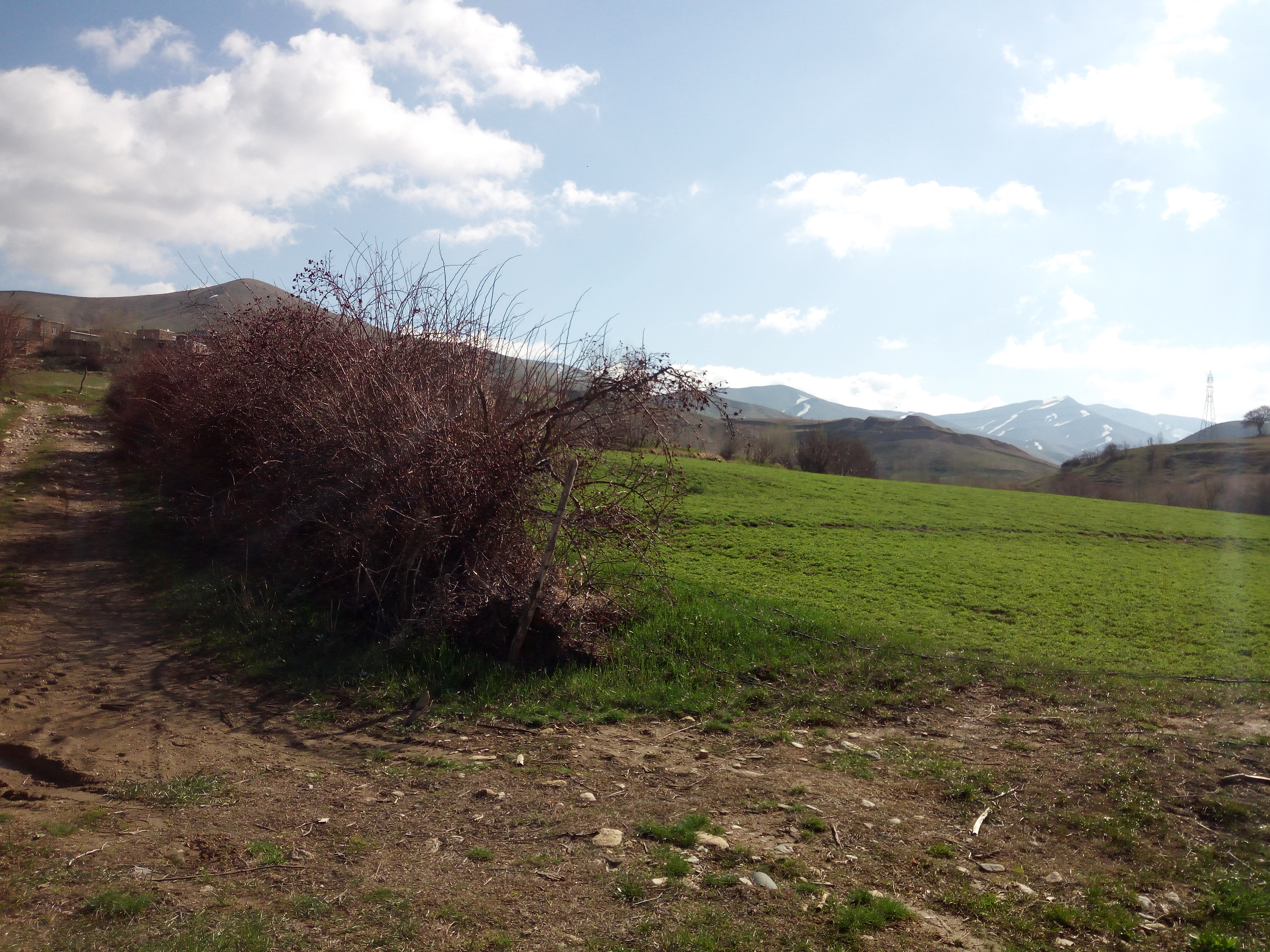
- Tamuteh

- Location within Iran
- Coordinates: 36°08′34″N 46°05′34″E
- Country: Iran
- Province: Kurdistan
- County: Saqqez
- Bakhsh: Central
- Rural District: Mir Deh

Population (2006)
  - Total: 277
- Time zone: UTC+3:30 (IRST)
  - Summer (DST): UTC+4:30 (IRDT)

Tamuteh (Persian: تموته, also Romanized as Tamūteh) is a village in Mir Deh Rural District, in the Central District of Saqqez County, Kurdistan Province, Iran. At the 2006 census, its population was 277, in 45 families. The village is populated by Kurds.
