= Hamzah Qarnian =

Hamzah Qarnian حمزه قرنيان
- Village
- Location within Iran
- Coordinates: 36°05′34″N 46°02′12″E
- Country: Iran
- Province: Kurdistan
- County: Saqqez
- Bakhsh: Central
- Rural District: Mir Deh

Population (2006)
  - Total: 88
- Time zone: UTC+3:30 (IRST)
  - Summer (DST): UTC+4:30 (IRDT)

Hamzah Qarnian (Persian: حمزه قرنيان, also Romanized as Ḩamzah Qarnīān; also known as Ḩamzah Qarah Nīn) is a village in Mir Deh Rural District, in the Central District of Saqqez County, Kurdistan Province, Iran. At the 2006 census, its population was 88, in 15 families. The village is populated by Kurds.
