= Qeshlaq-e Saleh Beyg =

Qeshlaq-e Saleh Beyg قشلاق صالح بيگ
- Village
- Location within Iran
- Coordinates: 36°11′41″N 46°10′20″E
- Country: Iran
- Province: Kurdistan
- County: Saqqez
- Bakhsh: Central
- Rural District: Tamugheh

Population (2006)
  - Total: 292
- Time zone: UTC+3:30 (IRST)
  - Summer (DST): UTC+4:30 (IRDT)

Qeshlaq-e Saleh Beyg (Persian: قشلاق صالح بيگ, also Romanized as Qeshlāq-e Şāleḩ Beyg; also known as Qeshlāq-e Şāleḩ Beyk) is a village in Tamugheh Rural District, in the Central District of Saqqez County, Kurdistan Province, Iran. At the 2006 census, its population was 292, in 59 families. The village is populated by Kurds.
