= Mukeh =

Mukeh موكه
- Village
- Location within Iran
- Coordinates: 36°22′01″N 46°19′46″E
- Country: Iran
- Province: Kurdistan
- County: Saqqez
- Bakhsh: Central
- Rural District: Sara

Population (2006)
  - Total: 71
- Time zone: UTC+3:30 (IRST)
  - Summer (DST): UTC+4:30 (IRDT)

Mukeh (Persian: موكه, also Romanized as Mūkeh) is a village in Sara Rural District, in the Central District of Saqqez County, Kurdistan Province, Iran. At the 2006 census, its population was 71, in 16 families. The village is populated by Kurds.
