= Zolfileh =

Zolfileh زلفيله
- Village
- Location within Iran
- Coordinates: 36°24′21″N 46°30′25″E
- Country: Iran
- Province: Kurdistan
- County: Saqqez
- Bakhsh: Central
- Rural District: Sara

Population (2006)
  - Total: 98
- Time zone: UTC+3:30 (IRST)
  - Summer (DST): UTC+4:30 (IRDT)

Zolfileh (Persian: زلفيله, also Romanized as Zolfīleh; also known as Zolfīneh) is a village in Sara Rural District, in the Central District of Saqqez County, Kurdistan Province, Iran. At the 2006 census, its population was 98, in 24 families. The village is populated by Kurds.
