= Bilu, Marivan =

Bilu بيلو
- Village
- Location within Iran
- Coordinates: 35°37′21″N 46°08′11″E
- Country: Iran
- Province: Kurdistan
- County: Marivan
- Bakhsh: Khav and Mirabad
- Rural District: Khav and Mirabad

Population (2006)
  - Total: 600
- Time zone: UTC+3:30 (IRST)
  - Summer (DST): UTC+4:30 (IRDT)

Bilu (Persian: بيلو, also Romanized as Bīlū; also known as Belu) is a village in Khav and Mirabad Rural District, Khav and Mirabad District, Marivan County, Kurdistan Province, Iran. At the 2006 census, its population was 600, in 120 families. The village is populated by Kurds.
