= Altun, Iran =

Altun (Persian: آلتون) may refer to:

- Altun-e Olya
- Altun-e Sofla
