= Sadabad, Marivan =

Sadabad سعد آباد
- Village
- Location within Iran
- Coordinates: 35°36′31″N 46°03′09″E
- Country: Iran
- Province: Kurdistan
- County: Marivan
- Bakhsh: Khav and Mirabad
- Rural District: Khav and Mirabad

Population (2006)
  - Total: 407
- Time zone: UTC+3:30 (IRST)
  - Summer (DST): UTC+4:30 (IRDT)

Sadabad (Persian: سعد آباد, also Romanized as Sa‘dābād) is a village in Khav and Mirabad Rural District, Khav and Mirabad District, Marivan County, Kurdistan Province, Iran. At the 2006 census, its population was 407, in 87 families. The village is populated by Kurds.
