= Shaquyaf =

Shaquyaf شقويف
- Village
- Location within Iran
- Coordinates: 36°23′10″N 46°08′14″E
- Country: Iran
- Province: Kurdistan
- County: Saqqez
- Bakhsh: Central
- Rural District: Torjan

Population (2006)
  - Total: 149
- Time zone: UTC+3:30 (IRST)
  - Summer (DST): UTC+4:30 (IRDT)

Shaquyaf (Persian: شقويف, also Romanized as Shaqūyaf) is a village in Torjan Rural District, in the Central District of Saqqez County, Kurdistan Province, Iran. At the 2006 census, its population was 149, in 26 families. The village is populated by Kurds.
