= Hijanan =

Village in Kurdistan Province, Iran

Hijanan هيجانان
- Village
- Location within Iran
- Coordinates: 36°09′49″N 46°12′24″E
- Country: Iran
- Province: Kurdistan
- County: Saqqez
- Bakhsh: Central
- Rural District: Tamugheh

Population (2006)
  - Total: 505
- Time zone: UTC+3:30 (IRST)
  - Summer (DST): UTC+4:30 (IRDT)

Hijanan (Persian: هيجانان, also Romanized as Hījānān) is a village in Tamugheh Rural District, in the Central District of Saqqez County, Kurdistan Province, Iran. At the 2006 census, its population was 505, in 101 families. The village is populated by Kurds.
