= Agriculture in Laos =

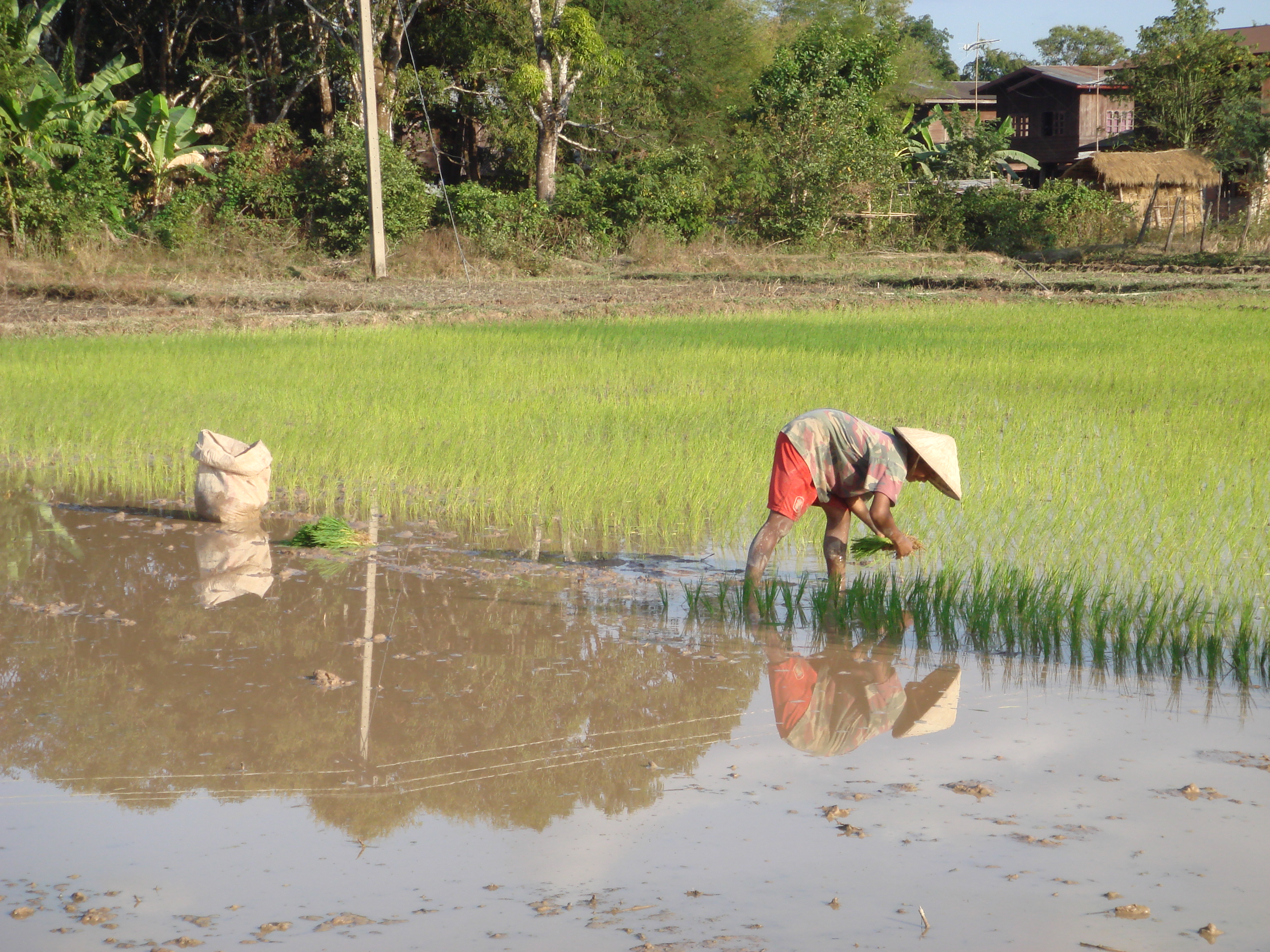
Rice planting in Champasak province. Rice accounts for over 80% of agricultural production in Laos.

The southeast Asian country of Laos, with a landmass of 23.68 million hectares, has at least 5 million hectares of land suitable for cultivation (about 21 percent). Seventeen percent of this land area (between 850,000 and 900,000 hectares) is actually cultivated, less than 4 percent of the total area.

Rice accounted for about 80 percent of cultivated land during the 1989-90 growing season, including 422,000 hectares of lowland wet rice and 223,000 hectares of upland rice. This demonstrates that although there is interplanting of upland crops and fish are found in fields, irrigated rice agriculture remains basically a monoculture system despite government efforts to encourage crop diversification.

Cultivated land area had increased by about 6 percent from 1975 to 1977 but in 1987 only provided citizens with less than one-fourth of a hectare each, given a population of approximately 3.72 million in 1986. In addition to land under cultivation, about 800,000 hectares are used for pastureland or contain ponds for raising fish. Pastureland is rotated, and its use is not fixed over a long period of time.

== Agricultural production rates ==
In the early 1990s, agriculture was the foundation of the economy. Although a slight downward trend in the sector's contribution to gross domestic product (GDP) was evident throughout the 1980s and early 1990s—from about 65 percent of GDP in 1980 to about 61 percent in 1989 and further decreasing to between 53 and 57 percent in 1991—a similar decrease in the percentage of the labor force working in that sector was not readily apparent.

Some sources identified such a downward trend—from 79 percent in 1970 to about 71 percent in 1991. Both the LPDR's State Planning Commission and the World Bank reported that 80 percent of the labor force was employed in agriculture in 1986. Available evidence thus suggests that the percentage of the labor force employed in agriculture in fact remained relatively steady at about 80 percent throughout the 1970s and 1980s.

Agricultural production grew at an average annual rate of between 3 and 4 percent between 1980 and 1989, almost double its growth rate in the preceding decade, despite two years of drought—in 1987 and 1988—when production actually declined. Paddy rice production declined again in 1991 and 1992 also because of drought. By 1990 the World Bank estimated that production was growing at an increasingly faster rate of 6.2 percent. Increased production, long one of the government's goals, is a result in part of greater use of improved agricultural inputs during the 1970s and 1980s.

The area of land under irrigation had been expanding at a rate of 12 percent per annum since 1965, so that by the late 1980s, irrigated land constituted between 7 and 13 percent of total agricultural land. Although still a small percentage, any increase helps to facilitate a continued rise in agricultural productivity. Smallscale village irrigation projects rather than large-scale systems predominate. Use of fertilizers increased as well, at an average annual rate of 7.2 percent; given that commercial fertilizer use had been virtually nonexistent in the late 1970s, this, too, is an important, if small, achievement in the government's pursuit of increased productivity. In addition, the number of tractors in use nearly doubled during the decade, from 460 tractors in 1980 to 860 in 1989.

== Cropping and farming systems ==
Most farmers employ one of two cultivation systems: either the wet-field paddy system, practiced primarily in the plains and valleys, or the slash-and-burn cultivation system, practiced primarily in the hills. These systems are not mutually exclusive, especially among the Lao Loum or lowland Lao in areas remote from major river valleys. Slash-and-burn cultivation was practiced by approximately 1 million farmers in 1990, who grew mostly rice on about 40 percent of the total land area planted to rice.

=== Slash-and-burn ===
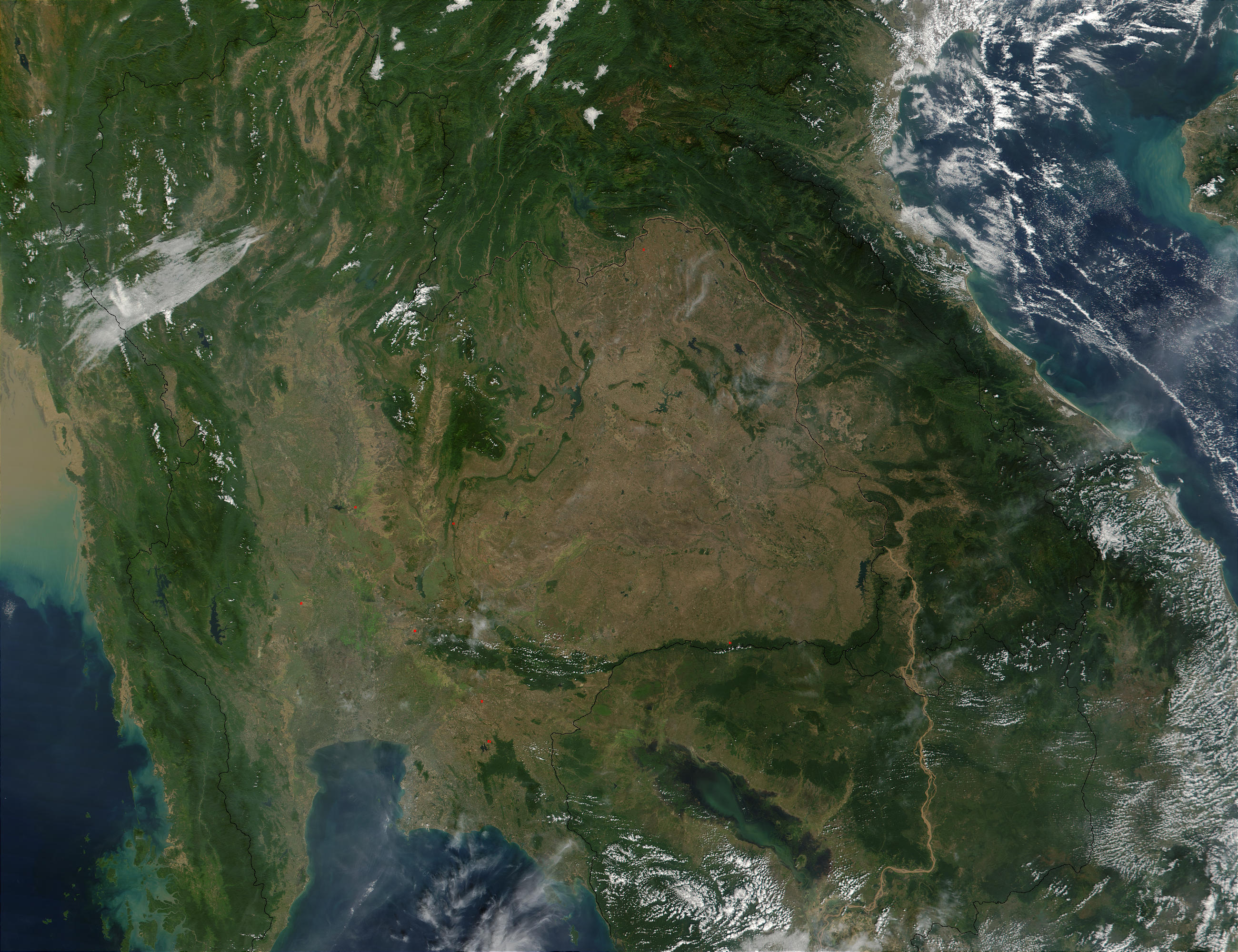
This is a 2001 MODIS image of southeastern Asia. In eastern Thailand, the brown coloring that dominates the center of the image and mimics the country's border with Laos and Cambodia, speaks of the massive deforestation that occurs in this region. Deforestation has played a major role in flooding in the region.

Slash-and-burn agriculture is highly destructive to the forest environment, because it entails shifting from old to new plots of land to allow exhausted soil to rejuvenate, a process that is estimated to require at least four to six years. The extent of destruction, however, depends on the techniques used by the farmers and the overall demographic and environmental circumstances that relate to the length of the fallow period between farming cycles. Further, traditional agricultural practices allowed for forest regeneration and not the stripping of forest cover, which is a current commercial logging practice.

Slash-and-burn fields are typically cultivated only for a year, and then allowed to lie fallow, although Kammu (alternate spellings include Khamu and Khmu) anthropologist Tayanin Damrong reports that at least through the 1970s some fields were planted two years in a row. An increasing population, encroachment on traditional slash-and-burn farming areas by other villages or ethnic groups, and gradual deterioration of the soil as a result of these pressures have led to increasingly frequent shortfalls in the harvests of midland slash-and-burn farmers.

The slash-and-burn farming process begins with clearing the selected fields in January or February, allowing the cut brush and trees to dry for a month, and then burning them. Rice or other crops are seeded by dibble shortly before the rains begin in June, and the growing crops must be weeded two or three times before the harvest in October. Slash-and-burn farming households are seldom able to harvest a rice surplus - the harvest usually falls one to six months short of families' annual rice requirements.

=== Deforestation and erosion ===
Erosion from deforestation is a direct and serious result of slash-and-burn agriculture. Moreover, slash-and-burn cultivation is less productive than wet-field cultivation because it requires between ten and fifty times as much land per capita—if one includes the fallow fields in the calculation—yet produces just 20 percent of the national rice harvest. Mature fallows or young forests have other benefits such as wild food gathering, animal habitat, and watershed protection.

Government policy following the introduction of the New Economic Mechanism discourages the practice of slash-and-burn cultivation because it works against the goals of increased agricultural productivity and an improved forest environment. Also, the government wishes to control the population in close clusters. Farmers have resisted the change, largely because wet-field cultivation often is not feasible in their areas and because no alternative method of subsistence has presented itself, especially given the lack of markets and infrastructure necessary for cash-cropping to be an attractive, or even a possible, venture.

Further, government traders' defaults on purchase contracts with farmers in the late 1980s made farmers with better physical access to markets skeptical about cash-crop production. In general, despite government efforts to increase export-oriented agricultural production, the "rice monoculture" persisted in Laos through the early 1990s.

== Livestock ==
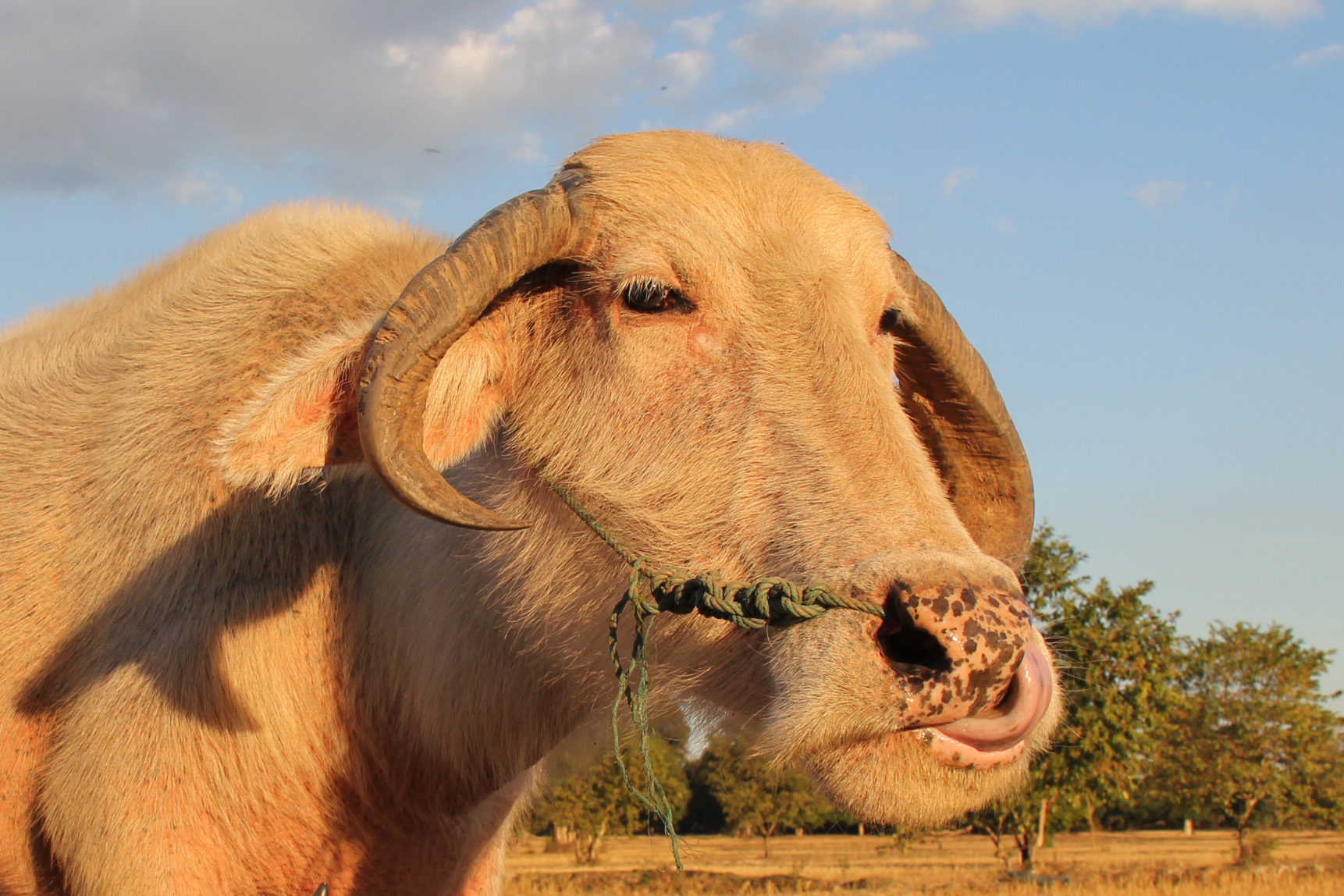
Cattle in Si Phan Don

The government encourages animal husbandry through programs for cattle breeding, veterinary services, cultivation of pasture crops, and improvement of fish, poultry, and pig stocks. Between 1976-78 and 1986–88, the stock of all farm animals increased greatly: cattle by 69 percent to 588,000 head; goats by 128 percent to 73,000; pigs by 103 percent to 1.5 million; horses by 59 percent to 42,000; buffaloes by 55 percent to 1 million; and chickens by 101 percent to 8 million.

Increases would have been significantly greater without diseases and a persistent shortage of animal feed. Disease is a serious problem: there is a significant annual mortality of chickens and pigs in most villages, and buffaloes are also frequently subject to epidemics.

== Agricultural products ==
=== Rice farming ===
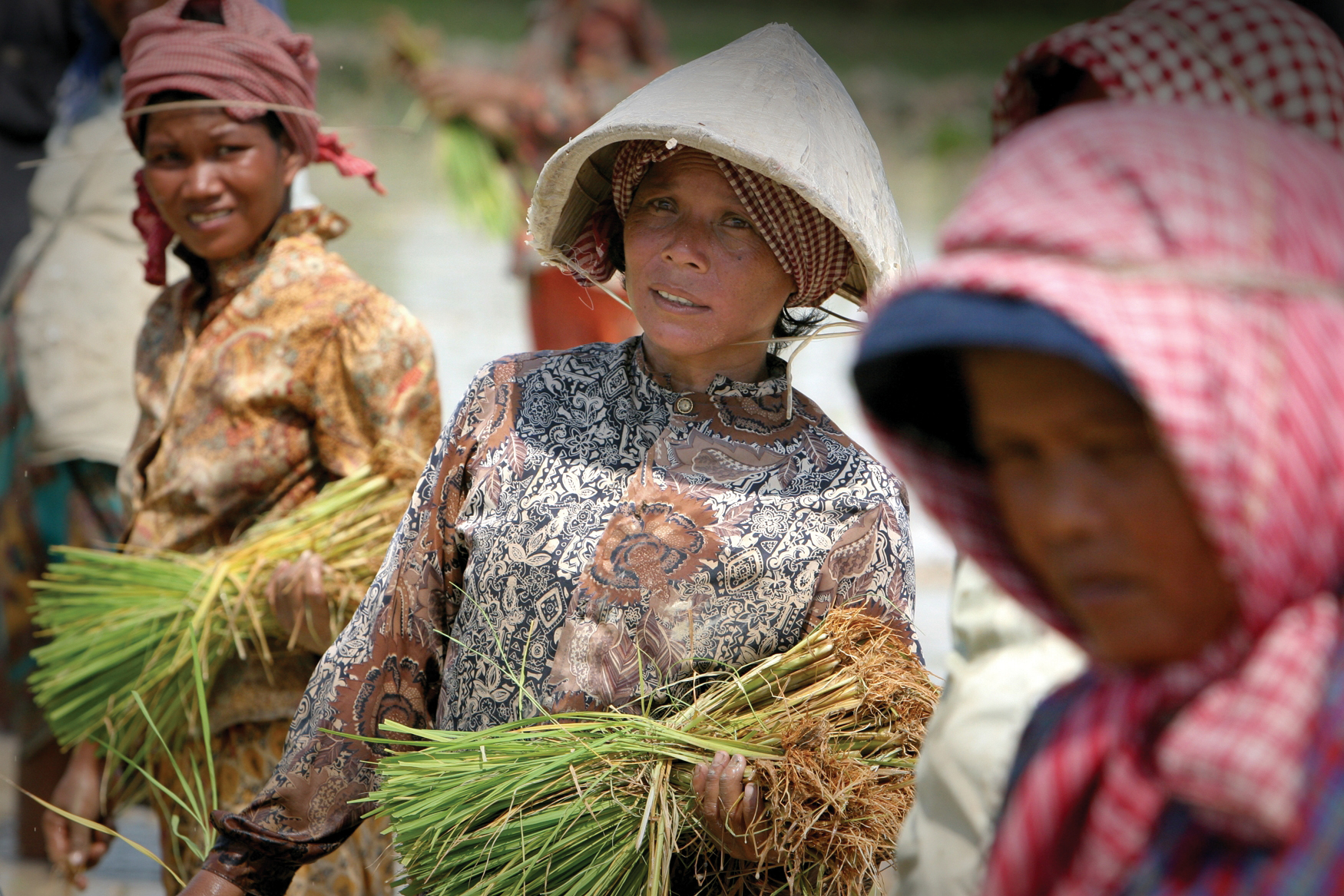
Laotian women planting rice seedlings near Sekong.

Rice is a key staple for Laos, and over 60% of arable land is used for its cultivation. Rice is primarily produced in the country's lowland areas, with only approximately 11% of production taking place in highland areas. Many of the leading rice-producing provinces are located along the Mekong River (e.g., Vientiane, Khammouan, Bolikhamxai, Savannakhet, Salavan, and Champasak). Average rice farms are small, averaging only around 1–2 hectares (2.5–4.9 acres).

=== Coffee ===
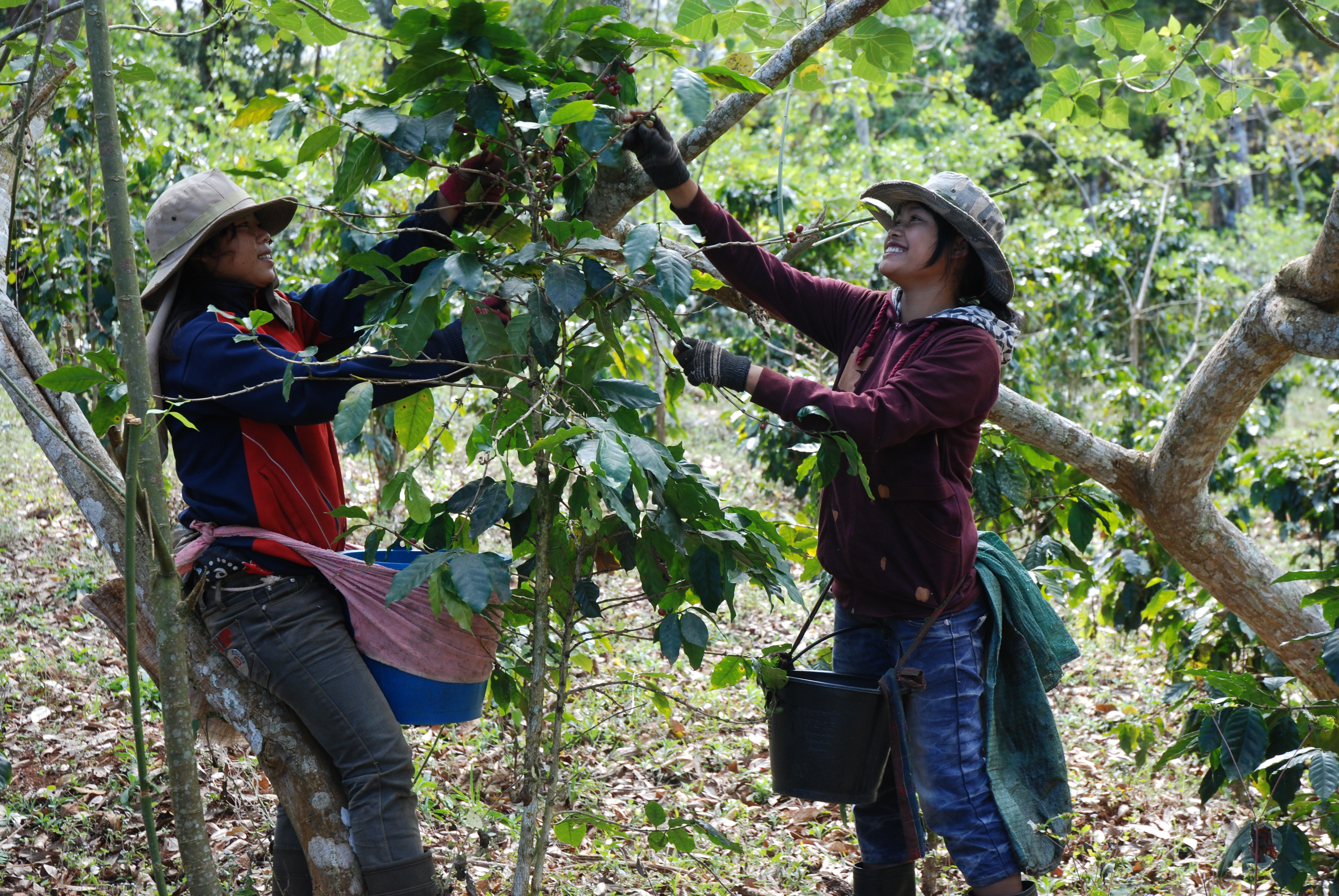
Coffee harvest in Laos

Laos produces two main types of coffee: Robusta and Arabica. Robusta is mainly used for regular coffee as well as a typical coffee drink in Laos where they sweeten it with condensed milk. The latter, Arabica, is of a higher quality due to its mild taste, and it is used for espresso. For the 20,000 tons of coffee that Laos produces a year, 5,000 tons are Arabica beans and 15,000 tons are Robusta.

=== Opium ===
Statistics for agricultural production do not reflect either the nature of the subsistence agricultural economy or the importance of opium to the hill economy. Opium, legal until 2006 in Laos and once even accepted as a tax payment, is a lucrative cash crop for the Lao Sung including the Hmong who have resisted government efforts to replace opium production with the production of other goods, for which the market is much less profitable.

Crop substitution programs have had some effect, and to some extent tougher laws against drug trafficking and government cooperation on training programs have also contributed to reduced output. In 1994 Laos remained the third largest producer of illicit opium for the world market, according to United States drug enforcement officials.

Officials estimate the potential yield of opium declined 47 percent—from 380 tons in 1989 when a memorandum of understanding on narcotics cooperation between the United States and Laos was signed—to an estimated 180 tons in 1993. The 22 percent decline in opium production in 1993 from 1992 was largely attributed to adverse weather conditions.

=== Other crops ===
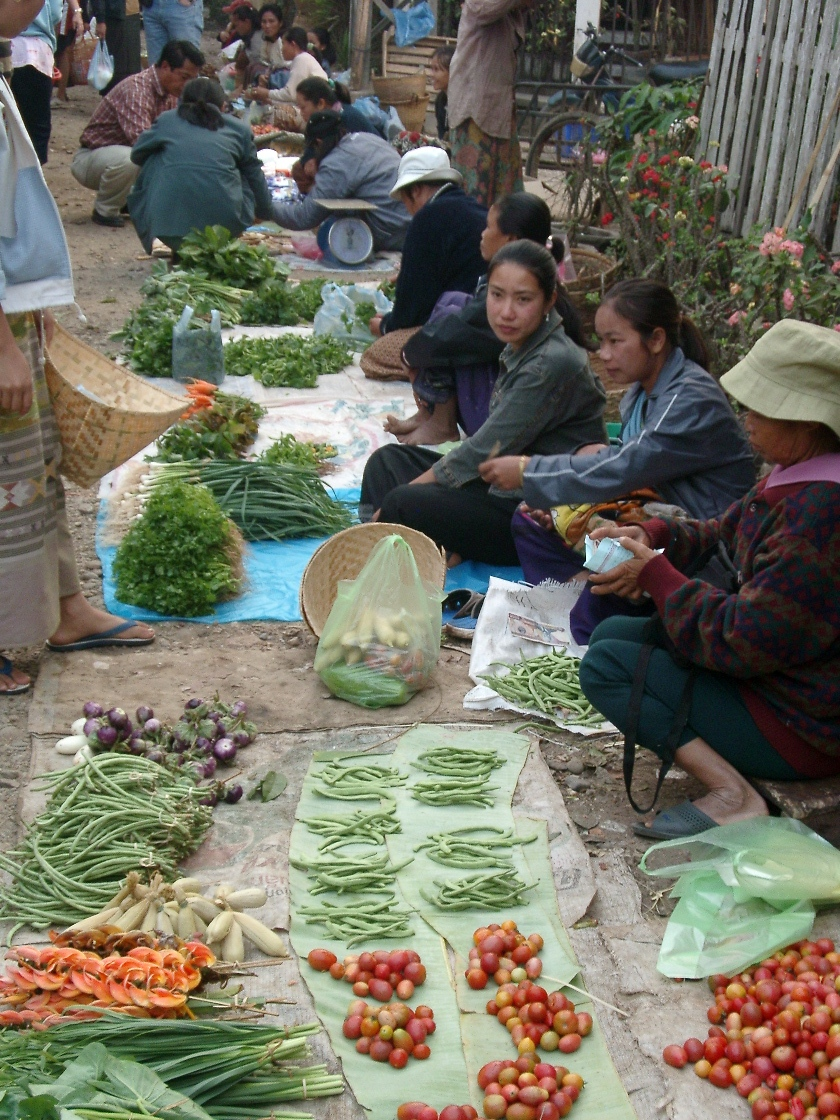
A market in Luang Prabang.

About 150,000 hectares were planted with major crops other than rice in 1990, an increase from approximately 80,000 hectares in 1980. Principal nonrice crops include cardamom, sometimes considered a forestry product, coffee, corn, cotton, fruit, mung beans, peanuts, soybeans, sugarcane, sweet potatoes, tobacco, and vegetables.

The only crop produced for export in substantial quantities is coffee. Although the total area planted to these crops is small relative to the area planted to rice, it increased from 10 percent of total cropped area in 1980 to about 18 percent in 1990. Although the increase in part reflects the drop in rice production during the drought years, it also demonstrates some success in the government's push to diversify crops.

Yields for all the major crops except coffee, vegetables, and cardamom; for which some figures are only available from 1986, increased gradually between 1980 and 1990, most notably corn (by 70 percent), fruit (by 65 percent), peanuts (by 28 percent), and mung beans (by 25 percent). Despite increasing agricultural output, Laos an importer of food, is still heavily dependent on food aid.

== See also ==
- Deforestation in Laos
