= Qureh Darreh =

Qureh Darreh قوره دره
- Village
- Location within Iran
- Coordinates: 36°07′18″N 46°02′32″E
- Country: Iran
- Province: Kurdistan
- County: Saqqez
- Bakhsh: Central
- Rural District: Mir Deh

Population (2006)
  - Total: 198
- Time zone: UTC+3:30 (IRST)
  - Summer (DST): UTC+4:30 (IRDT)

Qureh Darreh (Persian: قوره دره, also Romanized as Qūreh Darreh) is a village in Mir Deh Rural District, in the Central District of Saqqez County, Kurdistan Province, Iran. At the 2006 census, its population was 198, in 39 families. The village is populated by Kurds.
