= Malqarani =

Malqarani ملقرني
- Village
- Location within Iran
- Coordinates: 36°16′00″N 46°12′54″E
- Country: Iran
- Province: Kurdistan
- County: Saqqez
- Bakhsh: Central
- Rural District: Tamugheh

Population (2006)
  - Total: 456
- Time zone: UTC+3:30 (IRST)
  - Summer (DST): UTC+4:30 (IRDT)

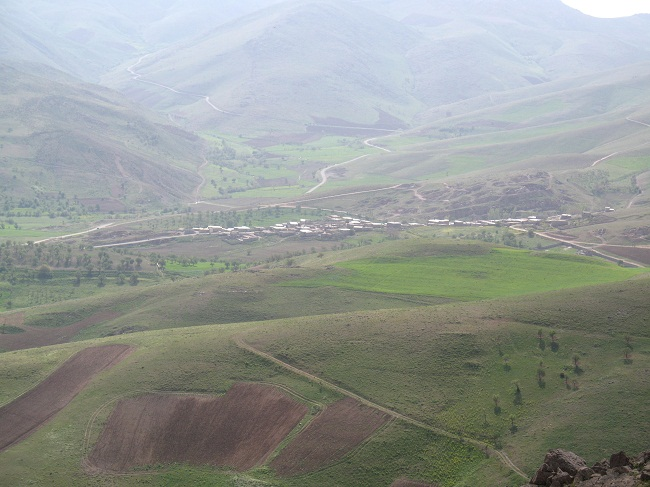
Malqarani

Malqarani (Persian: ملقرني, also Romanized as Malqaranī and Malqarānī) is a village in Tamugheh Rural District, in the Central District of Saqqez County, Kurdistan Province, Iran. At the 2006 census, its population was 456, in 96 families. The village is populated by Kurds.
