= Khapureh Deh =

Khapureh Deh خاپوره ده
- Village
- Location within Iran
- Coordinates: 36°06′21″N 45°59′10″E
- Country: Iran
- Province: Kurdistan
- County: Saqqez
- Bakhsh: Central
- Rural District: Mir Deh

Population (2006)
  - Total: 239
- Time zone: UTC+3:30 (IRST)
  - Summer (DST): UTC+4:30 (IRDT)

Khapureh Deh (Persian: خاپوره ده, also Romanized as Khāpūreh Deh) is a village in Mir Deh Rural District, in the Central District of Saqqez County, Kurdistan Province, Iran. At the 2006 census, its population was 239, in 47 families. The village is populated by Kurds.
