= Karvian =

Karvian كرويان
- Village
- Country: Iran
- Province: Kurdistan
- County: Saqqez
- Bakhsh: Central
- Rural District: Mir Deh

Population (2006)
  - Total: 205
- Time zone: UTC+3:30 (IRST)
  - Summer (DST): UTC+4:30 (IRDT)

Karvian (Persian: كرويان, also Romanized as Karvīān) is a village in Mir Deh Rural District, in the Central District of Saqqez County, Kurdistan Province, Iran. At the 2006 census, its population was 205, in 35 families. The village is populated by Kurds.
