= Darreh Varan =

Darreh Varan دره وران
- Village
- Location within Iran
- Coordinates: 35°39′40″N 46°08′25″E
- Country: Iran
- Province: Kurdistan
- County: Marivan
- Bakhsh: Khav and Mirabad
- Rural District: Khav and Mirabad

Population (2006)
  - Total: 337
- Time zone: UTC+3:30 (IRST)
  - Summer (DST): UTC+4:30 (IRDT)

Darreh Varan (Persian: دره وران, also Romanized as Darreh Varān and Darreh Wārān) is a village in Khav and Mirabad Rural District, Khav and Mirabad District, Marivan County, Kurdistan Province, Iran. At the 2006 census, its population was 337, in 70 families. The village is populated by Kurds.
