= Pir Amran =

Pir Amran پيرعمران
- Village
- Location within Iran
- Coordinates: 36°03′07″N 46°05′43″E
- Country: Iran
- Province: Kurdistan
- County: Saqqez
- Bakhsh: Central
- Rural District: Mir Deh

Population (2006)
  - Total: 562
- Time zone: UTC+3:30 (IRST)
  - Summer (DST): UTC+4:30 (IRDT)

Pir Amran (Persian: پيرعمران, also Romanized as Pīr ‘Amrān) is a village in Mir Deh Rural District, in the Central District of Saqqez County, Kurdistan Province, Iran. At the 2006 census, its population was 562, in 84 families. The village is populated by Kurds.
