= Siah Dar =

Siah Dar (Persian: سياهدر) may refer to:

- Siah Dar-e Kohneh
- Siah Dar-e Olya
