= Mirgah =

Mirgah (Persian: ميرگه) may refer to:

- Mirgah-e Derizh
- Mirgah Naqshineh
