= Shivah Tu =

Shivah Tu شيوه تو
- Village
- Location within Iran
- Coordinates: 36°11′44″N 46°02′10″E
- Country: Iran
- Province: Kurdistan
- County: Saqqez
- Bakhsh: Central
- Rural District: Mir Deh

Population (2006)
  - Total: 178
- Time zone: UTC+3:30 (IRST)
  - Summer (DST): UTC+4:30 (IRDT)

Shivah Tu (Persian: شيوه تو, also Romanized as Shīvah Tū) is a village in Mir Deh Rural District, in the Central District of Saqqez County, Kurdistan Province, Iran. At the 2006 census, its population was 178, in 30 families. The village is populated by Kurds.
