= Qeshlaq-e Afghanan =

Qeshlaq-e Afghanan قشلاق افغانان
- Village
- Location within Iran
- Coordinates: 36°14′15″N 46°06′40″E
- Country: Iran
- Province: Kurdistan
- County: Saqqez
- Bakhsh: Central
- Rural District: Tamugheh

Population (2006)
  - Total: 294
- Time zone: UTC+3:30 (IRST)
  - Summer (DST): UTC+4:30 (IRDT)

Qeshlaq-e Afghanan (Persian: قشلاق افغانان, also Romanized as Qeshlāq-e Afghānān; also known as Qeshlāq-e Afghāzān) is a village in Tamugheh Rural District, in the Central District of Saqqez County, Kurdistan Province, Iran. At the 2006 census, its population was 294, in 49 families. The village is populated by Kurds.
