= Qahraman =

Qahraman or Qahreman (Persian: قهرمان) may refer to:

- Qahreman, Kurdistan
- Qahraman, West Azerbaijan
