= Kavireh Guyez =

Kvireh Guyez کویره گویز
- Village
- Location within Iran
- Coordinates: 36°13′54″N 46°03′16″E
- Country: Iran
- Province: Kurdistan
- County: Saqqez
- Bakhsh: Central
- Rural District: Tamugheh

Population (2006)
  - Total: 202
- Time zone: UTC+3:30 (IRST)
  - Summer (DST): UTC+4:30 (IRDT)

Kavireh Guyez (Persian: کویره گویز, also Romanized as Kavīreh Gūyez; also known as Kavereh Gowz; original Kurdish spelling: Kwêre Gwêz) is a village in Tamugheh Rural District, in the Central District of Saqqez County, Kurdistan Province, Iran. At the 2006 census, its population was 202, in 33 families. The village is populated by Kurds.
