= Bubaktan =

Bubaktan بوبكتان
- Village
- Location within Iran
- Coordinates: 36°15′04″N 45°59′44″E
- Country: Iran
- Province: Kurdistan
- County: Saqqez
- Bakhsh: Central
- Rural District: Tamugheh

Population (2006)
  - Total: 465
- Time zone: UTC+3:30 (IRST)
  - Summer (DST): UTC+4:30 (IRDT)

Bubaktan (Persian: بوبكتان, also Romanized as Būbaktān) is a village in Tamugheh Rural District, in the Central District of Saqqez County, Kurdistan Province, Iran. At the 2006 census, its population was 465, in 71 families. The village is populated by Kurds.
