= Belehjar =

Belehjar بله‌جر
- Village
- Location within Iran
- Coordinates: 36°10′39″N 46°03′45″E
- Country: Iran
- Province: Kurdistan
- County: Saqqez
- Bakhsh: Central
- Rural District: Mir Deh

Population (2006)
  - Total: 492
- Time zone: UTC+3:30 (IRST)
  - Summer (DST): UTC+4:30 (IRDT)

Belehjar (Persian: بله‌جر) is a village in Mir Deh Rural District, in the Central District of Saqqez County, Kurdistan Province, Iran. At the 2006 census, its population was 492, in 86 families. The village is populated by Kurds.
