= Bashmaq, Marivan =

Bashmaq باشماخ
- Village
- Location within Iran
- Coordinates: 35°36′25″N 46°02′10″E
- Country: Iran
- Province: Kurdistan
- County: Marivan
- Bakhsh: Khav and Mirabad
- Rural District: Khav and Mirabad

Population (2006)
  - Total: 59
- Time zone: UTC+3:30 (IRST)
  - Summer (DST): UTC+4:30 (IRDT)

Bashmaq (Persian: باشماق, also Romanized as Bāshmāq) is a village in Khav and Mirabad Rural District, Khav and Mirabad District, Marivan County, Kurdistan Province, Iran. During the 2006 census, its population was 59, in 17 families. The village is populated by Kurds.
