= Gavizeh =

Gavizeh گويزه
- Village
- Location within Iran
- Coordinates: 36°12′25″N 45°57′06″E
- Country: Iran
- Province: Kurdistan
- County: Saqqez
- Bakhsh: Central
- Rural District: Mir Deh

Population (2006)
  - Total: 269
- Time zone: UTC+3:30 (IRST)
  - Summer (DST): UTC+4:30 (IRDT)

Gavizeh (Persian: گويزه, also Romanized as Gavīzeh; also known as Gavīzī) is a village in Mir Deh Rural District, in the Central District of Saqqez County, Kurdistan Province, Iran. At the 2006 census, its population was 269, in 47 families. The village is populated by Kurds.
