= Qarah Guyoz =

Qarah Guyoz قره گويز
- Village
- Location within Iran
- Coordinates: 36°25′26″N 46°01′09″E
- Country: Iran
- Province: Kurdistan
- County: Saqqez
- Bakhsh: Central
- Rural District: Torjan

Population (2006)
  - Total: 582
- Time zone: UTC+3:30 (IRST)
  - Summer (DST): UTC+4:30 (IRDT)

Qarah Guyoz (Persian: قره گويز, also Romanized as Qarah Gūyoz and Qareh Gūyoz) is a village in Torjan Rural District, in the Central District of Saqqez County, Kurdistan Province, Iran. At the 2006 census, its population was 582, in 105 families. The village is populated by Kurds.
