= Bayveh =

Bayveh بايوه
- Village
- Location within Iran
- Coordinates: 35°35′35″N 46°01′52″E
- Country: Iran
- Province: Kurdistan
- County: Marivan
- Bakhsh: Khav and Mirabad
- Rural District: Khav and Mirabad

Population (2006)
  - Total: 121
- Time zone: UTC+3:30 (IRST)
  - Summer (DST): UTC+4:30 (IRDT)

Bayveh (Persian: بايوه, also Romanized as Bāyveh, Bāīveh, Bāyavah, and Bāyoveh) is a village in Khav and Mirabad Rural District, Khav and Mirabad District, Marivan County, Kurdistan Province, Iran. At the 2006 census, its population was 121, in 37 families. The village is populated by Kurds.
