= Mandil Besar =

Mandil Besar منديل بسر
- Village
- Location within Iran
- Coordinates: 36°23′40″N 46°14′48″E
- Country: Iran
- Province: Kurdistan
- County: Saqqez
- Bakhsh: Central
- Rural District: Sara

Population (2006)
  - Total: 23
- Time zone: UTC+3:30 (IRST)
  - Summer (DST): UTC+4:30 (IRDT)

Mandil Besar (Persian: منديل بسر, also Romanized as Mandīl Besar) is a village in Sara Rural District, in the Central District of Saqqez County, Kurdistan Province, Iran. As at the 2006 census, its population was 23, in 5 families. The village is populated by Kurds.
