= Qahrabad-e Olya =

(Qarawa)Qahrabad-e Olya- قهرآباد علیا English name karawa
- village
- Karawa
- Location within Iran
- Coordinates: 36°27′04″N 46°07′32″E
- Country: Iran
- Province: Kurdistan
- County: Saqqez
- Bakhsh: Central
- Rural District: Torjan

Population (2006)
  - Total: 95
- Time zone: UTC+3:30 (IRST)
  - Summer (DST): UTC+4:30 (IRDT)

(Qarawa)Qahrabad-e Olya (Persian: قهرآباد علیا, also Romanized as Qahrābād-e Olyā; also known as Qahrābād) is a village in Torjan Rural District, in the Central District of Saqqez County, Kurdistan Province, Iran. At the 2006 census, its population was 95, in 17 families. The village is populated by Kurds.
