= Pir Yunes =

Pir Yunes پيريونس
- Village
- Location within Iran
- Coordinates: 36°19′03″N 46°26′10″E
- Country: Iran
- Province: Kurdistan
- County: Saqqez
- Bakhsh: Central
- Rural District: Sara

Population (2006)
  - Total: 95
- Time zone: UTC+3:30 (IRST)
  - Summer (DST): UTC+4:30 (IRDT)

Pir Yunes (Persian: پيريونس, also Romanized as Pīr Yūnes) is a village in Sara Rural District, in the Central District of Saqqez County, Kurdistan Province, Iran. At the 2006 census, its population was 95, in 19 families. The village is populated by Kurds.
