= Siah Dar-e Olya =

Siah Dar-e Olya سياهدرعليا
- Village
- Location within Iran
- Coordinates: 36°08′24″N 45°58′44″E
- Country: Iran
- Province: Kurdistan
- County: Saqqez
- Bakhsh: Central
- Rural District: Mir Deh

Population (2006)
  - Total: 348
- Time zone: UTC+3:30 (IRST)
  - Summer (DST): UTC+4:30 (IRDT)

Siah Dar-e Olya (Persian: سياهدرعليا, also Romanized as Sīāh Dar-e ‘Olyā) is a village in Mir Deh Rural District, in the Central District of Saqqez County, Kurdistan Province, Iran. At the 2006 census, its population was 348, in 68 families. The village is populated by Kurds.
