= Arab Ughluy-e Sofla =

Arab Ughluy-e Sofla عرب‌اوغلوی سفلی
- Village
- Location within Iran
- Coordinates: 36°19′48″N 46°23′16″E
- Country: Iran
- Province: Kurdistan
- County: Saqqez
- Bakhsh: Central
- Rural District: Sara

Population (2006)
  - Total: 262
- Time zone: UTC+3:30 (IRST)
  - Summer (DST): UTC+4:30 (IRDT)

Arab Ughluy-e Sofla (Persian: عرب‌اوغلوی سفلی, also Romanized as ‘Arab Ūghlūy-e Soflá; also known as ‘Arab Oghlī-ye Soflá and ‘Arab Ūghlū-ye Pā'īn) is a village in Sara Rural District, in the Central District of Saqqez County, Kurdistan Province, Iran. At the 2006 census, its population was 262, in 56 families. The village is populated by Kurds.
