= Sardush =

Village in Kurdistan province, Iran

Sardush Persian: سردوش
- Village
- Location within Iran Location within Iran Kurdistan
- Coordinates: 35°31′17″N 46°04′19″E
- Country: Iran
- Province: Kurdistan
- County: Marivan
- District: Khav and Mirabad
- Rural District: Khav and Mirabad

Population (2016)
  - Total: 1,439
- Time zone: UTC+3:30 (IRST)

Sardush (Persian: سردوش) (Note: Also romanized as Sardūsh) is a village in Khav and Mirabad Rural District of Khav and Mirabad District, Marivan County, Kurdistan province, Iran.

== Demographics ==
=== Ethnicity ===
The village is populated by Kurds.

=== Population ===
At the time of the 2006 National Census, the village's population was 1,387 in 300 households. The following census in 2011 counted 1,502 people in 380 households. The 2016 census measured the population of the village as 1,439 people in 423 households. It was the most populous village in its rural district.
