= Mirgah-e Derizh =

Mirgah-e Derizh ميرگه دريژ
- Village
- Location within Iran
- Coordinates: 35°40′24″N 46°06′19″E
- Country: Iran
- Province: Kurdistan
- County: Marivan
- Bakhsh: Khav and Mirabad
- Rural District: Khav and Mirabad

Population (2006)
  - Total: 232
- Time zone: UTC+3:30 (IRST)
  - Summer (DST): UTC+4:30 (IRDT)

Mirgah-e Derizh (Persian: ميرگه دريژ, also Romanized as Mīrgah-e Derīzh; also known as Mergeh Darshīr, Mergeh Derīzh, Mergeh Dorīzh, Merkeh Derīzh, Mīrgedrezh, Mīrgeh Derīzh, Mirgehdrij, Mirg-i-Dariz, and Mirkeh Darizheh) is a village in Khav and Mirabad Rural District, Khav and Mirabad District, Marivan County, Kurdistan Province, Iran. At the 2006 census, its population was 232, in 49 families. The village is populated by Kurds.
