= Torjan =

Village in Kurdistan province, Iran

Torjan Persian: ترجان
- Village
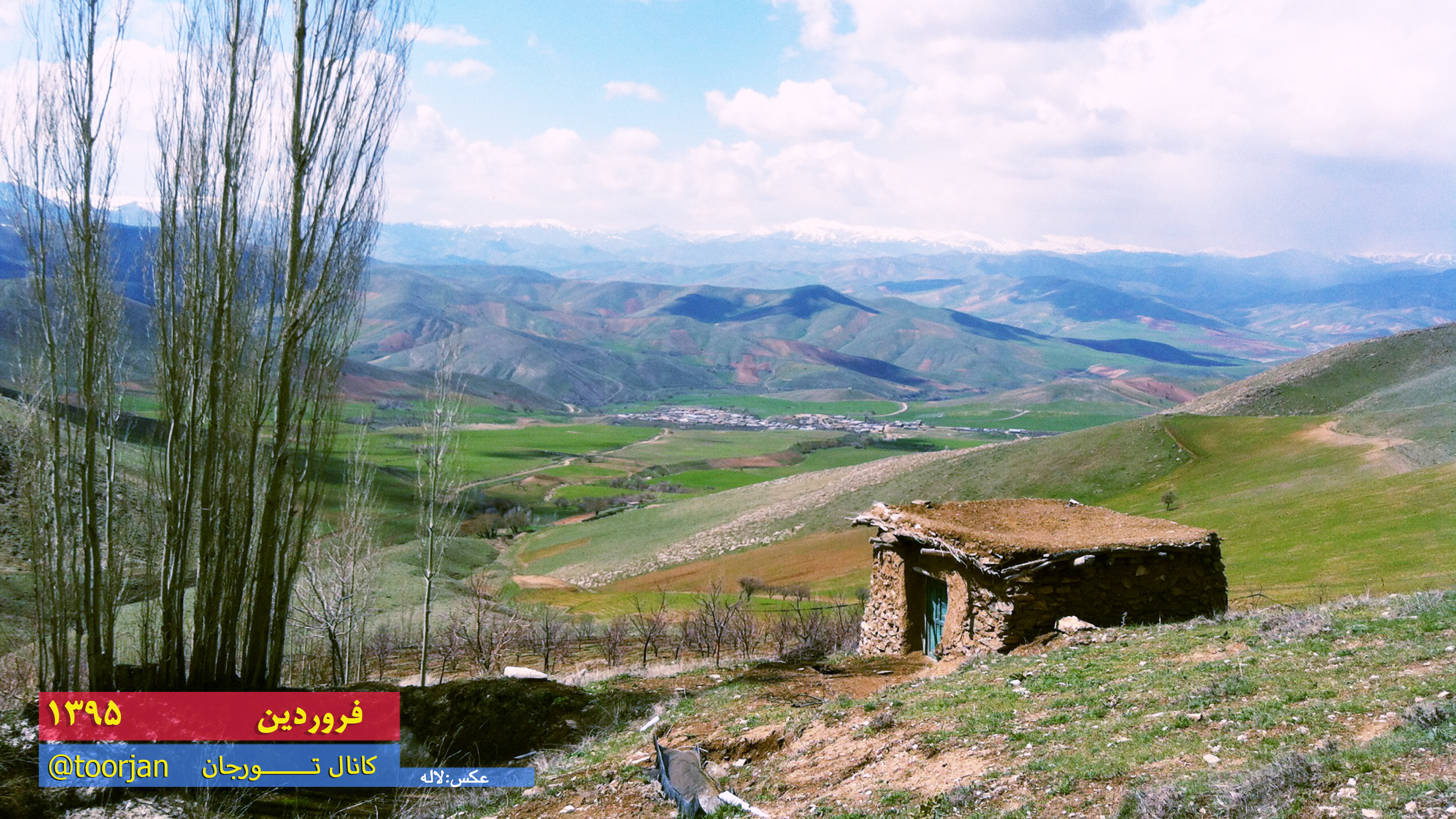

- Location within Iran Location within Iran Kurdistan
- Coordinates: 36°19′15″N 46°00′54″E
- Country: Iran
- Province: Kurdistan
- County: Saqqez
- District: Central
- Rural District: Torjan

Population (2016)
  - Total: 596
- Time zone: UTC+3:30 (IRST)

Torjan (Persian: ترجان) (Note: Also romanized as Torjān; also known as Tūrjān) is a village in Torjan Rural District of the Central District of Saqqez County, Kurdistan province, Iran.

== Demographics ==
=== Ethnicity ===
The village is populated by Kurds.

=== Population ===
At the time of the 2006 National Census, the village's population was 780 in 159 households. The following census in 2011 counted 630 people in 158 households. The 2016 census measured the population of the village as 596 people in 149 households. It was the most populous village in its rural district.
