= Mir Deh =

Village in Kurdistan province, Iran

Mir Deh Persian: ميرده
- Village
- Location within Iran Location within Iran Kurdistan
- Coordinates: 36°08′46″N 46°03′41″E
- Country: Iran
- Province: Kurdistan
- County: Saqqez
- District: Central
- Rural District: Mir Deh

Population (2016)
  - Total: 801
- Time zone: UTC+3:30 (IRST)

Mir Deh (Persian: ميرده) (Note: Also romanized as Mīr Deh, Mīradeh, and Mīredeh; also known as Mīreh Deh) is a village in, and the capital of, Mir Deh Rural District of the Central District of Saqqez County, Kurdistan province, Iran.

== Demographics ==
=== Ethnicity ===
The village is populated by Kurds.

=== Population ===
At the time of the 2006 National Census, the village's population was 805 in 140 households. The following census in 2011 counted 800 people in 161 households. The 2016 census measured the population of the village as 801 people in 182 households. It was the most populous village in its rural district.
