= Qahreman, Kurdistan =

Qahreman قهرمان
- Village
- Location within Iran
- Coordinates: 36°14′01″N 46°00′30″E
- Country: Iran
- Province: Kurdistan
- County: Saqqez
- Bakhsh: Central
- Rural District: Tamugheh

Population (2006)
  - Total: 87
- Time zone: UTC+3:30 (IRST)
  - Summer (DST): UTC+4:30 (IRDT)

Qahreman (Persian: قهرمان, also Romanized as Qahremān) is a village in Tamugheh Rural District, in the Central District of Saqqez County, Kurdistan Province, Iran. At the 2006 census, its population was 87, in 16 families. The village is populated by Kurds.
