= Shilanabad, Kurdistan =

Shilanabad شيلان آباد
- Village
- Location within Iran
- Coordinates: 36°21′36″N 46°01′52″E
- Country: Iran
- Province: Kurdistan
- County: Saqqez
- Bakhsh: Central
- Rural District: Torjan

Population (2006)
  - Total: 107
- Time zone: UTC+3:30 (IRST)
  - Summer (DST): UTC+4:30 (IRDT)

Shilanabad (Persian: شيلان آباد, also Romanized as Shīlānābād) is a village in Torjan Rural District, in the Central District of Saqqez County, Kurdistan Province, Iran. At the 2006 census, its population was 107, in 20 families. The village is populated by Kurds.
