= Sara, Iran =

Village in Kurdistan province, Iran

Sara Persian: سرا
- Village
- Location within Iran Location within Iran Kurdistan
- Coordinates: 36°22′32″N 46°12′53″E
- Country: Iran
- Province: Kurdistan
- County: Saqqez
- District: Central
- Rural District: Sara

Population (2016)
  - Total: 882
- Time zone: UTC+3:30 (IRST)

Sara (Persian: سرا) (Note: Also romanized as Sarā) is a village in, and the capital of, Sara Rural District of the Central District of Saqqez County, Kurdistan province, Iran.

== Demographics ==
=== Ethnicity ===
The village is populated by Kurds.

=== Population ===
At the time of the 2006 National Census, the village's population was 816 in 173 households. The following census in 2011 counted 927 people in 225 households. The 2016 census measured the population of the village as 882 people in 239 households.
