= Kikan =

Kikan may refer to:

- Kikan, Iran, a village in Kurdistan Province, Iran
- Tokumu Kikan (機関), a Japanese World War II intelligence agency
- Organization XIII, a group in the Kingdom Hearts video game series that is known as Jūsan Kikan in Japanese
