= Qahrabad-e Sofla =

Village in Kurdistan province, Iran

(Qarawa)Qahrabad-e Sofla Persian: قهرآباد سفلی
- Village
- Karawa
- Location within Iran Location within Iran Kurdistan
- Coordinates: 36°27′00″N 46°07′31″E
- Country: Iran
- Province: Kurdistan
- County: Saqqez
- District: Central
- Rural District: Torjan

Population (2016)
  - Total: 434
- Time zone: UTC+3:30 (IRST)

(Qarawa)Qahrabad-e Sofla (Persian: قهرآباد سفلی) (Note: Also romanized as Qahrābād-e Soflá) is a village in, and the capital of, Torjan Rural District of the Central District of Saqqez County, Kurdistan province, Iran. The previous capital of the rural district was the village of Baghlujeh.

== Demographics ==
=== Ethnicity ===
Qahrabad-e Sofla is populated by Kurds.

=== Population ===
At the time of the 2006 National Census, the village's population was 506 in 95 households. The following census in 2011 counted 475 people in 118 households. The 2016 census measured the population of the village as 434 people in 122 households.
