= Arab Ughluy-e Olya =

Arab Ughluy-e Olya عرب‌اوغلوی علیا
- Village
- Location within Iran
- Coordinates: 36°21′29″N 46°22′21″E
- Country: Iran
- Province: Kurdistan
- County: Saqqez
- Bakhsh: Central
- Rural District: Sara

Population (2006)
  - Total: 212
- Time zone: UTC+3:30 (IRST)
  - Summer (DST): UTC+4:30 (IRDT)

Arab Ughluy-e Olya (Persian: عرب‌اوغلوی علیا, also Romanized as ‘Arab Ūghlūy-e ‘Olyā; also known as ‘Arab Oghlī-ye ‘Olyā and ‘Arab Ūghlū-ye Bālā) is a village in Sara Rural District, in the Central District of Saqqez County, Kurdistan Province, Iran. At the 2006 census, its population was 212, in 41 families. The village is populated by Kurds.
