= Altun-e Sofla =

Altun-e Sofla آلتون سفلی
- Village
- Location within Iran
- Coordinates: 36°17′07″N 46°16′15″E
- Country: Iran
- Province: Kurdistan
- County: Saqqez
- Bakhsh: Central
- Rural District: Sara

Population (2006)
  - Total: 322
- Time zone: UTC+3:30 (IRST)
  - Summer (DST): UTC+4:30 (IRDT)

Altun-e Sofla (Persian: آلتون سفلی, also Romanized as Altūn-e Soflá) is a village in Sara Rural District, in the Central District of Saqqez County, Kurdistan Province, Iran. At the 2006 census, its population was 322, in 58 families. The village is populated by Kurds.
