= Kani Miran, Kurdistan =

Kani Miran كاني ميران
- Village
- Location within Iran
- Coordinates: 35°36′09″N 46°04′44″E
- Country: Iran
- Province: Kurdistan
- County: Marivan
- Bakhsh: Khav and Mirabad
- Rural District: Khav and Mirabad

Population (2006)
  - Total: 274
- Time zone: UTC+3:30 (IRST)
  - Summer (DST): UTC+4:30 (IRDT)

Kani Miran (Persian: كاني ميران, also Romanized as Kānī Mīrān) is a village in Khav and Mirabad Rural District, Khav and Mirabad District, Marivan County, Kurdistan Province, Iran. At the 2006 census, its population was 274, in 52 families. The village is populated by Kurds.
