= Baghlujeh, Saqqez =

Village in Kurdistan province, Iran

Baghlujeh Persian: باغلوجه
- Village
- Location within Iran Location within Iran Kurdistan
- Coordinates: 36°23′02″N 46°06′27″E
- Country: Iran
- Province: Kurdistan
- County: Saqqez
- District: Central
- Rural District: Torjan

Population (2016)
  - Total: 375
- Time zone: UTC+3:30 (IRST)

Baghlujeh (Persian: باغلوجه) (Note: Also romanized as Bāghlūjeh) is a village in, and the former capital of, Torjan Rural District of the Central District of Saqqez County, Kurdistan province, Iran. The capital of the rural district has been transferred to the village of Qahrabad-e Sofla.

== Demographics ==
=== Ethnicity ===
Baghlujeh is populated by Kurds.

=== Population ===
At the time of the 2006 National Census, the village's population wasAt the 2006 National Census, its population was 478 in 78 households. The following census in 2011 counted 369 people in 97 households. The 2016 census measured the population of the village as 375 people in 102 households.
