= Siah Dar-e Kohneh =

Siah Dar-e Kohneh سياهدر كهنه
- Village
- Location within Iran
- Coordinates: 36°08′35″N 46°01′33″E
- Country: Iran
- Province: Kurdistan
- County: Saqqez
- Bakhsh: Central
- Rural District: Mir Deh

Population (2006)
  - Total: 116
- Time zone: UTC+3:30 (IRST)
  - Summer (DST): UTC+4:30 (IRDT)

Siah Dar-e Kohneh (Persian: سياهدر كهنه, also Romanized as Sīāh Dar-e Kohneh; also known as Sīāh Dar-e Soflá) is a village in Mir Deh Rural District, in the Central District of Saqqez County, Kurdistan Province, Iran. At the 2006 census, its population was 116, in 24 families. The village is populated by Kurds.
