= Piryones =

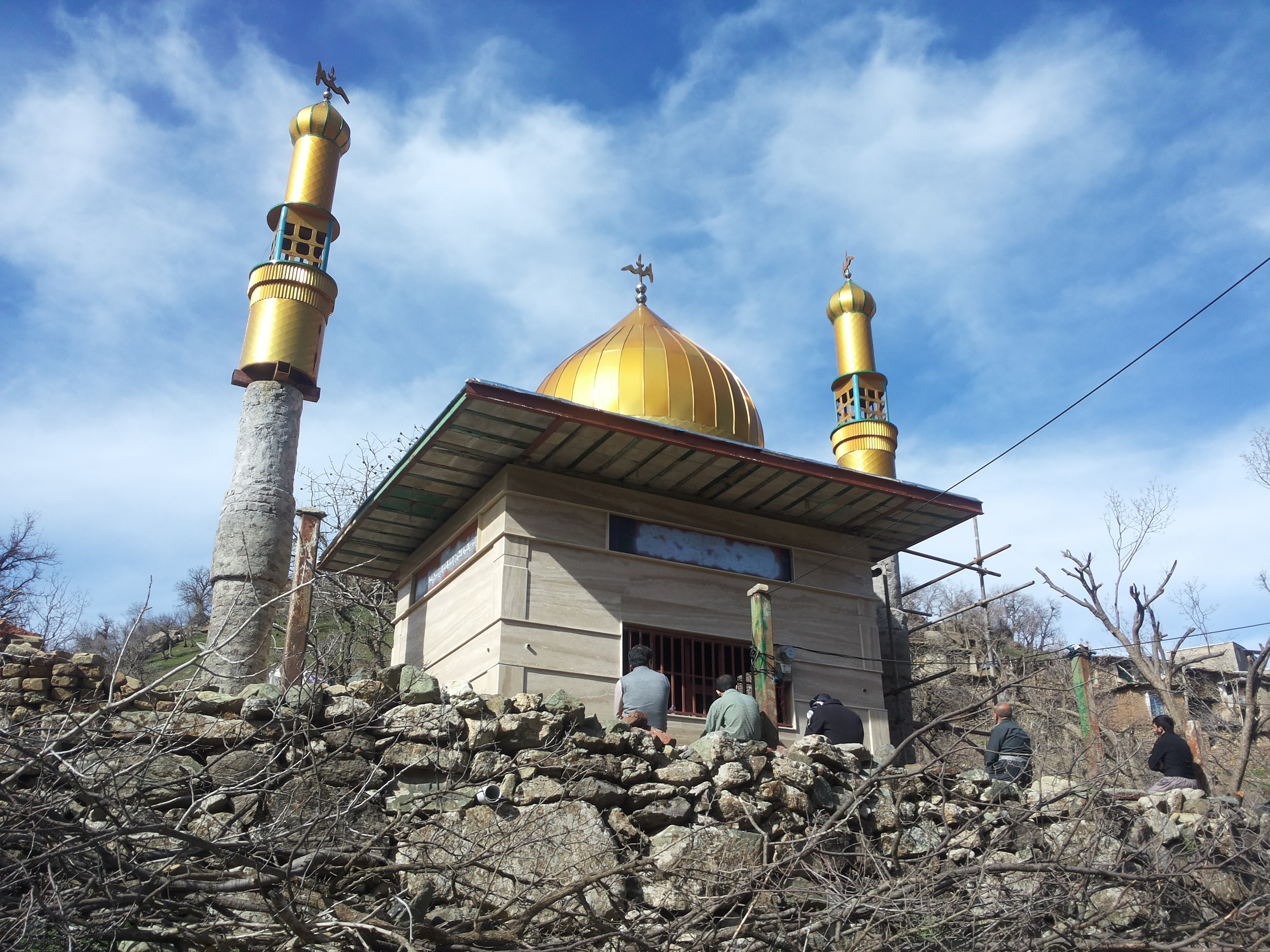
Piryones's shrine in Hanjiran, Mariwan

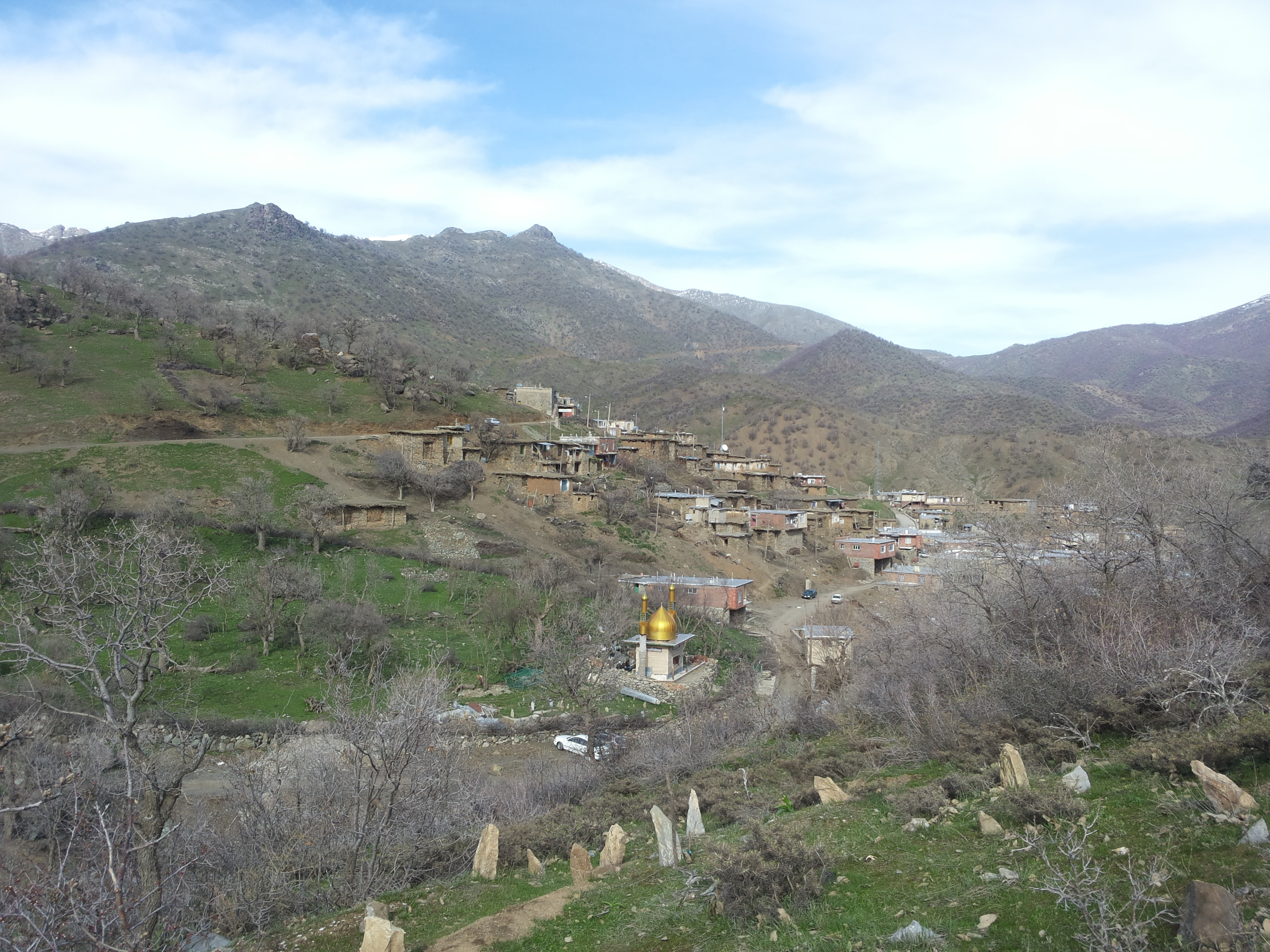
Piryones's shrine

Piryones (Kurdish: پیریۆنس) was a Muslim Kurdish poet and Sufi of 13th century. He was the son of Sheikh Zakariya and the brother of Shah Nimatullah Wali the famous poet and Sufi. His shrine is in Hanjiran, which is a village 20 km from Mariwan. The available poems from Piryones are in Persian. Sheikh Shahabadin Shazeli wrote an ode to Piryones in Kurdish in 16th or 17th century.
