= Seyf-e Olya =

Seyf-e Olya سيف عليا
- Village
- Location within Iran
- Coordinates: 35°35′55″N 46°10′41″E
- Country: Iran
- Province: Kurdistan
- County: Marivan
- Bakhsh: Khav and Mirabad
- Rural District: Khav and Mirabad

Population (2006)
  - Total: 768
- Time zone: UTC+3:30 (IRST)
  - Summer (DST): UTC+4:30 (IRDT)

Seyf-e Olya (Persian: سيف عليا, also Romanized as Seyf-e ‘Olyā; also known as Saif-i-Saru, Sef-e Bālā, and Seyf-e Bālā) is a village in Khav and Mirabad Rural District, Khav and Mirabad District, Marivan County, Kurdistan Province, Iran. At the 2006 census, its population was 768, in 151 families. The village is populated by Kurds.
