= Nechi =

Nechi may refer to:

- Nechí, Colombia
- Nechi, Iran
