= Anjiran =

Anjiran انجيران
- Village
- Location within Iran
- Coordinates: 35°40′59″N 46°12′03″E
- Country: Iran
- Province: Kurdistan
- County: Marivan
- Bakhsh: Khav and Mirabad
- Rural District: Khav and Mirabad

Population (2006)
  - Total: 466
- Time zone: UTC+3:30 (IRST)
  - Summer (DST): UTC+4:30 (IRDT)

Anjiran (Persian: انجيران, also Romanized as Anjīrān) is a village in Khav and Mirabad Rural District, Khav and Mirabad District, Marivan County, Kurdistan Province, Iran. At the 2006 census, its population was 466, in 101 families. The village is populated by Kurds.
