= Mirgah Naqshineh =

Mirgah Naqshineh ميرگه نقشينه
- Village
- Location within Iran
- Coordinates: 36°11′09″N 45°53′49″E
- Country: Iran
- Province: Kurdistan
- County: Saqqez
- Bakhsh: Central
- Rural District: Mir Deh

Population (2006)
  - Total: 340
- Time zone: UTC+3:30 (IRST)
  - Summer (DST): UTC+4:30 (IRDT)

Mirgah Naqshineh (Persian: ميرگه نقشينه, also Romanized as Mīrgah Naqshīneh) is a village in Mir Deh Rural District, in the Central District of Saqqez County, Kurdistan Province, Iran. At the 2006 census, its population was 340, in 56 families. The village is populated by Kurds.
