= Khav =

Khav خاو
- Village
- Location within Iran
- Coordinates: 35°39′17″N 46°03′57″E
- Country: Iran
- Province: Kurdistan
- County: Marivan
- Bakhsh: Khav and Mirabad
- Rural District: Khav and Mirabad

Population (2006)
  - Total: 335
- Time zone: UTC+3:30 (IRST)
  - Summer (DST): UTC+4:30 (IRDT)

Khav (Persian: خاو, also Romanized as Khāv; also known as Khāo, Khāow, and Qala Khāo; Kurdish: خاو or Xaw) is a village in Khav and Mirabad Rural District, Khav and Mirabad District, Marivan County, Kurdistan Province, Iran. At the 2006 census, its population was 335, in 82 families. The village is populated by Kurds.
