= Lazzate Maralbayeva =

French painter and architect (born 1951)

- Born: March 24, 1951; Kokshetau, Kazakhstan
- Known for: Painting

Lazzate Maralbayeva (born March 24, 1951) is a French painter and architect born in Kokshetau, Kazakhstan. Lazzate is known for her paintings that primarily features expressionism, figuration, abstract and portraiture. She has completed AASI in 1976 and graduated in 1988. Lazzate's paintings are in private and public collections in Germany, Belgium, France, Great Britain, Italy, Israel, Kazakhstan, Luxembourg, Russia, Turkey, United States and Yugoslavia.

== Biography ==
Lazzate received her the architect’s degree in 1988 and thereafter worked as head architect in project institutions of Almaty city. She exhibited her first exhibition of Almaty Avangarde in 1989. Lazzate worked as a teacher in the Institute of theater and cinema and in the Academy of Arts. She wrote articles for the Soviet Kazakhstan Encyclopedia and created scenery for the modern-ballet by French ballerina Pascalina Noel Audegond. Lazzate also created a TV Show and short film in 1997–1998.

== Major exhibitions ==
Some of major exhibitions of Lazzate are:

- 2011: Salon ART EN CAPITAL, Grand Palais, Paris,
- 2011: Salon SNBA (Société Nationale de Beaux Arts), Louvre, Paris,
- 2011: Exposition Internationale de l’Association, Hommage à J. F. Millet, Osaka, Aitchi, Toyama, Japan,
- 2009: Salon AIEL Academie International l’Ecole de la Loire, Blois (Médaille de bronze),
- 2008: Galerie Thuillier, Paris,
- 2007: L'Atelier d’ete, Toulouse, France,
- 2007: Les Attirances (Attraction), Almaty.

She was also featured in following exhibitions between 1989-2006:

- Alliance Francaise, Almaty,
- Galerie Le Depot Matignon, Paris,
- Decouverte du Kazakhstan, Luxembourg,
- Galerie Art et Actualite, Paris,
- Furore INN Resort, Furore, Italy,
- Minori incontra l‘Oriente, Minori, Italy,
- Musee des Arts plastiques, Almaty,
- Centre CIAS, Rome, Italy,
- Les journees du Kazakhstan a Bonn et Francfort, Allemagne,
- Le Monde turque, Kazan,
- Premiere exposition officiele de l’Avangarde d’Almaty.

== Paintings ==
Some of her recent paintings are

- ARU, 2013
- Jeanne, 2013
- Concert, 2012
- Meditation, 2012
- Floor Vibrations, 2012
- Dance, 2011
- Race, 2009
- Cell, 2009
- Nomads, 2006
- Song, 2006
- Balcony, 2006
- Matisse, 2006
- Entertainment, February 2006
- NU, January 2003
- Jazz, 1998
- Adriatico, 1995
- Marilyn1
- Paris Défense
- Girl with flower
- Faces
- Spring
- Summer 09_1
- Marilyn Part_bleu
- Cello
- Reveuse
- Song
- Furore Wed Vertical
- Urban Night
- Grande Nue
- The Girl-Fleure
- Park. Promenade.
- The Girl With The Guitar
- Samal Almaty
- Venus Almaty
- Space Rose
