= Kuchek-e Sofla =

Kuchek-e Sofla کوچک سفلی
- Village
- Location within Iran
- Coordinates: 36°25′11″N 46°10′36″E
- Country: Iran
- Province: Kurdistan
- County: Saqqez
- Bakhsh: Central
- Rural District: Sara

Population (2006)
  - Total: 222
- Time zone: UTC+3:30 (IRST)
  - Summer (DST): UTC+4:30 (IRDT)

Kuchek-e Sofla (Persian: کوچک سفلی, also Romanized as Kūchek-e Soflá; also known as Kūchek-e Pā'īn) is a village in Sara Rural District, in the Central District of Saqqez County, Kurdistan Province, Iran. At the 2006 census, its population was 222, in 46 families. The village is populated by Kurds.
