= Seyf-e Sofla =

Seyf-e Sofla سيف سفلي
- Village
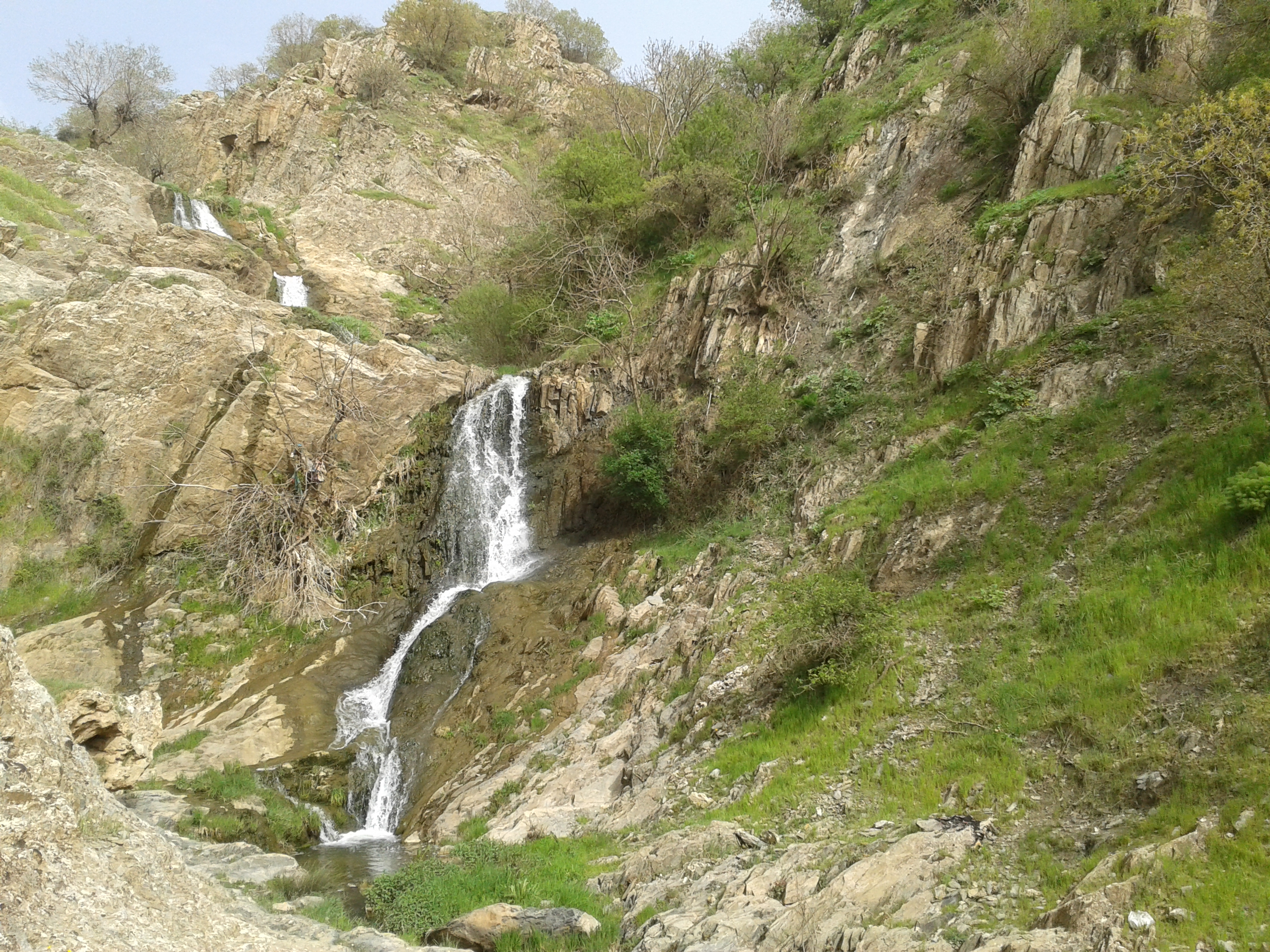
- Sef Lake, Marivan, Kurdistan

- Location within Iran
- Coordinates: 35°34′57″N 46°08′49″E
- Country: Iran
- Province: Kurdistan
- County: Marivan
- Bakhsh: Khav and Mirabad
- Rural District: Khav and Mirabad

Population (2006)
  - Total: 547
- Time zone: UTC+3:30 (IRST)
  - Summer (DST): UTC+4:30 (IRDT)

Seyf-e Sofla (Persian: سيف سفلي, also Romanized as Seyf-e Soflá; also known as Saif Khār, Saik Khār, Sef-e Pā’īn, Seyf, Seyf-e Pā’īn, Siv, and Zif) is a village in Khav and Mirabad Rural District, Khav and Mirabad District, Marivan County, Kurdistan Province, Iran. At the 2006 census, its population was 547 people, in 104 families. The village is populated by Kurds. It is located approximately 15km from Iran's border with Iraq.
