= Tamugheh =

Village in Kurdistan province, Iran

Tamugheh Persian: تموغه
- Village
- Location within Iran Location within Iran Kurdistan
- Coordinates: 36°12′17″N 46°07′28″E
- Country: Iran
- Province: Kurdistan
- County: Saqqez
- District: Central
- Rural District: Tamugheh

Population (2016)
  - Total: 532
- Time zone: UTC+3:30 (IRST)

Tamugheh (Persian: تموغه) (Note: Also romanized as Tamūgheh) is a village in, and the capital of, Tamugheh Rural District of the Central District of Saqqez County, Kurdistan province, Iran.

== Demographics ==
=== Ethnicity ===
The village is populated by Kurds.

=== Population ===
At the time of the 2006 National Census, the village's population was 527 in 108 households. The following census in 2011 counted 688 people in 127 households. The 2016 census measured the population of the village as 532 people in 140 households.
