= Kahrizeh-ye Ayyubi =

Kahrizeh-ye Ayyubi کهریزه ایوبی
- Village
- Location within Iran
- Coordinates: 36°25′45″N 46°05′45″E
- Country: Iran
- Province: Kurdistan
- County: Saqqez
- Bakhsh: Central
- Rural District: Torjan

Population (2006)
  - Total: 403
- Time zone: UTC+3:30 (IRST)
  - Summer (DST): UTC+4:30 (IRDT)

Kahrizeh-ye Ayyubi (Persian: کهریزه ایوبی, also Romanized as Kahrīzeh-ye Ayyūbī) is a village in Torjan Rural District, in the Central District of Saqqez County, Kurdistan Province, Iran. At the 2006 census, its population was 403, in 77 families. The village is populated by Kurds.
