= Kahrizeh, Marivan =

Kahrizeh كهريزه
- Village
- Location within Iran
- Coordinates: 35°39′37″N 46°01′16″E
- Country: Iran
- Province: Kurdistan
- County: Marivan
- Bakhsh: Khav and Mirabad
- Rural District: Khav and Mirabad

Population (2006)
  - Total: 22
- Time zone: UTC+3:30 (IRST)
  - Summer (DST): UTC+4:30 (IRDT)

Kahrizeh (Persian: كهريزه, also Romanized as Kahrīzeh) is a village in Khav and Mirabad Rural District, Khav and Mirabad District, Marivan County, Kurdistan Province, Iran. At the 2006 census, its population was 22, in 8 families. The village is populated by Kurds.
