= Neche =

Neche or NECHE may refer to:

- Neche tribe, a Caddo tribe from Texas
- Neche, Iran
- Neche, North Dakota, United States
- New England Commission of Higher Education
