= Altun-e Olya =

Altun-e Olya آلتون علیا
- Village
- Location within Iran
- Coordinates: 36°18′14″N 46°13′48″E
- Country: Iran
- Province: Kurdistan
- County: Saqqez
- Bakhsh: Central
- Rural District: Sara

Population (2006)
  - Total: 310
- Time zone: UTC+3:30 (IRST)
  - Summer (DST): UTC+4:30 (IRDT)

Altun-e Olya (Persian: آلتون علیا, also Romanized as Āltūn-e ‘Olyā; also known as Āltūn-e Bālā) is a village in Sara Rural District, in the Central District of Saqqez County, Kurdistan Province, Iran. At the 2006 census, its population was 310, in 66 families. The village is populated by Kurds.
