= Qukh, Saqqez =

Qewix قەوخ
- Village
- Location within Iran
- Coordinates: 36°13′15″N 46°15′54″E
- Country: Iran
- Province: Kurdistan
- County: Saqqez
- Bakhsh: Central
- Rural District: Tamugheh

Population (2006)
  - Total: 2,826
- Time zone: UTC+3:30 (IRST)
  - Summer (DST): UTC+4:30 (IRDT)

Qawkh (Persian: قوخ, Kurdish: قه‌وخ or قه‌وه‌خ, also Romanized as Qūkh; transliteration of the Kurmanji Kurdish pronunciation: Qewəx/ Qewix) is a village in Tamugheh Rural District, in the Central District of Saqqez County, Kurdistan Province, Iran. At the 2006 census, its population was 2,826, in 654 families. The village is populated by Kurds.
