= Kuchek-e Olya =

Kuchek-e Olya کوچک علیا
- Village
- Location within Iran
- Coordinates: 36°23′59″N 46°11′08″E
- Country: Iran
- Province: Kurdistan
- County: Saqqez
- Bakhsh: Central
- Rural District: Sara

Population (2006)
  - Total: 271
- Time zone: UTC+3:30 (IRST)
  - Summer (DST): UTC+4:30 (IRDT)

Kuchek-e Olya (Persian: کوچک علیا, also Romanized as Kūchek-e ‘Olyā; also known as Kūchek-e Bālā) is a village in Sara Rural District, in the Central District of Saqqez County, Kurdistan Province, Iran. At the 2006 census, its population was 271, in 54 families. The village is populated by Kurds.
