= Maraneh, Kurdistan =

Village in Kurdistan, Iran

Maraneh مرانه
- Village
- Location within Iran
- Coordinates: 35°34′32″N 46°02′36″E
- Country: Iran
- Province: Kurdistan
- County: Marivan
- Bakhsh: Khav and Mirabad
- Rural District: Khav and Mirabad

Population (2006)
  - Total: 36
- Time zone: UTC+3:30 (IRST)
  - Summer (DST): UTC+4:30 (IRDT)

Maraneh (Persian: مرانه, also Romanized as Marāneh) is a village in Khav and Mirabad Rural District, Khav and Mirabad District, Marivan County, Kurdistan Province, Iran. At the 2006 census, its population was 36, in 9 families. The village is populated by Kurds.
