= Kikan, Iran =

Kikan كيكن
- Village
- Location within Iran
- Coordinates: 35°38′59″N 46°06′15″E
- Country: Iran
- Province: Kurdistan
- County: Marivan
- Bakhsh: Khav and Mirabad
- Rural District: Khav and Mirabad

Population (2006)
  - Total: 234
- Time zone: UTC+3:30 (IRST)
  - Summer (DST): UTC+4:30 (IRDT)

Kikan (Persian: كيكن, also Romanized as Kīkan and Kīken; also known as Kīkin) is a village in Khav and Mirabad Rural District, Khav and Mirabad District, Marivan County, Kurdistan Province, Iran. At the 2006 census, its population was 234, in 52 families. The village is populated by Kurds.
