= Savji, Iran =

Village in Kurdistan province, Iran

Savji Persian: ساوجي
- Village
- Location within Iran Location within Iran Kurdistan
- Coordinates: 35°40′10″N 46°05′07″E
- Country: Iran
- Province: Kurdistan
- County: Marivan
- District: Khav and Mirabad
- Rural District: Khav and Mirabad

Population (2016)
  - Total: 1,143
- Time zone: UTC+3:30 (IRST)

Savji (Persian: ساوجي) (Note: Also romanized as Sāvejī, Sāvjī, and Sāvojī; also known as Sāūjeh, Savchi, and Sowjeh) is a village in Khav and Mirabad Rural District of Khav and Mirabad District, Marivan County, Kurdistan province, Iran, and served as the capital of the district until the capital was transferred to Bardeh Rasheh.

== Demographics ==
=== Ethnicity ===
The village is populated by Kurds.

=== Population ===
At the time of the 2006 National Census, the village's population was 1,295 in 273 households. The following census in 2011 counted 1,152 people in 280 households. The 2016 census measured the population of the village as 1,143 people in 298 households.
