= Kahrizeh, Saqqez =

Village in Kurdistan province, Iran

Kahrizeh Persian: كهريزه
- Village
- Location within Iran Location within Iran Kurdistan
- Coordinates: 36°13′42″N 46°19′27″E
- Country: Iran
- Province: Kurdistan
- County: Saqqez
- District: Central
- Rural District: Sara

Population (2016)
  - Total: 1,568
- Time zone: UTC+3:30 (IRST)

Kahrizeh (Persian: كهريزه) (Note: Also romanized as Kahrīzeh) is a village in Sara Rural District of the Central District of Saqqez County, Kurdistan province, Iran.

== Demographics ==
=== Ethnicity ===
The village is populated by Kurds.

=== Population ===
At the time of the 2006 National Census, the village's population was 874 in 151 households. The following census in 2011 counted 1,263 people in 326 households. The 2016 census measured the population of the village as 1,568 people in 424 households. It was the most populous village in its rural district.
