= Nachi, Iran =

Nachi نچي
- Village
- Location within Iran
- Coordinates: 35°39′12″N 46°07′29″E
- Country: Iran
- Province: Kurdistan
- County: Marivan
- Bakhsh: Khav and Mirabad
- Rural District: Khav and Mirabad

Population (2006)
  - Total: 232
- Time zone: UTC+3:30 (IRST)
  - Summer (DST): UTC+4:30 (IRDT)

Nachi (Persian: نچي, also Romanized as Nachī and Nechī; also known as Neche, Necheh, Nejī, and Netche) is a village in Khav and Mirabad Rural District, Khav and Mirabad District, Marivan County, Kurdistan Province, Iran. At the 2006 census, its population was 232, in 55 families. The village is populated by Kurds.
