= Aychi =

Village in Kurdistan province, Iran

Aychi Persian: آیچی
- Village
- Location within Iran Location within Iran Kurdistan
- Coordinates: 36°12′50″N 46°12′16″E
- Country: Iran
- Province: Kurdistan
- County: Saqqez
- District: Central
- Rural District: Tamugheh

Population (2016)
  - Total: 908
- Time zone: UTC+3:30 (IRST)

Aychi (Persian: آیچی) (Note: Also romanized as Aichi, Aitchi, and Āychī) is a village in Tamugheh Rural District of the Central District of Saqqez County, Kurdistan province, Iran.

== Demographics ==
=== Ethnicity ===
The village is populated by Kurds.

=== Population ===
At the time of the 2006 National Census, the village's population was 769 in 151 households. The following census in 2011 counted 897 people in 209 households. The 2016 census measured the population of the village as 908 people in 242 households. It was the most populous village in its rural district.
