= Bardeh Rasheh, Marivan =

City in Kurdistan province, Iran

Bardeh Rasheh Persian: برده رشه
- City
- Location within Iran Location within Iran Kurdistan
- Coordinates: 35°35′39″N 46°05′41″E
- Country: Iran
- Province: Kurdistan
- County: Marivan
- District: Khav and Mirabad

Population (2016)
  - Total: 1,020
- Time zone: UTC+3:30 (IRST)

Bardeh Rasheh (Persian: برده رشه) (Note: Also romanized as Bardah Rashah; also known as Bardrasheh) is a city in, and the capital of, Khav and Mirabad District of Marivan County, Kurdistan province, Iran. It also serves as the administrative center for Khav and Mirabad Rural District. The previous capital of the district was the village of Savji.

== Demographics ==
=== Ethnicity ===
The city is populated by Kurds.

=== Population ===
At the time of the 2006 National Census, Bardeh Rasheh's population was 919 in 198 households, when it was a village in Khav and Mirabad Rural District. The following census in 2011 counted 1,094 people in 244 households. The 2016 census measured the population as 1,020 people in 271 households, by which time Bardeh Rasheh had been elevated to the status of a city.
