= Kahrizeh-ye Ali Aqa =

Kahrizeh-ye Ali Aqa كهريزه علي اقا
- Village
- Location within Iran
- Coordinates: 36°38′38″N 46°03′52″E
- Country: Iran
- Province: West Azerbaijan
- County: Bukan
- Bakhsh: Central
- Rural District: Akhtachi

Population (2006)
  - Total: 218
- Time zone: UTC+3:30 (IRST)
  - Summer (DST): UTC+4:30 (IRDT)

Kahrizeh-ye Ali Aqa (Persian: كهريزه علي اقا, also Romanized as Kahrīzeh-ye ʿAlī Āqā; also known as Kahrīzeh) is a village in Akhtachi Rural District, in the Central District of Bukan County, West Azerbaijan Province, Iran. At the 2006 census, its population was 218, in 28 families.
