= Kahrizeh, Divandarreh =

Kahrizeh كهريزه
- Village
- Location within Iran
- Coordinates: 35°54′39″N 47°04′26″E
- Country: Iran
- Province: Kurdistan
- County: Divandarreh
- Bakhsh: Central
- Rural District: Howmeh

Population (2006)
  - Total: 184
- Time zone: UTC+3:30 (IRST)
  - Summer (DST): UTC+4:30 (IRDT)

Kahrizeh (Persian: كهريزه, also Romanized as Kahrīzeh; also known as Kariza and Kārīzeh) is a village in Howmeh Rural District, in the Central District of Divandarreh County, Kurdistan Province, Iran. At the 2006 census, its population was 184, in 36 families. The village is populated by Kurds.
