= Kani Miran, Mahabad =

Kani Miran كاني ميران
- Village
- Location within Iran
- Coordinates: 36°31′41″N 45°46′53″E
- Country: Iran
- Province: West Azerbaijan
- County: Mahabad
- Bakhsh: Khalifan
- Rural District: Kani Bazar

Population (2006)
  - Total: 125
- Time zone: UTC+3:30 (IRST)
  - Summer (DST): UTC+4:30 (IRDT)

Kani Miran (Persian: كاني ميران, also Romanized as Kānī Mīrān; also known as Kān Mīrān) is a village in Kani Bazar Rural District, Khalifan District, Mahabad County, West Azerbaijan Province, Iran. At the 2006 census, its population was 125, in 20 families.
