= Kuchek, West Azerbaijan =

Kuchek کوچک
- Village
- Location within Iran
- Coordinates: 38°35′02″N 44°35′36″E
- Country: Iran
- Province: West Azerbaijan
- County: Khoy
- Bakhsh: Central
- Rural District: Firuraq

Population (2006)
  - Total: 215
- Time zone: UTC+3:30 (IRST)
  - Summer (DST): UTC+4:30 (IRDT)

Kuchek (Persian: کوچک, also Romanized as Kūchek) is a village in Firuraq Rural District, in the Central District of Khoy County, West Azerbaijan Province, Iran. At the 2006 census, its population was 215, in 40 families.
