= Rice production in Laos =

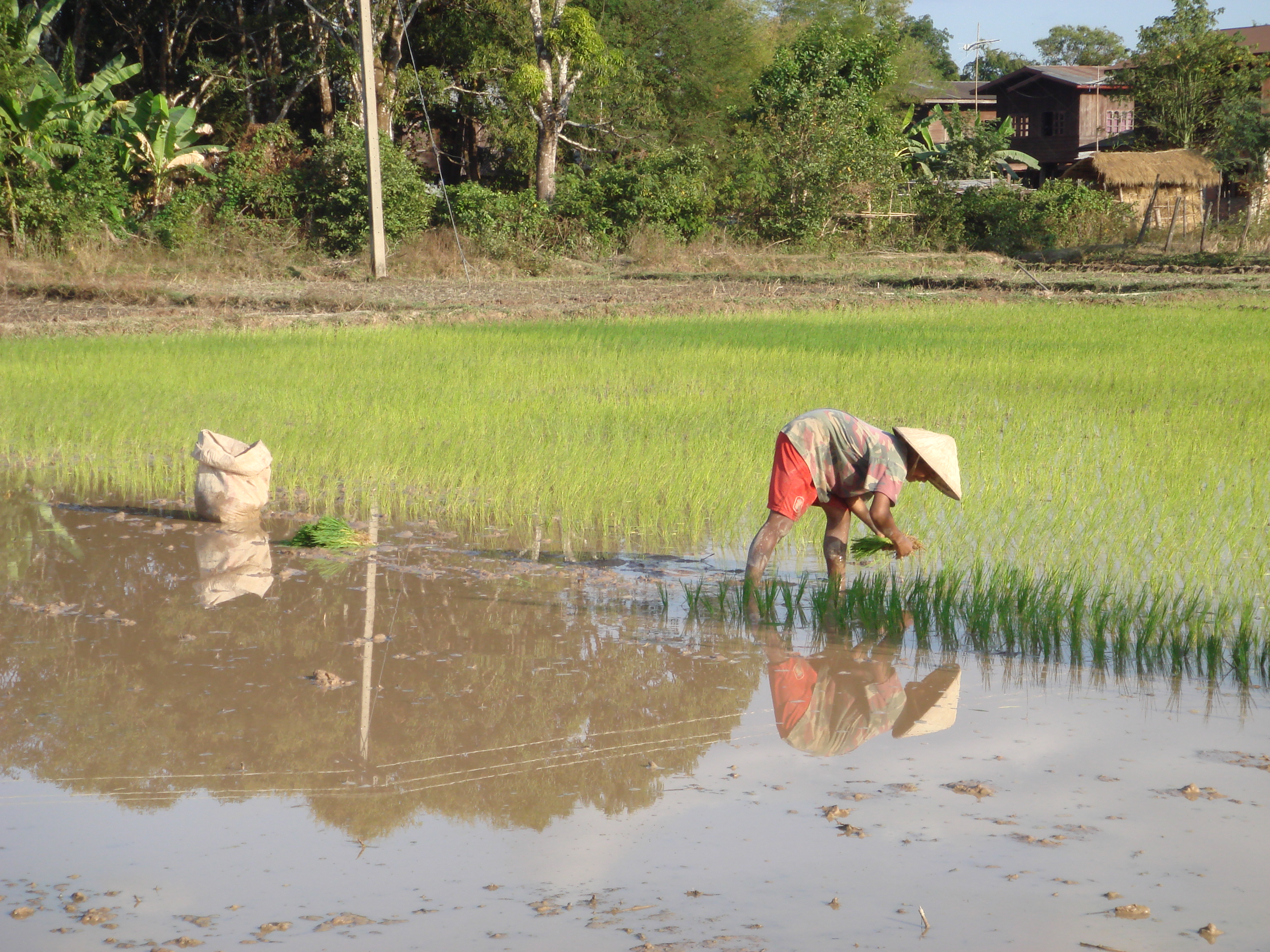
Rice planting in Champasak province

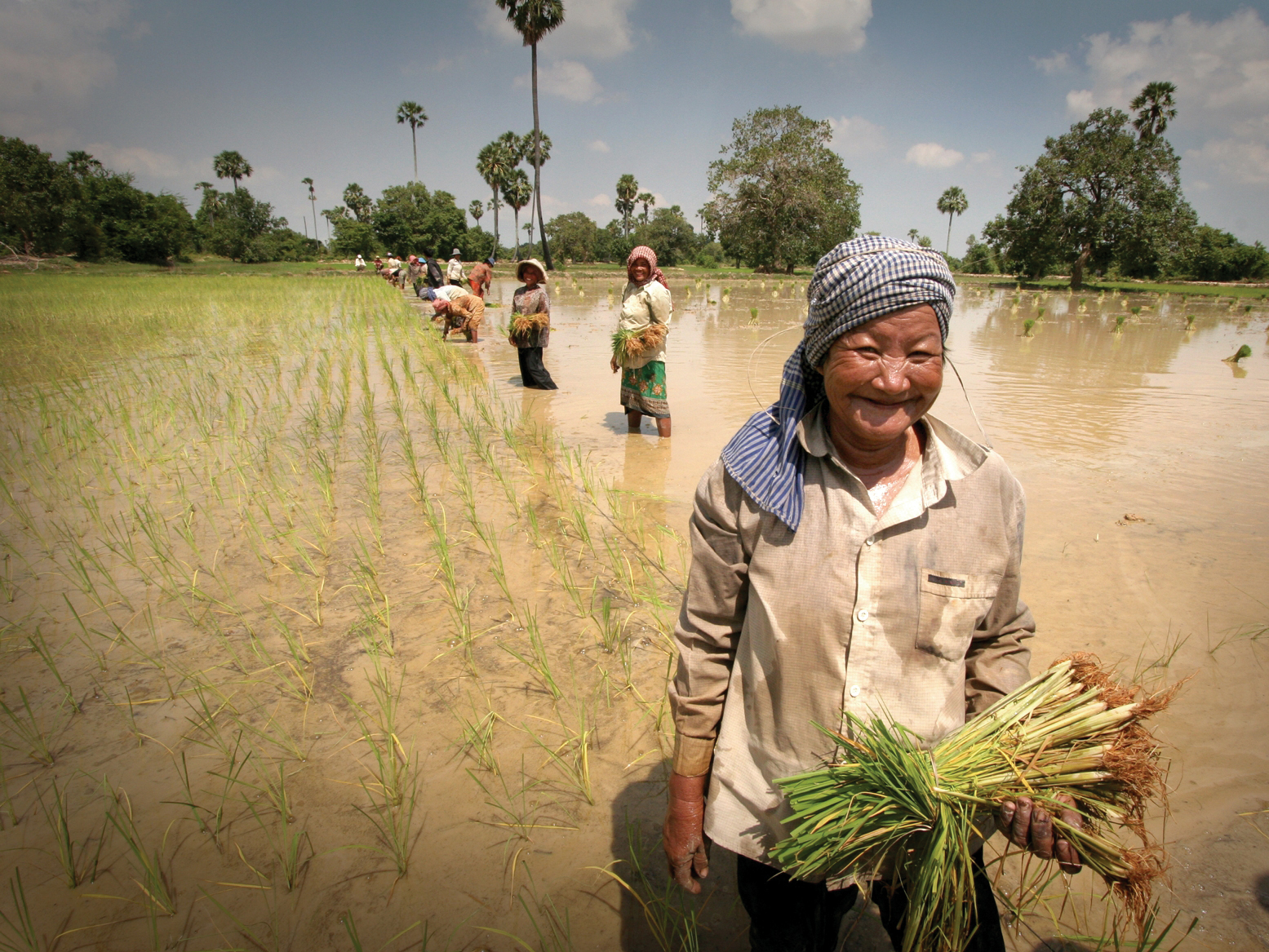
Laotian women planting rice seedlings near Sekong

Rice production in Laos is important to the national economy and food supply.

Rice is a key staple for Laos, and over 60% of arable land is used for its cultivation. Only around 4% of Laos’ total area is arable, which is the smallest amount of arable land of any country in Southeast Asia, due its mountainous terrain (see Geography of Laos). Rice is primarily produced in the country’s lowland areas, with only approximately 11% of production taking place in highland areas. Many of the leading rice-producing provinces are located along the Mekong River (e.g., Vientiane, Khammouan, Bolikhamxai, Savannakhet, Salavan, and Champasak). Average rice farms are small, averaging only around 1–2 hectares (2.5–4.9 acres).

As of 2019, approximately 1.5 million metric tons of rice were produced in Laos. Production can vary significantly between years but has been improving due to the adaption of higher-yield varieties and increased irrigated acreage. However, almost 90% of rice production occurs during the wet season, as only about 12% of the cultivated rice area is irrigated. There is no irrigated acreage in the highland area, limiting highland rice farmers’ growing season to one crop per year (April–November), while some lowland rice farmers have been able to cultivate rice twice a year with irrigated farms near the Mekong River. The lowland main rice crop is usually planted in June and July and harvested from October to December. The lowland off-season crop is usually planted in December and January and harvested in April and May. Glutinous rice production makes up around 80% of all Lao rice production, with most of the remaining production consisting of white and fragrant rice. Mechanization remains quite limited but is becoming more common in major rice-producing provinces.

As rice is critical to rural income and food security, the government regulates the value chain for rice quite closely (e.g., setting price floors for farm gate paddy rice purchases). Similarly, traders seeking to export rice must register with both the national government and the provincial government.

As of 2020, the Lao government was drafting its Agricultural Development Strategy taking into account the new atmosphere presented by the outbreak of COVID-19. COVID-19 came after two years of troubled agricultural production in Laos due to adverse weather conditions and pest infestations, which made the Lao government rethink its current agricultural policies. The Lao government was looking to focus more on small farmers and invest in more research and extension. The Lao government was also placing an emphasis on green and sustainable growing techniques. The government has prioritized increasing rice production and exports with the objective of increasing total paddy rice production to 5,000,000 metric tons (4,900,000 long tons; 5,500,000 short tons) with 1,000,000 metric tons (980,000 long tons; 1,100,000 short tons) of exports by 2025. The Lao government was focusing on increasing irrigated acreage and improving seed varieties to meet its goal.
