= Qukh, Kermanshah =

Qukh قوخ
- Village
- Location within Iran
- Coordinates: 34°01′48″N 46°44′52″E
- Country: Iran
- Province: Kermanshah
- County: Eslamabad-e Gharb
- Bakhsh: Central
- Rural District: Shiyan

Population (2006)
  - Total: 115
- Time zone: UTC+3:30 (IRST)
  - Summer (DST): UTC+4:30 (IRDT)

Qukh (Persian: قوخ, also Romanized as Qūkh) is a village in Shiyan Rural District, in the Central District of Eslamabad-e Gharb County, Kermanshah Province, Iran. At the 2006 census, its population was 115, in 32 families.
