= Kani Miran, Urmia =

Kani Miran كاني ميران
- Village
- Location within Iran
- Coordinates: 37°51′30″N 44°43′15″E
- Country: Iran
- Province: West Azerbaijan
- County: Urmia
- Bakhsh: Sumay-ye Beradust
- Rural District: Sumay-ye Jonubi

Population (2006)
  - Total: 206
- Time zone: UTC+3:30 (IRST)
  - Summer (DST): UTC+4:30 (IRDT)

Kani Miran (Persian: كاني ميران, also Romanized as Kānī Mīrān) is a village in Sumay-ye Jonubi Rural District, Sumay-ye Beradust District, Urmia County, West Azerbaijan Province, Iran. At the 2006 census, it had a population of 206 in 32 families.
