= Kahrizeh-ye Shakak =

Kahrizeh-ye Shakak كهريزه شكاك
- Village
- Location within Iran
- Coordinates: 37°03′15″N 45°17′41″E
- Country: Iran
- Province: West Azerbaijan
- County: Naqadeh
- Bakhsh: Central
- Rural District: Solduz

Population (2006)
  - Total: 150
- Time zone: UTC+3:30 (IRST)
  - Summer (DST): UTC+4:30 (IRDT)

Kahrizeh-ye Shakak (Persian: كهريزه شكاك, also Romanized as Kahrīzeh-ye Shakāk; also known as Kahrīzeh) is a village in Solduz Rural District, in the Central District of Naqadeh County, West Azerbaijan Province, Iran. At the 2006 census, its population was 150, in 36 families.
