= Sekong (city) =

Sekong ເຊກອງ
- Municipality
- Location in Laos
- Coordinates: 15°20′40″N 106°43′03″E
- Country: Laos

Population (2015)
  - Total: 35,000

Sekong (or Xekong; Lao: ເຊກອງ, pronounced [séː kɔ̀ːŋ]) is the capital city of Sekong Province, Laos. It was created in 1984 after it was ascertained that Ban Phon's unexploded ordnance made it uninhabitable.

== Climate ==
Climate data for Sekong (1990–2019)
Month	Jan	Feb	Mar	Apr	May	Jun	Jul	Aug	Sep	Oct	Nov	Dec	Year
Mean daily maximum °C (°F)	32.2 (90.0)	34.1 (93.4)	36.1 (97.0)	36.0 (96.8)	34.0 (93.2)	32.4 (90.3)	31.2 (88.2)	31.1 (88.0)	31.6 (88.9)	31.9 (89.4)	31.8 (89.2)	31.2 (88.2)	32.8 (91.1)
Mean daily minimum °C (°F)	15.8 (60.4)	17.9 (64.2)	21.4 (70.5)	23.5 (74.3)	24.4 (75.9)	24.4 (75.9)	24.0 (75.2)	23.9 (75.0)	23.7 (74.7)	22.2 (72.0)	20.1 (68.2)	17.0 (62.6)	21.5 (70.7)
Average precipitation mm (inches)	2 (0.1)	10 (0.4)	37 (1.5)	87 (3.4)	164 (6.5)	189 (7.4)	303 (11.9)	272 (10.7)	239 (9.4)	98 (3.9)	32 (1.3)	4 (0.2)	1,437 (56.7)
Source: Food and Agriculture Organization of the United Nations
