= Torjan Rural District =

Rural district in Kurdistan province, Iran

Torjan Rural District Persian: دهستان ترجان
- Rural District
- Location within Iran Location within Iran Kurdistan
- Coordinates: 36°21′51″N 46°04′12″E
- Country: Iran
- Province: Kurdistan
- County: Saqqez
- District: Central
- Capital: Qahrabad-e Sofla

Population (2016)
  - Total: 3,939
- Time zone: UTC+3:30 (IRST)

Torjan Rural District (Persian: دهستان ترجان) is in the Central District of Saqqez County, Kurdistan province, Iran. Its capital is the village of Qahrabad-e Sofla. The previous capital of the rural district was the village of Baghlujeh.

== Demographics ==
=== Population ===
At the time of the 2006 National Census, the rural district's population was 5,030 in 946 households. There were 4,240 inhabitants in 1,054 households at the following census of 2011. The 2016 census measured the population of the rural district as 3,939 in 1,057 households. The most populous of its 19 villages was Torjan, with 596 people.
