= Tamugheh Rural District =

Rural district in Kurdistan province, Iran

Tamugheh Rural District Persian: دهستان تموغه
- Rural District
- Location within Iran Location within Iran Kurdistan
- Coordinates: 36°12′05″N 46°04′56″E
- Country: Iran
- Province: Kurdistan
- County: Saqqez
- District: Central
- Capital: Tamugheh

Population (2016)
  - Total: 5,748
- Time zone: UTC+3:30 (IRST)

Tamugheh Rural District (Persian: دهستان تموغه) is in the Central District of Saqqez County, Kurdistan province, Iran. Its capital is the village of Tamugheh.

== Demographics ==
=== Population ===
At the time of the 2006 National Census, the rural district's population was 8,890 in 1,810 households. There were 12,009 inhabitants in 2,928 households at the following census of 2011. The 2016 census measured the population of the rural district as 5,748 in 1,462 households. The most populous of its 16 villages was Aychi, with 908 people.
