= Sara Rural District =

Rural district in Kurdistan province, Iran

Sara Rural District Persian: دهستان سرا
- Rural District
- Location within Iran Location within Iran Kurdistan
- Coordinates: 36°18′56″N 46°17′39″E
- Country: Iran
- Province: Kurdistan
- County: Saqqez
- District: Central
- Capital: Sara

Population (2016)
  - Total: 11,842
- Time zone: UTC+3:30 (IRST)

Sara Rural District (Persian: دهستان سرا) is in the Central District of Saqqez County, Kurdistan province, Iran. Its capital is the village of Sara.

== Demographics ==
=== Population ===
At the time of the 2006 National Census, the rural district's population was 12,408 in 2,491 households. There were 11,268 inhabitants in 2,829 households at the following census of 2011. The 2016 census measured the population of the rural district as 11,842 in 3,174 households. The most populous of its 47 villages was Kahrizeh, with 1,568 people.
