= Mir Deh Rural District =

Rural district in Kurdistan province, Iran

Mir Deh Rural District Persian: دهستان ميرده
- Rural District
- Location within Iran Location within Iran Kurdistan
- Coordinates: 36°07′17″N 45°59′56″E
- Country: Iran
- Province: Kurdistan
- County: Saqqez
- District: Central
- Capital: Mir Deh

Population (2016)
  - Total: 4,774
- Time zone: UTC+3:30 (IRST)

Mir Deh Rural District (Persian: دهستان ميرده) is in the Central District of Saqqez County, Kurdistan province, Iran. Its capital is the village of Mir Deh.

== Demographics ==
=== Population ===
At the time of the 2006 National Census, the rural district's population was 6,322 in 1,131 households. There were 5,266 inhabitants in 1,165 households at the following census of 2011. The 2016 census measured the population of the rural district as 4,774 in 1,097 households. The most populous of its 25 villages was Mir Deh, with 801 people.
