= Khav and Mirabad Rural District =

Rural district in Kurdistan province, Iran

Khav and Mirabad Rural District Persian: دهستان خاو و میرآباد
- Rural District
- Location within Iran Location within Iran Kurdistan
- Coordinates: 35°37′00″N 46°07′55″E
- Country: Iran
- Province: Kurdistan
- County: Marivan
- District: Khav and Mirabad
- Capital: Bardeh Rasheh

Population (2016)
  - Total: 9,868
- Time zone: UTC+3:30 (IRST)

Khav and Mirabad Rural District (Persian: دهستان خاو و میرآباد) is in Khav and Mirabad District of Marivan County, Kurdistan province, Iran. It is administered from the city of Bardeh Rasheh.

== Demographics ==
=== Population ===
At the time of the 2006 National Census, the rural district's population was 11,849 in 2,513 households. There were 11,411 inhabitants in 2,737 households at the following census of 2011. The 2016 census measured the population of the rural district as 9,868 in 2,682 households. The most populous of its 39 villages was Sardush, with 1,439 people.
