= Khav and Mirabad District =

District in Kurdistan province, Iran

Khav and Mirabad District Persian: بخش خاو و میرآباد
- District
- Location within Iran Location within Iran Kurdistan
- Coordinates: 35°37′00″N 46°07′55″E
- Country: Iran
- Province: Kurdistan
- County: Marivan
- Capital: Bardeh Rasheh

Population (2016)
  - Total: 10,888
- Time zone: UTC+3:30 (IRST)

Khav and Mirabad District (Persian: بخش خاو و میرآباد) is in Marivan County, Kurdistan province, Iran. Its capital is the city of Bardeh Rasheh. The previous capital of the district was the village of Savji.

== History ==
After the 2011 National Census, the village of Bardeh Rasheh was elevated to the status of a city.

== Demographics ==
=== Population ===
At the time of the 2006 census, the district's population was 11,849 in 2,513 households. The following census in 2011 counted 11,411 people in 2,737 households. The 2016 census measured the population of the district as 10,888 inhabitants in 2,953 households.

=== Administrative divisions ===
Khav and Mirabad District Population
| Administrative Divisions | 2006 | 2011 | 2016 |
|---|---|---|---|
| Khav and Mirabad RD | 11,849 | 11,411 | 9,868 |
| Bardeh Rasheh (city) | | | 1,020 |
| Total | 11,849 | 11,411 | 10,888 |
RD = Rural District
