= Central District (Saqqez County) =

District in Kurdistan province, Iran

Central District (Saqqez County) Persian: بخش مرکزی شهرستان سقز
- District
- Location within Iran Location within Iran Kurdistan
- Coordinates: 36°14′05″N 46°11′55″E
- Country: Iran
- Province: Kurdistan
- County: Saqqez
- Capital: Saqqez

Population (2016)
  - Total: 191,561
- Time zone: UTC+3:30 (IRST)

The Central District of Saqqez County (Persian: بخش مرکزی شهرستان سقز) is in Kurdistan province, Iran. Its capital is the city of Saqqez.

== Demographics ==
=== Population ===
At the time of the 2006 National Census, the district's population was 163,999 in 37,714 households. The following census in 2011 counted 172,521 people in 45,238 households. The 2016 census measured the population of the district as 191,561 inhabitants in 55,278 households.

=== Administrative divisions ===
Central District (Saqqez County) Population
Administrative Divisions	2006	2011	2016
Mir Deh RD	6,322	5,266	4,774
Sara RD	12,408	11,268	11,842
Tamugheh RD	8,890	12,009	5,748
Torjan RD	5,030	4,240	3,939
Saqqez (city)	131,349	139,738	165,258
Total	163,999	172,521	191,561
RD = Rural District
