= Qaleh Gah =

Qaleh Gah or Qalehgah (Persian: قلعه گاه) may refer to various places in Iran:

- Qaleh Gah, Ravansar, Kermanshah Province
- Qaleh Gah, Dehgolan, Kurdistan Province
- Qaleh Gah, Divandarreh, Kurdistan Province
- Qaleh Gah, Kamyaran, Kurdistan Province
- Qalehgah-e Gudarz, Saqqez County, Kurdistan Province
- Qaleh Gah-e Kurkur, Saqqez County, Kurdistan Province
- Qaleh Gah-e Sharif, Saqqez County, Kurdistan Province
- Qaleh Gah, Sarvabad, Kurdistan Province
