= Qaleh Joqeh =

Qaleh Joqeh or Qaleh Jeqeh or Qaleh Jeqqeh (Persian: قلعه جقه) may refer to:

- Qaleh Joqeh, Divandarreh
- Qaleh Jeqeh-ye Sofla, Divandarreh County
- Qaleh Jeqqeh, Saheb, Saqqez County
- Qaleh Joqeh, Tilakuh, Saqqez County

== See also ==
- Qaleh Jugheh
- Qaleh Juqeh
