= Tilakuh =

Tilakuh or Tilkuh (Persian: تيلكوه) may refer to:

- Tilakuh, Dehgolan
- Tilkuh, Kamyaran
- Tilku
- Tilkuh, Saqqez
- Tilakuh Rural District, in Saqqez County
