= Qeshlaq Pol =

Qeshlaq Pol قشلاق پل
- Village
- Location within Iran
- Coordinates: 36°05′25″N 46°20′27″E
- Country: Iran
- Province: Kurdistan
- County: Saqqez
- Bakhsh: Sarshiv
- Rural District: Zu ol Faqr

Population (2006)
  - Total: 161
- Time zone: UTC+3:30 (IRST)
  - Summer (DST): UTC+4:30 (IRDT)

Qeshlaq Pol (Persian: قشلاق پل, also Romanized as Qeshlāq Pol) is a village in Zu ol Faqr Rural District, Sarshiv District, Saqqez County, Kurdistan Province, Iran. At the 2006 census, its population was 161, in 40 families. The village is populated by Kurds.
