= Chagharlu =

Chagharlu چاغرلو
- Village
- Location within Iran
- Coordinates: 36°17′33″N 46°33′05″E
- Country: Iran
- Province: Kurdistan
- County: Saqqez
- Bakhsh: Ziviyeh
- Rural District: Saheb

Population (2006)
  - Total: 382
- Time zone: UTC+3:30 (IRST)
  - Summer (DST): UTC+4:30 (IRDT)

Chagharlu (Persian: چاغرلو, also Romanized as Chāgharlū and Chāgherlū) is a village in Saheb Rural District, Ziviyeh District, Saqqez County, Kurdistan Province, Iran. At the 2006 census, its population was 382, in 88 families. The village is populated by Kurds.
