= Mam Seyf ol Din =

Mam Seyf ol Din مام سيف الدين
- Village
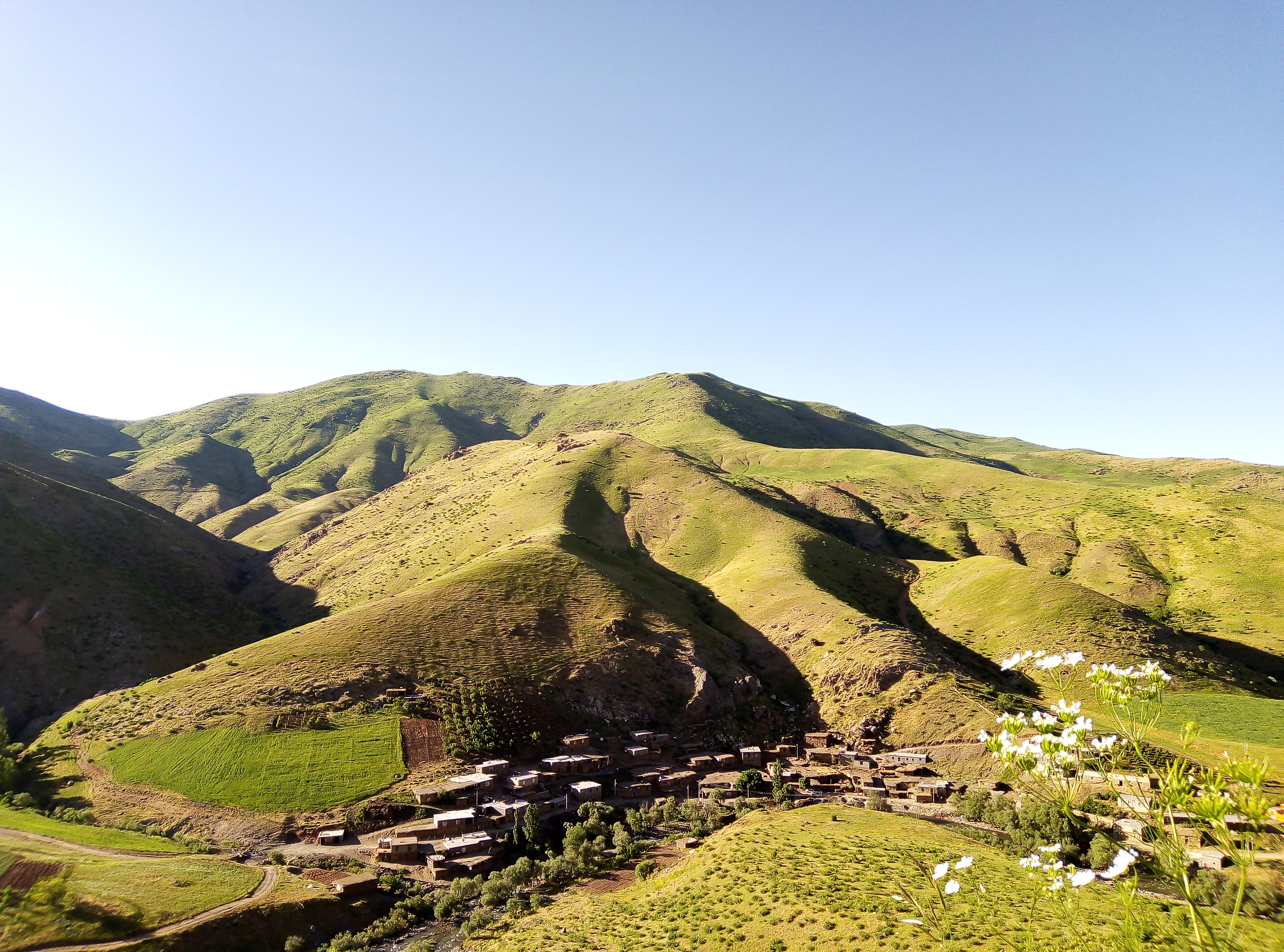

- Location within Iran
- Coordinates: 35°54′27″N 46°12′22″E
- Country: Iran
- Province: Kurdistan
- County: Saqqez
- Bakhsh: Sarshiv
- Rural District: Zu ol Faqr

Population (2006)
  - Total: 121
- Time zone: UTC+3:30 (IRST)
  - Summer (DST): UTC+4:30 (IRDT)

Mam Seyf ol Din (Persian: مام سيف الدين, also Romanized as Mam Seyf ol Dīn, Mam Seyf od Dīn, and Mām Sefod Dīn; also known as Mamsevedar, Mamsevedor, and Mamsūh Dār) is a village in Zu ol Faqr Rural District, Sarshiv District, Saqqez County, Kurdistan Province, Iran. At the 2006 census, its population was 121, in 22 families. The village is populated by Kurds.
