= Sulakan =

Sulakan سولاكان
- Village
- Location within Iran
- Coordinates: 36°16′34″N 46°46′12″E
- Country: Iran
- Province: Kurdistan
- County: Saqqez
- Bakhsh: Ziviyeh
- Rural District: Gol Tappeh

Population (2006)
  - Total: 97
- Time zone: UTC+3:30 (IRST)
  - Summer (DST): UTC+4:30 (IRDT)

Sulakan (Persian: سولاكان, also Romanized as Sūlākān; also known as Sūleh Kān and Sūlehkān) is a village in Gol Tappeh Rural District, Ziviyeh District, Saqqez County, Kurdistan Province, Iran. At the 2006 census, its population was 97, in 23 families. The village is populated by Kurds.
