= Qeshlaq-e Molla =

Qeshlaq-e Molla قشلاق ملا
- Village
- Location within Iran
- Coordinates: 36°10′50″N 46°18′34″E
- Country: Iran
- Province: Kurdistan
- County: Saqqez
- Bakhsh: Sarshiv
- Rural District: Zu ol Faqr

Population (2006)
  - Total: 30
- Time zone: UTC+3:30 (IRST)
  - Summer (DST): UTC+4:30 (IRDT)

Qeshlaq-e Molla (Persian: قشلاق ملا, also Romanized as Qeshlāq-e Mollā) is a village in Zu ol Faqr Rural District, Sarshiv District, Saqqez County, Kurdistan Province, Iran. At the 2006 census, its population was 30, in 10 families. The village is populated by Kurds.
