= Kandulan =

Kandulan كندولان
- Village
- Location within Iran
- Coordinates: 36°06′42″N 46°26′10″E
- Country: Iran
- Province: Kurdistan
- County: Saqqez
- Bakhsh: Ziviyeh
- Rural District: Emam

Population (2006)
  - Total: 168
- Time zone: UTC+3:30 (IRST)
  - Summer (DST): UTC+4:30 (IRDT)

Kandulan (Persian: كندولان, also Romanized as Kandūlān) is a village in Emam Rural District, Ziviyeh District, Saqqez County, Kurdistan Province, Iran. At the 2006 census, its population was 168, in 32 families. The village is populated by Kurds.
