= Kani Seyyed =

Village in Kurdistan, Iran

Kani Seyyed كاني سيد
- Village
- Location within Iran
- Coordinates: 36°02′36″N 46°27′17″E
- Country: Iran
- Province: Kurdistan
- County: Saqqez
- Bakhsh: Ziviyeh
- Rural District: Khvor Khvoreh

Population (2006)
  - Total: 89
- Time zone: UTC+3:30 (IRST)
  - Summer (DST): UTC+4:30 (IRDT)

Kani Seyyed (Persian: كاني سيد, also Romanized as Kānī Seyyed) is a village in Khvor Khvoreh Rural District, Ziviyeh District, Saqqez County, Kurdistan Province, Iran. At the 2006 census, its population was 89, in 14 families. The village is populated by Kurds.
