= Seyf Taleh =

Seyf Taleh سيف طاله
- Village
- Location within Iran
- Coordinates: 35°57′13″N 46°16′36″E
- Country: Iran
- Province: Kurdistan
- County: Saqqez
- Bakhsh: Sarshiv
- Rural District: Zu ol Faqr

Population (2006)
  - Total: 228
- Time zone: UTC+3:30 (IRST)
  - Summer (DST): UTC+4:30 (IRDT)

Seyf Taleh (Persian: سيف طاله, also Romanized as Seyf Ţāleh and known as Sefatāleh) is a village in Zu ol Faqr Rural District, Sarshiv District, Saqqez County, Kurdistan Province, Iran. At the 2006 census, its population was 228, in 33 families. The village is populated by Kurds.
