= Qazi Khan =

Qazi Khan قاضي خان
- Village
- Location within Iran
- Coordinates: 36°11′14″N 46°41′26″E
- Country: Iran
- Province: Kurdistan
- County: Saqqez
- Bakhsh: Ziviyeh
- Rural District: Emam

Population (2006)
  - Total: 43
- Time zone: UTC+3:30 (IRST)
  - Summer (DST): UTC+4:30 (IRDT)

Qazi Khan (Persian: قاضي خان, also Romanized as Qāẕī Khān) is a village in Emam Rural District, Ziviyeh District in Saqqez County, Kurdistan Province, Iran. At the 2006 census, its population was 43, in 8 families. The village is populated by Kurds.
