= Sar Takaltu =

Sar Takaltu سرتكلتو
- Village
- Location within Iran
- Coordinates: 36°08′40″N 46°16′29″E
- Country: Iran
- Province: Kurdistan
- County: Saqqez
- Bakhsh: Sarshiv
- Rural District: Zu ol Faqr

Population (2006)
  - Total: 317
- Time zone: UTC+3:30 (IRST)
  - Summer (DST): UTC+4:30 (IRDT)

Sar Takaltu (Persian: سرتكلتو, also Romanized as Sar Takaltū; also known as Sar Taktalū) is a village in Zu ol Faqr Rural District, Sarshiv District, Saqqez County, Kurdistan Province, Iran. The 2006 census recorded that the village had a population of 317, made up of 56 families. The majority of residents are Kurds.
