= Dowlat Qaleh =

Dowlat Qaleh دولت قلعه
- Village
- Location within Iran
- Coordinates: 36°01′37″N 46°33′12″E
- Country: Iran
- Province: Kurdistan
- County: Saqqez
- Bakhsh: Ziviyeh
- Rural District: Khvor Khvoreh

Population (2006)
  - Total: 557
- Time zone: UTC+3:30 (IRST)
  - Summer (DST): UTC+4:30 (IRDT)

Dowlat Qaleh (Persian: دولت قلعه, also Romanized as Dowlat Qal‘eh) is a village in Khvor Khvoreh Rural District, Ziviyeh District, Saqqez County, Kurdistan Province, Iran. At the 2006 census, its population was 557, in 109 families. The village is populated by Kurds.
