= Khvor Khvoreh =

Khvor Khvoreh or Khowr Khowreh or Khowrkhowreh or Khur Khureh (Persian: خورخوره), also rendered as Khoorkhoreh or Khorkhoreh or Khor Khowreh or Khor Kurreh, may refer to various places in Iran:

- Khvor Khvoreh, Bijar, Kurdistan Province
- Khor Khowreh, Sanandaj, Kurdistan Province
- Khvor Khvoreh, Saqqez, Kurdistan Province
- Khvor Khvoreh, Qazvin
- Khvor Khvoreh, Bukan, West Azerbaijan Province
- Khvor Khvoreh, Mahabad, West Azerbaijan Province
- Khvor Khvoreh, Salmas, West Azerbaijan Province
- Khvor Khvoreh Rural District (disambiguation)
