= Qareh Baghreh =

Qareh Baghreh قره بغره
- Village
- Location within Iran
- Coordinates: 35°59′14″N 46°24′39″E
- Country: Iran
- Province: Kurdistan
- County: Saqqez
- Bakhsh: Ziviyeh
- Rural District: Khvor Khvoreh

Population (2006)
  - Total: 206
- Time zone: UTC+3:30 (IRST)
  - Summer (DST): UTC+4:30 (IRDT)

Qareh Baghreh (Persian: قره بغره, also Romanized as Qareh Boghreh; also known as Qara Baqra, Qareh Baqreh, and Qareh Boqreh) is a village in Khvor Khvoreh Rural District, Ziviyeh District, Saqqez County, Kurdistan Province, Iran. At the 2006 census, its population was 206, in 32 families. The village is populated by Kurds.
