= Hajji Mamdan =

Hajji Mamdan حاجی‌ممدان
- Village
- Location within Iran
- Coordinates: 35°57′19″N 46°20′37″E
- Country: Iran
- Province: Kurdistan
- County: Saqqez
- Bakhsh: Sarshiv
- Rural District: Chehel Cheshmeh-ye Gharbi

Population (2006)
  - Total: 341
- Time zone: UTC+3:30 (IRST)
  - Summer (DST): UTC+4:30 (IRDT)

Hajji Mamdan (Persian: حاجی‌ممدان, also Romanized as Ḩājjī Mamdān; also known as Haji Mamadan, Hāji Māmdān, Ḩājī Mamedān, Ḩajī Moḩammad Dān, Ḩājjī Moḩammadān, and Ḩājj Mamz̄ān) is a village in Chehel Cheshmeh-ye Gharbi Rural District, Sarshiv District, Saqqez County, Kurdistan Province, Iran. At the 2006 census, its population was 341, in 59 families. The village is populated by Kurds.
