= Kani Seyyed Shokereh =

Kani Seyyed Shokereh كاني سيدشكره
- Village
- Location within Iran
- Coordinates: 36°09′15″N 46°48′33″E
- Country: Iran
- Province: Kurdistan
- County: Saqqez
- Bakhsh: Ziviyeh
- Rural District: Tilakuh

Population (2006)
  - Total: 55
- Time zone: UTC+3:30 (IRST)
  - Summer (DST): UTC+4:30 (IRDT)

Kani Seyyed Shokereh (Persian: كاني سيدشكره, also Romanized as Kānī Seyyed Shokereh; also known as Kānī-ye Seyyed Shekar) is a village in Tilakuh Rural District, Ziviyeh District, Saqqez County, Kurdistan Province, Iran. At the 2006 census, its population was 55, in 15 families. The village is populated by Kurds.
