= Darreh Vazan-e Sofla =

Darreh Vazan-e Sofla دره وزان سفلي
- Village
- Location within Iran
- Coordinates: 36°09′16″N 46°28′09″E
- Country: Iran
- Province: Kurdistan
- County: Saqqez
- Bakhsh: Ziviyeh
- Rural District: Saheb

Population (2006)
  - Total: 190
- Time zone: UTC+3:30 (IRST)
  - Summer (DST): UTC+4:30 (IRDT)

Darreh Vazan-e Sofla (Persian: دره وزان سفلي, also Romanized as Darreh Vazān-e Soflá; also known as Darreh Vazān-e Pā'īn) is a village in Saheb Rural District, Ziviyeh District, Saqqez County, Kurdistan Province, Iran. At the 2006 census, its population was 190, in 34 families. The village is populated by Kurds.
