= Darreh Esmailiyeh =

Darreh Esmailiyeh دره اسمعيله
- Village
- Location within Iran
- Coordinates: 36°09′00″N 46°25′36″E
- Country: Iran
- Province: Kurdistan
- County: Saqqez
- Bakhsh: Ziviyeh
- Rural District: Saheb

Population (2006)
  - Total: 263
- Time zone: UTC+3:30 (IRST)
  - Summer (DST): UTC+4:30 (IRDT)

Darreh Esmailiyeh (Persian: دره اسمعيله, also Romanized as Darreh Esmā‘īlīyeh) is a village in Saheb Rural District, Ziviyeh District, Saqqez County, Kurdistan Province, Iran. At the 2006 census, its population was 263, in 46 families. The village is populated by Kurds.
