= Aleyar =

Aleyar آليار
- Village
- Location within Iran
- Coordinates: 36°19′54″N 46°47′54″E
- Country: Iran
- Province: Kurdistan
- County: Saqqez
- Bakhsh: Ziviyeh
- Rural District: Gol Tappeh

Population (2006)
  - Total: 114
- Time zone: UTC+3:30 (IRST)
  - Summer (DST): UTC+4:30 (IRDT)

Aleyar (Persian: آليار, also Romanized as Āleyār) is a village in Gol Tappeh Rural District, Ziviyeh District, Saqqez County, Kurdistan Province, Iran. At the 2006 census, its population was 114, in 23 families. The village is populated by Kurds.
