= Arab Lang =

Village in Zu ol Faqr Rural District, Kurdistan Province, Iran

Arab Lang عرب لنگ
- Village
- Location within Iran
- Coordinates: 36°05′15″N 46°15′33″E
- Country: Iran
- Province: Kurdistan
- County: Saqqez
- Bakhsh: Sarshiv
- Rural District: Zu ol Faqr

Population (2006)
  - Total: 266
- Time zone: UTC+3:30 (IRST)
  - Summer (DST): UTC+4:30 (IRDT)

Arab Lang (Persian: عرب لنگ, also Romanized as ‘Arab Lang and ‘Arab-e Lang; also known as Palang Dezh) is a village in Zu ol Faqr Rural District, Sarshiv District, Saqqez County, Kurdistan Province, Iran. At the 2006 census, its population was 266, in 56 families. The village is populated by Kurds.
