= Qarah Nav =

Qarah Nav قره ناو
- Village
- Location within Iran
- Coordinates: 36°17′24″N 46°39′25″E
- Country: Iran
- Province: Kurdistan
- County: Saqqez
- Bakhsh: Ziviyeh
- Rural District: Gol Tappeh

Population (2006)
  - Total: 156
- Time zone: UTC+3:30 (IRST)
  - Summer (DST): UTC+4:30 (IRDT)

Qarah Nav (Persian: قره ناو, also Romanized as Qarah Nāv and Qareh Nāv) is a village in Gol Tappeh Rural District, Ziviyeh District, Saqqez County, Kurdistan Province, Iran. At the 2006 census, its population was 156, in 33 families. The village is populated by Kurds.
