= Baghcheleh =

Baghcheleh باغچله
- Village
- Location within Iran
- Coordinates: 36°10′06″N 46°17′02″E
- Country: Iran
- Province: Kurdistan
- County: Saqqez
- Bakhsh: Sarshiv
- Rural District: Zu ol Faqr

Population (2006)
  - Total: 81
- Time zone: UTC+3:30 (IRST)
  - Summer (DST): UTC+4:30 (IRDT)

Baghcheleh (Persian: باغچله, also Romanized as Bāghcheleh) is a village in Zu ol Faqr Rural District, Sarshiv District, Saqqez County, Kurdistan Province, Iran. At the 2006 census, its population was 81, in 18 families. The village is populated by Kurds.
