= Khvosh Qeshlaq =

Khvosh Qeshlaq خوش قشلاق
- Village
- Location within Iran
- Coordinates: 36°23′18″N 46°43′51″E
- Country: Iran
- Province: Kurdistan
- County: Saqqez
- Bakhsh: Ziviyeh
- Rural District: Gol Tappeh

Population (2006)
  - Total: 391
- Time zone: UTC+3:30 (IRST)
  - Summer (DST): UTC+4:30 (IRDT)

Khvosh Qeshlaq (Persian: خوش قشلاق, also Romanized as Khvosh Qeshlāq and Khūsh Qeshlāq) is a village in Gol Tappeh Rural District, Ziviyeh District, Saqqez County, Kurdistan Province, Iran. At the 2006 census, its population was 391, in 81 families. The village is populated by Kurds.
