= Adinan =

Adinan Persian: آدینان Sorani Kurdish: ئایێنان
- Village
- Location within Iran
- Coordinates: 36°12′32″N 46°25′38″E
- Country: Iran
- Province: Kurdistan
- County: Saqqez
- Bakhsh: Ziviyeh
- Rural District: Saheb

Population (2006)
  - Total: 212
- Time zone: UTC+3:30 (IRST)
  - Summer (DST): UTC+4:30 (IRDT)

Adinan (Persian: آدینان, also Romanized as Ādīnān, Sorani Kurdish: ئایێنان) is a village in Saheb Rural District, Ziviyeh District, Saqqez County, Kurdistan Province, Iran. At the 2006 census, its population was 212, in 42 families. The village is populated by Kurds.
