= Hajji Abdol =

Hajji Abdol حاجي عبدل
- Village
- Location within Iran
- Coordinates: 35°53′24″N 46°14′22″E
- Country: Iran
- Province: Kurdistan
- County: Saqqez
- Bakhsh: Sarshiv
- Rural District: Zu ol Faqr

Population (2006)
  - Total: 362
- Time zone: UTC+3:30 (IRST)
  - Summer (DST): UTC+4:30 (IRDT)

Hajji Abdol (Persian: حاجي عبدل, also Romanized as Ḩājjī 'Abdol and Ḩājī 'Abdol; also known as Hāji 'Abdul) is a village in Zu ol Faqr Rural District, Sarshiv District, Saqqez County, Kurdistan Province, Iran. At the 2006 census, its population was 362, in 66 families. The village is populated by Kurds.
