= Kachal Mangan =

Kachal Mangan كچل منگان
- Village
- Location within Iran
- Coordinates: 36°06′52″N 46°20′32″E
- Country: Iran
- Province: Kurdistan
- County: Saqqez
- Bakhsh: Sarshiv
- Rural District: Zu ol Faqr

Population (2006)
  - Total: 242
- Time zone: UTC+3:30 (IRST)
  - Summer (DST): UTC+4:30 (IRDT)

Kachal Mangan (Persian: كچل منگان, also Romanized as Kachal Mangān) is a village in Zu ol Faqr Rural District, Sarshiv District, Saqqez County, Kurdistan Province, Iran. At the 2006 census, its population was 242, in 55 families. The village is populated by Kurds.
