= Mazrah =

Mazrah مزره
- Village
- Location within Iran
- Coordinates: 36°03′49″N 46°19′26″E
- Country: Iran
- Province: Kurdistan
- County: Saqqez
- Bakhsh: Sarshiv
- Rural District: Zu ol Faqr

Population (2006)
  - Total: 196
- Time zone: UTC+3:30 (IRST)
  - Summer (DST): UTC+4:30 (IRDT)

Mazrah (Persian: مزره) is a village in Zu ol Faqr Rural District, Sarshiv District, Saqqez County, Kurdistan Province, Iran. At the 2006 census, its population was 196, in 36 families. The village is populated by Kurds.
