= Abu ol Mowmen =

Abu ol Mowmen ابو الموًمن
- Village
- Location within Iran
- Coordinates: 36°17′00″N 46°43′00″E
- Country: Iran
- Province: Kurdistan
- County: Saqqez
- Bakhsh: Ziviyeh
- Rural District: Gol Tappeh

Population (2006)
  - Total: 116
- Time zone: UTC+3:30 (IRST)
  - Summer (DST): UTC+4:30 (IRDT)

Abu ol Mowmen (Persian: ابو الموًمن, also Romanized as ‘Abū ol Mowmen; also known as ‘Abd ol Momen and Abū ol Ma‘man) is a village in Gol Tappeh Rural District, Ziviyeh District, Saqqez County, Kurdistan Province, Iran. At the 2006 census, its population was 116, in 25 families. The village is populated by Kurds.
