= Darreh Vazan-e Olya =

Darreh Vazan-e Olya دره وزان عليا
- Village
- Location within Iran
- Coordinates: 36°07′16″N 46°24′17″E
- Country: Iran
- Province: Kurdistan
- County: Saqqez
- Bakhsh: Ziviyeh
- Rural District: Saheb

Population (2006)
  - Total: 101
- Time zone: UTC+3:30 (IRST)
  - Summer (DST): UTC+4:30 (IRDT)

Darreh Vazan-e Olya (Persian: دره وزان عليا, also Romanized as Darreh Vazān-e ‘Olyā; also known as Darreh Vazān-e Bālā) is a village in Saheb Rural District, Ziviyeh District, Saqqez County, Kurdistan Province, Iran. At the 2006 census, its population was 101, in 16 families. The village is populated by Kurds.
