= Kavmeleh =

Kavmeleh كاومله
- Village
- Location within Iran
- Coordinates: 35°56′31″N 46°17′44″E
- Country: Iran
- Province: Kurdistan
- County: Saqqez
- Bakhsh: Sarshiv
- Rural District: Chehel Cheshmeh-ye Gharbi

Population (2006)
  - Total: 170
- Time zone: UTC+3:30 (IRST)
  - Summer (DST): UTC+4:30 (IRDT)

Kavmeleh (Persian: كاومله, also Romanized as Kāvmeleh and Kāvmaleh; also known as Karamela and Karmaleh) is a village in Chehel Cheshmeh-ye Gharbi Rural District, Sarshiv District, Saqqez County, Kurdistan Province, Iran. At the 2006 census, its population was 170, in 30 families. The village is populated by Kurds.
