= Sorkh Musa =

Sorkh Musa سرخ موسي
- Village
- Location within Iran
- Coordinates: 36°00′31″N 46°37′08″E
- Country: Iran
- Province: Kurdistan
- County: Saqqez
- Bakhsh: Ziviyeh
- Rural District: Khvor Khvoreh

Population (2006)
  - Total: 192
- Time zone: UTC+3:30 (IRST)
  - Summer (DST): UTC+4:30 (IRDT)

Sorkh Musa (Persian: سرخ موسي, also Romanized as Sorkh Mūsá) is a village in Khvor Khvoreh Rural District, Ziviyeh District, Saqqez County, Kurdistan Province, Iran. At the 2006 census, its population was 192 Kurds, in 37 families.
