= Tamber Beyg =

Village in Iran

Tamber Beyg تمبربيگ
- Village
- Location within Iran
- Coordinates: 36°07′25″N 46°36′55″E
- Country: Iran
- Province: Kurdistan
- County: Saqqez
- Bakhsh: Ziviyeh
- Rural District: Emam

Population (2006)
  - Total: 278
- Time zone: UTC+3:30 (IRST)
  - Summer (DST): UTC+4:30 (IRDT)

Tamber Beyg (Persian: تمبربيگ; also known as Tamer Beyg and Tamīr Beg) is a village in Emam Rural District, Ziviyeh District, Saqqez County, Kurdistan Province, Iran. At the 2006 census, its population was 278, in 54 families. The village is populated by Kurds.
