= Tumar Qamish =

Tumar Qamish طومارقاميش
- Village
- Location within Iran
- Coordinates: 36°22′12″N 46°37′43″E
- Country: Iran
- Province: Kurdistan
- County: Saqqez
- Bakhsh: Ziviyeh
- Rural District: Gol Tappeh

Population (2006)
  - Total: 414
- Time zone: UTC+3:30 (IRST)
  - Summer (DST): UTC+4:30 (IRDT)

Tumar Qamish (Persian: طومارقاميش, also Romanized as Ţūmār Qamīsh) is a village in Gol Tappeh Rural District, Ziviyeh District, Saqqez County, Kurdistan Province, Iran. At the 2006 census, its population was 414, in 75 families. The village is populated by Kurds.
