= Kamantu =

Kamantu كمنتو
- Village
- Location within Iran
- Coordinates: 36°11′28″N 46°21′30″E
- Country: Iran
- Province: Kurdistan
- County: Saqqez
- Bakhsh: Ziviyeh
- Rural District: Saheb

Population (2006)
  - Total: 241
- Time zone: UTC+3:30 (IRST)
  - Summer (DST): UTC+4:30 (IRDT)

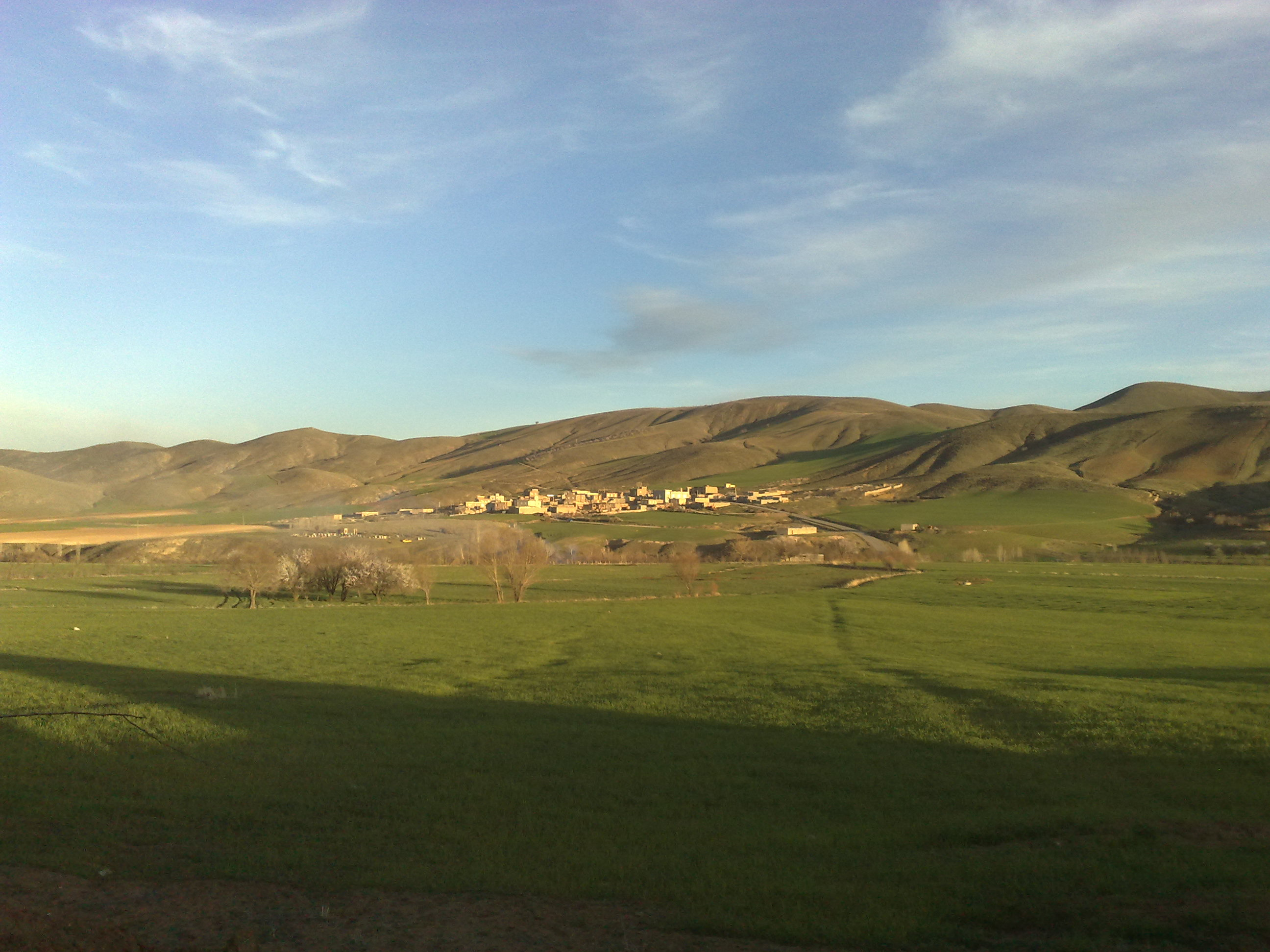
Kamatouh village, 2013

Kamantu (Persian: كمنتو, also Romanized as Kamantū) is a village in Saheb Rural District, Ziviyeh District, Saqqez County, Kurdistan Province, Iran. At the 2006 census, its population was 241, in 50 families. The village is populated by Kurds.
