= Qashoq =

Qashoq قاشق
- Village
- Location within Iran
- Coordinates: 36°24′00″N 46°32′00″E
- Country: Iran
- Province: Kurdistan
- County: Saqqez
- Bakhsh: Ziviyeh
- Rural District: Gol Tappeh

Population (2006)
  - Total: 113
- Time zone: UTC+3:30 (IRST)
  - Summer (DST): UTC+4:30 (IRDT)

Qashoq (Persian: قاشق, also Romanized as Qāshoq) is a village in Gol Tappeh Rural District, Ziviyeh District, Saqqez County, Kurdistan Province, Iran. At the 2006 census, its population was 113, in 22 families. The village is populated by Kurds. Its other name is Hasan abad Khani.
