= Shamseh =

Shamseh شمسه
- Village
- Location within Iran
- Coordinates: 36°06′18″N 46°44′44″E
- Country: Iran
- Province: Kurdistan
- County: Saqqez
- Bakhsh: Ziviyeh
- Rural District: Tilakuh

Population (2006)
  - Total: 354
- Time zone: UTC+3:30 (IRST)
  - Summer (DST): UTC+4:30 (IRDT)

Shamseh (Persian: شمسه) is a village in Tilakuh Rural District, Ziviyeh District, Saqqez County, Kurdistan Province, Iran. At the 2006 census, its population was 354, in 71 families. The village is populated by Kurds.
