= Chumolu =

Chumolu چوملو
- Village
- Location within Iran
- Coordinates: 36°19′30″N 46°37′45″E
- Country: Iran
- Province: Kurdistan
- County: Saqqez
- Bakhsh: Ziviyeh
- Rural District: Gol Tappeh

Population (2006)
  - Total: 479
- Time zone: UTC+3:30 (IRST)
  - Summer (DST): UTC+4:30 (IRDT)

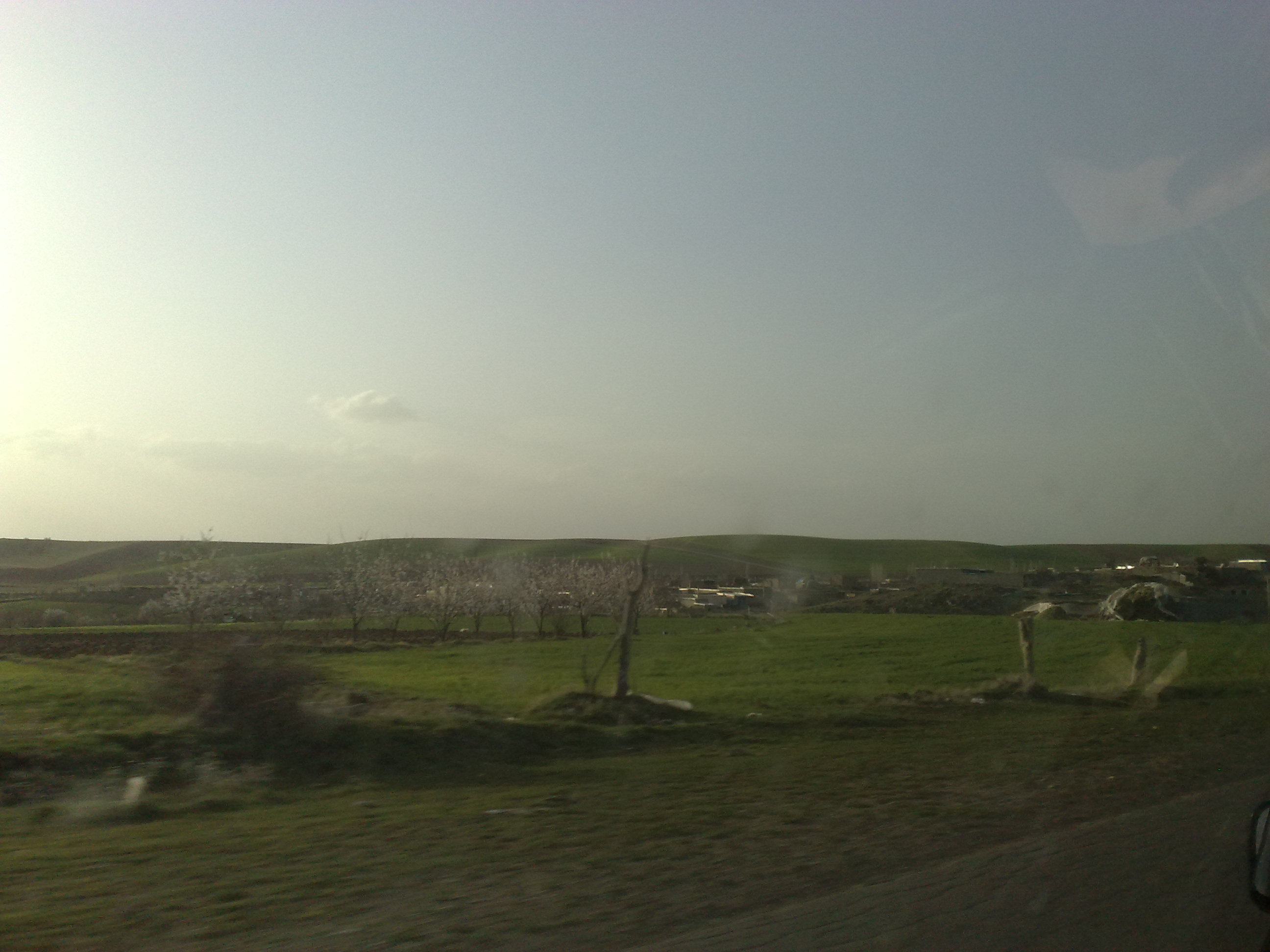
Chumolu

Chumolu (Persian: چوملو, also Romanized as Chūmolū; also known as Charmlū) is a village in Gol Tappeh Rural District, Ziviyeh District, Saqqez County, Kurdistan Province, Iran. In the 2006 census, the village's population was 479, in 90 families. The village is populated by Kurds.
