= Taleh Jar =

Taleh Jar طاله جار
- Village
- Location within Iran
- Coordinates: 36°00′47″N 46°18′50″E
- Country: Iran
- Province: Kurdistan
- County: Saqqez
- Bakhsh: Sarshiv
- Rural District: Zu ol Faqr

Population (2006)
  - Total: 250
- Time zone: UTC+3:30 (IRST)
  - Summer (DST): UTC+4:30 (IRDT)

Taleh Jar (Persian: طاله جار, also Romanized as Ţāleh Jār; also known as Ţālījār) is a village in Zu ol Faqr Rural District, Sarshiv District, Saqqez County, Kurdistan Province, Iran. At the 2006 census, its population was 250, in 48 families. The village is populated by Kurds.
