= Darreh Sheykhan =

Darreh Sheykhan دره شيخان
- Village
- Location within Iran
- Coordinates: 36°01′46″N 46°36′24″E
- Country: Iran
- Province: Kurdistan
- County: Saqqez
- Bakhsh: Ziviyeh
- Rural District: Khvor Khvoreh

Population (2006)
  - Total: 130
- Time zone: UTC+3:30 (IRST)
  - Summer (DST): UTC+4:30 (IRDT)

Darreh Sheykhan (Persian: دره شيخان, also Romanized as Darreh Sheykhān) is a village in Khvor Khvoreh Rural District, Ziviyeh District, Saqqez County, Kurdistan Province, Iran. At the 2006 census, its population was 130, in 25 families. The village is populated by Kurds.
