= Kupeh Qaran =

Kupeh Qaran كوپه قران
- Village
- Location within Iran
- Coordinates: 36°22′07″N 46°52′49″E
- Country: Iran
- Province: Kurdistan
- County: Saqqez
- Bakhsh: Ziviyeh
- Rural District: Gol Tappeh

Population (2006)
  - Total: 208
- Time zone: UTC+3:30 (IRST)
  - Summer (DST): UTC+4:30 (IRDT)

Kupeh Qaran (Persian: كوپه قران, also Romanized as Kūpeh Qarān and Kūpehqarān) is a village in Gol Tappeh Rural District, Ziviyeh District, Saqqez County, Kurdistan Province, Iran. At the 2006 census, its population was 208, in 39 families. The village is populated by Kurds.
