= Gureh Qaleh =

Gureh Qaleh گوره قلعه
- Village
- Location within Iran
- Coordinates: 36°05′41″N 46°17′40″E
- Country: Iran
- Province: Kurdistan
- County: Saqqez
- Bakhsh: Sarshiv
- Rural District: Zu ol Faqr

Population (2006)
  - Total: 491
- Time zone: UTC+3:30 (IRST)
  - Summer (DST): UTC+4:30 (IRDT)

Gureh Qaleh (Persian: گوره قلعه, also Romanized as Gūreh Qal‘eh) is a village in Zu ol Faqr Rural District, Sarshiv District, Saqqez County, Kurdistan Province, Iran. At the 2006 census, its population was 491, in 98 families. The village is populated by Kurds.
