= Chi Chi Khvar =

Chi Chi Khvar چيچي خوار
- Village
- Location within Iran
- Coordinates: 36°15′45″N 46°35′24″E
- Country: Iran
- Province: Kurdistan
- County: Saqqez
- Bakhsh: Ziviyeh
- Rural District: Saheb

Population (2006)
  - Total: 147
- Time zone: UTC+3:30 (IRST)
  - Summer (DST): UTC+4:30 (IRDT)

Chi Chi Khvar (Persian: چيچي خوار, also Romanized as Chī Chī Khvār and Chīchīkhavār) is a village in Saheb Rural District, Ziviyeh District, Saqqez County, Kurdistan Province, Iran. At the 2006 census, its population was 147, in 28 families. The village is populated by Kurds.
