= Mollasalar =

Mollasalar ملاسالار
- Village
- Location within Iran
- Coordinates: 36°11′46″N 46°45′07″E
- Country: Iran
- Province: Kurdistan
- County: Saqqez
- Bakhsh: Ziviyeh
- Rural District: Tilakuh

Population (2006)
  - Total: 229
- Time zone: UTC+3:30 (IRST)
  - Summer (DST): UTC+4:30 (IRDT)

Mollasalar (Persian: ملاسالار, also Romanized as Mollāsālār; also known as Malānsālār) is a village in Tilakuh Rural District, Ziviyeh District, Saqqez County, Kurdistan Province, Iran. At the 2006 census, its population was 229, in 35 families. The village is populated by Kurds.
