= Kislan =

Kislan كيسلان
- Village
- Location within Iran
- Coordinates: 36°14′43″N 46°30′16″E
- Country: Iran
- Province: Kurdistan
- County: Saqqez
- Bakhsh: Ziviyeh
- Rural District: Saheb

Population (2006)
  - Total: 131
- Time zone: UTC+3:30 (IRST)
  - Summer (DST): UTC+4:30 (IRDT)

Kislan (Persian: كيسلان, also Romanized as Kīslān; also known as Kīseh Lān) is a village in Saheb Rural District, Ziviyeh District, Saqqez County, Kurdistan Province, Iran. At the 2006 census, its population was 131, in 30 families. The village is populated by Kurds.
