= Somaqlu =

Somaqlu سماقلو
- Village
- Location within Iran
- Coordinates: 36°05′38″N 46°11′07″E
- Country: Iran
- Province: Kurdistan
- County: Saqqez
- Bakhsh: Sarshiv
- Rural District: Zu ol Faqr

Population (2006)
  - Total: 393
- Time zone: UTC+3:30 (IRST)
  - Summer (DST): UTC+4:30 (IRDT)

Somaqlu (Persian: سماقلو, also Romanized as Somāqlū; also known as Esmāqlū and Somāghlū) is a village in Zu ol Faqr Rural District, Sarshiv District, Saqqez County, Kurdistan Province, Iran. At the 2006 census, its population was 393, in 73 families. The village is populated by Kurds.
