= Darreh Abi =

Darreh Abi دره آبي
- Village
- Location within Iran
- Coordinates: 36°03′51″N 46°11′23″E
- Country: Iran
- Province: Kurdistan
- County: Saqqez
- Bakhsh: Sarshiv
- Rural District: Zu ol Faqr

Population (2006)
  - Total: 138
- Time zone: UTC+3:30 (IRST)
  - Summer (DST): UTC+4:30 (IRDT)

Darreh Abi (Persian: دره آبي, also Romanized as Darreh Ābī) is a village in Zu ol Faqr Rural District, Sarshiv District, Saqqez County, Kurdistan Province, Iran. At the 2006 census, its population was 138, in 29 families. The village is populated by Kurds.
