= Bastam, Kurdistan =

Village in Kurdistan province, Iran

Bastam Persian: بسطام
- Village
- Location within Iran Location within Iran Kurdistan
- Coordinates: 35°51′44″N 46°23′40″E
- Country: Iran
- Province: Kurdistan
- County: Saqqez
- District: Sarshiv
- Rural District: Chehel Cheshmeh-ye Gharbi

Population (2016)
  - Total: 538
- Time zone: UTC+3:30 (IRST)

Bastam (Persian: بسطام) (Note: Also romanized as Basţām) is a village in Chehel Cheshmeh-ye Gharbi Rural District of Sarshiv District, Saqqez County, Kurdistan province, Iran.

== Demographics ==
=== Ethnicity ===
The village is populated by Kurds.

=== Population ===
At the time of the 2006 National Census, the village's population was 519 in 104 households. The following census in 2011 counted 603 people in 124 households. The 2016 census measured the population of the village as 538 people in 144 households. It was the most populous village in its rural district.
