= Gavkach-e Olya =

Gavkach-e Olya گاو كچ عليا
- Village
- Location within Iran
- Coordinates: 35°59′31″N 46°41′27″E
- Country: Iran
- Province: Kurdistan
- County: Saqqez
- Bakhsh: Ziviyeh
- Rural District: Khvor Khvoreh

Population (2006)
  - Total: 134
- Time zone: UTC+3:30 (IRST)
  - Summer (DST): UTC+4:30 (IRDT)

Gavkach-e Olya (Persian: گاو كچ عليا, also Romanized as Gāvkach-e ‘Olyā; also known as Gāvgach-e ‘Olyā and Gāvkaj-e ‘Olyā) is a village in Khvor Khvoreh Rural District, Ziviyeh District, Saqqez County, Kurdistan Province, Iran. At the 2006 census, its population was 134, in 26 families. The village is populated by Kurds.
