= Khvordeh Luki =

Village in Kurdistan province, Iran

Khvordeh Luki Persian: خورده لوكي
- Village
- Location within Iran Location within Iran Kurdistan
- Coordinates: 36°10′12″N 46°19′57″E
- Country: Iran
- Province: Kurdistan
- County: Saqqez
- District: Sarshiv
- Rural District: Zu ol Faqr

Population (2016)
  - Total: 586
- Time zone: UTC+3:30 (IRST)

Khvordeh Luki (Persian: خورده لوكي) (Note: Also romanized as Khowrdeh Lūkī and Khvordeh Lūkī) is a village in Zu ol Faqr Rural District (Note: Formerly Sarshiv Rural District) of Sarshiv District, Saqqez County, Kurdistan province, Iran.

== Demographics ==
=== Ethnicity ===
The village is populated by Kurds.

=== Population ===
At the time of the 2006 National Census, the village's population was 541 in 105 households. The following census in 2011 counted 577 people in 158 households. The 2016 census measured the population of the village as 586 people in 137 households. It was the most populous village in its rural district.
