= Darreh Panbeh Dan, Ziviyeh =

Darreh Panbeh Dan دره پنبه دان
- Village
- Location within Iran
- Coordinates: 36°19′57″N 46°48′57″E
- Country: Iran
- Province: Kurdistan
- County: Saqqez
- Bakhsh: Ziviyeh
- Rural District: Gol Tappeh

Population (2006)
  - Total: 289
- Time zone: UTC+3:30 (IRST)
  - Summer (DST): UTC+4:30 (IRDT)

Darreh Panbeh Dan (Persian: دره پنبه دان, also Romanized as Darreh Panbeh Dān; also known as Darreh Pamdān) is a village in Gol Tappeh Rural District, Ziviyeh District, Saqqez County, Kurdistan Province, Iran. At the 2006 census, its population was 289, in 59 families. The village is populated by Kurds.
