= Mik, Iran =

Mik ميك
- Village
- Location within Iran
- Coordinates: 35°58′34″N 46°12′13″E
- Country: Iran
- Province: Kurdistan
- County: Saqqez
- Bakhsh: Sarshiv
- Rural District: Zu ol Faqr

Population (2006)
  - Total: 289
- Time zone: UTC+3:30 (IRST)
  - Summer (DST): UTC+4:30 (IRDT)

Mik (Persian: ميك, also Romanized as Mīk) is a village in Zu ol Faqr Rural District, Sarshiv District, Saqqez County, Kurdistan Province, Iran. At the 2006 census, its population was 289, in 52 families. The village is populated by Kurds.
