= Mahidar =

Mahidar or Mahi Dar (Persian: ماهيدر) may refer to:

- Mahidar, Baneh
- Mahidar-e Olya, Saqqez County
- Mahidar-e Sofla, Saqqez County
