= Khaneh Miran, Kurdistan =

Village in Kurdistan, Iran

Khaneh Miran خانه‌ميران
- Village
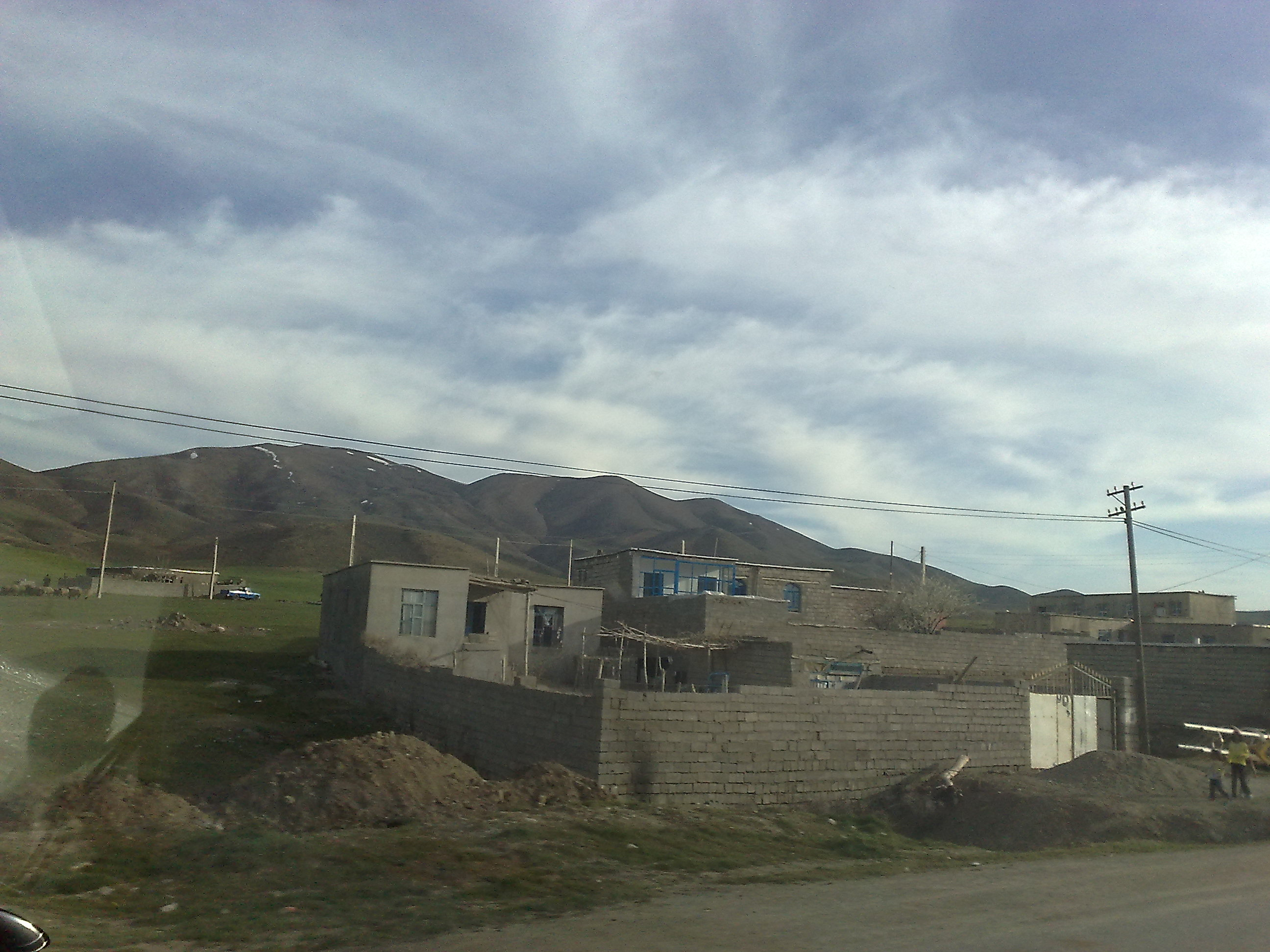

- Location within Iran
- Coordinates: 36°08′37″N 46°33′27″E
- Country: Iran
- Province: Kurdistan
- County: Saqqez
- Bakhsh: Ziviyeh
- Rural District: Emam

Population (2006)
  - Total: 312
- Time zone: UTC+3:30 (IRST)
  - Summer (DST): UTC+4:30 (IRDT)

Khaneh Miran (Persian: خانه‌ميران, also Romanized as Khāneh Mīrān; also known as Khān-e Amīrān) is a village in Emam Rural District, Ziviyeh District, Saqqez County, Kurdistan Province, Iran. At the 2006 census, its population was 312, in 68 families. The village is populated by Kurds.
