= Darreh Ziarat-e Sofla =

Darreh Ziarat-e Sofla دره زيارت سفلي
- Village
- Location within Iran
- Coordinates: 36°00′25″N 46°17′05″E
- Country: Iran
- Province: Kurdistan
- County: Saqqez
- Bakhsh: Sarshiv
- Rural District: Zu ol Faqr

Population (2006)
  - Total: 227
- Time zone: UTC+3:30 (IRST)
  - Summer (DST): UTC+4:30 (IRDT)

Darreh Ziarat-e Sofla (Persian: دره زيارت سفلي, also Romanized as Darreh Zīārat-e Soflá and Darreh-ye Zīārat-e Soflá; also known as Darreh-ye Zīārat-e Pā’īn, Darreh Zeyārat-e Pā’īn, Darreh Zīārat-e Pā’īn, and Darreh Zīyārat) is a village in Zu ol Faqr Rural District, Sarshiv District, Saqqez County, Kurdistan Province, Iran. At the 2006 census, its population was 227, in 41 families. The village is populated by Kurds.
