= Yazi Bolaghi =

Yazi Bolaghi (Persian: يازي بلاغي) may refer to:

- Yazi Bolaghi, Saqqez
- Yazi Bolaghi, Ziviyeh, Saqqez County
