= Khusheh Darreh =

Khusheh Darreh (Persian: خوشه دره) may refer to:

- Khusheh Darreh, Sarshiv
- Khusheh Darreh, Ziviyeh
