= Qaleh Jeqqeh, Saheb =

Qaleh Jeqqeh قلعه جقه
- Village
- Location within Iran
- Coordinates: 36°08′26″N 46°23′25″E
- Country: Iran
- Province: Kurdistan
- County: Saqqez
- Bakhsh: Ziviyeh
- Rural District: Saheb

Population (2006)
  - Total: 130
- Time zone: UTC+3:30 (IRST)
  - Summer (DST): UTC+4:30 (IRDT)

Qaleh Jeqqeh (Persian: قلعه جقه, also Romanized as Qal‘eh Jeqqeh) is a village in Saheb Rural District, Ziviyeh District, Saqqez County, Kurdistan Province, Iran. At the 2006 census, its population was 130, in 29 families. The village is populated by Kurds.
