= Qaleh Joqeh, Tilakuh =

Qaleh Joqeh قلعه جقه
- Village
- Location within Iran
- Coordinates: 36°07′21″N 46°41′24″E
- Country: Iran
- Province: Kurdistan
- County: Saqqez
- Bakhsh: Ziviyeh
- Rural District: Tilakuh

Population (2006)
  - Total: 282
- Time zone: UTC+3:30 (IRST)
  - Summer (DST): UTC+4:30 (IRDT)

Qaleh Joqeh (Persian: قلعه جقه, also Romanized as Qal‘eh Joqeh) is a village in Tilakuh Rural District, Ziviyeh District, Saqqez County, Kurdistan Province, Iran. At the 2006 census, its population was 282, in 58 families. The village is populated by Kurds.
