= Mahidar-e Sofla =

Mahidar-e Sofla ماهيدرسفلي
- Village
- Location within Iran
- Coordinates: 36°00′49″N 46°30′45″E
- Country: Iran
- Province: Kurdistan
- County: Saqqez
- Bakhsh: Ziviyeh
- Rural District: Khvor Khvoreh

Population (2006)
  - Total: 361
- Time zone: UTC+3:30 (IRST)
  - Summer (DST): UTC+4:30 (IRDT)

Mahidar-e Sofla (Persian: ماهيدرسفلي, also Romanized as Māhīdar-e Soflá; also known as Māhīdar, Māhī Dar-e Pā’īn, and Māhīdar-e Pā’īn) is a village in Khvor Khvoreh Rural District, Ziviyeh District, Saqqez County, Kurdistan Province, Iran. At the 2006 census, its population was 361, in 58 families. The village is populated by Kurds.
