= Darreh Panbeh Dan =

Darreh Panbeh Dan (Persian: دره پنبه دان) may refer to:

- Darreh Panbeh Dan, Saqqez
- Darreh Panbeh Dan, Ziviyeh, Saqqez County
