= Tilku =

Village in Kurdistan province, Iran

Tilku Persian: تيلكو
- Village
- Location within Iran Location within Iran Kurdistan
- Coordinates: 36°08′26″N 46°44′49″E
- Country: Iran
- Province: Kurdistan
- County: Saqqez
- District: Emam
- Rural District: Tilakuh

Population (2016)
  - Total: 939
- Time zone: UTC+3:30 (IRST)

Tilku (Persian: تيلكو) (Note: Also romanized as Tīlkū; also known as Īrān Khvāh, Īrān Shāh, Mīrānshāh, Mīrzā Īrānshāh, and Tīlkūh) is a village that is the capital of Tilakuh Rural District of Emam District, Saqqez County, Kurdistan province, Iran.

== Demographics ==
The village is populated by Kurds. At the time of the 2006 National Census, the village's population was 966 in 201 households, when it was in Ziviyeh District. The following census in 2011 counted 1,093 people in 262 households. The 2016 census measured the population of the village as 939 people in 258 households, by which time the rural district had been separated from the district in the formation of Emam District. It was the most populous village in its rural district.
