= Mazujedar =

Mazujedar or Mazujdar (Persian: مازوجدار) may refer to:

- Mazujdar, Saqqez
- Mazujedar, Sarshiv, Saqqez County
