= Mazujedar, Sarshiv =

Village in Kurdistan, Iran

Mazujedar مازوجدار
- Village
- Location within Iran
- Coordinates: 36°00′07″N 46°20′44″E
- Country: Iran
- Province: Kurdistan
- County: Saqqez
- Bakhsh: Sarshiv
- Rural District: Zu ol Faqr

Population (2006)
  - Total: 146
- Time zone: UTC+3:30 (IRST)
  - Summer (DST): UTC+4:30 (IRDT)

Mazujedar (Persian: مازوجدار, also Romanized as Mazūjedār; also known as Mazūjedār-e Sheykh ‘Abdollāh) is a village in Zu ol Faqr Rural District, Sarshiv District, Saqqez County, Kurdistan Province, Iran. At the 2006 census, its population was 146, in 28 families. The village is populated by Kurds.
