= Gol Tappeh, Kurdistan =

Village in Kurdistan province, Iran

Gol Tappeh Persian: گل تپه
- Village
- Location within Iran Location within Iran Kurdistan
- Coordinates: 36°21′45″N 46°40′09″E
- Country: Iran
- Province: Kurdistan
- County: Saqqez
- District: Ziviyeh
- Rural District: Gol Tappeh

Population (2016)
  - Total: 1,138
- Time zone: UTC+3:30 (IRST)

Gol Tappeh (Persian: گل تپه) is a village in, and the capital of, Gol Tappeh Rural District of Ziviyeh District, Saqqez County, Kurdistan province, Iran.

== Demographics ==
=== Ethnicity ===
The village is populated by Kurds.

=== Population ===
At the time of the 2006 National Census, the village's population was 1,011 in 214 households. The following census in 2011 counted 1,230 people in 279 households. The 2016 census measured the population of the village as 1,138 people in 313 households. It was the most populous village in its rural district.
