= Qamishleh, Ziviyeh =

Qamishleh قاميشله
- Village
- Location within Iran
- Coordinates: 35°57′56″N 46°24′17″E
- Country: Iran
- Province: Kurdistan
- County: Saqqez
- Bakhsh: Ziviyeh
- Rural District: Khvor Khvoreh

Population (2006)
  - Total: 142
- Time zone: UTC+3:30 (IRST)
  - Summer (DST): UTC+4:30 (IRDT)

Qamishleh (Persian: قاميشله, also Romanized as Qāmīshleh; also known as Qamishalān and Qamūshalān) is a village in Khvor Khvoreh Rural District, Ziviyeh District, Saqqez County, Kurdistan Province, Iran. At the 2006 census, its population was 142, in 24 families. The village is populated by Kurds.
