= Mahidar-e Olya =

Village in Kurdistan province, Iran

Mahidar-e Olya Persian: ماهيدر عليا
- Village
- Location within Iran Location within Iran Kurdistan
- Coordinates: 36°00′14″N 46°27′56″E
- Country: Iran
- Province: Kurdistan
- County: Saqqez
- District: Emam
- Rural District: Khvor Khvoreh

Population (2016)
  - Total: 513
- Time zone: UTC+3:30 (IRST)

Mahidar-e Olya (Persian: ماهيدرعليا) (Note: Also romanized as Māhīdar ‘Olyā and Māhīdar-e ‘Olyā) is a village in Khvor Khvoreh Rural District of Emam District, Saqqez County, Kurdistan province, Iran.

== Demographics ==
=== Ethnicity ===
The village is populated by Kurds.

=== Population ===
At the time of the 2006 National Census, the village's population was 703 in 118 households, when it was in Ziviyeh District. The following census in 2011 counted 624 people in 144 households. The 2016 census measured the population of the village as 513 people in 112 households, by which time the rural district had been separated from the district in the formation of Emam District. It was the most populous village in its rural district.
