= Darreh Ziarat-e Olya =

Darreh Ziarat-e Olya دره زيارت عليا
- Village
- Location within Iran
- Coordinates: 35°59′30″N 46°16′27″E
- Country: Iran
- Province: Kurdistan
- County: Saqqez
- Bakhsh: Sarshiv
- Rural District: Zu ol Faqr

Population (2006)
  - Total: 259
- Time zone: UTC+3:30 (IRST)
  - Summer (DST): UTC+4:30 (IRDT)

Darreh Ziarat-e Olya (Persian: دره زيارت عليا, also Romanized as Darreh Zīārat-e ‘Olyā and Darreh-ye Zīārat-e ‘Olyā; also known as Darreh-ye Zīārat-e Bālā, Darreh Zeyārat-e Bālā, Darreh Ziārat, and Darre Ziarat) is a village in Zu ol Faqr Rural District, Sarshiv District, Saqqez County, Kurdistan Province, Iran. At the 2006 census, its population was 259, in 51 families. The village is populated by Kurds.
