= Qaleh Gah-e Kurkur =

Qaleh Gah-e Kurkur قلعه گاه كوركور
- Village
- Location within Iran
- Coordinates: 36°09′32″N 46°40′17″E
- Country: Iran
- Province: Kurdistan
- County: Saqqez
- Bakhsh: Ziviyeh
- Rural District: Emam

Population (2006)
  - Total: 44
- Time zone: UTC+3:30 (IRST)
  - Summer (DST): UTC+4:30 (IRDT)

Qaleh Gah-e Kurkur (Persian: قلعه گاه كوركور, also Romanized as Qal‘eh Gāh-e Kūrkūr; also known as Qal‘eh Gah-e Karkar and Qal‘ehgāh-e Kūr Kūz) is a village in Emam Rural District, Ziviyeh District, Saqqez County, Kurdistan Province, Iran. At the 2006 census, its population was 44, in 12 families. The village is populated by Kurds.
