= Qaleh Kohneh, Saqqez =

Village in Kurdistan province, Iran

Qaleh Kohneh Persian: قلعه كهنه
- Village
- Location within Iran Location within Iran Kurdistan
- Coordinates: 36°17′41″N 46°30′38″E
- Country: Iran
- Province: Kurdistan
- County: Saqqez
- District: Ziviyeh
- Rural District: Saheb

Population (2016)
  - Total: 462
- Time zone: UTC+3:30 (IRST)

Qaleh Kohneh (Persian: قلعه كهنه) (Note: Also Romanized as Qal’eh Kohneh and Qal‘eh-ye Kohneh) is a village in Saheb Rural District of Ziviyeh District, Saqqez County, Kurdistan province, Iran.

== Demographics ==
=== Ethnicity ===
The village is populated by Kurds.

=== Population ===
At the time of the 2006 National Census, the village's population was 546 in 109 households. The following census in 2011 counted 480 people in 118 households. The 2016 census measured the population of the village as 462 people in 131 households. It was the most populous village in its rural district.
