= Yazi Bolaghi, Ziviyeh =

Yazi Bolaghi يازي بلاغي
- Village
- Location within Iran
- Coordinates: 36°21′15″N 46°35′01″E
- Country: Iran
- Province: Kurdistan
- County: Saqqez
- Bakhsh: Ziviyeh
- Rural District: Saheb

Population (2006)
  - Total: 68
- Time zone: UTC+3:30 (IRST)
  - Summer (DST): UTC+4:30 (IRDT)

Yazi Bolaghi (Persian: يازي بلاغي, also Romanized as Yāzī Bolāghī) is a village in Saheb Rural District, Ziviyeh District, Saqqez County, Kurdistan Province, Iran. At the 2006 census, its population was 68, in 17 families. The village is populated by Kurds.
