= Khvor Khvoreh, Saqqez =

Village in Kurdistan province, Iran

Khvor Khvoreh Persian: خورخوره
- Village
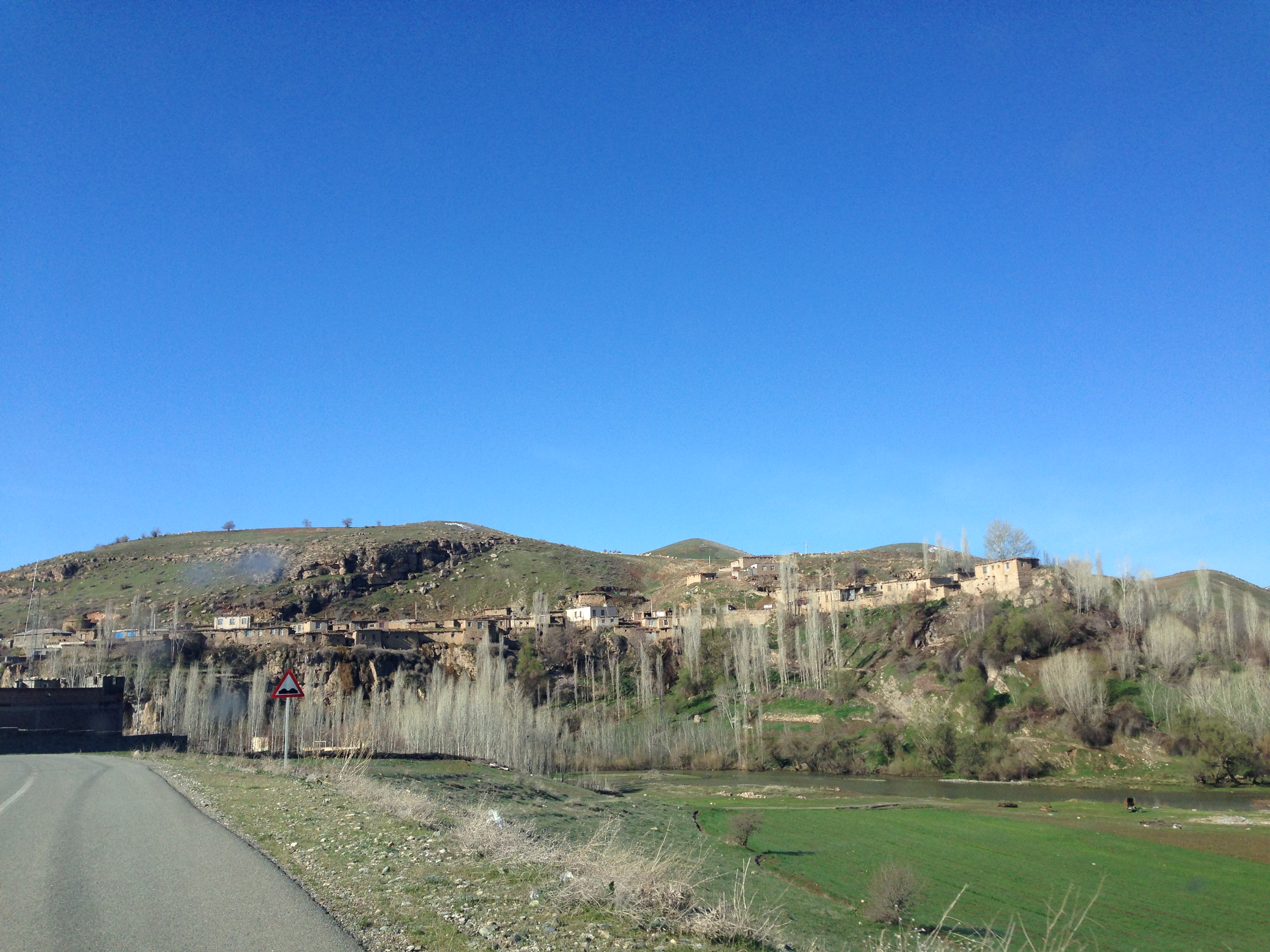

- Location within Iran Location within Iran Kurdistan
- Coordinates: 36°03′57″N 46°29′09″E
- Country: Iran
- Province: Kurdistan
- County: Saqqez
- District: Emam
- Rural District: Khvor Khvoreh

Population (2016)
  - Total: 255
- Time zone: UTC+3:30 (IRST)

Khvor Khvoreh (Persian: خورخوره) (Note: Also romanized as Khowr Khowreh) is a village in, and the capital of, Khvor Khvoreh Rural District of Emam District, Saqqez County, Kurdistan province, Iran.

The village is populated by Kurds. At the time of the 2006 National Census, the village's population was 263 in 56 households, when it was in Ziviyeh District. The following census in 2011 counted 329 people in 56 households. The 2016 census measured the population of the village as 255 people in 49 households, by which time the rural district had been separated from the district in the formation of Emam District.
