= Gavkach-e Sofla =

Gavkach-e Sofla گاو كچ سفلي
- Village
- Location within Iran
- Coordinates: 36°01′07″N 46°39′31″E
- Country: Iran
- Province: Kurdistan
- County: Saqqez
- Bakhsh: Ziviyeh
- Rural District: Khvor Khvoreh

Population (2006)
  - Total: 96
- Time zone: UTC+3:30 (IRST)
  - Summer (DST): UTC+4:30 (IRDT)

Gavkach-e Sofla (Persian: گاو كچ سفلي, also Romanized as Gāvkach-e Soflá; also known as Gāvkaj-e Pā’īn and Gāvkaj-e Soflá) is a village in Khvor Khvoreh Rural District, Ziviyeh District, Saqqez County, Kurdistan Province, Iran. At the 2006 census, its population was 96, in 14 families. The village is populated by Kurds.
