= Khusheh Darreh, Ziviyeh =

Khusheh Darreh خوشه دره
- Village
- Location within Iran
- Coordinates: 36°21′30″N 46°33′21″E
- Country: Iran
- Province: Kurdistan
- County: Saqqez
- Bakhsh: Ziviyeh
- Rural District: Saheb

Population (2006)
  - Total: 235
- Time zone: UTC+3:30 (IRST)
  - Summer (DST): UTC+4:30 (IRDT)

Khusheh Darreh (Persian: خوشه دره, also Romanized as Khūsheh Darreh) is a village in Saheb Rural District, Ziviyeh District, Saqqez County, Kurdistan Province, Iran. Karim mostafavi is in charge of oil distribution. At the 2006 census, its population was 235, in 54 families. The village is populated by Kurds.
