= Qamishleh, Sarshiv =

Qamishleh قاميشله
- Village
- Location within Iran
- Coordinates: 35°57′33″N 46°13′23″E
- Country: Iran
- Province: Kurdistan
- County: Saqqez
- Bakhsh: Sarshiv
- Rural District: Zu ol Faqr

Population (2006)
  - Total: 20
- Time zone: UTC+3:30 (IRST)
  - Summer (DST): UTC+4:30 (IRDT)

Qamishleh (Persian: قاميشله, also Romanized as Qāmīshleh) is a village in Zu ol Faqr Rural District, Sarshiv District, Saqqez County, Kurdistan Province, Iran. At the 2006 census, its population was 20, in 7 families. The village is populated by Kurds.
