= Qaleh Gah-e Sharif =

Qaleh Gah-e Sharif قلعه گاه شريف
- Village
- Location within Iran
- Coordinates: 36°11′34″N 46°48′15″E
- Country: Iran
- Province: Kurdistan
- County: Saqqez
- Bakhsh: Ziviyeh
- Rural District: Tilakuh

Population (2006)
  - Total: 219
- Time zone: UTC+3:30 (IRST)
  - Summer (DST): UTC+4:30 (IRDT)

Qaleh Gah-e Sharif (Persian: قلعه گاه شريف, also Romanized as Qal‘eh Gāh-e Sharīf and Qal‘ehgāh-e Sharīf) is a village in Tilakuh Rural District, Ziviyeh District, Saqqez County, Kurdistan Province, Iran. At the 2006 census, its population was 219, in 44 families. The village is populated by Kurds.
