= Inchekeh =

Inchekeh (Persian: اينچكه) may refer to:

- Inchekeh, Saqqez
- Inchekeh, Ziviyeh, Saqqez County
