= Qamishaleh =

Qamishaleh or Qami Sheleh or Qamishleh (Persian: قاميشله) may refer to:

- Qamishaleh, Marivan
- Qamishleh, Sarshiv, Saqqez County
- Qamishleh, Ziviyeh, Saqqez County
