= Darreh Ziarat =

Darreh Ziarat or Darreh-ye Ziarat or Darreh Zeyarat or Darreh Ziyarat (Persian: دره زيارت), also rendered as Darre Ziarat, may refer to:

- Darreh Ziarat-e Olya
- Darreh Ziarat-e Sofla
