= Degagah, Saqqez =

Village in Kurdistan province, Iran

Degagah Persian: دگاگاه
- Village
- Location within Iran Location within Iran Kurdistan
- Coordinates: 35°55′42″N 46°19′13″E
- Country: Iran
- Province: Kurdistan
- County: Saqqez
- District: Sarshiv
- Rural District: Chehel Cheshmeh-ye Gharbi

Population (2016)
  - Total: 286
- Time zone: UTC+3:30 (IRST)

Degagah (Persian: دگاگاه) (Note: Also romanized as Degāgāh and Dagāgāh; also known as Degāgā, Deh Āqā, Deh Gāgeh, Deh-i-Āgha, and Deh-i-Gāgeh) is a village in, and the capital of, Chehel Cheshmeh-ye Gharbi Rural District of Sarshiv District, Saqqez County, Kurdistan province, Iran.

== Demographics ==
=== Ethnicity ===
The village is populated by Kurds.

=== Population ===
At the time of the 2006 National Census, the village's population was 366 in 61 households. The following census in 2011 counted 376 people in 63 households. The 2016 census measured the population of the village as 286 people in 64 households.
