= Kakesiyaw =

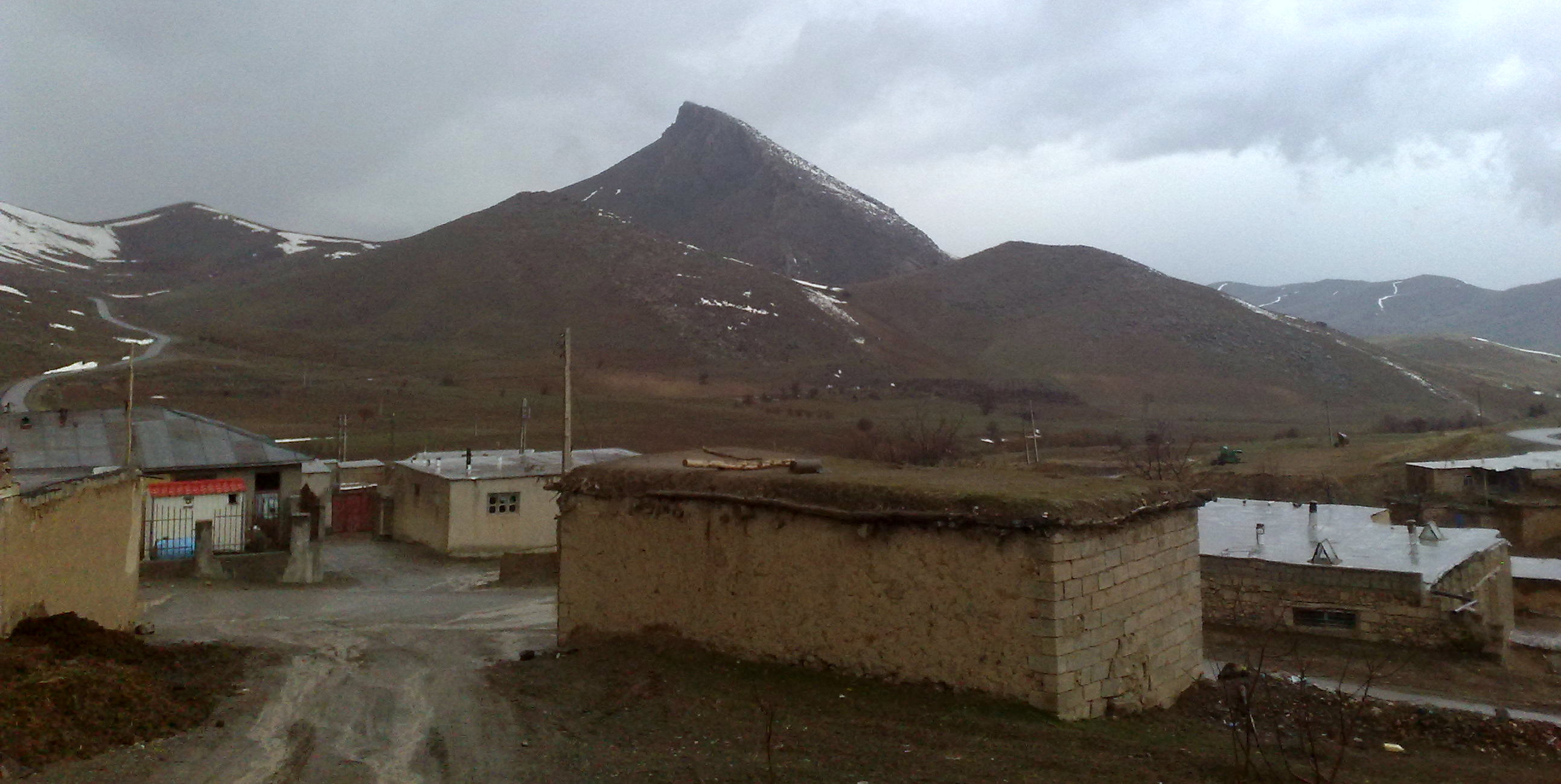

Kakesiyaw (Kurdish: Kakesiyaw, کاکەسیاو) is one of the villages of Ziviyeh District in the area of Saqqez County. According to a 2006 census the population of Kakesiyaw is 376 people in 75 families. The people of Kakesiyaw are Kurd and followers of Islam. In recent years there is great decline in the level of agriculture products in Kakesiyaw due to the migration of its people toward the great cities of Iran such as the capital city Tehran.
