= Gavkach =

Gavkach (Persian: گاو كچ), also rendered as Gavkaj or Gavgach, may refer to:

- Gavkach-e Olya
- Gavkach-e Sofla
