= Khusheh Darreh, Sarshiv =

Khusheh Darreh خوشه دره
- Village
- Location within Iran
- Coordinates: 35°54′18″N 46°22′26″E
- Country: Iran
- Province: Kurdistan
- County: Saqqez
- Bakhsh: Sarshiv
- Rural District: Chehel Cheshmeh-ye Gharbi

Population (2006)
  - Total: 249
- Time zone: UTC+3:30 (IRST)
  - Summer (DST): UTC+4:30 (IRDT)

Khusheh Darreh (Persian: خوشه دره, also Romanized as Khūsheh Darreh; also known as Khoosheh Dareh Khor Khoreh and Vasheh Darreh) is a village in Chehel Cheshmeh-ye Gharbi Rural District, Sarshiv District, Saqqez County, Kurdistan Province, Iran. At the 2006 census, its population was 249, in 46 families. The village is populated by Kurds.
