= Dalu =

Dalu or DALU may refer to:

== Places ==
=== China ===
- Dalu, Anhui (大路乡), Lingbi County, Anhui
- Dalu, Heilongjiang (大陆街道), in Nanshan District, Hegang, Heilongjiang
- Dalu (大路乡), a township, Tongshan County, Hubei
- Dalu Subdistrict, Anshan (大陆街道), in Tiexi District, Anshan, Liaoning
- Dalu, Guangxi (大菉镇), a town in Fangcheng District, Fangchenggang, Guangxi

=== Elsewhere ===
- Dalu, Meghalaya, India
- Dalu, Iran, a village in Kurdistan Province, Iran
- Dalu, a village in Sânger Commune, Mureș County, Romania

== People ==
- Dalu, Lugal (King) of the Ancient Sumerian City-State of Adab

== Other uses ==
- Directly affiliated local union
- Dalu (大路), the Chinese name for the 1934 film The Big Road

== See also ==
- Dalu Town (disambiguation), for all towns named Dalu Town
- 大陸 (disambiguation)
