= Mik =

Mik may refer to:

- Mik, Iran, a village in Kurdistan Province
- Josef Mik, Czech entomologist
- Mik Aoki, college baseball coach, currently head coach of Morehead State, formerly of Notre Dame, Boston College, and Columbia
- Mik, the pseudonym of Danish comics artist Henning Dahl Mikkelsen
