= Hasan Salaran =

Village in Kurdistan province, Iran

Hasan Salaran Persian: حسن سالاران
- Village
- Location within Iran Location within Iran Kurdistan
- Coordinates: 36°03′00″N 46°16′56″E
- Country: Iran
- Province: Kurdistan
- County: Saqqez
- District: Sarshiv
- Rural District: Zu ol Faqr

Population (2016)
  - Total: 172
- Time zone: UTC+3:30 (IRST)

Hasan Salaran (Persian: حسن سالاران) (Note: Also romanized as Ḩasan Sālārān) is a village in Zu ol Faqr Rural District (Note: Formerly Sarshiv Rural District) of Sarshiv District, Saqqez County, Kurdistan province, Iran, serving as capital of both the district and the rural district.

== Demographics ==
=== Ethnicity ===
The village is mostly populated by Kurds.

=== Population ===
As of the 2006 National Census, the village's population was 182 persons, in 35 households. The following census in 2011 counted 166 people and 38 households. The 2016 census measured the population of the village as 172 people in 44 households.
