= Khaneh Miran =

Khaneh Miran (Persian: خانه ميران) may refer to:

- Khaneh Miran, Kurdistan
- Khaneh Miran, Markazi
