= Ayyub =

Ayyub may refer to:

- Ayyub (name), a masculine given name notably borne by
  - Job in Islam
  - Abu Ayyub al-Ansari (as kunya/teknonym)
  - Najm ad-Din Ayyub, eponymous ancestor of the Ayyubid dynasty
- Ayyub (crater), an impact crater in the northern hemisphere of Saturn's moon Enceladus
- Ayyub, Iran, a village in Kurdistan Province, Iran

== See also ==
- Ayyubid dynasty, a Muslim dynasty of Kurdish origin
- Ayyub's Castle (from the Arabic Qalʿat ʾAyyūb), the original foundation of Calatayud, Province of Zaragoza, Aragón, Spain
