= Mainland (disambiguation) =

Mainland is a geomorphological/geopolitical term.

Mainland may also refer to:

- Mainland (band), an American rock band
- Mainland (cheese), cheese brand owned by Fonterra
- The Mainland (Father Ted), episode of the Channel 4 sitcom Father Ted
- Mainland, Western Australia, town in Western Australia
- Mainland, Newfoundland and Labrador, a village in Canada
- Mainland, Orkney, the main island of Orkney, Scotland
- Mainland, Shetland, the main island of Shetland, Scotland
- Mainland, Pennsylvania, an unincorporated community in the United States
- Mainland High School, Daytona Beach, Florida

== See also ==
- 大陸 (disambiguation)
