= Saheb, Iran =

City in Kurdistan province, Iran

Saheb Persian: صاحب Sorani Kurdish: ساحێو
- City
- Location within Iran Location within Iran Kurdistan
- Coordinates: 36°12′08″N 46°27′41″E
- Country: Iran
- Province: Kurdistan
- County: Saqqez
- District: Ziviyeh

Population (2016)
  - Total: 3,101
- Time zone: UTC+3:30 (IRST)

Saheb (Persian: صاحب, Sorani Kurdish: ساحێو) (Note: Also romanized as Şāḩeb and Sâheb; also known as Sāhib) is a city in, and the capital of, Ziviyeh District of Saqqez County, Kurdistan province, Iran. It also serves as the administrative center for Saheb Rural District. The previous capital of the district was the city of Santeh.

== Demographics ==
=== Ethnicity ===
The city is populated by Kurds.

=== Population ===
At the time of the 2006 National Census, the city's population was 1,489 in 344 households. The following census in 2011 counted 2,294 people in 514 households. The 2016 census measured the population of the city as 3,101 people in 800 households.
