= Mazujdar, Saqqez =

Mazujdar مازوجدار
- Village
- Location within Iran
- Coordinates: 36°10′26″N 46°06′48″E
- Country: Iran
- Province: Kurdistan
- County: Saqqez
- Bakhsh: Central
- Rural District: Mir Deh

Population (2006)
  - Total: 173
- Time zone: UTC+3:30 (IRST)
  - Summer (DST): UTC+4:30 (IRDT)

Mazujdar (Persian: مازوجدار, also Romanized as Māzūjdār; also known as Māzūj Darreh) is a village in Mir Deh Rural District, in the Central District of Saqqez County, Kurdistan Province, Iran. At the 2006 census, its population was 173, in 33 families. The village is populated by Kurds.
