= Santeh, Kurdistan =

City in Kurdistan province, Iran

Santeh Persian: سنته
- City
- Location within Iran Location within Iran Kurdistan
- Coordinates: 36°10′16″N 46°33′13″E
- Country: Iran
- Province: Kurdistan
- County: Saqqez
- District: Emam

Population (2016)
  - Total: 805
- Time zone: UTC+3:30 (IRST)

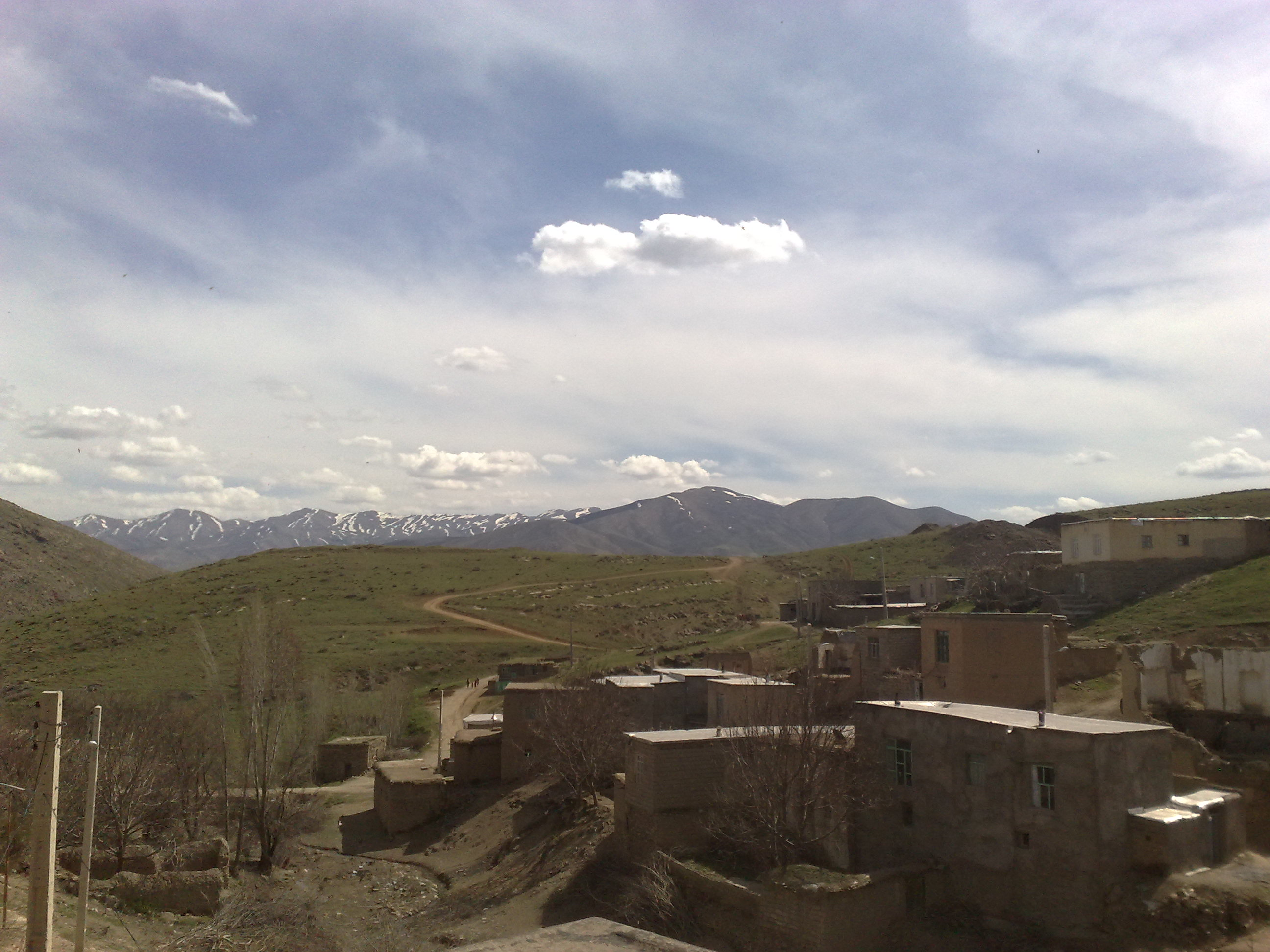
A view of Sunnete village in the Saqqez County of Kurdistan Province, Iran, showing the traditional stone architecture and tiered housing layout common in the region.

Santeh (Persian: سنته) is the capital city of Emam District of Saqqez County, Kurdistan province, Iran. It also serves as the administrative center for Emam Rural District. It was the capital of Ziviyeh District before its capital was transferred to the village of Saheb, now a city.

== Demographics ==
The city is populated by Kurds. At the time of the 2006 National Census, Santeh's population was 860 in 199 households, when it was a village in Emam Rural District of Ziviyeh District. The following census in 2011 counted 945 people in 236 households. The 2016 census measured the population of the village as 805 people in 231 households, by which time the rural district had been separated from the district in the formation of Emam District. It was the most populous village in its rural district.

In 2019, Santeh was elevated to the status of a city.
