= Darreh Panbeh Dan, Saqqez =

Darreh Panbeh Dan دره پنبه دان
- Village
- Location within Iran
- Coordinates: 36°16′41″N 46°19′25″E
- Country: Iran
- Province: Kurdistan
- County: Saqqez
- Bakhsh: Central
- Rural District: Sara

Population (2006)
  - Total: 111
- Time zone: UTC+3:30 (IRST)
  - Summer (DST): UTC+4:30 (IRDT)

Darreh Panbeh Dan (Persian: دره پنبه دان, also Romanized as Darreh Panbeh Dān; also known as Darreh Panbeh Dāneh) is a village in Sara Rural District, in the Central District of Saqqez County, Kurdistan Province, Iran. At the 2006 census, its population was 111, in 23 families. The village is populated by Kurds.
