= Khvor Khvoreh Rural District =

Khvor Khvoreh Rural District (Persian: دهستان خورخوره) may refer to:

- Khvor Khvoreh Rural District (Bijar County)
- Khvor Khvoreh Rural District (Saqqez County)
