= Qalehgah-e Gudarz =

Qalehgah-e Gudarz قلعه‌گاه گودرز
- Village
- Location within Iran
- Coordinates: 36°22′21″N 46°28′31″E
- Country: Iran
- Province: Kurdistan
- County: Saqqez
- Bakhsh: Central
- Rural District: Sara

Population (2006)
  - Total: 426
- Time zone: UTC+3:30 (IRST)
  - Summer (DST): UTC+4:30 (IRDT)

Qalehgah-e Gudarz (Persian: قلعه‌گاه گودرز, also romanized as Qal‘ehgāh-e Gūdarz; also known as Qal‘ehgāh) is a village in Sara Rural District, in the Central District of Saqqez County, Kurdistan Province, Iran. At the 2006 census its population was 426, in 86 families. The village is populated by Kurds.
