= Inchekeh, Saqqez =

Inchekeh اينچكه
- Village
- Location within Iran
- Coordinates: 36°18′41″N 45°59′00″E
- Country: Iran
- Province: Kurdistan
- County: Saqqez
- Bakhsh: Central
- Rural District: Torjan

Population (2006)
  - Total: 21
- Time zone: UTC+3:30 (IRST)
  - Summer (DST): UTC+4:30 (IRDT)

Inchekeh (Persian: اينچكه, also Romanized as Īnchekeh) is a village in Torjan Rural District, in the Central District of Saqqez County, Kurdistan Province, Iran. At the 2006 census, its population was 21, in 4 families. The village is populated by Kurds.
