= Yazi Bolaghi, Saqqez =

Yazi Bolaghi يازي بلاغي
- Village
- Location within Iran
- Coordinates: 36°19′54″N 46°09′54″E
- Country: Iran
- Province: Kurdistan
- County: Saqqez
- Bakhsh: Central
- Rural District: Sara

Population (2006)
  - Total: 569
- Time zone: UTC+3:30 (IRST)
  - Summer (DST): UTC+4:30 (IRDT)

Yazi Bolaghi (Persian: يازي بلاغي, also Romanized as Yāzī Bolāghī; also known as Yārī Kandī, Yazi Bulāghī, and Yāzi Bulāq) is a village in Sara Rural District, in the Central District of Saqqez County, Kurdistan Province, Iran. As of the 2006 census, its population was 569, in 94 families. The village is populated by Kurds.
