= 大陸 =

大陸, meaning "continent" or "mainland", may refer to:

- Darren Wang (王大陸; born 1991), Taiwanese actor
- Hsiao Ta-lu (蕭大陸; born 1955), Taiwanese actor who cast in the television series Feng Shui Family
- Mainland (大陸), the term used in official contexts to refer to Mainland China as opposed to Taiwan
- Tairiku Shobō (大陸書房), Japanese publishing company which Natsuki Okamoto' s videos published from

== See also ==
- Dalu (disambiguation)
- Mainland (disambiguation)
