= Qaleh Gah, Kamyaran =

Qaleh Gah قلعه گاه
- Village
- Location within Iran
- Coordinates: 35°02′11″N 47°19′03″E
- Country: Iran
- Province: Kurdistan
- County: Kamyaran
- Bakhsh: Muchesh
- Rural District: Amirabad

Population (2006)
  - Total: 302
- Time zone: UTC+3:30 (IRST)
  - Summer (DST): UTC+4:30 (IRDT)

Qaleh Gah (Persian: قلعه گاه, also Romanized as Qal‘eh Gāh; also known as Qal‘eh Ghah) is a village in Amirabad Rural District, Muchesh District, Kamyaran County, Kurdistan Province, Iran. At the 2006 census, its population was 302, in 59 families. The village is populated by Kurds.
