= Qaleh Gah, Dehgolan =

Qaleh Gah قلعه گاه
- Village
- Location within Iran
- Coordinates: 35°30′22″N 47°25′43″E
- Country: Iran
- Province: Kurdistan
- County: Dehgolan
- Bakhsh: Central
- Rural District: Yeylan-e Shomali

Population (2006)
  - Total: 114
- Time zone: UTC+3:30 (IRST)
  - Summer (DST): UTC+4:30 (IRDT)

Qaleh Gah (Persian: قلعه گاه, also Romanized as Qal‘eh Gāh; also known as Kulāwa) is a village in Yeylan-e Shomali Rural District, in the Central District of Dehgolan County, Kurdistan Province, Iran. At the 2006 census, its population was 114, in 20 families. The village is populated by Kurds.
