= Tilkuh, Kamyaran =

Tilkuh تيلكوه
- Village
- Location within Iran
- Coordinates: 34°57′15″N 46°39′51″E
- Country: Iran
- Province: Kurdistan
- County: Kamyaran
- Bakhsh: Central
- Rural District: Zhavehrud

Population (2006)
  - Total: 856
- Time zone: UTC+3:30 (IRST)
  - Summer (DST): UTC+4:30 (IRDT)

Tilkuh (Persian: تيلكوه, also Romanized as Tīlkūh; also known as Tīleh Kūh and Tīlkū) is a village in Zhavehrud Rural District, in the Central District of Kamyaran County, Kurdistan Province, Iran. At the 2006 census, its population was 856, in 180 families. The village is populated by Kurds.
