= Qaleh Jeqeh-ye Sofla =

Qaleh Jeqeh-ye Sofla قلعه جقه سفلي
- Village
- Location within Iran
- Coordinates: 35°50′39″N 47°06′42″E
- Country: Iran
- Province: Kurdistan
- County: Divandarreh
- Bakhsh: Central
- Rural District: Howmeh

Population (2006)
  - Total: 110
- Time zone: UTC+3:30 (IRST)
  - Summer (DST): UTC+4:30 (IRDT)

Qaleh Jeqeh-ye Sofla (Persian: قلعه جقه سفلي, also Romanized as Qal‘eh Jeqeh-ye Soflá; also known as Ghal’eh Chegheh Hosein Ābād, Qālā Jogeh, Qal‘eh Jeqeh, Qal’eh Joqeh, Qal‘eh Joqeh, and Qal‘eh Jūqeh) is a village in Howmeh Rural District, in the Central District of Divandarreh County, Kurdistan Province, Iran. At the 2006 census, its population was 110, in 22 families. The village is populated by Kurds.
