= Qaleh Jugheh =

Village in West Azerbaijan, Iran

Qaleh Jugheh قلعه جوغه
- Village
- Location within Iran
- Coordinates: 36°41′30″N 46°00′33″E
- Country: Iran
- Province: West Azerbaijan
- County: Mahabad
- Bakhsh: Central
- Rural District: Akhtachi-ye Gharbi

Population (2006)
  - Total: 162
- Time zone: UTC+3:30 (IRST)
  - Summer (DST): UTC+4:30 (IRDT)

Qaleh Jugheh (Persian: قلعه جوغه, also Romanized as Qal‘eh Jūgheh; also known as Qal‘eh Jūqeh) is a village in Akhtachi-ye Gharbi Rural District, in the Central District of Mahabad County, West Azerbaijan Province, Iran. At the 2006 census, its population was 162, in 33 families.
