= Khvor Khvoreh, Bukan =

Khvor Khvoreh خورخوره
- Village
- Location within Iran
- Coordinates: 36°17′42″N 45°48′03″E
- Country: Iran
- Province: West Azerbaijan
- County: Bukan
- Bakhsh: Central
- Rural District: Il Gavark

Population (2006)
  - Total: 440
- Time zone: UTC+3:30 (IRST)
  - Summer (DST): UTC+4:30 (IRDT)

Khvor Khvoreh (Persian: خورخوره, also Romanized as Khowr Khowreh) is a village in Il Gavark Rural District, in the Central District of Bukan County, West Azerbaijan Province, Iran. At the 2006 census, its population was 440, in 61 families.
