= Qaleh Gah, Ravansar =

Qaleh Gah قلعه گاه
- Village
- Location within Iran
- Coordinates: 34°54′36″N 46°28′39″E
- Country: Iran
- Province: Kermanshah
- County: Ravansar
- Bakhsh: Shahu
- Rural District: Mansur-e Aqai

Population (2006)
  - Total: 217
- Time zone: UTC+3:30 (IRST)
  - Summer (DST): UTC+4:30 (IRDT)

Qaleh Gah (Persian: قلعه گاه, also Romanized as Qal‘eh Gāh) is a village in Mansur-e Aqai Rural District, Shahu District, Ravansar County, Kermanshah Province, Iran. At the 2006 census, its population was 217, in 43 families.
