= Qaleh Joqeh, Divandarreh =

Qaleh Joqeh قلعه جقه
- Village
- Location within Iran
- Coordinates: 36°10′49″N 46°53′41″E
- Country: Iran
- Province: Kurdistan
- County: Divandarreh
- Bakhsh: Karaftu
- Rural District: Obatu

Population (2006)
  - Total: 497
- Time zone: UTC+3:30 (IRST)
  - Summer (DST): UTC+4:30 (IRDT)

Qaleh Joqeh (Persian: قلعه جقه, also Romanized as Qal‘eh Joqeh; also known as Qal‘eh Jūqeh) is a village in Obatu Rural District, Karaftu District, Divandarreh County, Kurdistan Province, Iran. At the 2006 census, its population was 497, in 108 families. The village is populated by Kurds.
