= Qaleh Juqeh =

Qaleh Juqeh قلعه جوقه
- Village
- Location within Iran
- Coordinates: 36°32′17″N 45°45′36″E
- Country: Iran
- Province: West Azerbaijan
- County: Mahabad
- Bakhsh: Khalifan
- Rural District: Kani Bazar

Population (2006)
  - Total: 235
- Time zone: UTC+3:30 (IRST)
  - Summer (DST): UTC+4:30 (IRDT)

Qaleh Juqeh (Persian: قلعه جوقه, also Romanized as Qal‘eh Jūqeh; also known as Qal‘eh Jūgheh) is a village in Kani Bazar Rural District, Khalifan District, Mahabad County, West Azerbaijan Province, Iran. At the 2006 census, its population was 235, in 33 families.
