= Qaleh Gah, Divandarreh =

Qaleh Gah قلعه گاه
- Village
- Location within Iran
- Coordinates: 35°51′42″N 46°51′01″E
- Country: Iran
- Province: Kurdistan
- County: Divandarreh
- Bakhsh: Saral
- Rural District: Saral

Population (2006)
  - Total: 180
- Time zone: UTC+3:30 (IRST)
  - Summer (DST): UTC+4:30 (IRDT)

Qaleh Gah (Persian: قلعه گاه, also Romanized as Qal‘eh Gāh) is a village in Saral Rural District, Saral District, Divandarreh County, Kurdistan Province, Iran. At the 2006 census, its population was 180, in 37 families. The village is populated by Kurds.
