= Qaleh Gah, Sarvabad =

Qaleh Gah قلعه گاه
- Village
- Location within Iran
- Coordinates: 35°21′37″N 46°17′34″E
- Country: Iran
- Province: Kurdistan
- County: Sarvabad
- Bakhsh: Central
- Rural District: Kusalan

Population (2006)
  - Total: 882
- Time zone: UTC+3:30 (IRST)
  - Summer (DST): UTC+4:30 (IRDT)

Qaleh Gah (Persian: قلعه گاه, also Romanized as Qal'eh Gāh; also known as Qal'eh Qāh) is a village in Kusalan Rural District, in the Central District of Sarvabad County, Kurdistan Province, Iran. At the 2006 census, its population was 882, in 209 families. The village is populated by Kurds.
