= Emam District =

District in Kurdistan province, Iran

Emam District Persian: بخش امام
- District
- Location within Iran Location within Iran Kurdistan
- Coordinates: 36°03′01″N 46°36′59″E
- Country: Iran
- Province: Kurdistan
- County: Saqqez
- Capital: Santeh

Population (2016)
  - Total: 12,946
- Time zone: UTC+3:30 (IRST)

Emam District (Persian: بخش امام) is in Saqqez County, Kurdistan province, Iran. Its capital is the city of Santeh.

== History ==
After the 2011 National Census, Emam, Khvor Khvoreh, and Tilakuh Rural Districts were separated from Ziviyeh District in the formation of Emam District. In 2019, the village of Santeh was elevated to the status of a city.

== Demographics ==
=== Population ===
At the time of the 2016 census, the district's population was 12,946 inhabitants in 3,358 households.

Emam District Population
Administrative Divisions	2016
Emam RD	3,658
Khvor Khvoreh RD	5,217
Tilakuh RD	4,071
Santeh (city) (Note: Became a city after the 2016 census)	
Total	12,946
RD = Rural District
