= Chehel Cheshmeh-ye Gharbi Rural District =

Rural district in Kurdistan province, Iran

Chehel Cheshmeh-ye Gharbi Rural District Persian: دهستان چهل چشمه غربي
- Rural District
- Location within Iran Location within Iran Kurdistan
- Coordinates: 35°52′43″N 46°18′28″E
- Country: Iran
- Province: Kurdistan
- County: Saqqez
- District: Sarshiv
- Capital: Degagah

Population (2016)
  - Total: 2,057
- Time zone: UTC+3:30 (IRST)

Chehel Cheshmeh-ye Gharbi Rural District (Persian: دهستان چهل چشمه غربي) is in Sarshiv District of Saqqez County, Kurdistan province, Iran. Its capital is the village of Degagah.

== Demographics ==
=== Population ===
At the time of the 2006 National Census, the rural district's population was 2,624 in 468 households. There were 2,631 inhabitants in 499 households at the following census of 2011. The 2016 census measured the population of the rural district as 2,057 in 503 households. The most populous of its 15 villages was Bastam, with 538 people.
