= Tilakuh Rural District =

Rural district in Kurdistan province, Iran

Tilakuh Rural District Persian: دهستان تيلكوه
- Rural District
- Location within Iran Location within Iran Kurdistan
- Coordinates: 36°07′23″N 46°42′52″E
- Country: Iran
- Province: Kurdistan
- County: Saqqez
- District: Emam
- Capital: Tilku

Population (2016)
  - Total: 4,071
- Time zone: UTC+3:30 (IRST)

Tilakuh Rural District (Persian: دهستان تيلكوه) is in Emam District of Saqqez County, Kurdistan province, Iran. Its capital is the village of Tilku.

== Demographics ==
=== Population ===
At the time of the 2006 National Census, the rural district's population (as a part of Ziviyeh District) was 5,318 in 1,057 households. There were 4,950 inhabitants in 1,140 households at the following census of 2011.v The 2016 census measured the population of the rural district as 4,071 in 1,064 households, by which time the rural district had been separated from the district in the formation of Emam District. The most populous of its 29 villages was Tilku, with 939 people.
