= Emam Rural District =

Rural district in Kurdistan province, Iran

Emam Rural District Persian: دهستان امام
- Rural District
- Location within Iran Location within Iran Kurdistan
- Coordinates: 36°10′03″N 46°32′26″E
- Country: Iran
- Province: Kurdistan
- County: Saqqez
- District: Emam
- Capital: Santeh

Population (2016)
  - Total: 3,658
- Time zone: UTC+3:30 (IRST)

Emam Rural District (Persian: دهستان امام) is in Emam District of Saqqez County, Kurdistan province, Iran. It is administered from the city of Santeh.

== Demographics ==
=== Population ===
At the time of the 2006 National Census, the rural district's population (as a part of Ziviyeh District) was 4,697 in 1,005 households. There were 4,075 inhabitants in 1,009 households at the following census of 2011. The 2016 census measured the population of the rural district as 3,658 in 1,019 households, by which time the rural district had been separated from the district in the formation of Emam District. The most populous of its 24 villages was Santeh (now a city), with 805 people.
