= Khvor Khvoreh Rural District (Saqqez County) =

Rural district in Kurdistan province, Iran

Khvor Khvoreh Rural District Persian: دهستان خورخوره
- Rural District
- Location within Iran Location within Iran Kurdistan
- Coordinates: 35°58′22″N 46°33′36″E
- Country: Iran
- Province: Kurdistan
- County: Saqqez
- District: Emam
- Capital: Khvor Khvoreh

Population (2016)
  - Total: 5,217
- Time zone: UTC+3:30 (IRST)

Khvor Khvoreh Rural District (Persian: دهستان خورخوره) is in Emam District of Saqqez County, Kurdistan province, Iran. Its capital is the village of Khvor Khvoreh.

== Demographics ==
=== Population ===
At the time of the 2006 National Census, the rural district's population (as a part of Ziviyeh District) was 7,154 in 1,296 households. There were 6,074 inhabitants in 1,308 households at the following census of 2011. The 2016 census measured the population of the rural district as 5,217 in 1,275 households, by which time the rural district had been separated from the district in the formation of Emam District. The most populous of its 30 villages was Mahidar-e Olya, with 513 people.
