= Saheb Rural District =

Rural district in Kurdistan province, Iran

Saheb Rural District Persian: دهستان صاحب
- Rural District
- Location within Iran Location within Iran Kurdistan
- Coordinates: 36°14′33″N 46°29′16″E
- Country: Iran
- Province: Kurdistan
- County: Saqqez
- District: Ziviyeh
- Capital: Saheb

Population (2016)
  - Total: 3,956
- Time zone: UTC+3:30 (IRST)

Saheb Rural District (Persian: دهستان صاحب) is in Ziviyeh District of Saqqez County, Kurdistan province, Iran. It is administered from the city of Saheb.

== Demographics ==
=== Population ===
At the time of the 2006 National Census, the rural district's population was 4,845 in 995 households. There were 4,158 inhabitants in 1,012 households at the following census of 2011. The 2016 census measured the population of the rural district as 3,956 in 1,093 households. The most populous of its 25 villages was Qaleh Kohneh, with 462 people.
