= Gol Tappeh Rural District (Saqqez County) =

Rural district in Kurdistan province, Iran

Gol Tappeh Rural District Persian: دهستان گل تپه
- Rural District
- Location within Iran Location within Iran Kurdistan
- Coordinates: 36°20′04″N 46°43′30″E
- Country: Iran
- Province: Kurdistan
- County: Saqqez
- District: Ziviyeh
- Capital: Gol Tappeh

Population (2016)
  - Total: 6,412
- Time zone: UTC+3:30 (IRST)

Gol Tappeh Rural District (Persian: دهستان گل تپه) is in Ziviyeh District of Saqqez County, Kurdistan province, Iran. Its capital is the village of Gol Tappeh.

== Demographics ==
=== Population ===
At the time of the 2006 National Census, the rural district's population was 7,409 in 1,533 households. There were 6,607 inhabitants in 1,576 households at the following census of 2011. The 2016 census measured the population of the rural district as 6,412 in 1,712 households. The most populous of its 34 villages was Gol Tappeh, with 1,138 people.
