= Zu ol Faqr Rural District =

Rural district in Kurdistan province, Iran

Zu ol Faqr Rural District Persian: دهستان ذوالفقار
- Rural District
- Location within Iran Location within Iran Kurdistan
- Coordinates: 36°02′01″N 46°15′14″E
- Country: Iran
- Province: Kurdistan
- County: Saqqez
- District: Sarshiv
- Capital: Hasan Salaran

Population (2016)
  - Total: 6,418
- Time zone: UTC+3:30 (IRST)

Zu ol Faqr Rural District (Persian: دهستان ذوالفقار), (Note: Formerly Sarshiv Rural District (دهستان سرشیو)) is in Sarshiv District of Saqqez County, Kurdistan province, Iran. Its capital is the village of Hasan Salaran.

== Demographics ==
=== Population ===
At the time of the 2006 National Census, the rural district's population was 7,715 in 1,497 households. There were 7,510 inhabitants in 1,701 households at the following census of 2011. The 2016 census measured the population of the rural district as 6,418 in 1,640 households. The most populous of its 43 villages was Khvordeh Luki, with 586 people.
