= Sarshiv District (Saqqez County) =

District in Kurdistan province, Iran

Sarshiv District Persian: بخش سرشیو
- District
- Location within Iran Location within Iran Kurdistan
- Coordinates: 35°59′59″N 46°17′45″E
- Country: Iran
- Province: Kurdistan
- County: Saqqez
- Capital: Hasan Salaran

Population (2016)
  - Total: 8,475
- Time zone: UTC+3:30 (IRST)

Sarshiv District (Persian: بخش سرشیو) is in Saqqez County, Kurdistan province, Iran. Its capital is the village of Hasan Salaran.

== Demographics ==
=== Population ===
At the time of the 2006 National Census, the district's population was 10,339 in 1,965 households. The following census in 2011 counted 10,141 people in 2,200 households. The 2016 census measured the population of the district as 8,475 inhabitants in 2,143 households.

=== Administrative divisions ===
Sarshiv District Population
Administrative Divisions	2006	2011	2016
Chehel Cheshmeh-ye Gharbi RD	2,624	2,631	2,057
Zu ol Faqr RD (Note: Formerly Sarshiv Rural District)	7,715	7,510	6,418
Total	10,339	10,141	8,475
RD = Rural District
