= Ziviyeh District =

District in Kurdistan province, Iran

Ziviyeh District Persian: بخش زیویه
- District
- Location within Iran Location within Iran Kurdistan
- Coordinates: 36°16′40″N 46°37′33″E
- Country: Iran
- Province: Kurdistan
- County: Saqqez
- Capital: Saheb

Population (2016)
  - Total: 13,469
- Time zone: UTC+3:30 (IRST)

Ziviyeh District (Persian: بخش زیویه) is in Saqqez County, Kurdistan province, Iran. Its capital is the city of Saheb. The previous capital of the district was the city of Santeh.

== History ==
After the 2011 National Census, Emam Rural District, Khvor Khvoreh Rural District, and Tilakuh Rural District were separated from the district in the formation of Emam District.

== Demographics ==
=== Population ===
At the time of the 2006 census, the district's population was 30,912 in 6,230 households. The following census in 2011 counted 28,158 people in 6,559 households. The 2016 census measured the population of the district as 13,469 inhabitants in 3,605 households.

=== Administrative divisions ===
Ziviyeh District Population
Administrative Divisions	2006	2011	2016
Emam RD (Note: Transferred to Emam District)	4,697	4,075	
Gol Tappeh RD	7,409	6,607	6,412
Khvor Khvoreh RD	7,154	6,074	
Saheb RD	4,845	4,158	3,956
Tilakuh RD	5,318	4,950	
Saheb (city)	1,489	2,294	3,101
Total	30,912	28,158	13,469
RD = Rural District

== See also ==
- Ziwiyeh castle
- Ziwiye hoard
