= Saqqez County =

County in Kurdistan province, Iran

Saqqez County Persian: شهرستان سقز
- County
- Location of Saqqez County in Kurdistan province

- Location of Kurdistan province in Iran
- Coordinates: 36°07′N 46°22′E
- Country: Iran
- Province: Kurdistan
- Capital: Saqqez
- Districts: Central, Emam, Sarshiv, Ziviyeh

Population (2016)
  - Total: 226,451
- Time zone: UTC+3:30 (IRST)

Saqqez County (Persian: شهرستان سقز) (Note: Also romanized as Šaharstān-e Saqqez; Sorani Kurdish: سه‌قز) is in Kurdistan province, Iran. Its capital is the city of Saqqez.

== History ==
After the 2011 National Census, Emam, Khvor Khvoreh, and Tilakuh Rural Districts were separated from Ziviyeh District in the formation of Emam District. In 2019, the village of Santeh was elevated to the status of a city.

== Demographics ==
=== Population ===
At the time of the 2006 census, the county's population was 205,250 in 45,909 households. The following census in 2011 counted 210,820 people in 53,939 households. The 2016 census measured the population of the county as 226,451 in 64,384 households. The county is largely populated by ethnic Kurds.

=== Administrative divisions ===
Saqqez County's population history and administrative structure over three consecutive censuses are shown in the following table.

Saqqez County Population
Administrative Divisions	2006	2011	2016
Central District	163,999	172,521	191,561
Mir Deh RD	6,322	5,266	4,774
Sara RD	12,408	11,268	11,842
Tamugheh RD	8,890	12,009	5,748
Torjan RD	5,030	4,240	3,939
Saqqez (city)	131,349	139,738	165,258
Emam District			12,946
Emam RD			3,658
Khvor Khvoreh RD			5,217
Tilakuh RD			4,071
Santeh (city) (Note: Became a city after the 2016 census)			
Sarshiv District	10,339	10,141	8,475
Chehel Cheshmeh-ye Gharbi RD	2,624	2,631	2,057
Zu ol Faqr RD (Note: Formerly Sarshiv Rural District)	7,715	7,510	6,418
Ziviyeh District	30,912	28,158	13,469
Emam RD	4,697	4,075	
Gol Tappeh RD	7,409	6,607	6,412
Khvor Khvoreh RD	7,154	6,074	
Saheb RD	4,845	4,158	3,956
Tilakuh RD	5,318	4,950	
Saheb (city)	1,489	2,294	3,101
Total	205,250	210,820	226,451
RD = Rural District

== See also ==
Media related to Saqqez County at Wikimedia Commons
