= Karabakh (disambiguation) =

Karabakh (Azerbaijani: Qarabağ; Armenian: Ղարաբաղ Gharabagh) is a geographic region in present-day eastern Armenia and southwestern Azerbaijan, extending from the highlands of the Lesser Caucasus down to the lowlands between the rivers Kura and Aras

Karabakh or variants Qarabagh, Gharabagh, Karabağ, Qarabağ, Qara Bagh may also refer to:

== Places ==
- Nagorno-Karabakh, meaning "Mountainous Karabakh", a territory in Azerbaijan, was governed by ethnic Armenians under the breakaway Republic of Artsakh from 1994 to 2023
- Karabakh Steppe, or Lowland Karabakh (see Karabakh)
- Karabakh Economic Region, one of the economic regions of Azerbaijan
- Zangezur, the western highlands of Karabakh and the only part of Karabakh which lies within Armenia, roughly corresponding to the Province of Syunik

=== Afghanistan ===
- Qarabagh District, Ghazni
- Qarabagh District, Kabul

=== Azerbaijan ===
- Qarabağ, Agdam
- Qarabağ, Fuzuli
- Qarabağlar (disambiguation)
  - Qarabağlar, Goychay
  - Qarabağlar, Nakhchivan
  - Qarabağlar, Samukh
  - Qarabağlar, Shamkir
- Qarabağlı (disambiguation)
  - Qarabağlı, Agsu
  - Qarabağlı, Khachmaz
  - Qarabağlı, Salyan
  - Qarabağlı, Samukh
  - Qarabağlı, Şabran
- Qarabağlılar, Tovuz

=== Iran ===
- Qarah Bagh, North Khorasan
- Qarah Bagh, Qazvin
- Qarah Bagh, Razavi Khorasan
- Qarah Bagh, West Azerbaijan
- Qarah Bagh Rural District

=== Turkey ===
- Büyükkarabağ, Bolvadin
- Derekarabağ, Bolvadin
- Karabağ, İncirliova
- Karabağlar, Izmir
- Karabağlar, Karacasu
- Yenikarabağ, Sultandağı

== Political entities ==
- Karabakh Khanate (1747–1805)
- Melikdoms of Karabakh (1603-1822), also known as "Khamsa", Armenian feudal entities that existed on the territory of modern Nagorno-Karabakh
- Nagorno-Karabakh Autonomous Oblast (1923–1991), an autonomous oblast within the borders of the Azerbaijan Soviet Socialist Republic, Soviet Union (USSR), mostly inhabited by ethnic Armenians
- Nagorno-Karabakh Republic (NKR; 1991–2023), later Republic of Artsakh, former breakaway state in the South Caucasus internationally recognized as a part of Azerbaijan
- Province of Karabakh, within the Safavid Empire of Iran
- Upper Karabakh Economic Region (Azerbaijani: Yuxarı Qarabağ), one of the economic regions of Azerbaijan

== Sports ==
- FC Qarabag Khankendi, an Azerbaijani football club based in Baku
- Qarabağ FK, an Azerbaijani football club

== Other uses ==
- Karabakh dialect, an ancient Armenian dialect
- Karabakh horse
- Qara Baghi (Hazara tribe)

== See also ==
- Artsakh (disambiguation)
  - Artsakh (historic province), the historic name of the mountainous region of modern-day Karabakh
- Principality of Khachen, a principality that existed in the mountainous region of modern-day Karabakh in the Middle Ages
