= Tudar =

Tudar may refer to:

- Tudar, Azerbaijan, a village
- Tudar, Iran, a village
- Tudar, Mazandaran, Iran, a village

== See also ==
- Tudar Molla, Iran
- Tudar-e Ruteh, Iran
- Tudar-e Samadi, Iran
- Tidar (disambiguation), Iran
