= Qarabağlı =

Qarabağlı or Kalabegla or Kalabegli or Kalabekly meaning from Qarabağ may refer to:

- Qarabağlı, Agsu, Azerbaijan
- Qarabağlı, Khachmaz, Azerbaijan
- Qarabağlı, Salyan, Azerbaijan
- Qarabağlı, Samukh, Azerbaijan
- Qarabağlı, Şabran, Azerbaijan

== See also ==
- Qarabağ (disambiguation)
- Qarabağlar (disambiguation)
- Qarabağ, Agdam, Azerbaijan
