= Kamangar =

Kamangar may refer to:

- Kamangar (surname)
- Kamangar, Iran, a village in Iran
- Kamangars, a Muslim community in North India and Pakistan

== See also ==
- Kamangar Kola (disambiguation), several villages in Iran
- Dadaneh Kamangar, a village in Iran
