= Akdere =

Akdere (literally "white creek"), also spelled Ağdərə or Agdara or Agdere, is a Turkic place name and may refer to:

- Akdere, Adıyaman, a village in Adıyaman Province, Turkey
- Akdere, Nallıhan, a village in Ankara Province, Turkey
- Akdere, Hopa, a village in Artvin Province, Turkey
- Akdere, Silifke, a town in Mersin Province, Turkey
- Ağdərə, Khizi, a village in Khizi Rayon, Azerbaijan
- Ağdərə, Nakhchivan, a village in Azerbaijan
- Akdere, Silvan
- Akdere, Sungurlu
- Ağdərə, Tartar, a town in Azerbaijan also known as Mardakert
- Ağdərə, Tovuz, a village in Tovuz Rayon, Azerbaijan
- Akdere, Yenişehir, Turkey
- Mardakert (town), also known as Ağdərə
- Byala Reka, Shumen Province, historically known as Akdere, Bulgaria
- Byala, Varna Province, historically known as Akdere, Bulgaria
- Valea Albă, a village in Romania

== See also ==
- Karadere (disambiguation)
