= Ağdərə, Azerbaijan =

Ağdərə, Azerbaijan (Azeri for "white creek") may refer to:

- Ağdərə, Khizi, Azerbaijan
- Ağdərə, Nakhchivan, Azerbaijan
- Ağdərə, Tartar, Azerbaijan
- Ağdərə, Tovuz, Azerbaijan
- Mardakert, a province in the Nagorno-Karabakh Republic
