= Qarabağlar =

Garabaghlar or Karabaghlar may refer to:

- Karabağlar, Turkey
- Qarabağlar, Goychay, Azerbaijan
- Qarabağlar, Kangarli, Nakhchivan, Azerbaijan
- Qarabağlar, Samukh, Azerbaijan
- Qarabağlar, Shamkir, Azerbaijan

== See also ==
- Qarabağlı (disambiguation)
