= Kolanı =

Kolanı or Kelany or Kolany or Kelan’ may refer to:

- Kolanı, Hajigabul, Azerbaijan
- Kolanı, Nakhchivan, Azerbaijan
- Kolanı, Salyan, Azerbaijan
- Kolanı, Siazan, Azerbaijan
- Kolanı, Yevlakh, Azerbaijan
