= Kalani =

Kalani may refer to:

- Kalani (name), list of people with the name
- Kalani (percussionist) or Kalani Das, American percussionist, clinician, performer, author, and educator
- Kalani (Star Wars), a Separatist tactical droid in the Star Wars universe
- Kalani, Fars, a village in Dasht-e Barm Rural District, Kuhmareh District, Kazerun County, Fars Province, Iran
- Kalani High School, a school in Honolulu, Hawaii, U.S.
- Kalani Oceanside Retreat, a non-profit retreat center in Hawaii

== See also ==
- Kallani, a village in Sand-e Mir Suiyan Rural District, Dashtiari District, Chabahar County, Sistan and Baluchestan Province, Iran
