= Tazehabad Kikhosrow =

Tazehabad Kikhosrow تازه آباد كيخسرو
- Village
- Location within Iran
- Coordinates: 35°19′40″N 46°38′00″E
- Country: Iran
- Province: Kurdistan
- County: Sanandaj
- Bakhsh: Kalatrazan
- Rural District: Negel

Population (2006)
  - Total: 56
- Time zone: UTC+3:30 (IRST)
  - Summer (DST): UTC+4:30 (IRDT)

Tazehabad Kikhosrow (Persian: تازه آباد كيخسرو, also Romanized as Tāzehābād Kīkhosrow; also known as Āsīāb Kīkhosrow) is a village in Negel Rural District, Kalatrazan District, Sanandaj County, Kurdistan Province, Iran. At the 2006 census, its population was 56, in 11 families. The village is populated by Kurds.
