= Fetreh Zamin =

Fetreh Zamin فطره زمين
- Village
- Location within Iran
- Coordinates: 35°18′08″N 46°42′26″E
- Country: Iran
- Province: Kurdistan
- County: Sanandaj
- Bakhsh: Kalatrazan
- Rural District: Zhavarud-e Gharbi

Population (2006)
  - Total: 85
- Time zone: UTC+3:30 (IRST)
  - Summer (DST): UTC+4:30 (IRDT)

Fetreh Zamin (Persian: فطره زمين, also Romanized as Feţreh Zamīn; also known as Vatreh Zamīn) is a village in Zhavarud-e Gharbi Rural District, Kalatrazan District, Sanandaj County, Kurdistan Province, Iran. At the 2006 census, its population was 85, in 18 families. The village is populated by Kurds.
