= Gazar Darreh, Kalatrazan =

Gazar Darreh گزردره
- Village
- Location within Iran
- Coordinates: 35°24′40″N 46°36′32″E
- Country: Iran
- Province: Kurdistan
- County: Sanandaj
- Bakhsh: Kalatrazan
- Rural District: Kalatrazan

Population (2006)
  - Total: 546
- Time zone: UTC+3:30 (IRST)
  - Summer (DST): UTC+4:30 (IRDT)

Gazar Darreh (Persian: گزردره, also Romanized as Gaz̄ar Darreh and Gezer Darreh; also known as Garz Darreh) is a village in Kalatrazan Rural District, Kalatrazan District, Sanandaj County, Kurdistan Province, Iran. At the 2006 census, its population was 546, in 129 families. The village is populated by Kurds.
