= Kolani =

Kolani may refer to:

- Luigi Colani
- Kolanı (disambiguation), places in Azerbaijan
- Kolani, Iran (disambiguation), places in Iran
