= Baqelabad =

Baqelabad باقل آباد
- Village
- Location within Iran
- Coordinates: 35°22′02″N 46°32′01″E
- Country: Iran
- Province: Kurdistan
- County: Sanandaj
- Bakhsh: Kalatrazan
- Rural District: Kalatrazan

Population (2006)
  - Total: 205
- Time zone: UTC+3:30 (IRST)
  - Summer (DST): UTC+4:30 (IRDT)

Baqelabad (Persian: باقل آباد, also Romanized as Bāqelābād and Bāqlābād; also known as Bāqerābād) is a village in Kalatrazan Rural District, Kalatrazan District, Sanandaj County, Kurdistan Province, Iran. At the 2006 census, its population was 205, in 50 families. The village is populated by Kurds.
