= Peychun =

Peychun پيچون
- Village
- Location within Iran
- Coordinates: 35°20′50″N 46°36′22″E
- Country: Iran
- Province: Kurdistan
- County: Sanandaj
- Bakhsh: Kalatrazan
- Rural District: Negel

Population (2006)
  - Total: 232
- Time zone: UTC+3:30 (IRST)
  - Summer (DST): UTC+4:30 (IRDT)

Peychun (Persian: پيچون, also Romanized as Peychūn; also known as Pā’ī Chūn and Pa yi Chun) is a village in Negel Rural District, Kalatrazan District, Sanandaj County, Kurdistan Province, Iran. At the 2006 census, its population was 232, in 64 families. The village is populated by Kurds.
