= Boneh Dar =

Village in Kurdistan, Iran

Boneh Dar بنه دار
- Village
- Location within Iran
- Coordinates: 35°20′03″N 46°33′11″E
- Country: Iran
- Province: Kurdistan
- County: Sanandaj
- Bakhsh: Kalatrazan
- Rural District: Negel

Population (2006)
  - Total: 175
- Time zone: UTC+3:30 (IRST)
  - Summer (DST): UTC+4:30 (IRDT)

Boneh Dar (Persian: بنه دار, also Romanized as Boneh Dār; also known as Banī Dar, Beni Dar, Boney Darreh, and Bonīdar) is a village in Negel Rural District, Kalatrazan District, Sanandaj County, Kurdistan Province, Iran. At the 2006 census, its population was 175, in 40 families. The village is populated by Kurds.
