= Ganehbu =

Ganehbu گنه بو
- Village
- Location within Iran
- Coordinates: 35°26′23″N 46°44′25″E
- Country: Iran
- Province: Kurdistan
- County: Sanandaj
- Bakhsh: Kalatrazan
- Rural District: Kalatrazan

Population (2006)
  - Total: 561
- Time zone: UTC+3:30 (IRST)
  - Summer (DST): UTC+4:30 (IRDT)

Ganehbu (Persian: گنه بو, also Romanized as Ganehbū; also known as Ganehvā and Jannatbū) is a village in Kalatrazan Rural District, Kalatrazan District, Sanandaj County, Kurdistan Province, Iran. At the 2006 census, its population was 561, in 119 families. The village is populated by Kurds.
