= Sar Huyeh =

Sar Huyeh سرهويه
- Village
- Location within Iran
- Coordinates: 35°12′28″N 46°42′04″E
- Country: Iran
- Province: Kurdistan
- County: Sanandaj
- Bakhsh: Kalatrazan
- Rural District: Zhavarud-e Gharbi

Population (2006)
  - Total: 1,066
- Time zone: UTC+3:30 (IRST)
  - Summer (DST): UTC+4:30 (IRDT)

Sar Huyeh (Persian: سرهويه, also Romanized as Sar Hūyeh and Sar-e Hūyah; also known as Sarhūyān and Sar-i-Huyān) is a village in Zhavarud-e Gharbi Rural District, Kalatrazan District, Sanandaj County, Kurdistan Province, Iran. At the 2006 census, its population was 1,066, in 260 families. The village is populated by Kurds.
