= Sefid Bon =

Sefid Bon سفيدبن
- Village
- Location within Iran
- Coordinates: 35°15′00″N 46°35′00″E
- Country: Iran
- Province: Kurdistan
- County: Sanandaj
- Bakhsh: Kalatrazan
- Rural District: Zhavarud-e Gharbi

Population (2006)
  - Total: 165
- Time zone: UTC+3:30 (IRST)
  - Summer (DST): UTC+4:30 (IRDT)

Sefid Bon (Persian: سفيدبن, also Romanized as Sefīd Bon) is a village in Zhavarud-e Gharbi Rural District, Kalatrazan District, Sanandaj County, Kurdistan Province, Iran. At the 2006 census, its population was 165, in 48 families. The village is populated by Kurds.
