= Giləzi =

Giləzi or Kiljasi or Kilyazi may refer to:

- Giləzi, Khizi, Azerbaijan
- Giləzi, Siazan, Azerbaijan
