= Qasımkənd =

Qasımkənd or Kasymkend may refer to:

- Kasymkend, Khachmaz, Azerbaijan
- Qasımkənd, Khizi, Azerbaijan
- Kasumkent (Azerbaijani: Qasımkənd), Republic of Dagestan, Russia
