= Yarımca =

Yarımca or Yarimka or Yarymdzha or Yarymdzhan or Yarmıca may refer to:

- Yarımca, Khizi, Azerbaijan
- Yarımca, Nakhchivan, Azerbaijan
- Yarımca, Tartar, Azerbaijan
- Yarımca, Elazığ, a town in Kovancılar district of Elazığ Province, Turkey
- Yarımca, Kocaeli, merged with Tütünçiftlik to become Körfez, Kocaeli, Turkey
- Yarımca, Sur
- Yarımca, Uğurludağ
- Yarımca, Yüreğir, a village in Adana Province, Turkey
