= Seh Piran =

Seh Piran سه پيران
- Village
- Location within Iran
- Coordinates: 35°19′29″N 46°45′22″E
- Country: Iran
- Province: Kurdistan
- County: Sanandaj
- Bakhsh: Kalatrazan
- Rural District: Zhavarud-e Gharbi

Population (2006)
  - Total: 376
- Time zone: UTC+3:30 (IRST)
  - Summer (DST): UTC+4:30 (IRDT)

Seh Piran (Persian: سه پيران, also Romanized as Seh Pīrān; also known as Sepehrān, Sepīrān, Spehran, and Spehrān) is a village in Zhavarud-e Gharbi Rural District, Kalatrazan District, Sanandaj County, Kurdistan Province, Iran. At the 2006 census, its population was 376, in 80 families. The village is populated by Kurds.
