= Zanuri =

Zanuri زنوري
- Village
- Location within Iran
- Coordinates: 35°24′06″N 46°33′35″E
- Country: Iran
- Province: Kurdistan
- County: Sanandaj
- Bakhsh: Kalatrazan
- Rural District: Kalatrazan

Population (2006)
  - Total: 162
- Time zone: UTC+3:30 (IRST)
  - Summer (DST): UTC+4:30 (IRDT)

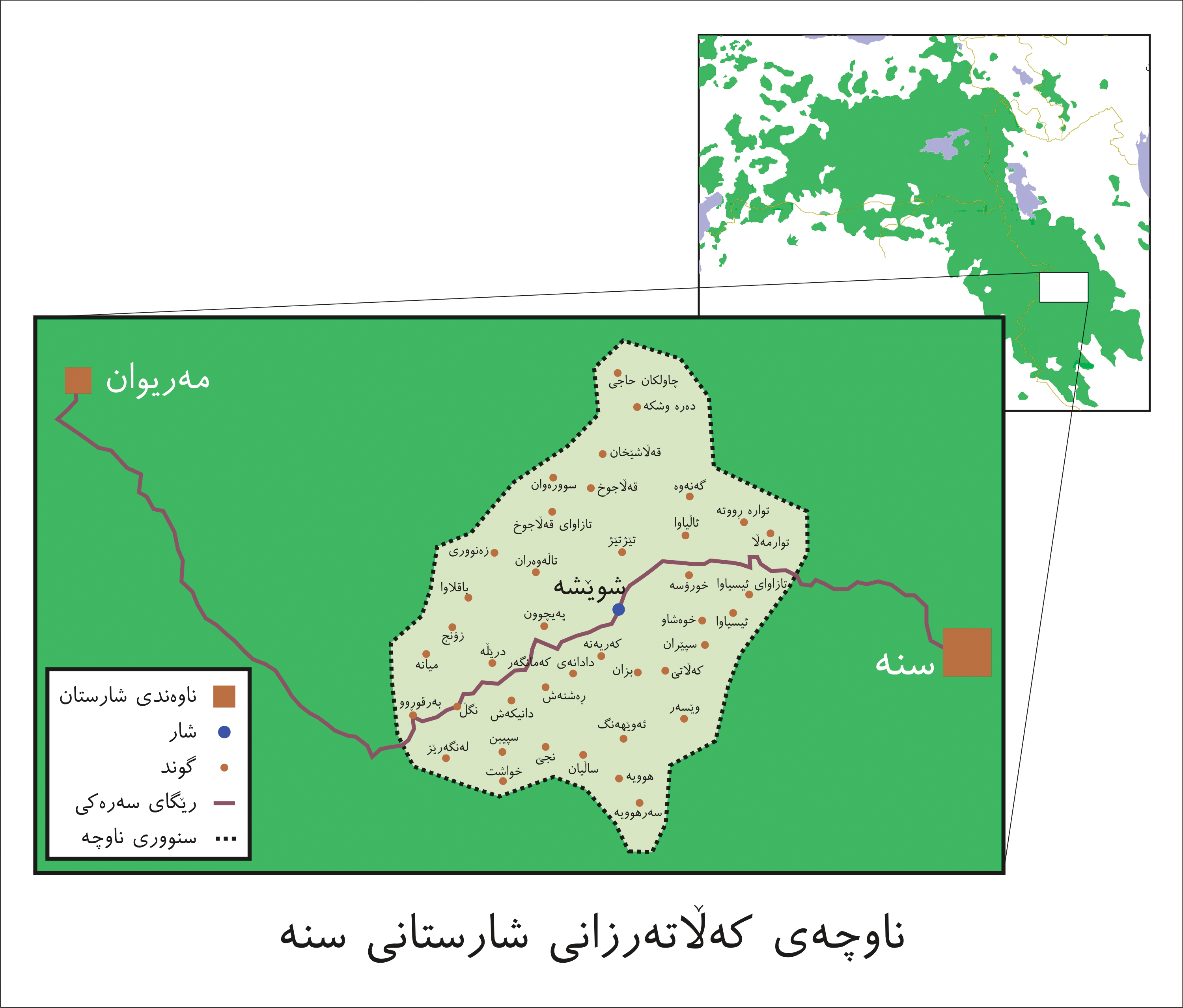
Map of Kalatrazan Rural District in Sanandaj County, Iran

Zanuri (Persian: زنوري, also Romanized as Zanūrī and Zenūrī; also known as Zanūreh) is a village in Kalatrazan Rural District, Kalatrazan District, Sanandaj County, Kurdistan Province, Iran. At the 2006 census, its population was 162, in 45 families. The village is populated by Kurds.
