= Kalatrazan =

Kalatrazan (Persian: کلاترزان) may refer to:

- Kalatrazan District
- Kalatrazan Rural District
