= Tidar =

Tidar (Persian: تيدر) may refer to:

- Tidar, Bashagard, Hormozgan Province
- Tidar, Hajjiabad, Hormozgan Province
- Tidar, Kerman
- Tidar, Lorestan
