= Donguli =

- Location within Azerbaijan
- Coordinates: 40°51′38″N 49°22′41″E
- Country: Azerbaijan
- Rayon: Khizi
- Time zone: UTC+4 (AZT)
  - Summer (DST): UTC+5 (AZT)

Donguli is a village in the Khizi Rayon of Azerbaijan.
