= Khol-Kilyazi =

- Location within Azerbaijan
- Coordinates: 40°53′10″N 49°15′59″E
- Country: Azerbaijan
- Rayon: Khizi
- Time zone: UTC+4 (AZT)
  - Summer (DST): UTC+5 (AZT)

Khol-Kilyazi is a village in the Khizi Rayon of Azerbaijan.
