= Agsiazan =

- Location within Azerbaijan
- Coordinates: 40°57′42″N 49°09′45″E
- Country: Azerbaijan
- Rayon: Khizi
- Time zone: UTC+4 (AZT)
  - Summer (DST): UTC+5 (AZT)

Agsiazan (also, Agsiazan’ and Agsiyazan’) is a village in the Khizi Rayon of Azerbaijan.
