= Bilyasan =

- Location within Azerbaijan
- Coordinates: 40°42′29″N 49°23′47″E
- Country: Azerbaijan
- Rayon: Khizi
- Time zone: UTC+4 (AZT)
  - Summer (DST): UTC+5 (AZT)

Bilyasan is a village in the Khizi Rayon of Azerbaijan.
