= Karadere =

Karadere is a Turkic word meaning "black creek" and may refer to

- Karadere, Anamur, a village in Anamur district of Mersin Province, Turkey
- Karadere, Aydıncık, a village in Aydıncık district of Mersin Province, Turkey
- Karadere, Burhaniye
- Karadere river, that empties into the Black Sea 20 miles east of Trabzon, Turkey
- Karadere, Seydikemer, a neighbourhood in Seydikemer district of Muğla Province, Turkey
- Karadere, Gündoğmuş, a village in Gündoğmuş district of Antalya Province, Turkey
- Qaradərə, a village in Zangilan Rayon, Azerbaijan

== Surname ==
- Nagihan Karadere (born 1984), Turkish female sprint runner

== Other uses ==
- Karadere Dam, a dam in Kastamonu Province, Turkey

== See also ==
- Akdere (disambiguation)
