= Talabi =

Talabı (also, Bash Talaby and Bash-Talabi) is a village and municipality in the Quba Rayon of Azerbaijan

Talabi or Talabı is also a surname. It may refer to:

- Alberta Tinsley-Talabi, American politician and Member of the Michigan House of Representatives
- Talabi Braithwaite (1928–2011), Nigerian insurance broker

== See also ==
- Talabi-Gaynarja elevation, part of Orography of Azerbaijan
