= Məşədi Həsən =

Village and municipality in Khizi Rayon, Azerbaijan

Coordinates: 40°50′N 49°24′E

Məşədi Həsən is a village and municipality in the Khizi Rayon of Azerbaijan. It has a population of 313.
