= Güneyqışlaq =

- Location within Azerbaijan
- Coordinates: 40°55′11″N 48°59′34″E
- Country: Azerbaijan
- Rayon: Khizi
- Municipality: Baxışlı
- Time zone: UTC+4 (AZT)
  - Summer (DST): UTC+5 (AZT)

Güneyqışlaq (also, Gyuneykyshlak, Gyuney-Kishlak, and Tyuneykishlakh) is a village in the Khizi Rayon of Azerbaijan. The village forms part of the municipality of Baxışlı.
