= Veysar =

Veysar or Visar (Persian: ويسر) may refer to:

- Visar, Kurdistan
- Veysar, Mazandaran
