= Kyucheyri =

- Location within Azerbaijan
- Coordinates: 40°58′N 49°08′E
- Country: Azerbaijan
- Rayon: Khizi
- Time zone: UTC+4 (AZT)
  - Summer (DST): UTC+5 (AZT)

Kyucheyri (also, Gyudzhevry) is a village in the Khizi Rayon of Azerbaijan.
