= Visar, Kurdistan =

Visar ويسر
- Village
- Location within Iran
- Coordinates: 35°16′08″N 46°44′13″E
- Country: Iran
- Province: Kurdistan
- County: Sanandaj
- Bakhsh: Kalatrazan
- Rural District: Zhavarud-e Gharbi

Population (2006)
  - Total: 470
- Time zone: UTC+3:30 (IRST)
  - Summer (DST): UTC+4:30 (IRDT)

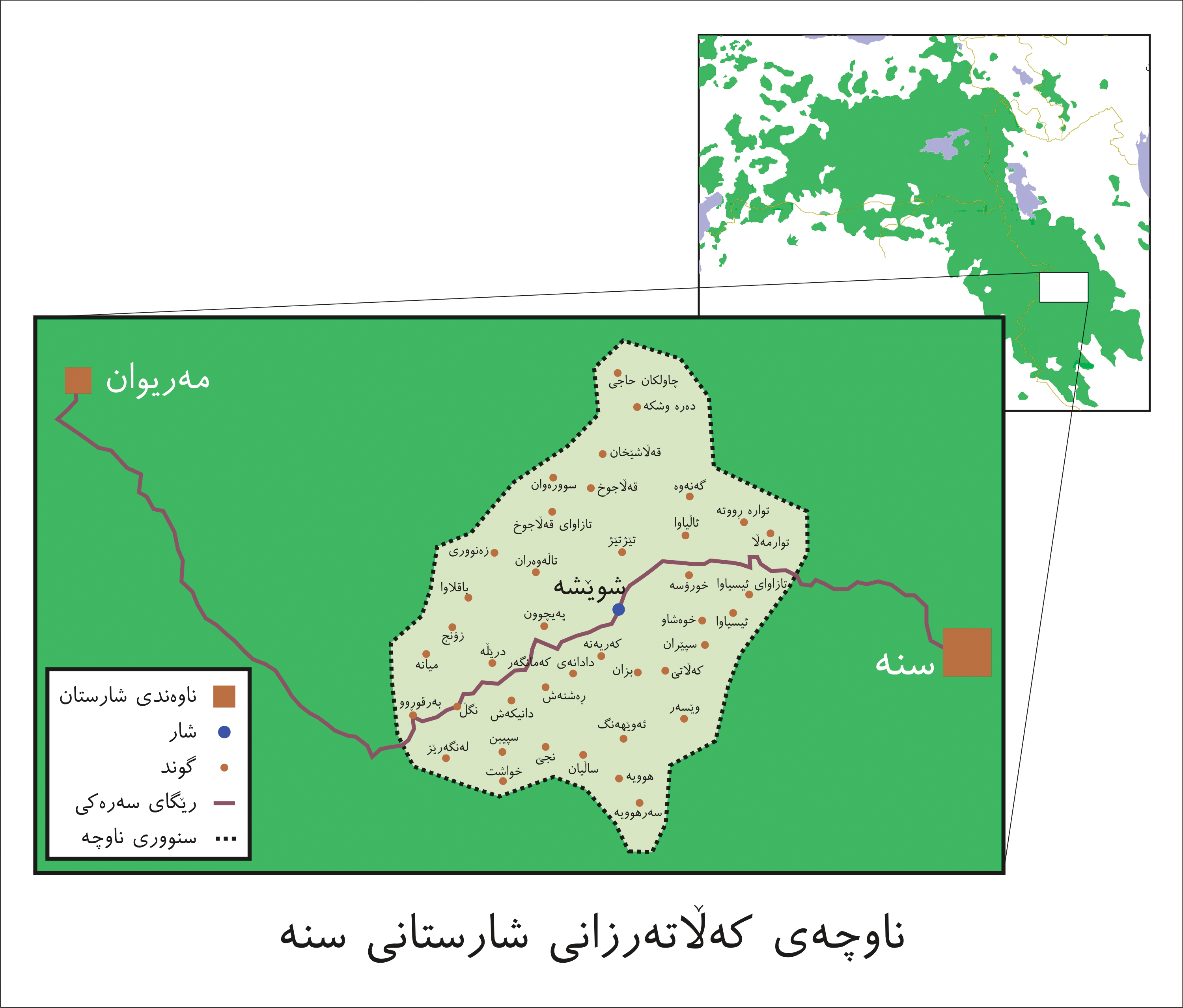
A map of Kalatarzan District, where Visar is located

Visar (Persian: ويسر, also Romanized as Vīsar and Veysar; also known as Vesar) is a village in Zhavarud-e Gharbi Rural District, Kalatrazan District, Sanandaj County, Kurdistan Province, Iran. At the 2006 census, its population was 470, in 121 families. The village is populated by Kurds.
