= Shalgyakh =

- Location within Azerbaijan
- Coordinates: 40°44′45″N 49°21′33″E
- Country: Azerbaijan
- Rayon: Khizi
- Time zone: UTC+4 (AZT)
  - Summer (DST): UTC+5 (AZT)

Shalgyakh (also, Shal’gyakh and Shal’gakh) is a village in the Khizi Rayon of Azerbaijan.
