= Kalani (name) =

Kalani is both a surname and a given name. Some notable people with the name include:

== Surname ==
- Hemu Kalani (1923–1943), Indian revolutionary
- Pappu Kalani (born 1951), Indian criminal and politician
- Mohammad Jafar Kalani (born 1928), Iranian shooter
- Hossein Kalani (born 1945), Iranian football player
- Jyoti Kalani (1951–2021), Indian politician

== Given name ==
- Kalani Sitake (born 1975), Tongan football coach
- Kalani Brown (born 1997), American professional basketball player
- Kalani Pe'a (born 1983), singer
- Kalani Purcell (born 1995), New Zealand basketball player
- Kalani Das, American percussionist

== See also ==
- Kalani (disambiguation)
