= Çisti Klyuç =

Safbulaq
- Location within Azerbaijan
- Coordinates: 40°48′39″N 48°52′36″E
- Country: Azerbaijan
- Rayon: Khizi
- Municipality: Altıağac
- Time zone: UTC+4 (AZT)
  - Summer (DST): UTC+5 (AZT)

Çisti Klyuç (also, Chistyy Klyuch) is a village in the Khizi Rayon of Azerbaijan. The village forms part of the municipality of Altıağac.
