= Fındığan =

- Municipality
- Location within Azerbaijan
- Coordinates: 40°57′26″N 49°02′34″E
- Country: Azerbaijan
- Rayon: Khizi

Population
  - Total: 405
- Time zone: UTC+4 (AZT)
  - Summer (DST): UTC+5 (AZT)

Fındığan (also, Fyndygan and Yukhary Fyndygan) is a village and municipality in the Khizi Rayon of Azerbaijan. It has a population of 405.
