= Baxışlı =

- Municipality
- Location within Azerbaijan
- Coordinates: 40°53′59″N 48°58′57″E
- Country: Azerbaijan
- Rayon: Khizi

Population
  - Total: 315
- Time zone: UTC+4 (AZT)
  - Summer (DST): UTC+5 (AZT)

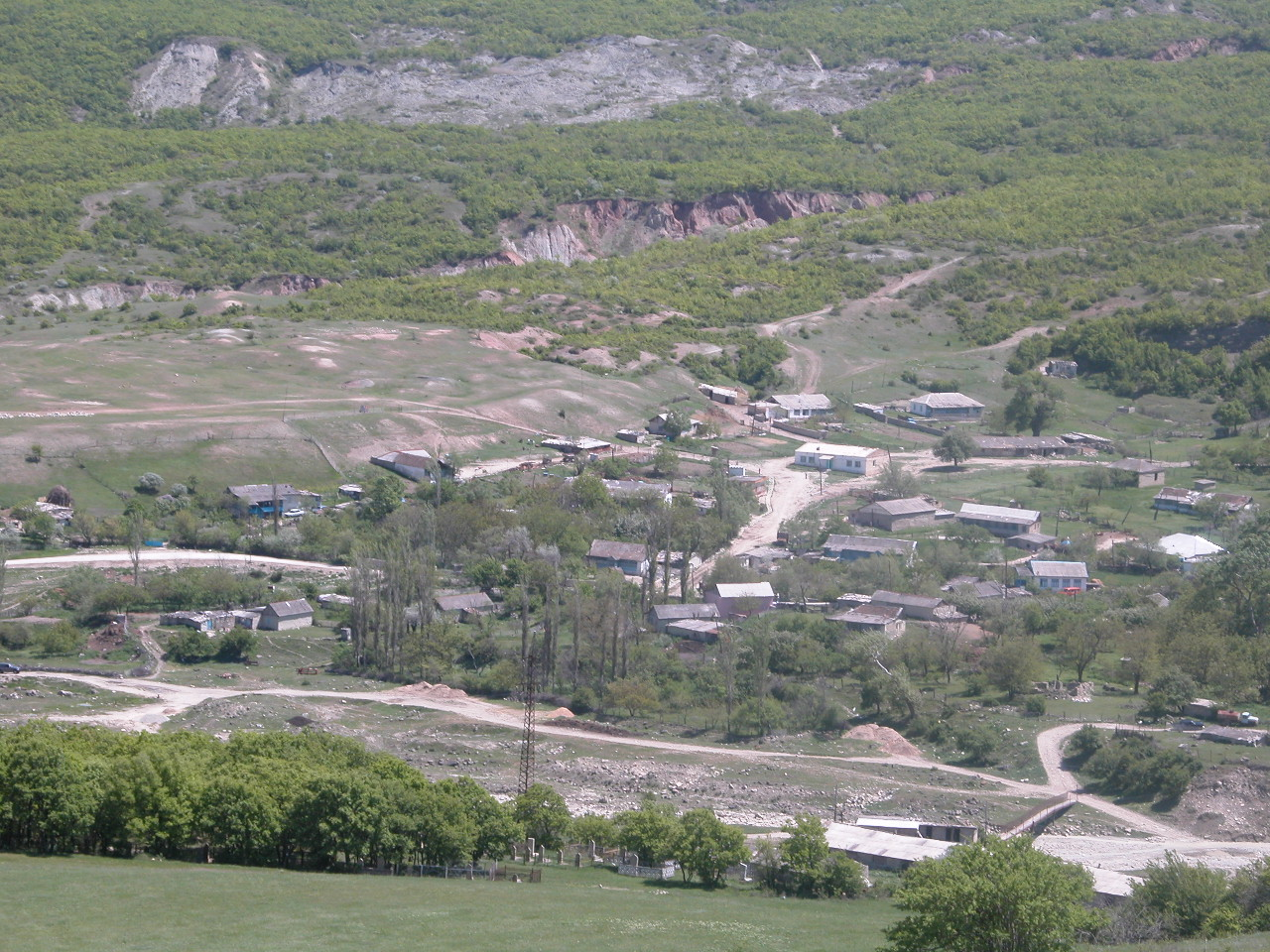
Baxışlı

Baxışlı (also, Bakhshily and Bakhshyly) is a village and municipality in the Khizi Rayon of Azerbaijan. It has a population of 315. The municipality consists of the villages of Baxışlı, Bəyəhmədyurd, Vərdağ, and Güneyqışlaq.
