= Tudar-e Ruteh =

Tudar-e Ruteh تودارروته
- Village
- Location within Iran
- Coordinates: 35°24′57″N 46°47′38″E
- Country: Iran
- Province: Kurdistan
- County: Sanandaj
- Bakhsh: Kalatrazan
- Rural District: Kalatrazan

Population (2006)
  - Total: 640
- Time zone: UTC+3:30 (IRST)
  - Summer (DST): UTC+4:30 (IRDT)

Tudar-e Ruteh (Persian: تودارروته, also Romanized as Tūdār-e Rūteh; also known as Tūdār-e Rūneh, Tū’ī Dartān, Tūtdār-e Rūteh, and Tu yi Dar Ruten) is a village in Kalatrazan Rural District, Kalatrazan District, Sanandaj County, Kurdistan Province, Iran. At the 2006 census, its population was 640, in 154 families. The village is populated by Kurds.
