= Avihang =

Village in Kurdistan province, Iran

Avihang Persian: اويهنگ
- Village
- Location within Iran Location within Iran Kurdistan
- Coordinates: 35°15′25″N 46°40′48″E
- Country: Iran
- Province: Kurdistan
- County: Sanandaj
- District: Kalatrazan
- Rural District: Zhavarud-e Gharbi

Population (2016)
  - Total: 1,372
- Time zone: UTC+3:30 (IRST)

Avihang (Persian: اويهنگ) (Note: Also romanized as Āvīhang and Avīhang; also known as Āb-i-Hang) is a village in, and the capital of, Zhavarud-e Gharbi Rural District of Kalatrazan District, Sanandaj County, Kurdistan province, Iran.

== Demographics ==
=== Ethnicity ===
The village is populated by Kurds.

=== Population ===
At the time of the 2006 National Census, the village's population was 1,886 in 497 households. The following census in 2011 counted 1,563 people in 484 households. The 2016 census measured the population of the village as 1,372 people in 432 households. It was the most populous village in its rural district.
