= Candy Cane Mountains =

Shale mountains in Azerbaijan

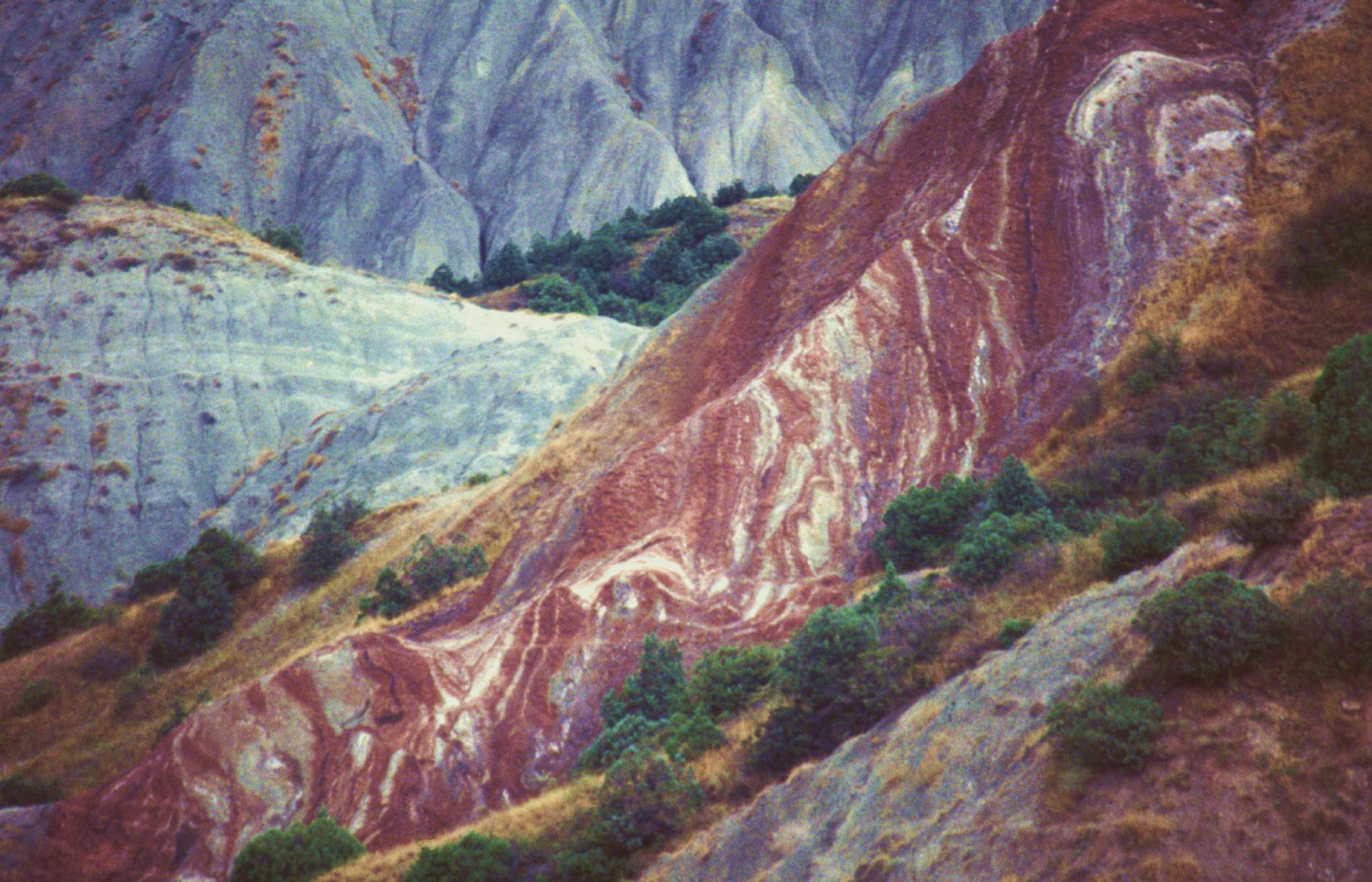
Candy Cane Mountains near Altıağac.

The Candy Cane Mountains (Azerbaijani: Şəkər əsası dağları) are shale mountains in the Khizi and Siyazan districts of Azerbaijan, part of the Greater Caucasus mountain range. The Candy Cane Mountains were originally dubbed so by travel author Mark Elliott in his guidebook Azerbaijan with Excursions to Georgia. The mountains' colors are produced by groundwater that alters the oxidation state of the iron compounds in the earth.

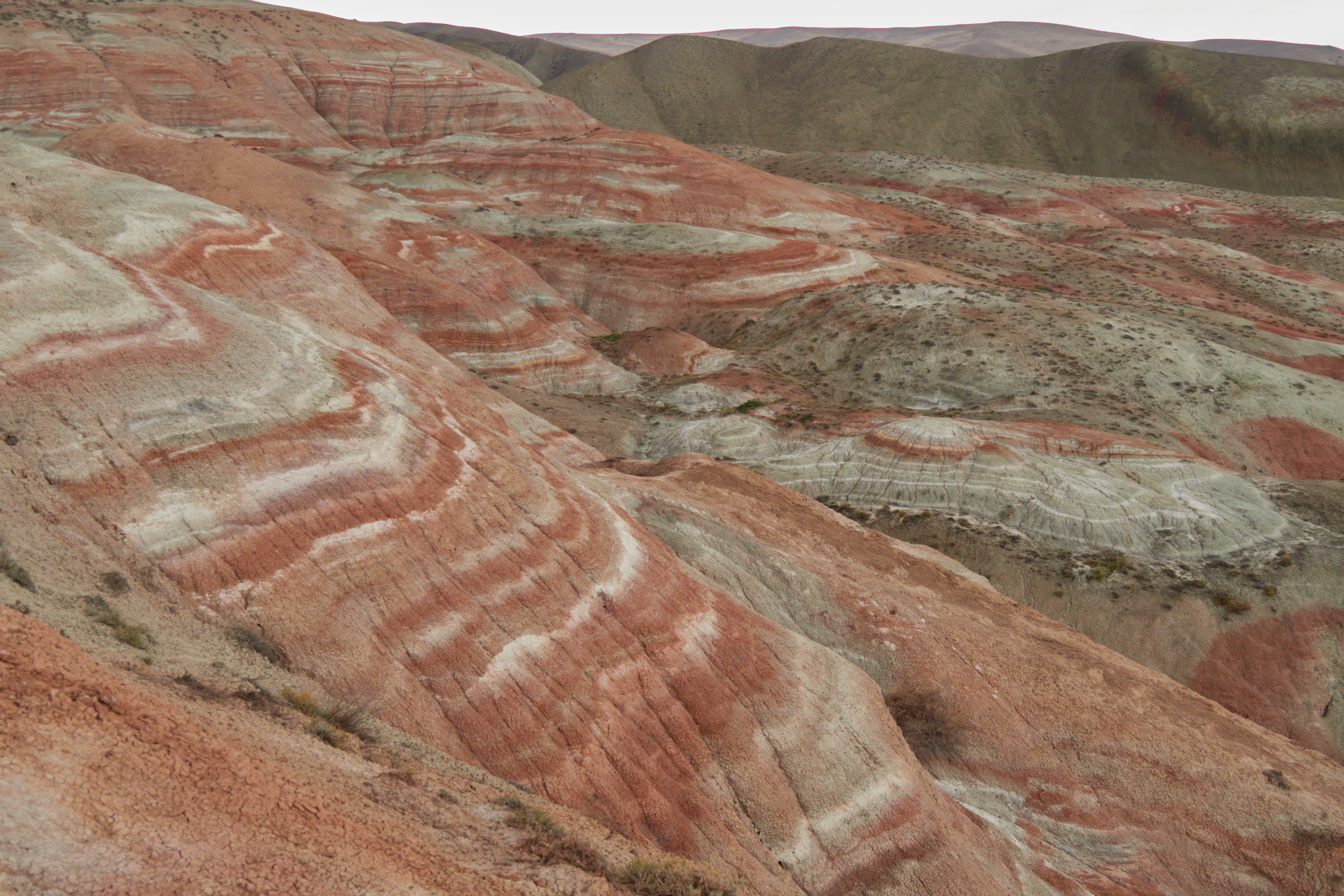
Striped sedimentary badlands, Candy Cane Mountains

The Candy Cane Mountains contain numerous belemnites and fossils from the Cretaceous period, many of which can be spotted on the surface. The mountains represent a natural landmark characterized by distinctive lithological composition and pronounced coloration. The formations are primarily composed of shale and other sedimentary rocks, exhibiting stratigraphic layers dating to the Cretaceous period. The red-and-white banded structure of the rocks is associated with processes of iron mineral oxidation and diagenesis within the geological history of the Greater Caucasus.

Candy Cane Mountains 2026

== See also ==
- Orography of Azerbaijan
