= Tervakharva =

- Location within Azerbaijan
- Coordinates: 40°38′N 49°11′E
- Country: Azerbaijan
- Rayon: Khizi
- Time zone: UTC+4 (AZT)
  - Summer (DST): UTC+5 (AZT)

Tervakharva is a village in the Khizi Rayon of Azerbaijan.
