= Aghirja =

Agirdzha
- Location within Azerbaijan
- Coordinates: 40°39′32″N 49°27′42″E
- Country: Azerbaijan
- Rayon: Khizi
- Time zone: UTC+4 (AZT)
  - Summer (DST): UTC+5 (AZT)

Agirdzha is a village in the Khizi Rayon of Azerbaijan.
