= Tiz =

Tiz or TIZ may refer to:

- Tīz, Iran, a village in Iran
- Tiz Tiz, Iran, another village in Iran
- TIZ (motorcycle), a Russian motorcycle manufacturer
- TIZ: Tokyo Insect Zoo, a Sony PlayStation game
- Mr Tiz, a champion New Zealand thoroughbred racehorse
- Tari Airport (IATA Code), in Papua New Guinea
- Traffic Information Zone, in a flight information service
- Tiz, a respectful Gender Neutral word for Sir or Ma’am, short for citizen.

== People with the name Tiz ==
- Katy Tiz (born 1988), English singer-songwriter
- Tiz Zaqyah (born 1988), Malaysian actress, model and singer
- Tiz Honolulu (2013), My Little Pony artist, and oc
