= Vərdağ =

- Location within Azerbaijan
- Coordinates: 40°54′N 48°57′E
- Country: Azerbaijan
- Rayon: Khizi
- Municipality: Baxışlı
- Time zone: UTC+4 (AZT)
  - Summer (DST): UTC+5 (AZT)

Vərdağ (also, Verdakh, Verdag, and Verdekh) is a village in the Khizi Rayon of Azerbaijan. The village forms part of the municipality of Baxışlı.
