= Tudar-e Molla =

Tudar-e Molla تودارملا
- Village
- Location within Iran
- Coordinates: 35°24′22″N 46°49′17″E
- Country: Iran
- Province: Kurdistan
- County: Sanandaj
- Bakhsh: Kalatrazan
- Rural District: Kalatrazan

Population (2006)
  - Total: 649
- Time zone: UTC+3:30 (IRST)
  - Summer (DST): UTC+4:30 (IRDT)

Tudar-e Molla (Persian: تودارملا, also Romanized as Tūdār-e Mollā and Tūdār Mollā; also known as Tūtdār-e Mollā and Tu-yi-Dar Mullah) is a village in Kalatrazan Rural District, Kalatrazan District, Sanandaj County, Kurdistan Province, Iran. At the 2006 census, its population was 649, in 135 families. The village is populated by Kurds.
