= Kovar (disambiguation) =

Kovar is a nickel–cobalt ferrous alloy.

Kovar may also refer to:

- Kovář, Czech surname
- Kővár, Hungarian name for the Romanian village of Remetea Chioarului
- Kövər, village and municipality in Azerbaijan
- Kovar, Texas, USA

== See also ==
- Kabar or Khavar, a Khazar tribe that reached Carpathia
- Khowar language, a Dardic language of Pakistan
