= Əmbizlər =

- Location within Azerbaijan
- Coordinates: 40°47′13″N 49°03′36″E
- Country: Azerbaijan
- Rayon: Khizi
- Municipality: Ağdərə
- Time zone: UTC+4 (AZT)
  - Summer (DST): UTC+5 (AZT)

Əmbizlər (also, Ambizlyar) is a village in the Khizi Rayon of Azerbaijan. The village forms part of the municipality of Ağdərə.
