= Kichik-Gimchi =

- Location within Azerbaijan
- Coordinates: 40°43′N 49°12′E
- Country: Azerbaijan
- Rayon: Khizi
- Time zone: UTC+4 (AZT)
  - Summer (DST): UTC+5 (AZT)

Kichik-Gimchi is a village in the Khizi Rayon of Azerbaijan.
