= Isaabad, Kurdistan =

Village in Kurdistan province, Iran

Isaabad Persian: عيسي آباد
- Village
- Location within Iran Location within Iran Kurdistan
- Coordinates: 35°20′56″N 46°47′00″E
- Country: Iran
- Province: Kurdistan
- County: Sanandaj
- District: Kalatrazan
- Rural District: Kalatrazan

Population (2016)
  - Total: 1,036
- Time zone: UTC+3:30 (IRST)

Isaabad (Persian: عيسي آباد) (Note: Also romanized as ‘Īsáābād and ‘Īsī Ābād) is a village in Kalatrazan Rural District of Kalatrazan District, Sanandaj County, Kurdistan province, Iran.

== Demographics ==
=== Ethnicity ===
The village is populated by Kurds.

=== Population ===
At the time of the 2006 National Census, the village's population was 1,056 in 273 households. The following census in 2011 counted 1,056 people in 310 households. The 2016 census measured the population of the village as 1,036 people in 319 households. It was the most populous village in its rural district.
