= Negel, Kurdistan =

Village in Kurdistan province, Iran

Negel Persian: نگل
- Village
- Location within Iran Location within Iran Kurdistan
- Coordinates: 35°17′16″N 46°31′22″E
- Country: Iran
- Province: Kurdistan
- County: Sanandaj
- District: Kalatrazan
- Rural District: Negel

Population (2016)
  - Total: 1,719
- Time zone: UTC+3:30 (IRST)

Negel (Persian: نگل) (Note: Also known as Nigal, Nīgel, and Nowgel) is a village in, and the capital of, Negel Rural District of Kalatrazan District, Sanandaj County, Kurdistan province, Iran. It was the capital of Kalatrazan Rural District until its capital was transferred to the city of Shuyesheh.

== Demographics ==
=== Ethnicity ===
The village is populated by Kurds. An old manuscript copy of the Quran is kept in a safe in the village's mosque. The copy is a parchment with the verses of the Quran written in Kufic script.

=== Population ===
At the time of the 2006 National Census, the village's population was 1,697 in 414 households. The following census in 2011 counted 2,081 people in 529 households. The 2016 census measured the population of the village as 1,719 people in 513 households. It was the most populous village in its rural district.
