= Tizh Tizh =

Tizh Tizh تيژتيژ
- Village
- Location within Iran
- Coordinates: 35°23′42″N 46°41′09″E
- Country: Iran
- Province: Kurdistan
- County: Sanandaj
- Bakhsh: Kalatrazan
- Rural District: Kalatrazan

Population (2006)
  - Total: 282
- Time zone: UTC+3:30 (IRST)
  - Summer (DST): UTC+4:30 (IRDT)

Tizh Tizh (Persian: تيژتيژ, also romanized as Tīzh Tīzh; also known as Tiz Tiz) is a village in Kalatrazan Rural District, Kalatrazan District, Sanandaj County, Kurdistan Province, Iran. At the 2006 census, its population was 282, in 66 families. The village is populated by Kurds.
