= Bəyəhmədyurd =

- Location within Azerbaijan
- Coordinates: 40°54′48″N 48°57′40″E
- Country: Azerbaijan
- Rayon: Khizi
- Municipality: Baxışlı
- Time zone: UTC+4 (AZT)
  - Summer (DST): UTC+5 (AZT)

Bəyəhmədyurd (also, Beyakhmedyurd and Beyakhmed-Yurdu) is a village in the Khizi Rayon of Azerbaijan. The village forms part of the municipality of Baxışlı.
