= Zhavarud =

Zhavarud (Persian: ژاورود) may refer to:

- Zhavarud-e Gharbi Rural District
- Zhavarud-e Sharqi Rural District

== See also ==
- Zhavehrud Rural District
