= Qızılqazma =

Qızılqazma or Kyzylkazma may refer to:

- Qızılqazma, Davachi, Azerbaijan
- Qızılqazma, Khizi, Azerbaijan
