= Dadaneh Kamangar =

Dadaneh Kamangar دادانه كمانگر
- Village
- Location within Iran
- Coordinates: 35°18′39″N 46°37′57″E
- Country: Iran
- Province: Kurdistan
- County: Sanandaj
- Bakhsh: Kalatrazan
- Rural District: Negel

Population (2006)
  - Total: 341
- Time zone: UTC+3:30 (IRST)
  - Summer (DST): UTC+4:30 (IRDT)

Dadaneh Kamangar (Persian: دادانه كمانگر, also Romanized as Dādāneh Kamāngar and Dādāneh-ye Kamāngar; also known as Dadaneh, Dādāneh Kamāngīr, and Dowdāneh-ye Darrelah) is a village in Negel Rural District, Kalatrazan District, Sanandaj County, Kurdistan Province, Iran. At the 2006 census, its population was 341, in 81 families. The village is populated by Kurds.
