= Yarımca, Khizi =

Yarımca
- Location within Azerbaijan
- Coordinates: 40°51′58″N 49°00′40″E
- Country: Azerbaijan
- Rayon: Khizi
- Municipality: Altıağac
- Time zone: UTC+4 (AZT)
  - Summer (DST): UTC+5 (AZT)

Yarımca (also, Yarymdzha and Yarymdzhan) is a village in the Khizi Rayon of Azerbaijan. The village forms part of the municipality of Altıağac.
