= Şəhadət =

- Municipality
- Location within Azerbaijan
- Coordinates: 40°38′38″N 47°44′08″E
- Country: Azerbaijan
- Rayon: Goychay

Population
  - Total: 1,747
- Time zone: UTC+4 (AZT)
  - Summer (DST): UTC+5 (AZT)

Şəhadət (also, Shadet and Shakhadat) is a village and municipality in the Goychay Rayon of Azerbaijan. It has a population of 1,747. The municipality consists of the villages of Şəhadət and Qarabağlar.
