= Şıxlar, Khizi =

Şıxlar
- Location within Azerbaijan
- Coordinates: 40°52′N 49°13′E
- Country: Azerbaijan
- Rayon: Khizi
- Time zone: UTC+4 (AZT)
  - Summer (DST): UTC+5 (AZT)

Şıxlar (also, Shikhlyar and Shykhlar) is a village in the Khizi Rayon of Azerbaijan.
