= Qasımkənd, Khizi =

Qasımkənd
- Location within Azerbaijan
- Coordinates: 40°44′16″N 49°05′00″E
- Country: Azerbaijan
- Rayon: Khizi
- Municipality: Ağdərə
- Time zone: UTC+4 (AZT)
  - Summer (DST): UTC+5 (AZT)

Qasımkənd (also, Kasymkend) is a village in the Khizi Rayon of Azerbaijan. The village forms part of the municipality of Ağdərə.
