= Tudar, Azerbaijan =

Tudar
- Location within Azerbaijan
- Coordinates: 40°44′04″N 49°04′19″E
- Country: Azerbaijan
- Rayon: Khizi
- Municipality: Ağdərə
- Time zone: UTC+4 (AZT)
  - Summer (DST): UTC+5 (AZT)

Tudar is a village in the Khizi Rayon of Azerbaijan. The village forms part of the municipality of Ağdərə.
