= İsakənd =

- Municipality
- Location within Azerbaijan
- Coordinates: 40°45′52″N 45°40′11″E
- Country: Azerbaijan
- Rayon: Tovuz

Population
  - Total: 1,029
- Time zone: UTC+4 (AZT)
  - Summer (DST): UTC+5 (AZT)

İsakənd (also, Isakend) is a village and municipality in the Tovuz Rayon of Azerbaijan. It has a population of 1,029. The municipality consists of the villages of İsakənd, Aşralar, Ağdərə, and Qarabağlılar.
