= Qızılqazma, Khizi =

Qızılqazma
- Location within Azerbaijan
- Coordinates: 40°52′42″N 49°00′06″E
- Country: Azerbaijan
- Rayon: Khizi
- Municipality: Altıağac
- Time zone: UTC+4 (AZT)
  - Summer (DST): UTC+5 (AZT)

Qızılqazma (also, Kyzylkazma) is a village in the Khizi Rayon of Azerbaijan. The village forms part of the municipality of Altıağac.
