= Barlıbağ =

Coordinates: 40°49′N 46°10′E

Barlybagh (Azerbaijani: Barlıbağ; known as Nizami until 1994) is a village in the municipality of Garabaghlar in the Shamkir District of Azerbaijan.
