= Kolani, Iran =

Kolani or Kalani (Persian: كلاني) may refer to:

- Kalani, Fars
- Kolani, Lorestan
- Kolani, Sistan and Baluchestan
- Kolani, Chabahar, Sistan and Baluchestan Province
