= Orography of Azerbaijan =

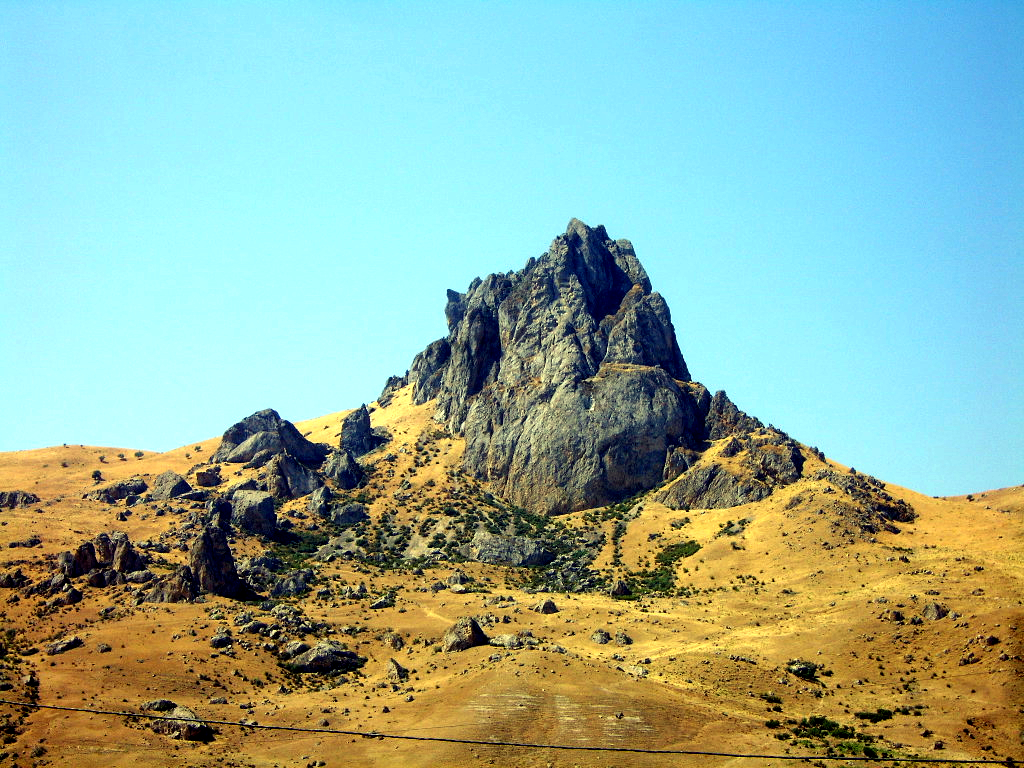
Besh Barmag Mountain ("Five Finger Mountain") is located in Absheron, Azerbaijan.

Orography of Azerbaijan refers to the rocky, mountainous and elevated terrains in Azerbaijan. The tectonic structure is typical for the orography of the country. The main morphostructural units are the Greater Caucasus, the Lesser Caucasus, the Gusar plane, the Samur-Devechi lowland, the Kur intermountain trough, the Karabagh volcanic highland, the near and middle Araz Ridges and Talysh Mountains.

== General information ==
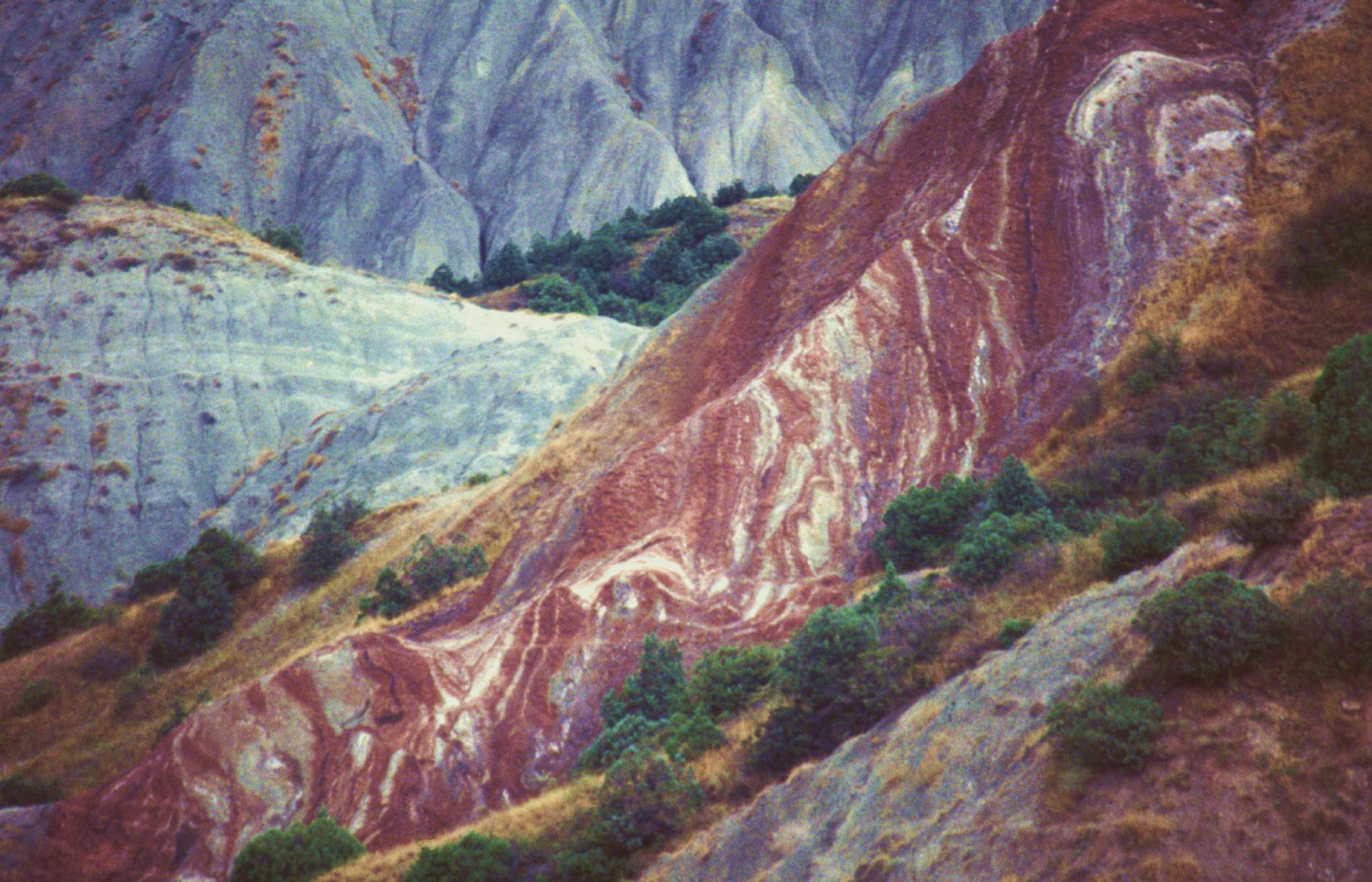
The Candy Cane Mountains near Altıağac

Azerbaijan is typified by relief of different kinds and complexity. Over 50% of the country's area consists of the mountain ridges, crests, yailas and plateaus rise up to hypsometric levels of 400–1,000 m (including the Middle and Lower lowlands), in some places (Talish, Jeyranchol-Ajinohur and Langabiz-Alat foreranges) up to 100–120 m, as well as 0–50 m up (Gobustan, Absheron) the remaining parts of which are plains and lowlands. Hypsometric marks within the Caucasus region vary in the range from about -28 m at the Caspian Sea shoreline up to 4,466 m at Mount Bazardüzü.

=== Quantitative distribution ===
The quantitative area distribution of Azerbaijan according to the hypsometric levels is as follows:

- 18% is located below the ocean level.
- 24% has hypsometric marks ranging from 0 to 200 m.
- 15.5% is covered by areas which elevation ranges from 200 to 500 m.
- 15.5% is covered by areas which elevation marks ranges from 500 to 1,000 m.
- 19.5% is covered by areas which elevation ranges from 1,000 to 2,000 m high.
- 6.5% is covered by areas which elevation ranges from 2,000 to 3,000 m.
- 1% is covered by areas which elevation marks are over 3,000 m high.

The average elevation is 384 m high. Principle orographic units of Azerbaijan consist of the Caucasus mountain system, Samur-Davachi lowland (in conjunction with Gusar inclined plain), Kur River lowland, Minor Caucasus, and Talish mountain systems.

== Caucasus mountains system ==
The southeast part of the Caucasus mountain region is located within Azerbaijan. The basic orographic elements of this part of the Caucasus system are Major Caucasus system or Watershed Ridge and the Lateral ridge. Major Caucasus ridge constitutes large portion of the Caucasus system and extends southeast off Tinov-Rosso elevation (3,385 m) is located at Azerbaijan border with Georgia and Dagestan.

=== Major Caucasus ===
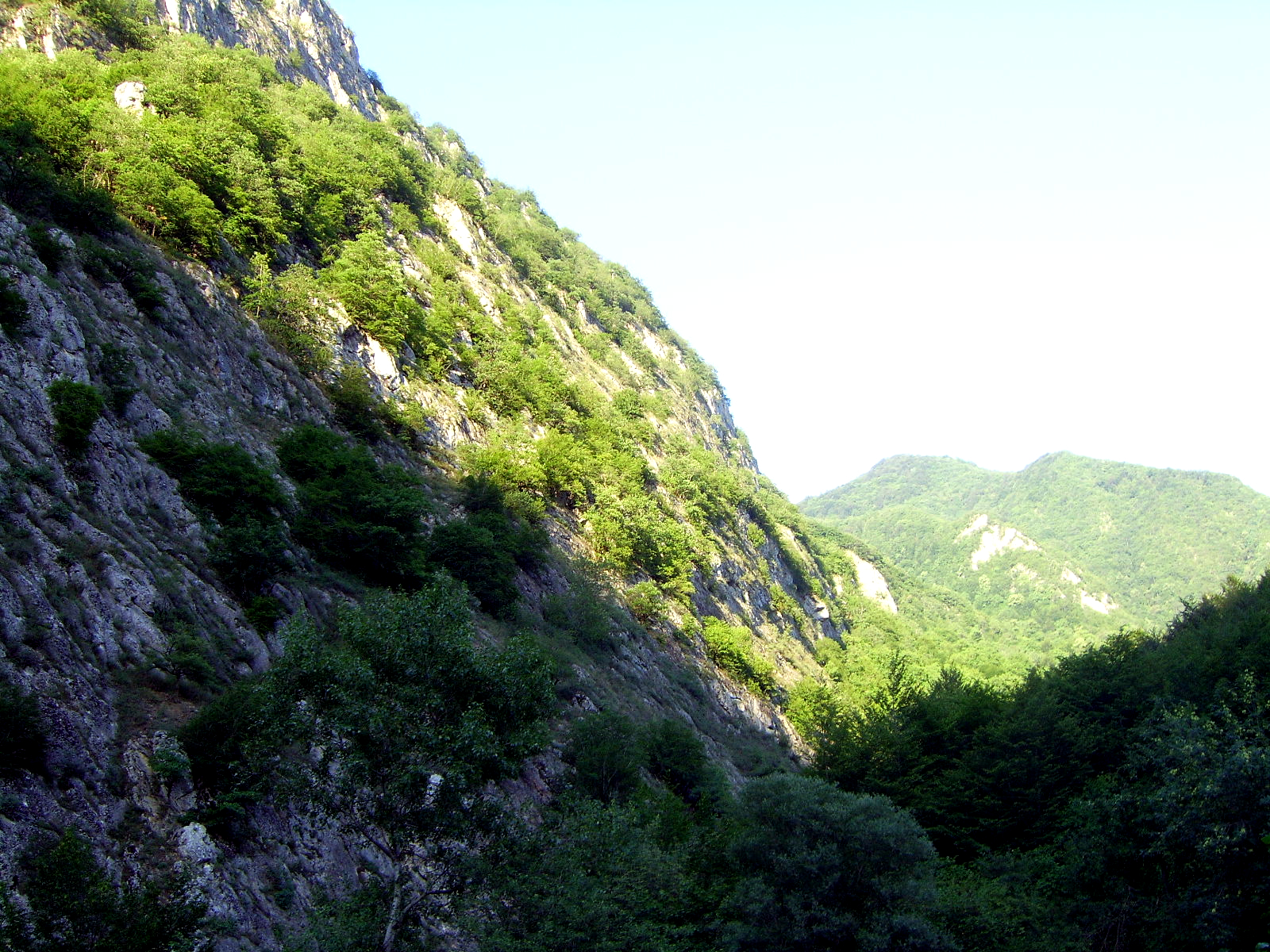
Mountains of Tingalty near Quba

The Major Caucasus or Watershed Ridge is not crossed with any river valleys and therefore it is also called Watershed Ridge. Most part of the ridge elevation is over 3,000 m high, and only in its central part it exceeds 4,000 m height; which are:

- Bazardüzü – 4,466 m
- Tufandagh – 4,191 m
- Bazaryurd – 4,126 m

Beginning from Babadagh peak (located at 3629m, means "Father Mountain") the same ridge elevation gradually goes down and becomes wider. Starting from Dubrar elevation (2,205 m), Major Caucasus ridge plunges northeastward towards the Caspian Sea like expanded fan having been cut by river valleys into separate ridges like Gadi-Kurkachidagh, Aladagh, Kemchi and others.

=== Lateral Ridge ===
The same ridges are further divided into smaller and lower ridges to pass into low elevation mountain region named Gobustan, and further on into Absheron Peninsula. North off and parallel to the Great Caucasus ridge there is a southeast trending ridge called Lateral, of which Azerbaijan section starts from the Shahdagh (located at 4,243 m, means "Kings Mountain") extending and getting lower southeastward and terminates at Beshbarmag (located at 546 m, Besh Barmag Mountain means "Five Finger Mountain") pinnacle. The southeastern section of lateral Ridge Tengi-Beshbarmagh is a medium and low-altitude mountain erosion-denudation relief. The relief of this part consists of the Jurassic and Cretaceous limestone and clay. Lateral ridge is divided into stand-alone blocks-Plateaus (Shahdagh, Gizilgaya, Budugh, and others) by river valleys that begin from Great Caucasus ridge. Northwestern part of the Lateral Ridge matches up to the Shahdagh-Khizi geosyncline constituted of thick Upper Jurassic and Lower Cretaceous dolomite limestone. They create a series of highland plateaus with delimiting covered and steep slopes.

=== Talabi-Gaynarja elevation ===
Northeast off and parallel to the Lateral ridge there is Talabi-Gaynarja elevation, which elevation ranges from 1,000–1,100 m in the west down to 150–200 m in the east. Ridges and elevations are divided from each other by valleys and intermontane troughs (Shahnabad, Khinalyg, Erphee, Gonagcand, Kaltan, Gilgilchay, Tigchay, Rustov, Perebedil and others).

The southern flank of the Great Caucasus ridge descended to Alazan-Ayrichay valley (in some sources Alazan-Haftaran valley, whereas in others it is considered one of the Kur River valley parts) that in some places is parallel to the mentioned ridge. Said above valley begins from Georgia and is 210 km long and 30 km wide in Azerbaijan. Nialdagh ridge which elevation reaches up to 2,100 m high is extended parallel to the Great Caucasus one apart through Lahidge valley. They characterized by the middle-altitude mountain denudation relief.

=== Jeirankechmez depression ===
The depression is followed by linearly extended folded ridges and dome-shaped elevations substituting with wide synclinal valleys and constitutes in plan to the eastern part of the Shamakhy-Gobustan syncline. The northwestern section of the Jeyrankechmez corresponds to the topography of the Baku age alluvial-proluvial plain. The southeastern part of the depression characterized by younger abrasion-accretion marine plain and relief composed of the large brachyanticline elevations and broken by lengthwise ruptures. Mud volcanoes are typical for there. The depression is limited by the Alyat range and the Langebiz low-altitude mountain range from the south part. This section is consist of Paleogene, Miocene and Pliocene rocks.

=== Absheron peninsula ===
The South-Eastern Caucasus ends in the Absheron peninsula and the western part bordering the Dubrar system. Yunusdagh, Ylkhydagh and Koun are the highest parts of the peninsula about 300–350 meters. The topography of the northern area is hummock and hollow. Mud volcanoes are typical for this part and salt lakes are observed, too. There are Akhtarma, Lokbatan, Bozdagh mud volcanoes in the southwest part of the peninsula.

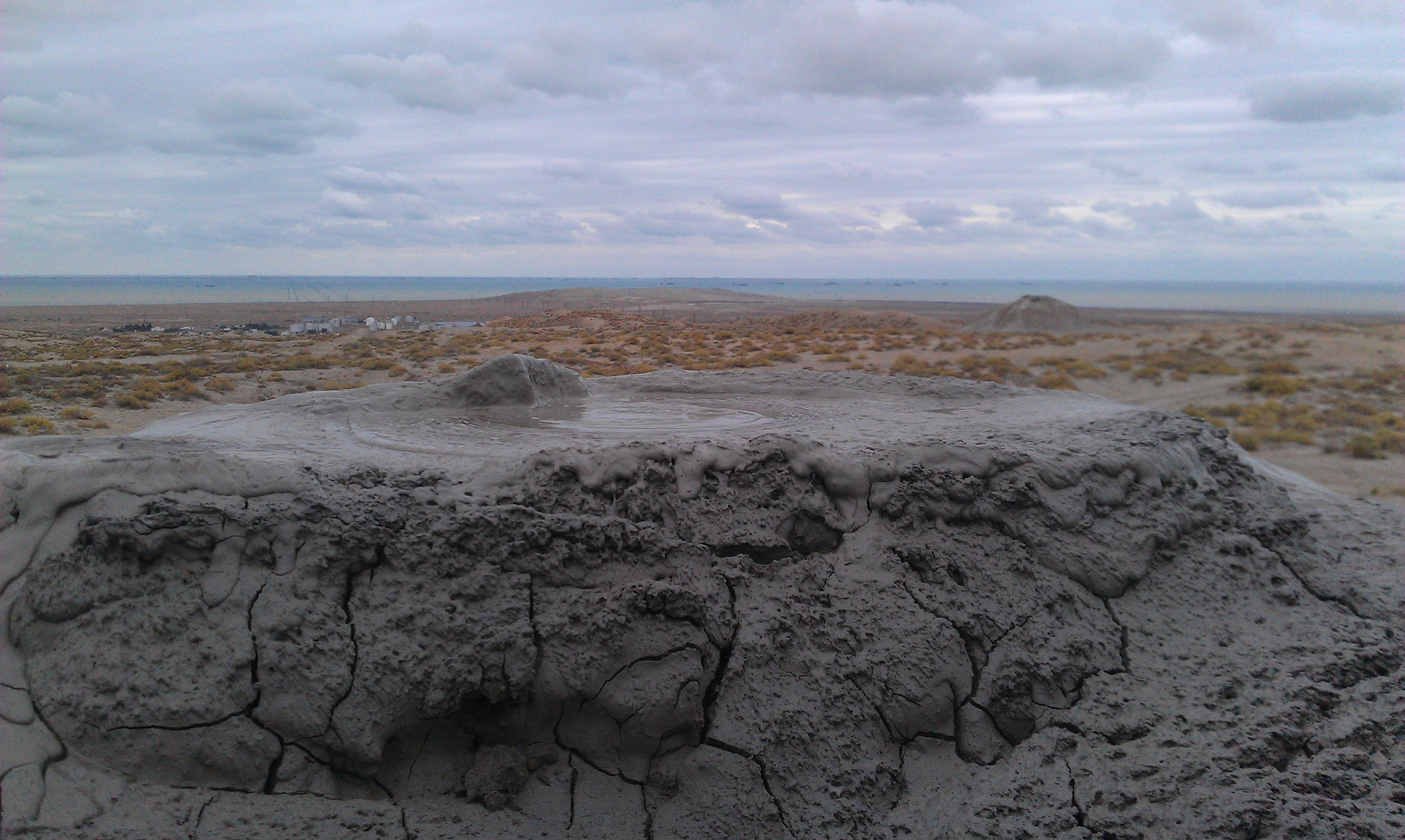
Mud Volcano in Absheron peninsula

The eastern part of the Absheron peninsula is flat with a 38-meter maximal height. Bina, Govsan, Tyrkyan and Zirya are below the sea level. Oil and gas-bearing areas are typical for peninsula.

=== Lesser Caucasus ===
The Lesser Caucasus Mountain is less high and has a folded-boulder structure caused by the presence of abyssal fractures of transversal and longitudinal striking. The prominent elevations are Murguz, Murovdagh, Shakhdagh, Garabagh, Eastern Goycha, and Mykhtekyan. Shakhdagh ridge consists of volcanic rocks and Upper Cretaceous, Eocene carbonate, and consistent to the same-name syncline. From the northwestern part, Shakhdagh Mountain of the Lesser Caucasus stripes to the southeastern Gilandagh Mountain, and from this part joins Murovdagh. Gyamyshdagh Mountain is the highest point with 3,724 meter height. Northeastern and northern sections of Shakhdagh and Murovdagh Ridge are composed of erosional spurs such as Chyngldagh, Pant, and Kalteke. Shakhdagh, Murovdagh, and Eastern Goycha Ridge are followed by highlands and troughs. The riverside parts characterized by well-preserved peneplanation surfaces of the Early-Middle Miocene Oligocene, Middle Miocene, and Late Pliocene ages.

Eastern Goycha Ridge consists of Eocene, volcanic-sedimentary rocks, and Miopliocene volcanogenic thickness. Ketidagh Mountain is the highest point of the ridge with 3,399 meters in height.

The Garabagh Ridge enlarges in the central part of the Lesser Caucasus southeastern edge. The main peaks of Garabagh are Gyrkhgyz (2,823 m), Boyuk Kirs (2,725 m) and Ziyarat (2,478 m).

=== Garabagh highland ===
The Garabagh highland is volcanic oriented and covers the southwestern of the Lesser Caucasus. Late Pliocene, Quaternary and Basaltic andesite lava outflows are typical for the relief of the highland.

== Kur-Araz lowland ==
The lowland is covered by several sites which differ from one another according to their geological structures and orographic features and surrounded by Greater Caucasus and Lesser Caucasus Ridges. In the northern part of the Kur-Araz lowland Ganykh-Airichay synclinal valley extends and in the south of the valley covered by low-rise linearly monoclinic ridges Jeiranchel-Ajinour terrain. Miocene and Upper Pliocene argillo-arenaceous rocks are typical for the relief of terrain. The eastern part of the Jeiranchel-Ajinour terrain covered by rivers and they create antecedent valleys by crossing the low-hill.

The lowland is divided into the Shirvan, Garabagh, Mughan, Mil and Salyan plains by the Kur and Araz river valleys. In the eastern part of the Kur-Araz lowland covered by the Large and Small Kharami, Mishovdagh. Between the southeastern lowland and Caspian seashore alluvial marine plain Shirvan is situated. The Kur-Araz lowland joins to the Lankaran lowland by the Mughan and Salyan plains in the south. Several elevations such as, "gobu", topographic shapes "chala" as well as river-formed lakes called "akhmaz" are typical for the lowland.

== Talysh Mountains ==
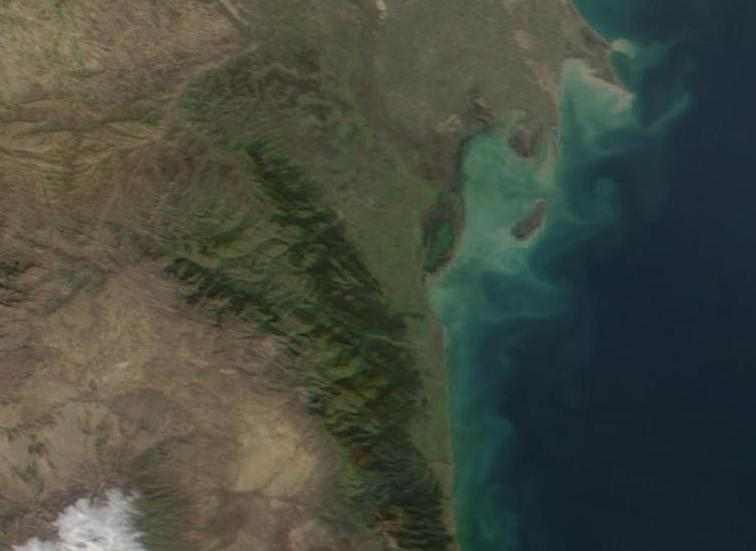
Talysh Mountains

The Talysh Mountains are considered a continuation of the Lesser Caucasus and followed by Paleogene and Neogene volcanic deposits. Furthermore, the southeastern part of the mountains composed of the Late Cretaceous deposits. Compared with the Greater and Lesser Caucasus glacial landforms are not particular in Talysh Mountains. The prominent ridges in Talysh Mountains are Talysh, Peshtasar, Dizgoni, and Burovar Ridges. The highest point is Kemyurkei Mountain with 2,493 meters situated in Talysh Ridge. Northwest section composed of the middle and upper Miocene deposits.

Between the Caspian Sea and Talysh Mountains is situated the Lankaran depression and the flat lowland seaside is below the sea level. The lowland consists of the river descending sediments.
