= Aşralar =

- Location within Azerbaijan
- Coordinates: 40°45′N 45°40′E
- Country: Azerbaijan
- Rayon: Tovuz
- Municipality: İsakənd
- Time zone: UTC+4 (AZT)
  - Summer (DST): UTC+5 (AZT)

Aşralar (also, Ashralar) is a village in the Tovuz Rayon of Azerbaijan. The village forms part of the municipality of İsakənd.
