= Yenikənd, Siazan =

Yenikənd
- Municipality
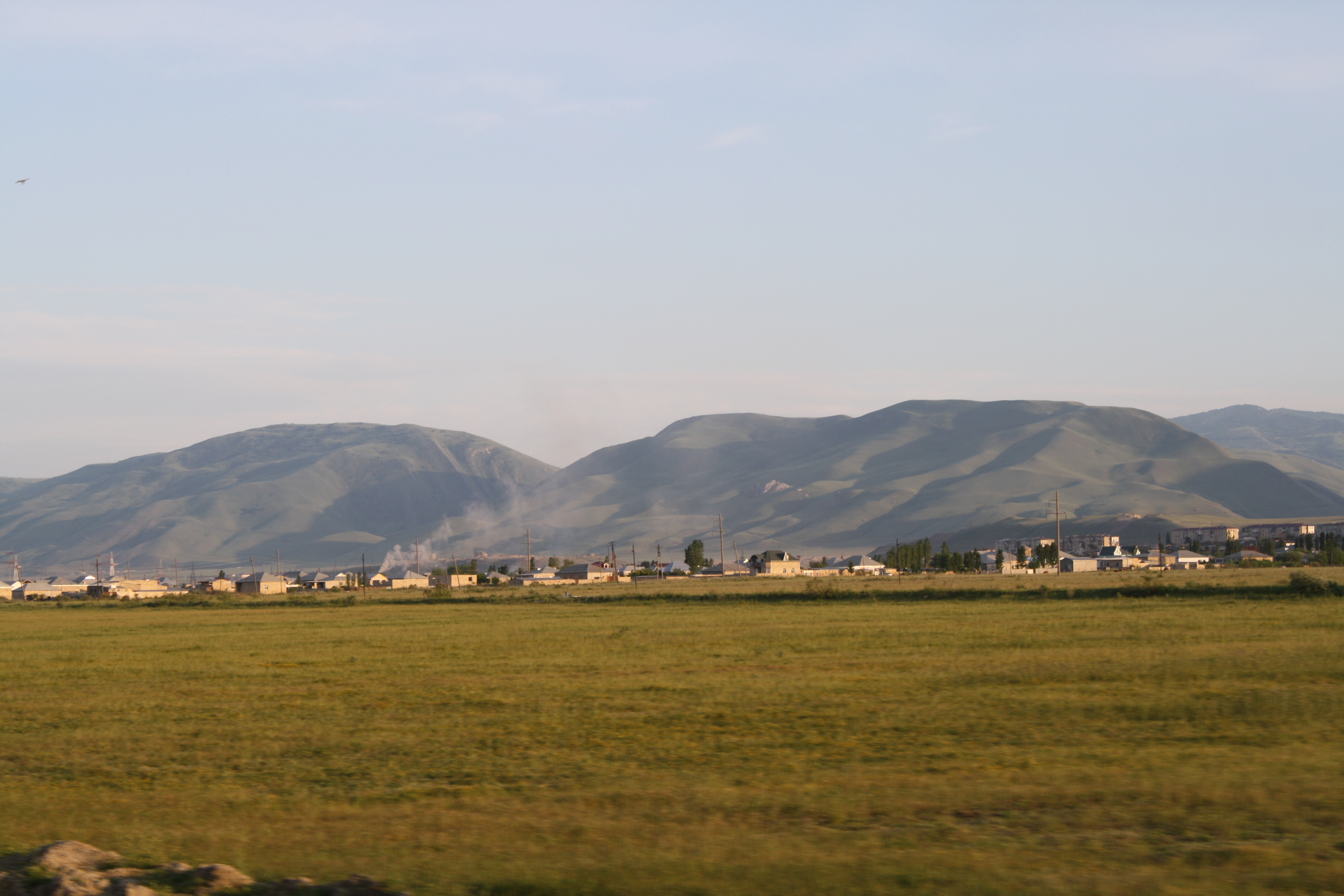

- Location within Azerbaijan
- Coordinates: 41°09′54″N 49°05′12″E
- Country: Azerbaijan
- Rayon: Siazan

Population
  - Total: 2,899
- Time zone: UTC+4 (AZT)
  - Summer (DST): UTC+5 (AZT)

Yenikənd (also, Yenikend) is a village and the most populous municipality, except for the capital Siyəzən, in the Siazan Rayon of Azerbaijan. It has a population of 2,899. The municipality consists of the villages of Yenikənd and Kolanı.

The Long Wall of Apzut Kawat, a 20-kilometer long Sassanid defensive wall, passes through the village.
