= Kamangar Kola =

Kamangar Kola (Persian: كمانگركلا) may refer to:

- Kamangar Kola, Amol
- Kamangar Kola, Dabudasht, Amol County
- Kamangar Kola, Qaem Shahr
