= Shuyesheh =

City in Kurdistan province, Iran

Shuyesheh Persian: شويشه
- City
- Location within Iran Location within Iran Kurdistan
- Coordinates: 35°21′24″N 46°40′42″E
- Country: Iran
- Province: Kurdistan
- County: Sanandaj
- District: Kalatrazan

Population (2016)
  - Total: 1,302
- Time zone: UTC+3:30 (IRST)

Shuyesheh (Persian: شويشه) (Note: Also romanized as Shavīsheh, Shevīsheh, and Shūyesheh) is a city in, and the capital of, Kalatrazan District of Sanandaj County, Kurdistan province, Iran. It also serves as the administrative center for Kalatrazan Rural District. The previous capital of the rural district was the village of Negel.

== Demographics ==
=== Ethnicity ===
The city is populated by Kurds.

=== Population ===
At the time of the 2006 National Census, the city's population was 1,136 in 280 households. The following census in 2011 counted 1,293 people in 330 households. The 2016 census measured the population of the city as 1,302 people in 390 households.
