= Tudar-e Samadi =

Tudar-e Samadi تودارصمدي
- Village
- Location within Iran
- Coordinates: 35°27′27″N 46°49′07″E
- Country: Iran
- Province: Kurdistan
- County: Sanandaj
- Bakhsh: Central
- Rural District: Sarab Qamish

Population (2006)
  - Total: 442
- Time zone: UTC+3:30 (IRST)
  - Summer (DST): UTC+4:30 (IRDT)

Tudar-e Samadi (Persian: تودارصمدي, also Romanized as Tūdār-e Şamadī; also known as Tū’ī Dar Samadī and Tu Yi Dar Samdi) is a village in Sarab Qamish Rural District, in the Central District of Sanandaj County, Kurdistan Province, Iran. At the 2006 census, its population was 442, in 92 families. The village is populated by Kurds.
