= Yarımca, Aghdara =

Yarımca
- Location within Azerbaijan Location within Karabakh Economic Region
- Coordinates: 40°14′01.7″N 46°58′55.0″E
- Country: Azerbaijan
- District: Aghdara
- Time zone: UTC+4 (AZT)

Yarımca (Yarimja) is a ghost village in the Aghdara District of Azerbaijan. It was controlled by the separatist Republic of Artsakh until the end of September 2023.
