= Kolanı, Salyan =

Kolanı
- Location within Azerbaijan
- Coordinates: 39°47′N 48°56′E
- Country: Azerbaijan
- Rayon: Salyan
- Municipality: Qarabağlı
- Time zone: UTC+4 (AZT)
  - Summer (DST): UTC+5 (AZT)

Kolanı (also, Kolany and Gashim-Khanly) is a village in the Salyan Rayon of Azerbaijan. The village forms part of the municipality of Qarabağlı.
