= Kolanı, Yevlakh =

Kolanı
- Village
- Location within Azerbaijan
- Coordinates: 40°29′21″N 47°06′19″E
- Country: Azerbaijan
- Rayon: Yevlakh
- Time zone: UTC+4 (AZT)
  - Summer (DST): UTC+5 (AZT)

Kolanı (also known as Kelanly) is a village in the municipality of Kövər in the Yevlakh Rayon of Azerbaijan.
