= Tidar, Bashagard =

Tidar تيدر
- Village
- Location within Iran
- Coordinates: 26°39′16″N 57°54′53″E
- Country: Iran
- Province: Hormozgan
- County: Bashagard
- Bakhsh: Gowharan
- Rural District: Gowharan

Population (2006)
  - Total: 306
- Time zone: UTC+3:30 (IRST)
  - Summer (DST): UTC+4:30 (IRDT)

Tidar (Persian: تيدر, also Romanized as Tīdar) is a village in Gowharan Rural District, Gowharan District, Bashagard County, Hormozgan Province, Iran. At the 2006 census, its population was 306, in 65 families.
