= Tidar, Lorestan =

Tidar تي دار
- Village
- Location within Iran
- Coordinates: 33°31′47″N 49°12′05″E
- Country: Iran
- Province: Lorestan
- County: Dorud
- Bakhsh: Central
- Rural District: Heshmatabad

Population (2006)
  - Total: 63
- Time zone: UTC+3:30 (IRST)
  - Summer (DST): UTC+4:30 (IRDT)

Tidar (Persian: تي دار, also Romanized as Tīdār; also known as Tūtdār and Tūdār) is a village in Heshmatabad Rural District, in the Central District of Dorud County, Lorestan Province, Iran. At the 2006 census, its population was 63, in 16 families.
