= Kolanı, Hajigabul =

Kolanı
- Municipality
- Location within Azerbaijan
- Coordinates: 40°04′59″N 48°42′15″E
- Country: Azerbaijan
- Rayon: Hajigabul

Population
  - Total: 1,944
- Time zone: UTC+4 (AZT)
  - Summer (DST): UTC+5 (AZT)

Kolanı (also, Kelany-Turany, Kolany, and Kolany-Turuny) is a village and municipality in the Hajigabul Rayon of Azerbaijan. It has a population of 1,944.
