= Kamangar (surname) =

Kamangar (Persian: کمانگر) is an Iranian surname that may refer to the following notable people:

- Farzad Kamangar (c.1978–2010), Iranian Kurdish teacher
- Salar Kamangar (born 1977), Iranian-American senior executive at Google
- Sedigh Kamangar (1946–1989), Iranian Kurdish politician
- Tara Kamangar, American classical pianist and composer
