= Giləzi, Khizi =

Giləzi
- Municipality
- Location within Azerbaijan
- Coordinates: 40°52′04″N 49°20′26″E
- Country: Azerbaijan
- Rayon: Khizi

Population (2008)
  - Total: 3,530
- Time zone: UTC+4 (AZT)
  - Summer (DST): UTC+5 (AZT)

Giləzi (Tat: Güləzi) is a village and the most populous municipality in the Khizi Rayon of Azerbaijan. It has a population of 3,530.
