= Kolanı, Siazan =

Kolanı
- Location within Azerbaijan
- Coordinates: 41°10′52″N 49°07′32″E
- Country: Azerbaijan
- Rayon: Siazan
- Municipality: Yenikənd
- Time zone: UTC+4 (AZT)
  - Summer (DST): UTC+5 (AZT)

Kolanı (also, Kelan’, Kelany, and Kolany) is a village in the Siazan Rayon of Azerbaijan. The village forms part of the municipality of Yenikənd.
