= Karadere Dam =

Coordinates: 41.5767°N 34.0800°E

- Location: Turkey
- Construction began: October 20, 1993
- Opening date: November 25, 2007

Karadere Dam is a dam in Kastamonu Province, Turkey, built between 1993 and 2007. The development was backed by the Turkish State Hydraulic Works. Karadere Dam is built for irrigation purposes and can be found between Kastamonu and Taşköprü. The scope of work includes 1,500,000 cubic metres (53,000,000 cu ft) of excavation and 3,000,000 m^{3} (110,000,000 cu ft) of fill. It has a 497-metre (1,631 ft) long diversion tunnel which is 3.5 metres (11 ft) in diameter.

Karadere is an embankment dam; it is earth-filled with a clay-core. It has a crest that is 309 m (1,014 ft) long and 90 m (300 ft) high from the foundation level.

== See also ==
- List of dams and reservoirs in Turkey
