= Kamangars =

Muslim community in India and Pakistan

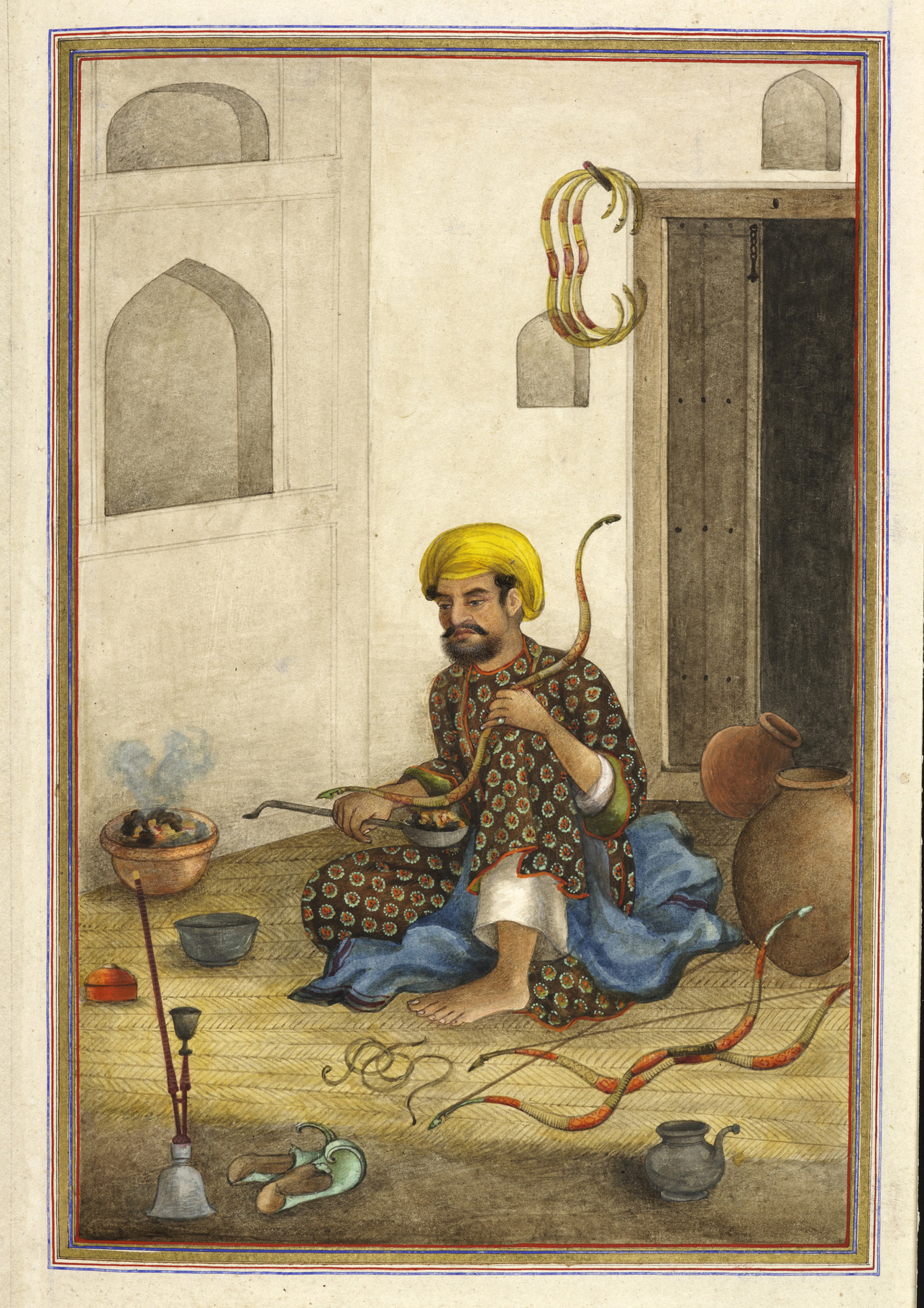
Kamangar, a bowmaker – Tashrih al-aqvam (1825)

The Kamangars are a Muslim community found in Northern India and Pakistan. They are also referred to as the Muslim bow-makers from the Sind.

Human Rights activist, Farzad Kamangar, who was executed in May 2010 belongs to Kamangar community.

The Kamangari Bhint art from Kutch is also famous and is one of the specialities of the community.

== See also ==
- Farzad Kamangar
