= Giləzi, Siazan =

Giləzi
- Location within Azerbaijan
- Coordinates: 40°54′18″N 49°20′11″E
- Country: Azerbaijan
- Rayon: Siazan
- Time zone: UTC+4 (AZT)
  - Summer (DST): UTC+5 (AZT)

Giləzi is a village in the Siazan Rayon of Azerbaijan.
