= Ağdərə, Khizi =

Ağdərə
- Municipality
- Location within Azerbaijan
- Coordinates: 40°41′28″N 49°01′03″E
- Country: Azerbaijan
- Rayon: Khizi

Population
  - Total: 241
- Time zone: UTC+4 (AZT)
  - Summer (DST): UTC+5 (AZT)

Ağdərə (also, Agdara, Agdere, and Akdere) is a village and municipality in the Khizi Rayon of Azerbaijan. It has a population of 241. The municipality consists of the villages of Ağdərə, Qasımkənd, Əmbizlər, and Tudar.

== Geography ==
The village of Ağdərə is located in the southernmost part of the Khizi district in Azerbaijan, 100 kilometers from Baku. There is the Jangi settlement 60 kilometers along the Baku-Shamakhi road. From there, it is 37 kilometers to Ağdərə.

A river flows through the village, which is full of water in the spring and dries up at the end of summer. The river flows into the Caspian Sea from the northern part of Sumqayit city and is called the Sumqayitchay. The residents of Ağdərə call this river Chigilchay.

Due to the lack of greenery, the soil turns to dust in the summer. When a slight wind blows, the village is enveloped in a dense dust cloud.

The village is located in a valley. Surrounded by mountains on all sides except the south, this village has its own unique microclimate.

== Population ==
This village, which always had a large population, is now almost empty and becoming more deserted each year. The residents lived in single-story houses with barns around them for keeping livestock.

=== Famous people ===
- Azerbaijani wrestlers Namig Abdullayev and his brother Arif Abdullayev

== Education ==
The school built in the 1970s consisted of only five rooms.

== Religion ==
Until 1918, there was a mosque by the roadside in the southern part of the village. In that year, the Armenians burned down the mosque with the intention of occupying the village and destroying its population. However, the brave residents of Ağdərə drove away the uninvited guests with weapons and pitchforks. Although the mosque was later restored, it was closed during the Soviet era and used as a grain warehouse.

== Agriculture ==
The village was formerly covered with fruit trees and gardens. It was especially famous for its peaches and apricots. Along the right bank of the river, there were vegetable gardens and plots of land belonging to the villagers.
