= Qarabağlılar =

Village in Tovuz District, Azerbaijan

Coordinates: 40°44′N 45°40′E

Qarabağlılar (also, Garabaghlylar) is a village in the municipality of İsakənd in the Tovuz District of Azerbaijan.
