= Qarabağ, Fuzuli =

Qarabağ
- Location within Azerbaijan Location within Karabakh Economic Region
- Coordinates: 39°35′09.6″N 47°32′28.4″E
- Country: Azerbaijan
- District: Fuzuli
- Time zone: UTC+4 (AZT)
  - Summer (DST): UTC+5 (AZT)

Qarabağ (Qarabagh) is a village in the Fuzuli District of Azerbaijan.
