= Kasymkend, Khachmaz =

Kasymkend
- Location within Azerbaijan
- Coordinates: 41°46′21″N 48°40′08″E
- Country: Azerbaijan
- Rayon: Khachmaz
- Time zone: UTC+4 (AZT)
  - Summer (DST): UTC+5 (AZT)

Kasymkend is a village in the Khachmaz Rayon of Azerbaijan.
