= Kövər =

Village in Azerbaijan

Coordinates: 40°30′N 47°07′E

Kövər is a village and municipality in the Yevlakh Rayon of Azerbaijan. It has a population of 2,423. The municipality consists of the villages of Kövər and Kolanı.
