= Altıağac =

- Municipality
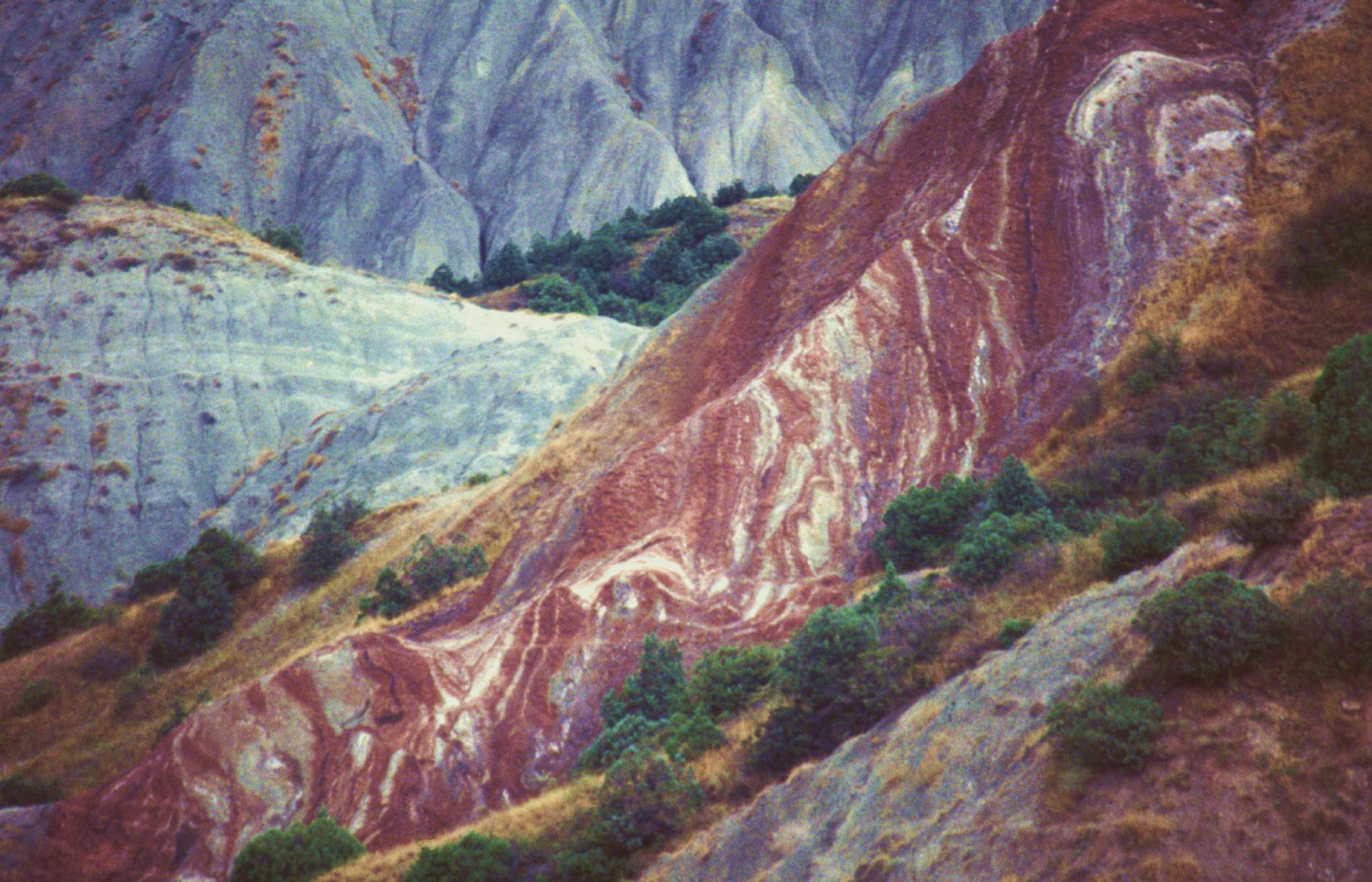

- Location within Azerbaijan
- Coordinates: 40°51′29″N 48°56′10″E
- Country: Azerbaijan
- Rayon: Khizi

Population
  - Total: 1,180
- Time zone: UTC+4 (AZT)
  - Summer (DST): UTC+5 (AZT)

Altıağac (also, Altiagach, Altyagach, Alty-Agatsch, Altiaghach, and Alyagach) is a village and municipality in the Khizi Rayon of Azerbaijan. It has a population of 1,180. The municipality consists of the villages of Altıağac, Qızılqazma, Çisti Klyuç, and Yarımca.
