= Qarabağlı, Samukh =

Qarabağlı
- Municipality
- Location within Azerbaijan
- Coordinates: 41°08′11″N 46°17′01″E
- Country: Azerbaijan
- Rayon: Samukh

Population
  - Total: 652
- Time zone: UTC+4 (AZT)
  - Summer (DST): UTC+5 (AZT)

Qarabağlı (also, Karabagly) is a village and municipality in the Samukh Rayon of Azerbaijan. It has a population of 652.
