= Qarabağlar, Shamkir =

Garabaghlar (Azerbaijani: Qarabağlar) is a village and municipality in the Shamkir District of Azerbaijan. It has a population of 377. The municipality consists of the villages of Garabaghlar and Barlybagh.
