= Qarabağlar, Samukh =

Garabaghlar
- Municipality
- Azerbaijani: Qarabağlar
- Location within Azerbaijan
- Coordinates: 40°45′16″N 46°27′40″E
- Country: Azerbaijan
- District: Samukh

Population
  - Total: 1,495
- Time zone: UTC+4 (AZT)
  - Summer (DST): UTC+5 (AZT)

Qarabağlar (also, Garabaghlar) is a village and municipality in the Samukh District of Azerbaijan. It has a population of 1,495.
