= Qarabağlı, Agsu =

Qarabağlı
- Municipality
- Location within Azerbaijan
- Coordinates: 40°31′01″N 48°22′36″E
- Country: Azerbaijan
- Rayon: Agsu

Population
  - Total: 222
- Time zone: UTC+4 (AZT)
  - Summer (DST): UTC+5 (AZT)

Qarabağlı (also, Kalabegla, Karabagly, Kalabegli, and Kalabekly) is a village and municipality in the Agsu Rayon of Azerbaijan. It has a population of 222.
