= Ağdərə, Tovuz =

Ağdərə
- Location within Azerbaijan
- Coordinates: 40°44′N 45°39′E
- Country: Azerbaijan
- District: Tovuz
- Municipality: İsakənd
- Time zone: UTC+4 (AZT)
  - Summer (DST): UTC+5 (AZT)

Ağdərə (also, Aghdere) is a village in the Tovuz District of Azerbaijan. The village forms part of the municipality of İsakənd.
