= Qarabağlar, Goychay =

Garabaghlar
- Azerbaijani: Qarabağlar
- Location within Azerbaijan
- Coordinates: 40°38′10″N 47°41′37″E
- Country: Azerbaijan
- District: Goychay
- Time zone: UTC+4 (AZT)
  - Summer (DST): UTC+5 (AZT)

Qarabağlar (also, Garabaghlar) is a village in the Goychay District of Azerbaijan. It forms part of the municipality of Şəhadət.
