= Qarabağlı, Şabran =

Qarabağlı
- Location within Azerbaijan
- Coordinates: 41°08′41″N 48°58′05″E
- Country: Azerbaijan
- Rayon: Davachi

Population
  - Total: 0
- Time zone: UTC+4 (AZT)
  - Summer (DST): UTC+5 (AZT)

Qarabağlı is a former village in the Şabran Rayon of Azerbaijan.
