= Ağdərə, Ordubad =

Ağdərə
- Municipality
- Location within Azerbaijan
- Coordinates: 39°06′37″N 45°54′50″E
- Country: Azerbaijan
- Autonomous republic: Nakhchivan
- District: Ordubad
- Time zone: UTC+4 (AZT)

Ağdərə (also, Aghdara and Agdere) is a settlement in the Ordubad District of Nakhchivan, Azerbaijan. It is included to the administrative-territorial scope of the Paraghachay settlement. It is located in the right side of the Ordubad-Bist highway, 48 km in the north-east from the district center, on the left bank of the Gilanchay river. At the present, nobody lives in the settlement.

== History ==
The settlement was founded in 1950, due to establishing the plant of ore refining in the territory of named Ağdərə. The surrounding slopes are from the white colored rocks. Therefore, settlement got its name from the valley with the same-titled.
