= Qarabağlı, Salyan =

Qarabağlı
- Municipality
- Location within Azerbaijan
- Coordinates: 39°46′17″N 48°58′06″E
- Country: Azerbaijan
- Rayon: Salyan

Population
  - Total: 5,377
- Time zone: UTC+4 (AZT)
  - Summer (DST): UTC+5 (AZT)

Qarabağlı (also, Karabagly) is a village and municipality in the Salyan Rayon of Azerbaijan. It has a population of 5,377. The municipality consists of the villages of Qarabağlı and Kolanı.
