= Qarabağlar, Nakhchivan =

Qarabağlar
- Municipality
- Location within Azerbaijan
- Coordinates: 39°25′31″N 45°11′49″E
- Country: Azerbaijan
- Autonomous republic: Nakhchivan
- District: Kangarli

Population
  - Total: 1,143
- Time zone: UTC+4 (AZT)

Qarabağlar (Garabaghlar or Karabakhlar) is a village and the most populous municipality in the Kangarli District of Nakhchivan, Azerbaijan. It has a population of 1,143.
