= Kalani Das =

American musician

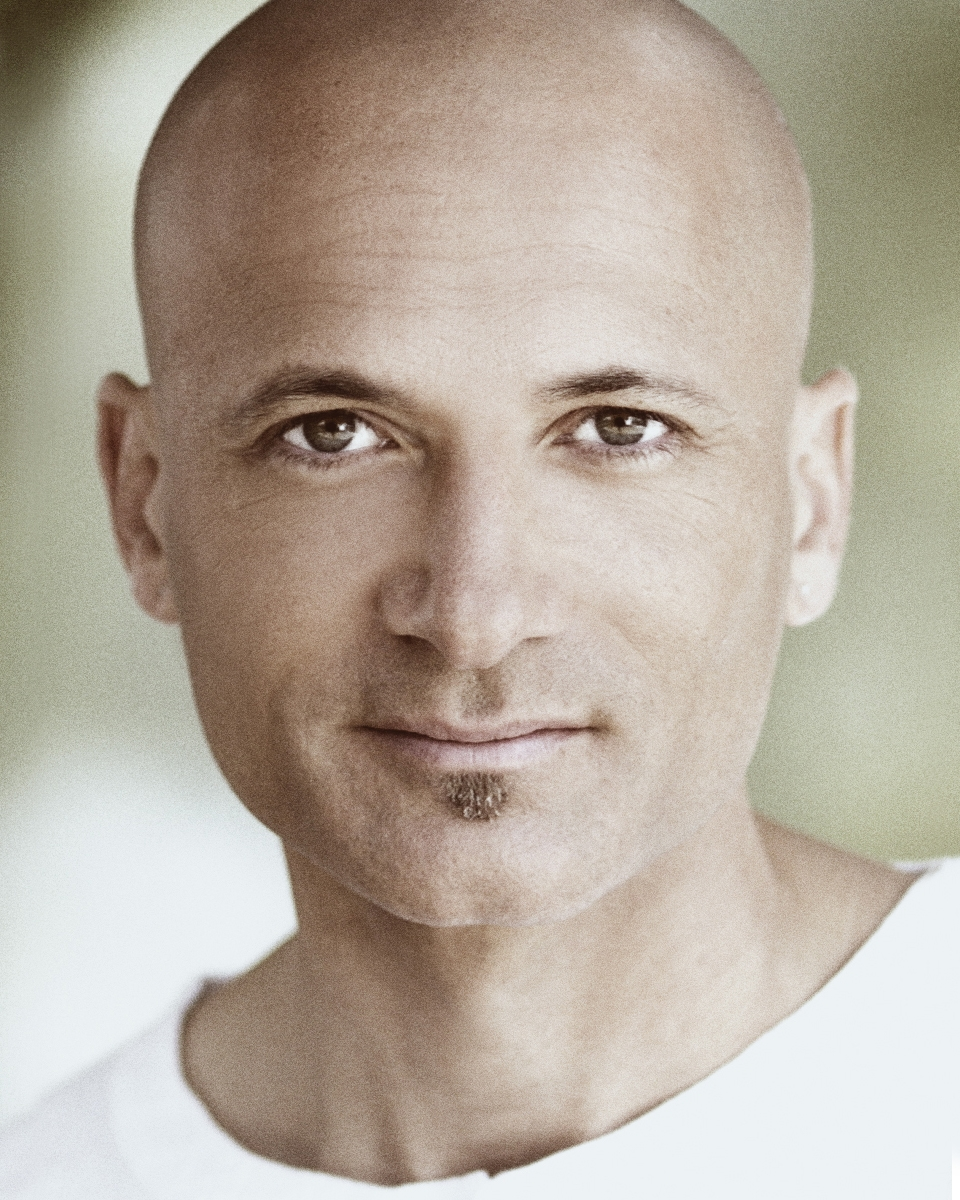

Background information
- Occupations: Percussionist; Music Therapist; Educator
- Instrument: percussion
- Website: KalaniMusic.com

Kalani Das, also known simply as Kalani (birth name Michael Bruno), is an American classically trained percussionist, author, and educator. He has recorded percussion with numerous artists including Yanni and Suzanne Ciani, and has won several awards, including #1 Rock/Pop Percussionist through DRUM! Magazine. He has published several instructional books and DVDs, teaching a variety of percussion instruments, including hand drums and small percussion.

== History ==
Kalani Das received two Bachelor of Music degrees from California State University Northridge, one in percussion performance (1986) and another in Music Therapy (2010). He has received seven awards from DRUM! Magazine for his work as a performing artist, author, percussion clinician, and group drumming leader.

He has toured and/or recorded with such artists as Kenny Loggins, David Sanborn, Max Roach, Barry Manilow, Vic Damone, John Mayall, Chante Moore, Dr. John, Michael Kamen, and Melissa Manchester, and Benise. Kalani has completed five major concert tours with Yanni including the "Reflections of Passion", "Revolution in Sound", "Dare to Dream", "Yanni Live, The Symphony Concerts 1993 and 1994" concert tours and is the featured percussionist on the multi-platinum concert film Live at the Acropolis. He has performed on numerous other live recordings including Suzanne Ciani and The Wave, and Benise's Nights of Fire. Kalani is also featured on recordings for Disney, Warner Bros. Records, Tri-Star Pictures, Paramount Studios, The Nature Company, and Jim Henson Records.

Kalani has authored several books for Alfred Publishing, two of which, Together in Rhythm and The Amazing Jamnasium, have been honored with peer-reviewed iParenting Awards. He has also released instructional DVDs to include methods for congas, bongos, and djembe.

== Discography ==
- Pangea
- Insights
- Murumba
- "Rhythm Spirit"

== Videography ==
- Kalani's Ultimate Djembe Jam
- Kalani's Ultimate Conga Jam
- Kalani's Ultimate Bongo Jam

== Bibliography ==
- Das, K. 2011. The Way of Music: Creating Sounds Connections in Music Therapy. Sarsen Publishing. ISBN 978-1607252788.
- Kalani. 2002. All About Jembe. Alfred Music. ISBN 978-0739023600.
- Kalani. 2003. All About Bongos. Alfred Music. ISBN 978-0739033869.
- Kalani. 2003. All About Congas. Alfred Music. ISBN 978-0739033494.
- Kalani. 2004. Together in Rhythm: A Facilitator's Guide to Drum Circle Music. Alfred Music. ISBN 978-0739035108.
- Kalani. 2004. The Amazing Jamnasium. Alfred Music. ISBN 978-0739036259.
- Kalani and Camera R. 2007. West African Drum & Dance: A Yankadi-Macrou Celebration- Teacher's Guide. Alfred Music. ISBN 978-0739038697.
- Kalani. 2008. All About Hand Percussion. Alfred Music. ISBN 978-0739049648.
- Kalani. 2009. Recorders in Rhythm ~ Caribbean!: A Spicy Blend for the Latin Percussion Ensemble. Alfred Music. ISBN 978-0739062449.
