= Qarabağlı, Khachmaz =

Qarabağlı
- Municipality
- Location within Azerbaijan
- Coordinates: 41°29′15″N 48°52′23″E
- Country: Azerbaijan
- Rayon: Khachmaz

Population
  - Total: 409
- Time zone: UTC+4 (AZT)
  - Summer (DST): UTC+5 (AZT)

Qarabağlı (also, Karabagly) is a village and municipality in the Khachmaz Rayon of Azerbaijan. It has a population of 409.
