= Negel Rural District =

Rural district in Kurdistan province, Iran

Negel Rural District Persian: دهستان نگل
- Rural District
- Location within Iran Location within Iran Kurdistan
- Coordinates: 35°17′29″N 46°32′34″E
- Country: Iran
- Province: Kurdistan
- County: Sanandaj
- District: Kalatrazan
- Capital: Negel

Population (2016)
  - Total: 6,194
- Time zone: UTC+3:30 (IRST)

Negel Rural District (Persian: دهستان نگل) is in Kalatrazan District of Sanandaj County, Kurdistan province, Iran. Its capital is the village of Negel.

== Demographics ==
=== Ethicity ===
The district is largely populated by ethnic Kurds.

=== Population ===
At the time of the 2006 National Census, the rural district's population was 6,739 in 1,679 households. There were 7,112 inhabitants in 1,962 households at the following census of 2011. The 2016 census measured the population of the rural district as 6,194 in 1,873 households. The most populous of its 13 villages was Negel, with 1,719 people.
