= Zhavarud-e Gharbi Rural District =

Rural district in Kurdistan province, Iran

Zhavarud-e Gharbi Rural District Persian: دهستان ژاورود غربي
- Rural District
- Location within Iran Location within Iran Kurdistan
- Coordinates: 35°14′54″N 46°39′00″E
- Country: Iran
- Province: Kurdistan
- County: Sanandaj
- District: Kalatrazan
- Capital: Avihang

Population (2016)
  - Total: 5,021
- Time zone: UTC+3:30 (IRST)

Zhavarud-e Gharbi Rural District (Persian: دهستان ژاورود غربي) is in Kalatrazan District of Sanandaj County, Kurdistan province, Iran. Its capital is the village of Avihang.

== Demographics ==
=== Population ===
At the time of the 2006 National Census, the rural district's population was 6,819 in 1,696 households. There were 5,781 inhabitants in 1,658 households at the following census of 2011. The 2016 census measured the population of the rural district as 5,021 in 1,543 households. The most populous of its 12 villages was Avihang, with 1,372 people.
