= Kalatrazan Rural District =

Rural district in Kurdistan province, Iran

Kalatrazan Rural District Persian: دهستان كلاترزان
- Rural District
- Location within Iran Location within Iran Kurdistan
- Coordinates: 35°25′06″N 46°40′45″E
- Country: Iran
- Province: Kurdistan
- County: Sanandaj
- District: Kalatrazan
- Capital: Shuyesheh

Population (2016)
  - Total: 6,854
- Time zone: UTC+3:30 (IRST)

Kalatrazan Rural District (Persian: دهستان كلاترزان) is in Kalatrazan District of Sanandaj County, Kurdistan province, Iran. It is administered from the city of Shuyesheh. The previous capital of the rural district was the village of Negel.

== Demographics ==
=== Population ===
At the time of the 2006 National Census, the rural district's population was 8,196 in 1,900 households. There were 7,371 inhabitants in 1,943 households at the following census of 2011. The 2016 census measured the population of the rural district as 6,854 in 1,982 households. The most populous of its 25 villages was Isaabad, with 1,036 people.
