= Kalatrazan District =

District in Kurdistan province, Iran

Kalatrazan District Persian: بخش کلاترزان
- District
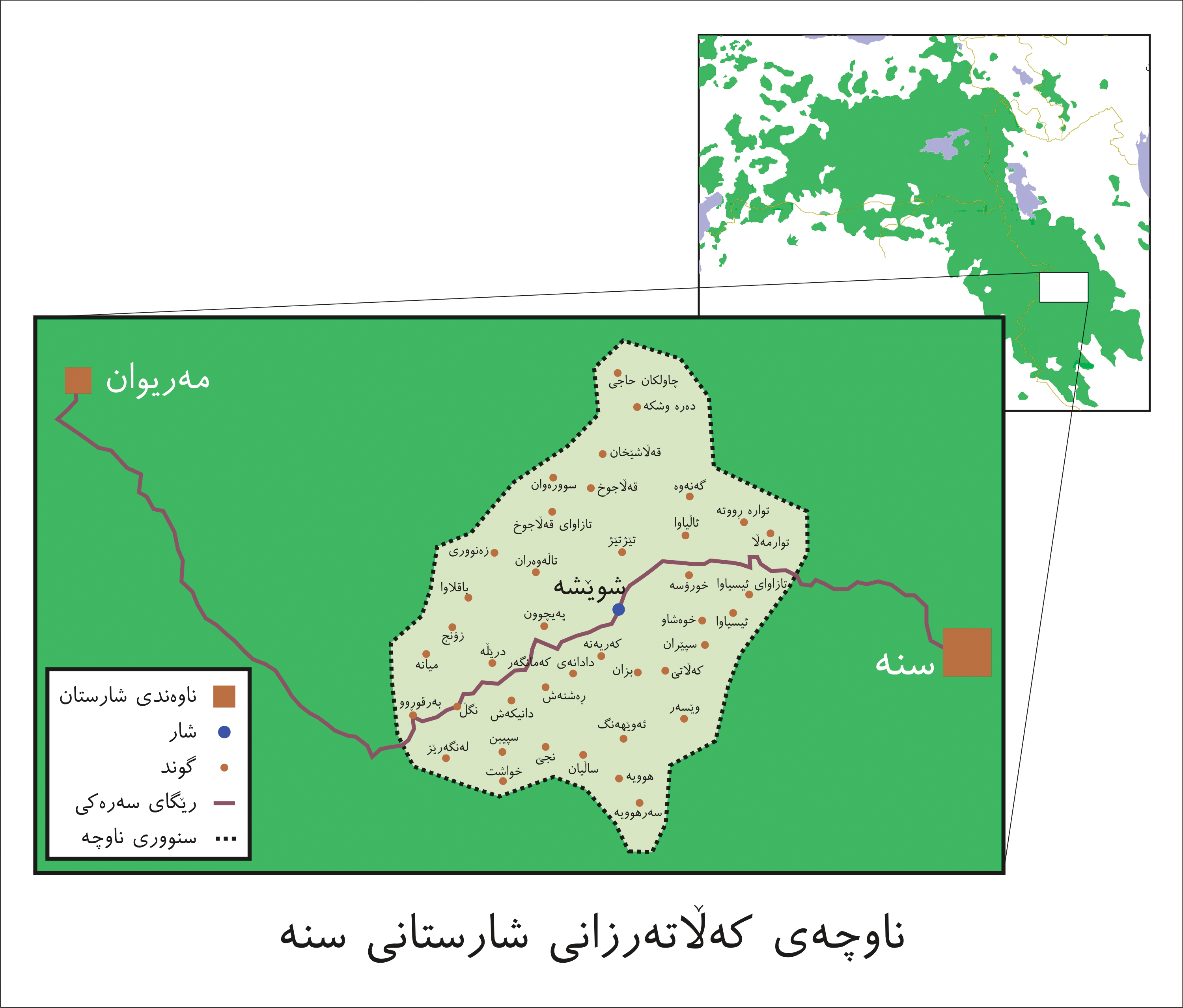
- Kalatrazan District

- Location within Iran Location within Iran Kurdistan
- Coordinates: 35°21′34″N 46°38′08″E
- Country: Iran
- Province: Kurdistan
- County: Sanandaj
- Capital: Shuyesheh

Population (2016)
  - Total: 19,371
- Time zone: UTC+3:30 (IRST)

Kalatrazan District (Persian: بخش کلاترزان) is in Sanandaj County, Kurdistan province, Iran. Its capital is the city of Shuyesheh.

== Demographics ==
=== Population ===
At the time of the 2006 National Census, the district's population was 22,890 in 5,555 households. The following census in 2011 counted 21,557 people in 5,893 households. The 2016 census measured the population of the district as 19,371 inhabitants in 5,788 households.

=== Administrative divisions ===
Kalatrazan District Population
Administrative Divisions	2006	2011	2016
Kalatrazan RD	8,196	7,371	6,854
Negel RD	6,739	7,112	6,194
Zhavarud-e Gharbi RD	6,819	5,781	5,021
Shuyesheh (city)	1,136	1,293	1,302
Total	22,890	21,557	19,371
RD = Rural District
