= Khizi District =

District in eastern Azerbaijan

Coordinates: 40°54′N 49°04′E

- District
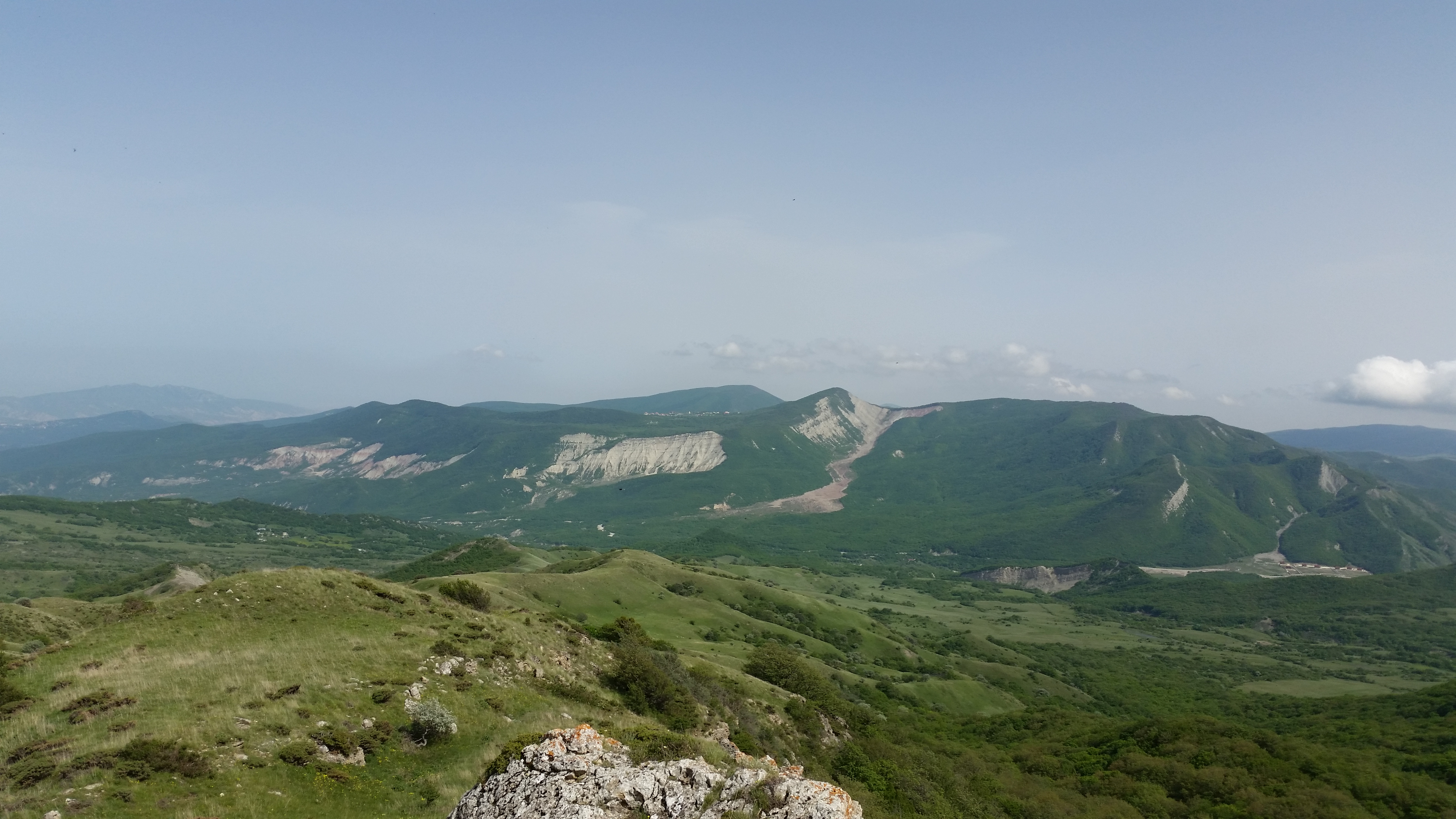

- Map of Azerbaijan showing Khizi District
- Country: Azerbaijan
- Economic regions of Azerbaijan: Absheron-Khizi
- Region: Europe
- Established: 24 April 1990
- Capital: Khizi
- Settlements: 29

Government
  - Governor: Khazar Aslanov

Area
  - Total: 1,670 km^{2} (640 sq mi)

Population (2020)
  - Total: 17,100
  - Density: 10.2/km^{2} (26.5/sq mi)
- Time zone: UTC+4 (AZT)
- Postal code: 8000
- Website: www.khizi-ih.gov.az

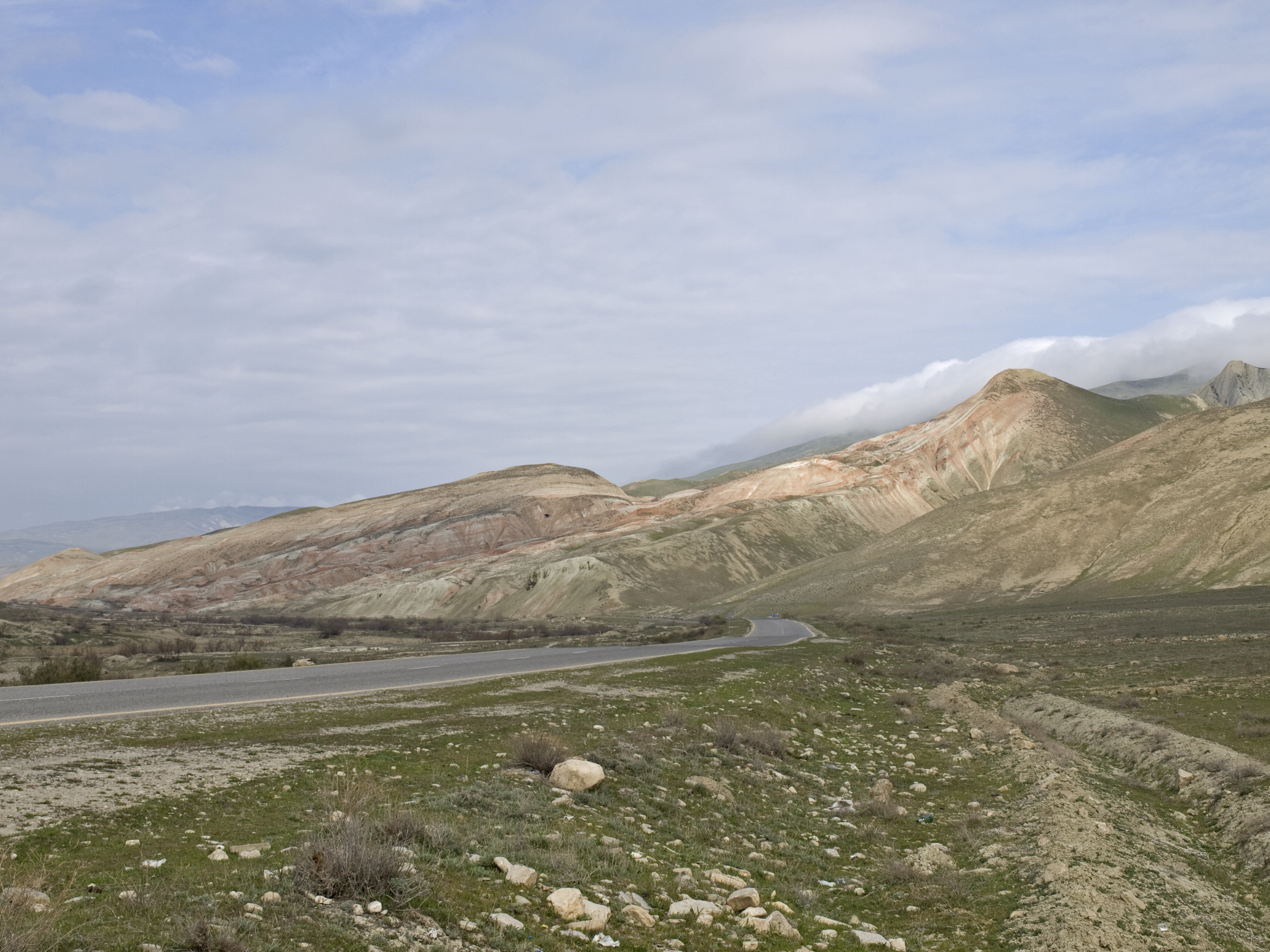
Candy Cane Mountains in Khizi District

Khizi District (Azerbaijani: Xızı rayonu) is one of the 67 districts of Azerbaijan. Its position in the eastern part of the country puts it within the borders of Europe and within the Absheron-Khizi Economic Region. It shares borders with the districts of Siyazan, Shabran, Quba, Shamakhi, Gobustan, and Absheron-Khizi. Its capital and largest city is Khizi. As of 2020, the district had a population of 17,100, making it the least populated district of Azerbaijan.

== Etymology ==
Azerbaijanis and Tats compose the main ethnic background of Khizi. There are preconceptions about the etymology of the word "Xızı" which was previously used to represent a small village. Many experts assume that this name is from the Sassanid Empire. In the early Middle Ages (3rd–4th centuries), the Iranian tribes were transferred here to spread Zoroastrianism, the official religion of the empire, in the northern territories of the empire, to combat Christianity and protect the northern borders from Hun, Peach, and Khazar tribes. This process further strengthened after the Shirvanshahs were defeated by the Safavids. The tribes who moved here were mainly from Khuzistan. The name was gradually transformed into the form of Khizi in our time.

According to another version, the toponym Khizi is derived from the word "Khazar". From history it is known that for several centuries the Khazars dominated the territories of the Caspian, Black and Baltic seas. As the 8th-century Arab historian Ibn Fadlan writes, the Muslim part of the Turkic-speaking Khazar people was headed by one of the representatives of the Khizi tribe. The Khizi tribe lived in the northern part of Azerbaijan in the 2nd century BC. According to another version, the Turkic word "khyz" - quickly, rapidly, hastily—gave the name of the area.

== Geography ==
The climate of the district is mild, and the air is dry. A large part of the district territory is covered with forests. On the flat Caspian coast there are irrigated cattle and chicken-breeding lowlands around Shurabad. West of Gilazi, the Khizi road climbs through the colorful semi-desert landscapes known as the Candy Cane Mountains. Around 10 km west of Khizi town, the green, heavily forested hills around Alti Agach, which has been declared an Altyaghach National Park. The national park is home to the rare East Caucasian tur, a mountain-dwelling goat antelope found only in the eastern half of the Caucasus Mountains.

The eastern part of the Khizi plateau flows through the Gilazi to the Caspian Sea. Khizi, the center of the district, is 104 kilometres (65 mi) from Baku. The region is surrounded by the Varsat ridge, the Takhtayilak ridge in the north, and the Aladadash ridge to the east.

The main mountains are the Dübrar (2205m), Kemchi (1026m), Sharaku (958m), Beybayim (935m), Shihandag (801m) and Great Siyaku (786m) mountains. The main rivers are the Atachay, Jangichay, Kanda, Tugchay, Dizavarchay, Kerban, and Garabulag rivers. There is Altiagac National Park and Wildlife Rehabilitation Center in the district.

=== Landscape ===
Khizi District is one of the most forested districts of Azerbaijan, with about 9,931 hectares (24,540 acres) or 6% of the district, being converted into forests. The area has rich biodiversity, landscape, and ecosystem diversity. Forests, semi-deserts, steppes, deserts, gray mountains, subalpine, and alpine ecosystems are present in the area. Forest dendroflora consists mainly of Iberian oak, oriental oak, oriental peanut, pine, and juniper. Trees and shrubs such as spruce, pear, hawthorn, and blackberry grow in sparsely wooded forests. The fauna of the area is also rich. Species include European caterpillars, brown bears, pigs, gray rabbits, foxes, and wolves.

The district is famous for the Besh Barmag Mountain. The mountain's name is a reference to the resemblance of the mountain to an open palm. The Candy Cane Mountains are also located in Khizi.

== Historical monuments ==
There is a graveyard dating to 300–500 years in the former Shikhlar village cemetery located near the village of Tikhli. This tomb is likely to be Sheikh Heydar's Tomb (15th century). According to some sources, Sheikh Heydar's tomb is the grave of Sheikh Heydar, the father of Ismayil I, the founder of the Safavid Empire. In 1483 and 1487 he launched two campaigns - in Dagestan and Shirvan, which alarmed all the rulers of the region, including Sultan Yagub. In order to prevent further strengthening of the positions of Sheikh Heydar, Sultan Yagub helped Shirvanshah Farrukh Yasar to resist him. Sheikh Heydar Shirvanshah died in the Battle of Tabasaran (1488) and was buried in the area opposite the sacred Beshbarmak mountain. Later, Ismayil Safavi, who defeated the Shirvanshahs' state, built a tomb on his father's grave, attacked the Shikhlar village, and declared the mausoleum a sacred sanctuary. The tower of Beshbarmag, the remains of the lost city of the 5th century, the mausoleum of Sheikh Heydar, the remains of the fallen stone fence of the tower of Khizi relating to the 5th century, and the 15th-century sanctuary in the village of Khialandzh are all examples of historical monuments.

== Population ==
According to the State Statistics Committee, as of 2018, the population of the city recorded 16,800 persons, which increased by 3,600 persons (about 27 percent) from 13,200 persons in 2000. Of the total population, 8,300 are men and 8,500 are women. More than 25.5 percent of the population (about 4,300 persons) consists of young people and teenagers aged 14–29.

The population of city (at the beginning of the year, thsd. persons)
Region	2000	2001	2002	2003	2004	2005	2006	2007	2008	2009	2010	2011	2012	2013	2014	2015	2016	2017	2018
Khizi region	13,2	13,4	13,6	13,6	13,8	13,9	14,2	14,3	14,5	14,7	14,8	15,1	15,3	15,5	15,8	16,1	16,4	16,6	16,8
urban population	7,0	7,2	7,2	7,2	7,3	7,3	7,3	7,4	7,4	7,4	7,5	7,7	7,7	7,8	8,1	8,3	8,5	8,6	8,7
rural population	6,2	6,2	6,4	6,4	6,5	6,6	6,9	6,9	7,1	7,3	7,3	7,4	7,6	7,7	7,7	7,8	7,9	8,0	8,1
