= Sang Sefid =

Sang-e Sefid or Sang Sefid or Sang-i-Sefid or Sangsefid or Sang-e Safid or Sang-i-Safid (Persian: سنگ سفيد) may refer to:

== Fars Province ==
- Sang-e Sefid, Abadeh Tashk, a village in Neyriz County
- Sang-e Sefid, Qatruyeh, a village in Neyriz County

== Hamadan Province ==
- Sang-e Sefid, Bahar, a village in Bahar County
- Sang-e Sefid-e Nanaj, a village in Malayer County
- Sang-e Sefid, Tuyserkan, a village in Tuyserkan County
- Sang-e Sefid, Qolqol Rud, a village in Tuyserkan County

== Ilam Province ==
- Sang-e Sefid, Ilam, a village in Shirvan and Charadaval County

== Isfahan Province ==
- Sang-e Sefid, Isfahan, a village in Khvansar County

== Kermanshah Province ==
- Sang-e Sefid, Kermanshah, a village in Kermanshah County
- Sang-e Sefid, Sahneh, a village in Sahneh County

== Kurdistan Province ==
- Sang-e Sefid, Kamyaran, a village in Kamyaran County
- Sang Sefid, Hoseynabad-e Jonubi, a village in Sanandaj County
- Sang-e Sefid, Naran, a village in Sanandaj County

== Lorestan Province ==
- Sang-e Sefid, Borborud-e Gharbi, a village in Aligudarz County
- Sang-e Sefid, Borborud-e Sharqi, a village in Aligudarz County
- Sang-e Sefid, Borujerd, a village in Borujerd County

== Markazi Province ==
- Sang-e Sefid, Markazi, a village in Shazand County
- Sang Sefid Rural District, in Khondab County

== Razavi Khorasan Province ==
- Sefid Sang, a city in Razavi Khosrasan Province
- Sang-e Sefid, Chenaran, a village in Chenaran County
- Sang-e Sefid, Sabzevar, a village in Sabzevar County
