= Naran =

Naran may refer to:

== Places ==
=== Iran ===
- Naran, Abidar
- Naran, Hormozgan
- Naran, Jiroft, Kerman Province
- Naran, Kerman, Iran
- Naran, Kurdistan
- Naran Rural District, in Kurdistan Province

=== Mongolia ===
- Naran, Govi-Altai, a district
- Naran, Sükhbaatar, a district

=== Pakistan ===
- Naran, Kaghan Valley, a town located in Kaghan Valley of Mansehra District, Khyber Pakhtunkhwa
- Naran Road, a road near Makra Peak

== People with the given name ==
- Zundui Naran (born 1967), Mongolian cyclist

== People with the surname ==
- Jeshani Naran (born 1988), Indian-born Kenyan former cricketer
- Meera Naran, British road safety campaigner
- Prag Lalloo Naran (1926 – 1981), Zimbabwean politician and businessman

== Other ==
- Naran (film), a 2005 Indian Malayalam-language film
- Naran, an unrealized Indian film starring Kamal Haasan
- Naran Naran Hyper Coupe, a German sports car

== See also ==
- Narin (disambiguation)
