= Galin, Kurdistan =

Village in Kurdistan province, Iran

Galin Persian: گلين
- Village
- Location within Iran Location within Iran Kurdistan
- Coordinates: 35°07′57″N 46°49′01″E
- Country: Iran
- Province: Kurdistan
- County: Sanandaj
- District: Sirvan
- Rural District: Miyanrud

Population (2016)
  - Total: 1,135
- Time zone: UTC+3:30 (IRST)

Galin (Persian: گلين) (Note: Also romanized as Galīn and Golīn; also known as Gailiān, Golshan, and Takyeh-ye Galīn) is a village in Miyanrud Rural District of Sirvan District, Sanandaj County, Kurdistan province, Iran.

== Demographics ==
=== Ethnicity ===
The village is populated by Kurds.

=== Population ===
At the time of the 2006 National Census, the village's population was 1,560 in 389 households, when it was in Zhavarud-e Sharqi Rural District of the Central District. The following census in 2011 counted 1,212 people in 363 households. The 2016 census measured the population of the village as 1,135 people in 344 households, by which time the rural district had been separated from the district in the establishment of Sirvan District. Galin was transferred to Miyanrud Rural District created in the new district. It was the most populous village in its rural district.
