= Bazi Robab =

Bazi Robab بازي رباب
- Village
- Location within Iran
- Coordinates: 35°33′35″N 47°01′36″E
- Country: Iran
- Province: Kurdistan
- County: Sanandaj
- Bakhsh: Central
- Rural District: Hoseynabad-e Jonubi

Population (2006)
  - Total: 249
- Time zone: UTC+3:30 (IRST)
  - Summer (DST): UTC+4:30 (IRDT)

Bazi Robab (Persian: بازي رباب, also Romanized as Bāzī Robāb) is a village in Hoseynabad-e Jonubi Rural District, in the Central District of Sanandaj County, Kurdistan Province, Iran. At the 2006 census, its population was 249, in 56 families. The village is populated by Kurds.
