= Gerizeh =

Gerizeh گريزه
- Village
- Location within Iran
- Coordinates: 35°15′29″N 47°01′07″E
- Country: Iran
- Province: Kurdistan
- County: Sanandaj
- Bakhsh: Central
- Rural District: Howmeh

Population (2006)
  - Total: 1,433
- Time zone: UTC+3:30 (IRST)
  - Summer (DST): UTC+4:30 (IRDT)

Gerizeh (Persian: گريزه, also Romanized as Gerīzeh) is a village in Howmeh Rural District, in the Central District of Sanandaj County, Kurdistan Province, Iran. At the 2006 census, its population was 1,433, in 355 families. The village is populated by Kurds.
