= Karahsi =

Karahsi كره سي
- Village
- Location within Iran
- Coordinates: 35°13′15″N 46°54′07″E
- Country: Iran
- Province: Kurdistan
- County: Sanandaj
- Bakhsh: Central
- Rural District: Abidar

Population (2006)
  - Total: 386
- Time zone: UTC+3:30 (IRST)
  - Summer (DST): UTC+4:30 (IRDT)

Karahsi (Persian: كره سي, also Romanized as Karahsī, Karehsī, and Korrehsī; also known as Karkeseh, Karrahseh, and Korsī) is a village in Abidar Rural District, in the Central District of Sanandaj County, Kurdistan Province, Iran. At the 2006 census, its population was 386, in 102 families. The village is populated by Kurds.
