= Khak Ruzi =

Khak Ruzi خاكروزي
- Village
- Location within Iran
- Coordinates: 35°31′26″N 46°53′05″E
- Country: Iran
- Province: Kurdistan
- County: Sanandaj
- Bakhsh: Central
- Rural District: Sarab Qamish

Population (2006)
  - Total: 78
- Time zone: UTC+3:30 (IRST)
  - Summer (DST): UTC+4:30 (IRDT)

Khak Ruzi (Persian: خاكروزي, also Romanized as Khāk Rūzī; also known as Khākerozī) is a village in Sarab Qamish Rural District, in the Central District of Sanandaj County, Kurdistan Province, Iran. At the 2006 census, its population was 78, in 15 families. The village is populated by Kurds.
