= Mayian Dul =

Mayian Dul مائين دول
- Village
- Location within Iran
- Coordinates: 35°34′39″N 46°50′50″E
- Country: Iran
- Province: Kurdistan
- County: Sanandaj
- Bakhsh: Central
- Rural District: Sarab Qamish

Population (2006)
  - Total: 259
- Time zone: UTC+3:30 (IRST)
  - Summer (DST): UTC+4:30 (IRDT)

Mayian Dul (Persian: مائين دول, also Romanized as Māyīan Dūl; also known as Mādīān Dūl) is a village in Sarab Qamish Rural District, in the Central District of Sanandaj County, Kurdistan Province, Iran. At the 2006 census, its population was 259, in 48 families. The village is populated by Kurds.
