= Isa Dar =

Isa Dar عيسي در
- Village
- Location within Iran
- Coordinates: 35°27′52″N 47°02′27″E
- Country: Iran
- Province: Kurdistan
- County: Sanandaj
- Bakhsh: Central
- Rural District: Howmeh

Population (2006)
  - Total: 64
- Time zone: UTC+3:30 (IRST)
  - Summer (DST): UTC+4:30 (IRDT)

Isa Dar (Persian: عيسي در, also Romanized as ‘Īsá Dar) is a village in Howmeh Rural District, in the Central District of Sanandaj County, Kurdistan Province, Iran. At the 2006 census, its population was 64, in 15 families. The village is populated by Kurds.
