= Turivar =

Village in Kurdistan province, Iran

Turivar Persian: توريور
- Village
- Location within Iran Location within Iran Kurdistan
- Coordinates: 35°11′03″N 46°48′06″E
- Country: Iran
- Province: Kurdistan
- County: Sanandaj
- District: Sirvan
- Rural District: Zhavarud-e Sharqi

Population (2016)
  - Total: 671
- Time zone: UTC+3:30 (IRST)

Turivar (Persian: توريور) (Note: Also romanized as Tāvarīvar, Tavrīvar, Tooryour, and Tūrīvar) is a village in, and the capital of, Zhavarud-e Sharqi Rural District of Sirvan District, Sanandaj County, Kurdistan province, Iran.

== Demographics ==
=== Ethnicity ===
The village is populated by Kurds.

=== Population ===
At the time of the 2006 National Census, the village's population was 767 in 206 households, when it was in the Central District. The following census in 2011 counted 630 people in 215 households. The 2016 census measured the population of the village as 671 people in 239 households, by which time the rural district had been separated from the district in the formation of Sirvan District.
