= Tirgaran =

Tirgaran تيرگران
- Village
- Location within Iran
- Coordinates: 35°26′16″N 47°00′39″E
- Country: Iran
- Province: Kurdistan
- County: Sanandaj
- Bakhsh: Central
- Rural District: Howmeh

Population (2006)
  - Total: 49
- Time zone: UTC+3:30 (IRST)
  - Summer (DST): UTC+4:30 (IRDT)

Tirgaran (Persian: تيرگران, also Romanized as Tīrgarān; also known as Sīrgarān and Thīrgaran) is a village in Howmeh Rural District, in the Central District of Sanandaj County, Kurdistan Province, Iran. At the 2006 census, its population was 49, in 11 families. The village is populated by Kurds.
