= Anbar Bozan =

Marabzan مەرەبزان
- Village
- Location within Iran
- Coordinates: 35°16′38″N 46°54′26″E
- Country: Iran
- Province: Kurdistan
- County: Sanandaj
- Bakhsh: Central
- Rural District: Abidar

Population (2006)
  - Total: 269
- Time zone: UTC+3:30 (IRST)
  - Summer (DST): UTC+4:30 (IRDT)

Marabzan (Kurdish: مەرەبزان, also Romanized as ‘ Marabzab; is a village in Abidar Rural District, in the Central District of Sanandaj County, Kurdistan Province, Iran. At the 2006 census, its population was 269, in 67 families. The village is populated by Kurds.
