= Muyneh =

Muyneh موينه
- Village
- Location within Iran
- Coordinates: 35°08′34″N 47°00′55″E
- Country: Iran
- Province: Kurdistan
- County: Sanandaj
- Bakhsh: Central
- Rural District: Naran

Population (2006)
  - Total: 192
- Time zone: UTC+3:30 (IRST)
  - Summer (DST): UTC+4:30 (IRDT)

Muyneh (Persian: موينه, also Romanized as Mūyneh; also known as Mū’īneh, Mūneh, and Mūnīyeh) is a village in Naran Rural District, in the Central District of Sanandaj County, Kurdistan Province, Iran. At the 2006 census, its population was 192, in 44 families. The village is populated by Kurds.
