= Gazaneh =

Gazaneh or Gazneh (Persian: گزنه) may refer to:

- Gazneh, Kermanshah
- Gazneh, Kurdistan
- Gazaneh, Mazandaran
- Gazaneh, Qazvin
