= Nureh =

Nureh نوره
- Village
- Location within Iran
- Coordinates: 35°18′49″N 46°53′30″E
- Country: Iran
- Province: Kurdistan
- County: Sanandaj
- Bakhsh: Central
- Rural District: Arandan

Population (2006)
  - Total: 776
- Time zone: UTC+3:30 (IRST)
  - Summer (DST): UTC+4:30 (IRDT)

Nureh (Persian: نوره, also Romanized as Nūreh, Naureh, and Navareh) is a village in Arandan Rural District, in the Central District of Sanandaj County, Kurdistan Province, Iran. At the 2006 census, its population was 776, in 212 families. The village is populated by Kurds.
