= Garmash, Iran =

Garmash گرماش
- Village
- Location within Iran
- Coordinates: 35°19′51″N 46°50′36″E
- Country: Iran
- Province: Kurdistan
- County: Sanandaj
- Bakhsh: Central
- Rural District: Arandan

Population (2006)
  - Total: 208
- Time zone: UTC+3:30 (IRST)
  - Summer (DST): UTC+4:30 (IRDT)

Garmash (Persian: گرماش, also Romanized as Garmāsh) is a village in Arandan Rural District, in the Central District of Sanandaj County, Kurdistan Province, Iran. At the 2006 census, its population was 208, in 48 families. The village is populated by Kurds.
