= Naisar =

Naisar نايي سر
- Village
- Location within Iran
- Coordinates: 35°19′36″N 47°04′07″E
- Country: Iran
- Province: Kurdistan
- County: Sanandaj
- Bakhsh: Central
- Rural District: Howmeh

Population (2006)
  - Total: 12,480
- Time zone: UTC+3:30 (IRST)
  - Summer (DST): UTC+4:30 (IRDT)

Naisar (Persian: نايي سر, also Romanized as Nā’ī Sar and Na yi Sār; also known as Nāysar and Neysār) is a village in Howmeh Rural District, in the Central District of Sanandaj County, Kurdistan Province, Iran. At the 2006 census, its population was 12,480, in 3,121 families. The village is populated by Kurds.
