= Hah Shamiz =

Village in Kurdistan province, Iran

Hah Shamiz Persian: هه شميز
- Village
- Location within Iran Location within Iran Kurdistan
- Coordinates: 35°12′55″N 46°47′18″E
- Country: Iran
- Province: Kurdistan
- County: Sanandaj
- District: Sirvan
- Rural District: Zhavarud-e Sharqi

Population (2016)
  - Total: 1,355
- Time zone: UTC+3:30 (IRST)

Hah Shamiz (Persian: هه شميز) (Note: Also romanized as Hah Shamīz; also known as Hashamīz, Hāshemīs, Hāshmīs, and Hashmīz) is a village in Zhavarud-e Sharqi Rural District of Sirvan District, Sanandaj County, Kurdistan province, Iran.

== Demographics ==
=== Ethnicity ===
The village is populated by Kurds.

=== Population ===
At the time of the 2006 National Census, the village's population was 1,522 in 362 households, when it was in the Central District. The following census in 2011 counted 1,400 people in 402 households. The 2016 census measured the population of the village as 1,355 people in 384 households, by which time the rural district had been separated from the district in the formation of Sirvan District. It was the most populous village in its rural district.
