= Kani Kuchek =

Kani Kuchek كاني كوچك
- Village
- Location within Iran
- Coordinates: 35°13′51″N 47°05′04″E
- Country: Iran
- Province: Kurdistan
- County: Sanandaj
- Bakhsh: Central
- Rural District: Howmeh

Population (2006)
  - Total: 103
- Time zone: UTC+3:30 (IRST)
  - Summer (DST): UTC+4:30 (IRDT)

Kani Kuchek (Persian: كاني كوچك, also Romanized as Kānī Kūchek and Kānī Kūchak; also known as Kānī Būchgaleh and Kāni Buch Qal ‘eh) is a village in Howmeh Rural District, in the Central District of Sanandaj County, Kurdistan Province, Iran. At the 2006 census, its population was 103, in 20 families. The village is populated by Kurds.
