= Bayanchub =

Bayanchub باينچوب
- Village
- Location within Iran
- Coordinates: 35°34′36″N 46°58′20″E
- Country: Iran
- Province: Kurdistan
- County: Sanandaj
- Bakhsh: Central
- Rural District: Hoseynabad-e Jonubi

Population (2006)
  - Total: 956
- Time zone: UTC+3:30 (IRST)
  - Summer (DST): UTC+4:30 (IRDT)

Bayanchub (Persian: باينچوب, also Romanized as Bāyanchūb, Bāīnchūb, Bayan Choob, and Bāyenchūb; also known as Baiānchū and Bayānchū) is a village in Hoseynabad-e Jonubi Rural District, in the Central District of Sanandaj County, Kurdistan Province, Iran. At the 2006 census, its population was 956, in 228 families. The village is populated by Kurds.
