= Qalvazeh =

Village in Kurdistan, Iran

Qalvazeh قلوزه
- Village
- Location within Iran
- Coordinates: 35°33′30″N 46°51′52″E
- Country: Iran
- Province: Kurdistan
- County: Sanandaj
- Bakhsh: Central
- Rural District: Sarab Qamish

Population (2006)
  - Total: 127
- Time zone: UTC+3:30 (IRST)
  - Summer (DST): UTC+4:30 (IRDT)

Qalvazeh (Persian: قلوزه, also Romanized as Qālvāzeh) is a village in Sarab Qamish Rural District, in the Central District of Sanandaj County, Kurdistan Province, Iran. At the 2006 census, its population was 127, in 23 families. The village is populated by Kurds.
