= Nanaleh =

Nanaleh ننله
- Village
- Location within Iran
- Coordinates: 35°21′50″N 47°01′35″E
- Country: Iran
- Province: Kurdistan
- County: Sanandaj
- Bakhsh: Central
- Rural District: Howmeh

Population (2006)
  - Total: 3,753
- Time zone: UTC+3:30 (IRST)
  - Summer (DST): UTC+4:30 (IRDT)

Nanaleh (Persian: ننله) is a village in Howmeh Rural District, in the Central District of Sanandaj County, Kurdistan Province, Iran. At the 2006 census, its population was 3,753, in 983 families. The village is populated by Kurds.
