= Khiareh =

Khiareh خياره
- Village
- Location within Iran
- Coordinates: 35°14′54″N 47°06′07″E
- Country: Iran
- Province: Kurdistan
- County: Sanandaj
- Bakhsh: Central
- Rural District: Howmeh

Population (2006)
  - Total: 606
- Time zone: UTC+3:30 (IRST)
  - Summer (DST): UTC+4:30 (IRDT)

Khiareh (Persian: خياره, also Romanized as Khīāreh and Kheyāreh) is a village in Howmeh Rural District, in the Central District of Sanandaj County, Kurdistan Province, Iran. At the 2006 census, its population was 606, in 123 families. The village is populated by Kurds.
