= Kani Shalaneh =

Kani Shalaneh كاني شلانه
- Village
- Location within Iran
- Coordinates: 35°07′00″N 46°52′00″E
- Country: Iran
- Province: Kurdistan
- County: Sanandaj
- Bakhsh: Central
- Rural District: Zhavarud-e Sharqi

Population (2006)
  - Total: 36
- Time zone: UTC+3:30 (IRST)
  - Summer (DST): UTC+4:30 (IRDT)

Kani Shalaneh (Persian: كاني شلانه, also Romanized as Kānī Shalāneh; also known as Kānī Salām) is a village in Zhavarud-e Sharqi Rural District, in the Central District of Sanandaj County, Kurdistan Province, Iran. At the 2006 census, its population was 36, in 11 families. The village is populated by Kurds.
