= Sheykh Vajim =

Sheykh Vajim شيخ وجيم
- Village
- Location within Iran
- Coordinates: 35°30′45″N 47°11′38″E
- Country: Iran
- Province: Kurdistan
- County: Sanandaj
- Bakhsh: Central
- Rural District: Hoseynabad-e Jonubi

Population (2006)
  - Total: 114
- Time zone: UTC+3:30 (IRST)
  - Summer (DST): UTC+4:30 (IRDT)

Sheykh Vajim (Persian: شيخ وجيم, also Romanized as Sheykh Vajīm; also known as Sheykhowjīm and Sheykh Vajam) is a village in Hoseynabad-e Jonubi Rural District, in the Central District of Sanandaj County, Kurdistan Province, Iran. At the 2006 census, its population was 114, in 19 families. The village is populated by Kurds.
