= Kazhi Karan =

Kazhi Karan كژي كران
- Village
- Location within Iran
- Coordinates: 35°37′25″N 47°14′13″E
- Country: Iran
- Province: Kurdistan
- County: Sanandaj
- Bakhsh: Central
- Rural District: Hoseynabad-e Jonubi

Population (2006)
  - Total: 165
- Time zone: UTC+3:30 (IRST)
  - Summer (DST): UTC+4:30 (IRDT)

Kazhi Karan (Persian: كژي كران, also Romanized as Kazhī Karān; also known as Kazhi Garan and Qāzī Karān) is a village in Hoseynabad-e Jonubi Rural District, in the Central District of Sanandaj County, Kurdistan Province, Iran. At the 2006 census, its population was 165, in 33 families. The village is populated by Kurds.
