= Hovanleh =

Hovanleh هوانله
- Village
- Location within Iran
- Coordinates: 35°06′00″N 47°05′12″E
- Country: Iran
- Province: Kurdistan
- County: Sanandaj
- Bakhsh: Central
- Rural District: Naran

Population (2006)
  - Total: 189
- Time zone: UTC+3:30 (IRST)
  - Summer (DST): UTC+4:30 (IRDT)

Hovanleh (Persian: هوانله, also Romanized as Hovānleh; also known as Hūollāh) is a village in Naran Rural District, in the Central District of Sanandaj County, Kurdistan Province, Iran. At the 2006 census, its population was 189, in 49 families. The village is populated by Kurds.
