= Dadaneh =

Dadaneh دادانه
- Village
- Location within Iran
- Coordinates: 35°16′46″N 46°52′51″E
- Country: Iran
- Province: Kurdistan
- County: Sanandaj
- Bakhsh: Central
- Rural District: Abidar

Population (2006)
  - Total: 1,225
- Time zone: UTC+3:30 (IRST)
  - Summer (DST): UTC+4:30 (IRDT)

Dadaneh (Persian: دادانه, also Romanized as Dādāneh) is a village in Abidar Rural District, in the Central District of Sanandaj County, Kurdistan Province, Iran. At the 2006 census, its population was 1,225, in 274 families. The village is populated by Kurds.
