= Qasrian =

Qasrian قصريان
- Village
- Location within Iran
- Coordinates: 35°08′50″N 47°03′43″E
- Country: Iran
- Province: Kurdistan
- County: Sanandaj
- Bakhsh: Central
- Rural District: Naran

Population (2006)
  - Total: 158
- Time zone: UTC+3:30 (IRST)
  - Summer (DST): UTC+4:30 (IRDT)

Qasrian (Persian: قصريان, also Romanized as Qaşrīān, Qaşreyān, and Qasrīyān) is a village in Naran Rural District, in the Central District of Sanandaj County, Kurdistan Province, Iran. At the 2006 census, its population was 158, in 46 families. The village is populated by Kurds.
