= Patli Dar =

Patli Dar پتليدر
- Village
- Location within Iran
- Coordinates: 35°11′36″N 46°51′20″E
- Country: Iran
- Province: Kurdistan
- County: Sanandaj
- Bakhsh: Central
- Rural District: Zhavarud-e Sharqi

Population (2006)
  - Total: 62
- Time zone: UTC+3:30 (IRST)
  - Summer (DST): UTC+4:30 (IRDT)

Patli Dar (Persian: پتليدر, also Romanized as Patlī Dar, Patlīdar, and Potlīdar; also known as Patliyār) is a village in Zhavarud-e Sharqi Rural District, in the Central District of Sanandaj County, Kurdistan Province, Iran. At the 2006 census, its population was 62, in 17 families. The village is populated by Kurds.
