= Lareh Val =

Lareh Val لره ول
- Village
- Location within Iran
- Coordinates: 35°05′59″N 46°55′33″E
- Country: Iran
- Province: Kurdistan
- County: Sanandaj
- Bakhsh: Central
- Rural District: Naran

Population (2006)
  - Total: 102
- Time zone: UTC+3:30 (IRST)
  - Summer (DST): UTC+4:30 (IRDT)

Lareh Val (Persian: لره ول; also known as Lareh Dūl) is a village in Naran Rural District, in the Central District of Sanandaj County, Kurdistan Province, Iran. At the 2006 census, its population was 102, in 27 families. The village is populated by Kurds.
