= Serenjianeh-ye Olya =

Serenjianeh-ye Olya سرنجيانه عليا
- Village
- Location within Iran
- Coordinates: 35°13′04″N 47°01′38″E
- Country: Iran
- Province: Kurdistan
- County: Sanandaj
- Bakhsh: Central
- Rural District: Naran

Population (2006)
  - Total: 342
- Time zone: UTC+3:30 (IRST)
  - Summer (DST): UTC+4:30 (IRDT)

Serenjianeh-ye Olya (Persian: سرنجيانه عليا, also Romanized as Serenjīāneh ‘Olyā; also known as Serenjīāneh Bālā, Serīnjīāneh-ye Bālā, and Sīrīnjīāneh-ye Bālā) is a village in Naran Rural District, in the Central District of Sanandaj County, Kurdistan Province, Iran. At the 2006 census, its population was 342, in 78 families. The village is populated by Kurds.
