= Savarian =

Savarian سواريان
- Village
- Location within Iran
- Coordinates: 35°07′48″N 46°53′26″E
- Country: Iran
- Province: Kurdistan
- County: Sanandaj
- Bakhsh: Central
- Rural District: Naran

Population (2006)
  - Total: 76
- Time zone: UTC+3:30 (IRST)
  - Summer (DST): UTC+4:30 (IRDT)

Savarian (Persian: سواريان, also Romanized as Savārīān; also known as Hānī Qorbānī and Kānī Qorbānī) is a village in Naran Rural District, in the Central District of Sanandaj County, Kurdistan Province, Iran. At the 2006 census, its population was 76, in 18 families. The village is populated by Kurds.
