= Ajgareh =

Ajgareh اجگره
- Village
- Location within Iran
- Coordinates: 35°22′24″N 46°57′42″E
- Country: Iran
- Province: Kurdistan
- County: Sanandaj
- Bakhsh: Central
- Rural District: Arandan

Population (2006)
  - Total: 249
- Time zone: UTC+3:30 (IRST)
  - Summer (DST): UTC+4:30 (IRDT)

Ajgareh (Persian: اجگره, also Romanized as Ājgareh; also known as Hazhgara and Hazh Garreh) is a village in Arandan Rural District, in the Central District of Sanandaj County, Kurdistan Province, Iran. At the 2006 census, its population was 249, in 54 families. The village is populated by Kurds.
