= Darreh Kuleh =

Village in Kurdistan province, Iran

Darreh Kuleh Persian: دره كوله
- Village
- Location within Iran Location within Iran Kurdistan
- Coordinates: 35°06′58″N 46°52′54″E
- Country: Iran
- Province: Kurdistan
- County: Sanandaj
- District: Sirvan
- Rural District: Miyanrud

Population (2016)
  - Total: 115
- Time zone: UTC+3:30 (IRST)

Darreh Kuleh (Persian: دره كوله) (Note: Also romanized as Darreh Kūleh; also known as Darahkolah) is a village in Miyanrud Rural District of Sirvan District, Sanandaj County, Kurdistan province, Iran, serving as capital of both the district and the rural district.

== Demographics ==
=== Ethnicity ===
The village is populated by Kurds.

=== Population ===
At the time of the 2006 National Census, the village's population was 201 in 46 households, when it was in Zhavarud-e Sharqi Rural District of the Central District. The following census in 2011 counted 156 people in 43 households. The 2016 census measured the population of the village as 115 people in 35 households, by which time the rural district had been separated from the district in the formation of Sirvan District. Darreh Kuleh was transferred to Miyanrud Rural District created in the new district.
