= Boz Laneh =

Boz Laneh بزلانه
- Village
- Location within Iran
- Coordinates: 35°04′48″N 46°52′45″E
- Country: Iran
- Province: Kurdistan
- County: Sanandaj
- Bakhsh: Central
- Rural District: Naran

Population (2006)
  - Total: 476
- Time zone: UTC+3:30 (IRST)
  - Summer (DST): UTC+4:30 (IRDT)

Boz Laneh (Persian: بزلانه, also Romanized as Boz Lāneh, Bezlāneh, and Boz Lānah; also known as Bij Laniyeh) is a village in Naran Rural District, in the Central District of Sanandaj County, Kurdistan Province, Iran. At the 2006 census, its population was 476, in 119 families. The village is populated by Kurds.
