= Hoseynabad Rural District =

Hoseynabad Rural District (Persian: دهستان حسين آباد) may refer to various places in Iran:

- Hoseynabad Rural District (Isfahan Province)
- Hoseynabad Rural District (Anar County), Kerman Province
- Hoseynabad Rural District (Anbarabad County), Kerman Province
- Hoseynabad Rural District (Khuzestan Province)

== See also ==
- Hoseynabad-e Jonubi Rural District, Kurdistan Province
- Hoseynabad-e Shomali Rural District, Kurdistan Province
