= Sang Sefid, Hoseynabad-e Jonubi =

Sang Sefid سنگ سفيد
- Village
- Location within Iran
- Coordinates: 35°34′13″N 46°55′53″E
- Country: Iran
- Province: Kurdistan
- County: Sanandaj
- Bakhsh: Central
- Rural District: Hoseynabad-e Jonubi

Population (2006)
  - Total: 194
- Time zone: UTC+3:30 (IRST)
  - Summer (DST): UTC+4:30 (IRDT)

Sang Sefid (Persian: سنگ سفيد, also Romanized as Sang Sefīd and Sangsefīd; also known as Kochak Charmu, Kochek Charmak, and Kūchak Charmū) is a village in Hoseynabad-e Jonubi Rural District, in the Central District of Sanandaj County, Kurdistan Province, Iran. At the 2006 census, its population was 194, in 52 families. The village is populated by Kurds.
