= Machekeh =

Machekeh or Machkeh (Persian: ماچكه), also rendered as Machgeh, may refer to:

- Machekeh-ye Olya
- Machekeh-ye Sofla
