= Asaveleh =

Asaveleh or Asavleh (Persian: آساوله) may refer to:

- Asaveleh, Kamyaran
- Asavleh, Sanandaj
