= Sarab Qamish =

Village in Kurdistan province, Iran

Sarab Qamish Persian: سراب قاميش
- Village
- Location within Iran Location within Iran Kurdistan
- Coordinates: 35°26′10″N 46°56′50″E
- Country: Iran
- Province: Kurdistan
- County: Sanandaj
- District: Central
- Rural District: Sarab Qamish

Population (2016)
  - Total: 1,901
- Time zone: UTC+3:30 (IRST)

Sarab Qamish (Persian: سراب قاميش) (Note: Also romanized as Sarāb Qāmīsh and Sarāb-e Qāmīsh; also known as Sar Auqāmīsh) is a village in, and the capital of, Sarab Qamish Rural District of the Central District of Sanandaj County, Kurdistan province, Iran.

== Demographics ==
=== Ethnicity ===
The village is populated by Kurds.

=== Population ===
At the time of the 2006 National Census, the village's population was 1,500 in 346 households. The following census in 2011 counted 1,767 people in 491 households. The 2016 census measured the population of the village as 1,901 people in 592 households. It was the most populous village in its rural district.
