= Sia Saran-e Sofla =

Sia Saran-e Sofla سياسران سفلي
- Village
- Location within Iran
- Coordinates: 35°36′06″N 47°12′12″E
- Country: Iran
- Province: Kurdistan
- County: Sanandaj
- Bakhsh: Central
- Rural District: Hoseynabad-e Jonubi

Population (2006)
  - Total: 238
- Time zone: UTC+3:30 (IRST)
  - Summer (DST): UTC+4:30 (IRDT)

Sia Saran-e Sofla (Persian: سياسران سفلي, also Romanized as Sīā Sarān-e Soflá; also known as Seyāh Sarān-e Soflá, Sīāh Sara, and Sīā Sarān-e Pā’īn) is a village in Hoseynabad-e Jonubi Rural District, in the Central District of Sanandaj County, Kurdistan Province, Iran. At the 2006 census, its population was 238, in 56 families. The village is populated by Kurds.
