= Garmidar =

Garmidar (Persian: گرميدر) may refer to:

- Garmidar, Kurdistan
- Garmidar, South Khorasan
