= Burban, Iran =

Burban بوربان
- Village
- Location within Iran
- Coordinates: 35°07′20″N 47°02′14″E
- Country: Iran
- Province: Kurdistan
- County: Sanandaj
- Bakhsh: Central
- Rural District: Naran

Population (2006)
  - Total: 138
- Time zone: UTC+3:30 (IRST)
  - Summer (DST): UTC+4:30 (IRDT)

Burban (Persian: بوربان, also Romanized as Būrbān, Būrebān, and Boorban; also known as Būrawān, Būrvān, and Būryān) is a village in Naran Rural District, in the Central District of Sanandaj County, Kurdistan Province, Iran. At the 2006 census, its population was 138, in 35 families. The village is populated by Kurds.
