= Aliabad, Naran =

Village in Kurdistan province, Iran

Aliabad Persian: علي آباد
- Village
- Location within Iran Location within Iran Kurdistan
- Coordinates: 35°07′00″N 46°57′00″E
- Country: Iran
- Province: Kurdistan
- County: Sanandaj
- District: Central
- Rural District: Naran

Population (2016)
  - Total: 108
- Time zone: UTC+3:30 (IRST)

Aliabad (Persian: علي آباد) (Note: Also romanized as ‘Alīābād; also known as ‘Alīābād Shīlān) is a village in, and the capital of, Naran Rural District of the Central District of Sanandaj County, Kurdistan province, Iran. The previous capital of the rural district was the village of Anguzhan.

== Demographics ==
=== Ethnicity ===
The village is populated by Kurds.

=== Population ===
At the time of the 2006 National Census, the village's population was 126 in 28 households. The following census in 2011 counted 126 people in 34 households. The 2016 census measured the population of the village as 108 people in 31 households.
