= Barazan, Kurdistan =

Barazan برازان
- Village
- Location within Iran
- Coordinates: 35°18′28″N 47°04′30″E
- Country: Iran
- Province: Kurdistan
- County: Sanandaj
- Bakhsh: Central
- Rural District: Howmeh

Population (2006)
  - Total: 292
- Time zone: UTC+3:30 (IRST)
  - Summer (DST): UTC+4:30 (IRDT)

Barazan (Persian: برازان, also Romanized as Barāzān; also known as Barāzau and Barāz’ū) is a village in Howmeh Rural District, in the Central District of Sanandaj County, Kurdistan Province, Iran. At the 2006 census, its population was 292, in 76 families. The village is populated by Kurds.
