= Karju =

Village in Kurdistan province, Iran

Karju Persian: كرجو
- Village
- Location within Iran Location within Iran Kurdistan
- Coordinates: 35°17′22″N 46°50′12″E
- Country: Iran
- Province: Kurdistan
- County: Sanandaj
- District: Central
- Rural District: Abidar

Population (2016)
  - Total: 1,942
- Time zone: UTC+3:30 (IRST)

Karju (Persian: كرجو) (Note: Also romanized as Karjū; also known as Qaraju) is a village in Abidar Rural District of the Central District of Sanandaj County, Kurdistan province, Iran.

== Demographics ==
=== Ethnicity ===
The village is populated by Kurds.

=== Population ===
At the time of the 2006 National Census, the village's population was 2,172 in 476 households. The following census in 2011 counted 2,072 people in 561 households. The 2016 census measured the population of the village as 1,942 people in 553 households. It was the most populous village in its rural district.
