= Salavatabad, Sanandaj =

Village in Kurdistan province, Iran

Salavatabad Persian: صلوات آباد
- Village
- Location within Iran Location within Iran Kurdistan
- Coordinates: 35°16′43″N 47°07′24″E
- Country: Iran
- Province: Kurdistan
- County: Sanandaj
- District: Central
- Rural District: Howmeh

Population (2016)
  - Total: 3,215
- Time zone: UTC+3:30 (IRST)

Salavatabad (Persian: صلوات آباد) (Note: Also romanized as Şalavātābād, Şalvātābād, and Salwātābād; also known as Namān) is a village in, and the capital of, Howmeh Rural District of the Central District of Sanandaj County, Kurdistan province, Iran.

== Demographics ==
=== Ethnicity ===
The village is populated by Kurds.

=== Population ===
At the time of the 2006 National Census, the village's population was 3,332 in 806 households. The following census in 2011 counted 3,399 people in 997 households. The 2016 census measured the population of the village as 3,215 people in 1,008 households.
