= Garmidar, Kurdistan =

Garmidar گرميدر
- Village
- Location within Iran
- Coordinates: 35°15′05″N 47°03′54″E
- Country: Iran
- Province: Kurdistan
- County: Sanandaj
- Bakhsh: Central
- Rural District: Howmeh

Population (2006)
  - Total: 156
- Time zone: UTC+3:30 (IRST)
  - Summer (DST): UTC+4:30 (IRDT)

Garmidar (Persian: گرميدر, also Romanized as Garmīdar) is a village in Howmeh Rural District, in the Central District of Sanandaj County, Kurdistan Province, Iran. At the 2006 census, its population was 156, in 33 families. The village is populated by Kurds.
