= Machekeh-ye Sofla =

Machekeh-ye Sofla ماچكه سفلي
- Village
- Location within Iran
- Coordinates: 35°29′11″N 47°11′05″E
- Country: Iran
- Province: Kurdistan
- County: Sanandaj
- Bakhsh: Central
- Rural District: Hoseynabad-e Jonubi

Population (2006)
  - Total: 285
- Time zone: UTC+3:30 (IRST)
  - Summer (DST): UTC+4:30 (IRDT)

Machekeh-ye Sofla (Persian: ماچكه سفلي, also romanized as Māchekeh-ye Soflá; also known as Māchekeh-ye Pā’īn, Māchgeh-ye Pā’īn, Māchgeh-ye Soflá, Machkeh Pāin, Machkeh-ye Pā’īn, and Māchkeh-ye Soflá) is a village in Hoseynabad-e Jonubi Rural District, in the Central District of Sanandaj County, Kurdistan Province, Iran. At the 2006 census, its population was 285, in 70 families. The village is populated by Kurds.
