= Malekshan-e Sofla =

Malekshan-e Sofla ملكشان سفلي
- Village
- Location within Iran
- Coordinates: 35°15′05″N 46°52′19″E
- Country: Iran
- Province: Kurdistan
- County: Sanandaj
- Bakhsh: Central
- Rural District: Abidar

Population (2006)
  - Total: 67
- Time zone: UTC+3:30 (IRST)
  - Summer (DST): UTC+4:30 (IRDT)

Malekshan-e Sofla (Persian: ملكشان سفلي, also Romanized as Malekshān-e Soflá and Malakshān-e Soflá; also known as Malakshān and Malekshān-e Pā’īn) is a village in Abidar Rural District, in the Central District of Sanandaj County, Kurdistan Province, Iran. At the 2006 census, its population was 67, in 17 families. The village is populated by Kurds.
