= Dushan, Iran =

Dushan (Persian: دوشن or دوشان) in Iran may refer to:

- Dushan, Kerman (دوشن - Dūshan)
- Dushan, Kurdistan (دوشان - Dūshān)
