= Baqerabad, Sanandaj =

Village in Kurdistan province, Iran

Baqerabad Persian: باقر آباد
- Village
- Location within Iran Location within Iran Kurdistan
- Coordinates: 35°35′47″N 47°08′53″E
- Country: Iran
- Province: Kurdistan
- County: Sanandaj
- District: Hoseynabad
- Rural District: Hoseynabad-e Shomali

Population (2016)
  - Total: 744
- Time zone: UTC+3:30 (IRST)

Baqerabad (Persian: باقر آباد) (Note: Also romanized as Bāqerābād; also known as Bāqelābād and Baqlābād) is a village in Hoseynabad-e Shomali Rural District of Hoseynabad District, Sanandaj County, Kurdistan province, Iran.

== Demographics ==
=== Ethnicity ===
The village is populated by Kurds.

=== Population ===
At the time of the 2006 National Census, the village's population was 793 in 180 households, when it was in Saral District of Divandarreh County. The following census in 2011 counted 890 people in 251 households. The 2016 census measured the population of the village as 744 people in 227 households, by which time the rural district had been separated from the county in the formation of Hoseynabad District of Sanandaj County. It was the most populous village in its rural district.
