= Dushan =

Dushan may refer to:

- Dušan, or Dushan, a Slavic name
- Dushana (Ramayana), a rakshasa in the Indian epic Ramayana
- Dushan, Kerman, Iran, a village in Kerman Province, Iran
- Dushan, Kurdistan, Iran, a village in Kurdistan Province, Iran

== China ==
- Dushan County (独山县), Guizhou
- Mount Du (独山), near Nanyang, Henan
- Dushan Lake (独山湖), part of Nansi Lake in Shandong

Towns

- Dushan, Echeng District (杜山镇), in Echeng District, Ezhou, Hubei

Written as "独山镇":

- Dushan, Lu'an, in Yu'an District, Lu'an, Anhui
- Dushan, Huangmei County, Hubei
- Dushan, Shandong, in Juye County

Township(s)

- Dushan Township (独山乡), Lai'an County, Anhui
