= Mamukh-e Sofla =

Mamukh-e Sofla ماموخ سفلي
- Village
- Location within Iran
- Coordinates: 35°29′49″N 46°59′48″E
- Country: Iran
- Province: Kurdistan
- County: Sanandaj
- Bakhsh: Central
- Rural District: Hoseynabad-e Jonubi

Population (2006)
  - Total: 132
- Time zone: UTC+3:30 (IRST)
  - Summer (DST): UTC+4:30 (IRDT)

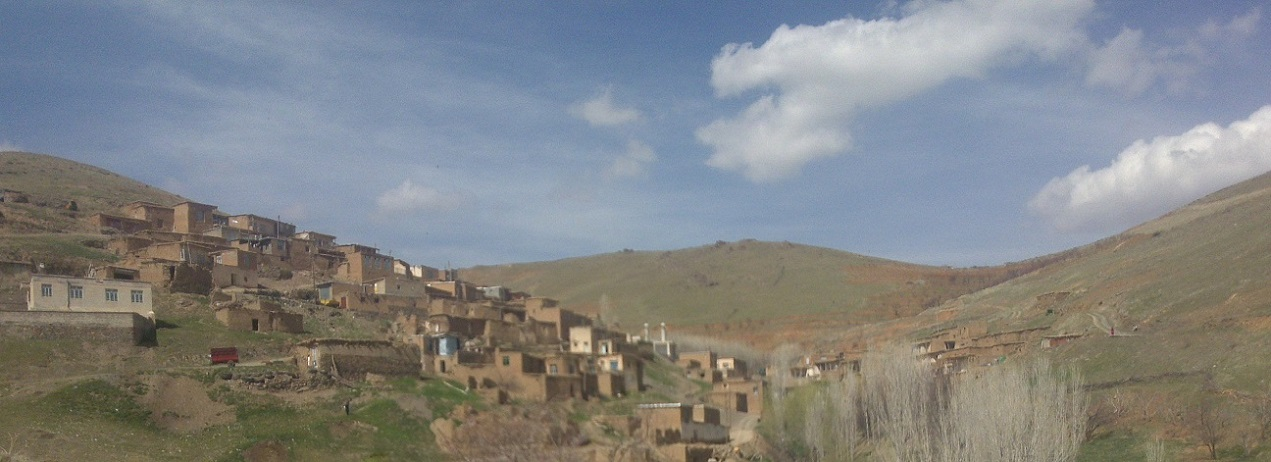
Mamukh-e Sofla in 2014

Mamukh-e Sofla (Persian: ماموخ سفلي, also Romanized as Māmūkh-e Soflá; also known as Māmoq-e Pā'īn) is a village in Hoseynabad-e Jonubi Rural District, in the Central District of Sanandaj County, Kurdistan Province, Iran. At the 2006 census, its population was 132, in 31 families. The village is populated by Kurds.
