= Gav Darreh, Kurdistan =

Gav Darreh گاودره
- Village
- Location within Iran
- Coordinates: 35°29′51″N 46°49′04″E
- Country: Iran
- Province: Kurdistan
- County: Sanandaj
- Bakhsh: Central
- Rural District: Sarab Qamish

Population (2006)
  - Total: 261
- Time zone: UTC+3:30 (IRST)
  - Summer (DST): UTC+4:30 (IRDT)

Gav Darreh (Persian: گاودره, also Romanized as Gāv Darreh; also known as Gāvareh, Gāveh Darreh, and Gāwareh) is a village in Sarab Qamish Rural District, in the Central District of Sanandaj County, Kurdistan Province, Iran. At the 2006 census, its population was 261, in 54 families. The village is populated by Kurds.
