= Sia Saran-e Olya =

Sia Saran-e Olya سياسران عليا
- Village
- Location within Iran
- Coordinates: 35°38′01″N 47°12′49″E
- Country: Iran
- Province: Kurdistan
- County: Sanandaj
- Bakhsh: Central
- Rural District: Hoseynabad-e Jonubi

Population (2006)
  - Total: 172
- Time zone: UTC+3:30 (IRST)
  - Summer (DST): UTC+4:30 (IRDT)

Sia Saran-e Olya (Persian: سياسران عليا, also Romanized as Sīā Sarān-e ‘Olyā; also known as Seyāh Sarān-e ‘Olyā, Sīāh Sara, and Sīā Sarān-e Bālā) is a village in Hoseynabad-e Jonubi Rural District, in the Central District of Sanandaj County, Kurdistan Province, Iran. At the 2006 census, its population was 172, in 37 families. The village is populated by Kurds.
