= Sia Saran =

Sia Saran (Persian: سياسران), also rendered as Seyah Saran or Siah Sara, may refer to:

- Sia Saran-e Olya
- Sia Saran-e Sofla
