= Kilaneh =

Village in Kurdistan province, Iran

Kilaneh Persian: كيلانه
- Village
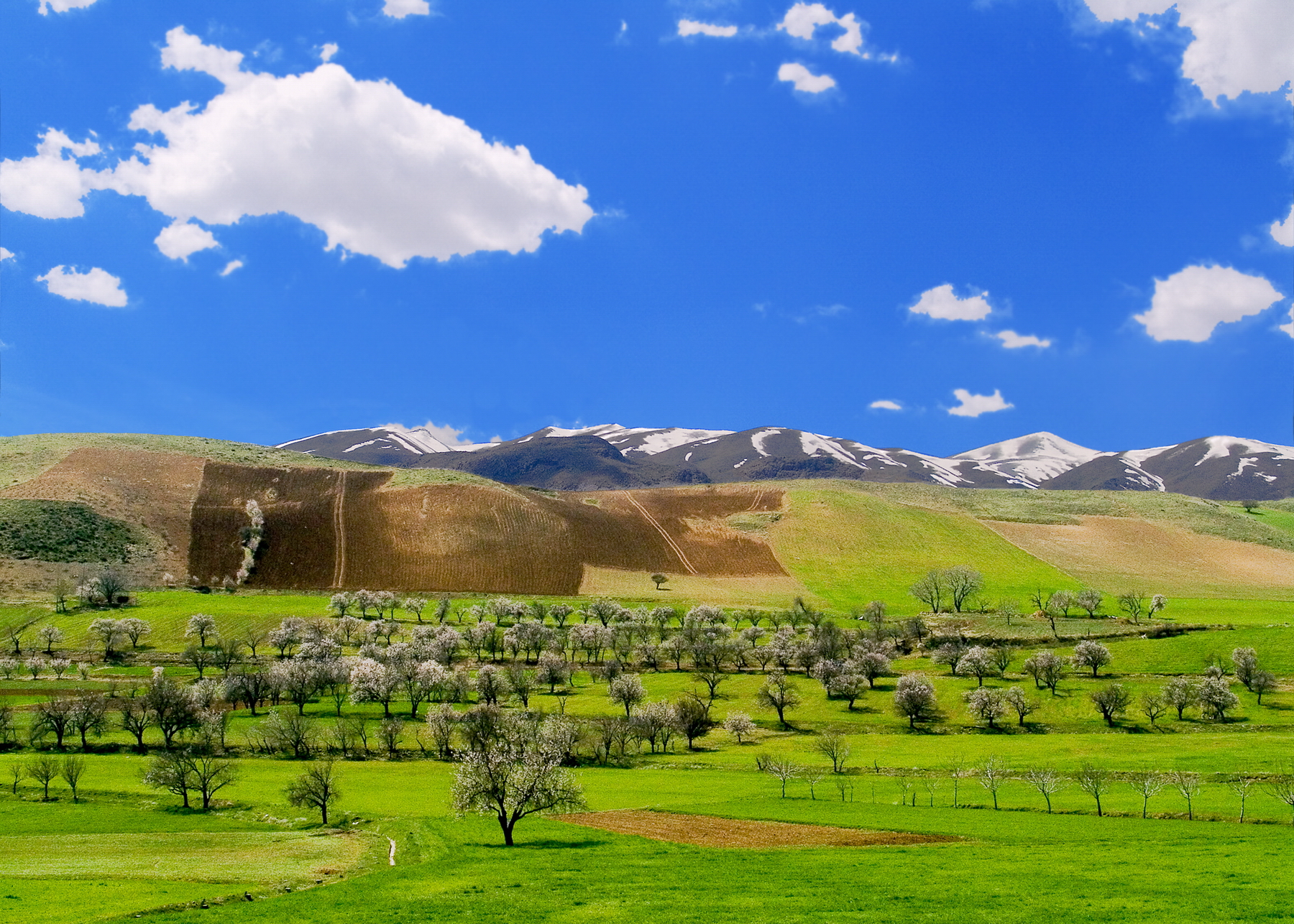
- Landscape near Kilaneh

- Location within Iran Location within Iran Kurdistan
- Coordinates: 35°14′50″N 46°53′45″E
- Country: Iran
- Province: Kurdistan
- County: Sanandaj
- District: Central
- Rural District: Abidar

Population (2016)
  - Total: 894
- Time zone: UTC+3:30 (IRST)

Kilaneh (Persian: كيلانه) (Note: Also romanized as Keylāneh and Kīlāneh; also known as Gīlāneh and Kīfaneh) is a village in, and the capital of, Abidar Rural District of the Central District of Sanandaj County, Kurdistan province, Iran. The previous capital of the rural district was village of Hasanabad.

== Demographics ==
=== Ethnicity ===
The village is populated by Kurds.

=== Population ===
At the time of the 2006 National Census, the village's population was 1,008 in 263 households. The following census in 2011 counted 1,023 people in 302 households. The 2016 census measured the population of the village as 894 people in 265 households.
