= Qolyan, Kurdistan =

Qolyan قليان
- Village
- Location within Iran
- Coordinates: 35°23′55″N 47°01′06″E
- Country: Iran
- Province: Kurdistan
- County: Sanandaj
- Bakhsh: Central
- Rural District: Howmeh

Population (2006)
  - Total: 1,283
- Time zone: UTC+3:30 (IRST)
  - Summer (DST): UTC+4:30 (IRDT)

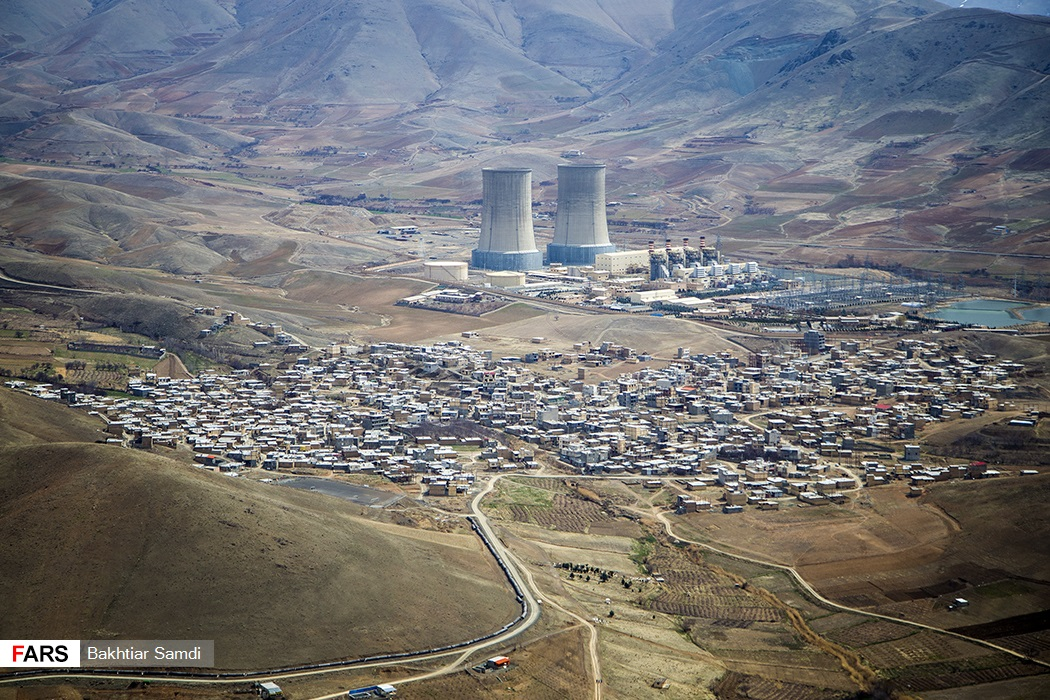

Qolyan (Persian: قليان, also Romanized as Qolyān and Qolīān; also known as Ghalyan, Golkhīrān, Gol Khīzān, Kūlyān, and Quliyān) is a village in Howmeh Rural District, in the Central District of Sanandaj County, Kurdistan Province, Iran. At the 2006 census, its population was 1,283, in 326 families. The village is populated by Kurds.
