= Tazehabad-e Doveyseh =

Tazehabad-e Doveyseh تازه آباد دويسه
- Village
- Location within Iran
- Coordinates: 35°21′42″N 46°48′00″E
- Country: Iran
- Province: Kurdistan
- County: Sanandaj
- Bakhsh: Central
- Rural District: Sarab Qamish

Population (2006)
  - Total: 79
- Time zone: UTC+3:30 (IRST)
  - Summer (DST): UTC+4:30 (IRDT)

Tazehabad-e Doveyseh (Persian: تازه آباد دويسه, also Romanized as Tāzehābād-e Doveyseh; also known as ‘Īsáābād, Tāzehābād, and Tāzehābād-e 'Īsáābād) is a village in Sarab Qamish Rural District, in the Central District of Sanandaj County, Kurdistan Province, Iran. At the 2006 census, its population was 79, in 19 families. The village is populated by Kurds.
