= Narran =

Narran may refer to:

- Narran, a parish in Yancowinna County, New South Wales, Australia
- Narran County, New South Wales, Australia
- Narran River, New South Wales, Australia
  - Narran Wetlands
- Naran, Kurdistan, Iran

== See also ==
- Naran (disambiguation)
- Homo narrans ('storytelling human'), a binomial names for the human species
