= Hanis, Iran =

Hanis هانيس
- Village
- Location within Iran
- Coordinates: 35°14′13″N 47°07′13″E
- Country: Iran
- Province: Kurdistan
- County: Sanandaj
- Bakhsh: Central
- Rural District: Howmeh

Population (2006)
  - Total: 510
- Time zone: UTC+3:30 (IRST)
  - Summer (DST): UTC+4:30 (IRDT)

Hanis (Persian: هانيس, also romanized as Hānīs) is a village in Howmeh Rural District, in the Central District of Sanandaj County, Kurdistan Province, Iran. At the 2006 census, its population was 510, in 110 families. The village is populated by Kurds.

The meaning of Hanis means land full of water, from which this edited name Kanis is taken. Hanis is a village close to Sanandaj city, which has amazing nature and hardworking people. Hanis has high mountains, the highest of which is called Gaele Rei, which means a place where only an ibex can climb. This village has an agricultural and horticultural area. The climate of this village is very cold and snowy in winter and mild in summer. The products of this village include walnuts, almonds, plums, peaches, grapes, summer fruits, wheat, sunflower seeds, etc.
