= Mamukh =

Mamukh (Persian: ماموخ), also rendered as Mamaq or Mamoq may refer to:

- Mamukh-e Olya
- Mamukh-e Sofla
