= Arandan =

Village in Kurdistan province, Iran

Arandan Persian: آرندان
- Village
- Location within Iran Location within Iran Kurdistan
- Coordinates: 35°23′10″N 46°54′58″E
- Country: Iran
- Province: Kurdistan
- County: Sanandaj
- District: Central
- Rural District: Arandan

Population (2016)
  - Total: 2,106
- Time zone: UTC+3:30 (IRST)

Arandan (Persian: آرندان) (Note: Also romanized as Ārandān and Arandān; also known as Aranan, Arenān, Ārnān, and Randān) is a village in, and the capital of, Arandan Rural District of the Central District of Sanandaj County, Kurdistan province, Iran.

== Demographics ==
=== Ethnicity ===
The village is populated by Kurds.

=== Population ===
At the time of the 2006 National Census, the village's population was 1,570 in 359 households. The following census in 2011 counted 2,187 people in 567 households. The 2016 census measured the population of the village as 2,106 people in 601 households. It was the most populous village in its rural district.
