= Kulaseh =

Kulaseh or Kulasah or Kul Aseh (Persian: كولسه) may refer to:

- Kulaseh, Javanrud, Kermanshah Province
- Kulasah, Kurdistan

== See also ==
- Kolasah (disambiguation)
