= Machekeh-ye Olya =

Machekeh-ye Olya ماچكه عليا
- Village
- Location within Iran
- Coordinates: 35°28′33″N 47°09′45″E
- Country: Iran
- Province: Kurdistan
- County: Sanandaj
- Bakhsh: Central
- Rural District: Hoseynabad-e Jonubi

Population (2006)
  - Total: 275
- Time zone: UTC+3:30 (IRST)
  - Summer (DST): UTC+4:30 (IRDT)

Machekeh-ye Olya (Persian: ماچكه عليا, also Romanized as Māchekeh-ye ‘Olyā; also known as Māchekeh-ye Bālā, Māchgeh, Māchgeh-ye Bālā, Māchgeh-ye ‘Olyā, Machkeh Bāla, and Machkeh-ye Bālā) is a village in Hoseynabad-e Jonubi Rural District, in the Central District of Sanandaj County, Kurdistan Province, Iran. At the 2006 census, its population was 275, in 60 families. The village is populated by Kurds.
