= Khoshkeh Dul, Sanandaj =

Khoshkeh Dul خشكه دول
- Village
- Location within Iran
- Coordinates: 35°13′03″N 46°58′13″E
- Country: Iran
- Province: Kurdistan
- County: Sanandaj
- Bakhsh: Central
- Rural District: Abidar

Population (2006)
  - Total: 181
- Time zone: UTC+3:30 (IRST)
  - Summer (DST): UTC+4:30 (IRDT)

Khoshkeh Dul (Persian: خشكه دول, also Romanized as Khoshkeh Dūl) is a village in Abidar Rural District, in the Central District of Sanandaj County, Kurdistan Province, Iran. At the 2006 census, its population was 181, in 49 families. The village is populated by Kurds.
