= Kolasah =

Kolasah (Persian: كلسه) may refer to:

- Kolasah, Kermanshah
- Kolasah, Kurdistan

== See also ==
- Kulaseh (disambiguation)
