= Mamukh-e Olya =

Mamukh-e Olya ماموخ عليا
- Village
- Location within Iran
- Coordinates: 35°30′49″N 47°03′03″E
- Country: Iran
- Province: Kurdistan
- County: Sanandaj
- Bakhsh: Central
- Rural District: Hoseynabad-e Jonubi

Population (2006)
  - Total: 170
- Time zone: UTC+3:30 (IRST)
  - Summer (DST): UTC+4:30 (IRDT)

Mamukh-e Olya (Persian: ماموخ عليا, also Romanized as Māmūkh-e ‘Olyā; also known as Māmaq, Māmāq-e Bālā, and Māmoq-e ‘Olyā) is a village in Hoseynabad-e Jonubi Rural District, in the Central District of Sanandaj County, Kurdistan Province, Iran. At the 2006 census, its population was 170, in 47 families. The village is populated by Kurds.
