= Serenjianeh-ye Sofla =

Village in Kurdistan province, Iran

Serenjianeh-ye Sofla Persian: سرنجيانه سفلي
- Village
- Location within Iran Location within Iran Kurdistan
- Coordinates: 35°12′21″N 47°00′31″E
- Country: Iran
- Province: Kurdistan
- County: Sanandaj
- District: Central
- Rural District: Naran

Population (2016)
  - Total: 683
- Time zone: UTC+3:30 (IRST)

Serenjianeh-ye Sofla (Persian: سرنجيانه سفلي) (Note: Also romanized as Serenjīāneh Soflá; also known as Serenjīāneh Pā’īn, Serīnjīāneh-ye Pā'īn, and Sīrīnjīāneh-ye Pā’īn) is a village in Naran Rural District of the Central District of Sanandaj County, Kurdistan province, Iran.

== Demographics ==
=== Ethnicity ===
The village is populated by Kurds.

=== Population ===
At the time of the 2006 National Census, the village's population was 609 in 142 households. The following census in 2011 counted 695 people in 192 households. The 2016 census measured the population of the village as 683 people in 212 households. It was the most populous village in its rural district.
