= Baharestan, Kurdistan =

Village in Kurdistan province, Iran

Baharestan Persian: بهارستان
- Village
- Location within Iran Location within Iran Kurdistan
- Coordinates: 35°38′26″N 47°06′34″E
- Country: Iran
- Province: Kurdistan
- County: Sanandaj
- District: Hoseynabad
- Rural District: Hoseynabad-e Shomali

Population (2016)
  - Total: 505
- Time zone: UTC+3:30 (IRST)

Baharestan (Persian: بهارستان) (Note: Also romanized as Bahārestān, formerly Kharkeh (خرکه)) is a village in, and the capital of, Hoseynabad-e Shomali Rural District of Hoseynabad District, Sanandaj County, Kurdistan province, Iran.

== Demographics ==
=== Ethnicity ===
The village is populated by Kurds.

=== Population ===
At the time of the 2006 National Census, the village's population was 485 in 98 households, when it was in Saral District of Divandarreh County. The following census in 2011 counted 477 people in 126 households. The 2016 census measured the population of the village as 505 people in 124 households, by which time the rural district had been separated from the county in the formation of Hoseynabad District of Sanandaj County.
