= Zandan, Kurdistan =

Zandan زندان
- Village
- Location within Iran
- Coordinates: 35°14′04″N 46°52′52″E
- Country: Iran
- Province: Kurdistan
- County: Sanandaj
- Bakhsh: Central
- Rural District: Abidar

Population (2006)
  - Total: 134
- Time zone: UTC+3:30 (IRST)
  - Summer (DST): UTC+4:30 (IRDT)

Zandan (Persian: زندان, also Romanized as Zandān and Zendān; also known as Narān and Zanān) is a village in Abidar Rural District, in the Central District of Sanandaj County, Kurdistan Province, Iran. At the 2006 census, its population was 134, in 30 families. The village is populated by Kurds.
