= Gazneh, Kurdistan =

Gazna گزنه
- Village
- Location within Iran
- Coordinates: 35°10′03″N 46°56′30″E
- Country: Iran
- Province: Kurdistan
- County: Sanandaj
- Bakhsh: Central
- Rural District: Abidar

Population (2006)
  - Total: 194
- Time zone: UTC+3:30 (IRST)
  - Summer (DST): UTC+4:30 (IRDT)

Gazna (Persian: گزنه, also Romanized as Gazneh; is a village in Abidar Rural District, in the Central District of Sanandaj County, Kurdistan Province, Iran. At the 2006 census, its population was 194, in 49 families. The village is populated by Kurds.
