= Miyanrud Rural District =

Rural district in Kurdistan province, Iran

Miyanrud Rural District Persian: دهستان میان‌رود
- Rural District
- Location within Iran Location within Iran Kurdistan
- Coordinates: 35°05′42″N 46°47′08″E
- Country: Iran
- Province: Kurdistan
- County: Sanandaj
- District: Sirvan
- Capital: Darreh Kuleh

Population (2016)
  - Total: 6,591
- Time zone: UTC+3:30 (IRST)

Miyanrud Rural District (Persian: دهستان میان‌رود) is in Sirvan District of Sanandaj County, Kurdistan province, Iran. Its capital is the village of Darreh Kuleh.

== History ==
In 2011, Zhavarud-e Sharqi Rural District was separated from the Central District in the establishment of Sirvan District, and Miyanrud Rural District was created in the new district.

== Demographics ==
=== Population ===
At the time of the 2016 National Census, the rural district's population was 6,591 in 1,933 households. The most populous of its 11 villages was Galin, with 1,135 people.
