= Khoshkeh Dul =

Khoshkeh Dul (Persian: خشكه دول) may refer to:

- Khoshkeh Dul, Zhavehrud, Kamyaran County
- Khoshkeh Dul, Sanandaj
