= Hasanabad, Sanandaj =

Neighborhood in Kurdistan province, Iran

Hasanabad Persian: كرجو
- Neighborhood
- Location within Iran Location within Iran Kurdistan
- Coordinates: 35°15′27″N 46°58′06″E
- Country: Iran
- Province: Kurdistan
- County: Sanandaj
- District: Central
- City: Sanandaj

Population (2006)
  - Total: 7,292
- Time zone: UTC+3:30 (IRST)

Hasanabad (Persian: حسن آباد) (Note: Also romanized as Ḩasanābād) is a neighborhood in the city of Sanandaj of the Central District of Sanandaj County, Kurdistan province, Iran. As a village, it was the capital of Abidar Rural District until its capital was transferred to the village of Kilaneh.

== History ==
In AD 1345 (746 AH), "Amir Hasan Khan Ardalan" built a strong fort for the center of his government on the top of a mountain in the south of the village. In the late sixteenth century AD (the beginning of the tenth century AH), Helu Khan Ardalan, the then governor of Kurdistan, made it the seat of government. Probably, before the establishment of the city of Sane Dej (Sanandaj), Abadii and Hassanabad Castle were the capital of Kurdistan Province, and from AD 1636 (1046 AH) after the destruction of Hassanabad Castle, Sanandaj became the center of Kurdistan Province. The remains of Hassan Abad Castle facilities are still in place.

Hassanabad Castle is one of the difficult and strategic hills of the region, which has a relatively steep slope on the mountainside. This castle is a type of mountain castle that has high stone walls on the slope of the mountain and towers along the walls. The wall of the castle is about 1100 meters, which starts at a height of 200 meters and rises to a height of 400 meters. The main administrative and military buildings inside the castle are built on the highest point of the mountain at a height of 400 meters, which mainly have brick architecture. From the lowest part of the wall to the top of the mountain, platforms for the construction of the building of the castle residents have been created in the outer layer of the hill, and the castle also has a tower, a rampart, and a stone fence, the type of material of which is made of local stone and mud mortar.

According to archaeologists, this area was undoubtedly one of the biggest fortresses and fighting bases for Iranians during the wars between Iran and Rome. Also, later during the Safavid era, this region was the center of the ruling government of Kurdistan (Ardlan). There have been conflicts between Ardalan and the Safavid king, which has led to peace between both sides. Based on this peace, the Safavid king asked Ardalan to destroy parts of this castle.

A group cemetery was found in this area, which is estimated to be at least 3,000 years old. Large jars filled with bronze were also found at the site.

Hasan Abad Castle has been registered in the list of national monuments under the number 11758 on March 24, 2003. It is one of the most popular tourist attractions in Kurdistan.

== Demographics ==
=== Ethnicity ===
The neighborhood is populated by Kurds.

=== Population ===
At the time of the 2006 National Census, Hasanabad's population was 7,292 in 1,868 households, when it was a village in Abidar Rural District. After the census, Hasanabad was absorbed by the city of Sanandaj as a neighborhood referred to as District 3.

== Geography ==
Hasanabad is located 5 km from Sanandaj city at the crossing point of at least 34 villages in the region. While the wave of marginalization has been created in the four informal settlements of Sanandaj, "Hasan Abad" is also located as one of the four separated urban areas of Sanandaj in the southwest side of this city.
