= Anguzhan =

Village in Kurdistan province, Iran

Anguzhan Persian: انگوژان
- Village
- Location within Iran Location within Iran Kurdistan
- Coordinates: 35°05′06″N 46°57′25″E
- Country: Iran
- Province: Kurdistan
- County: Sanandaj
- District: Central
- Rural District: Naran

Population (2016)
  - Total: 126
- Time zone: UTC+3:30 (IRST)

Anguzhan (Persian: انگوژان) (Note: Also romanized as Angūzhān) is a village in, and the former capital of, Naran Rural District of the Central District of Sanandaj County, Kurdistan province, Iran. The capital of the rural district has been transferred to the village of Aliabad.

== Demographics ==
=== Ethnicity ===
The village is populated by Kurds.

=== Population ===
At the time of the 2006 National Census, the village's population was 237 in 52 households. The following census in 2011 counted 173 people in 47 households. The 2016 census measured the population of the village as 126 people in 38 households.
