= Sang-e Sefid, Naran =

Sang-e Sefid سنگ سفيد
- Village
- Location within Iran
- Coordinates: 35°04′26″N 46°55′26″E
- Country: Iran
- Province: Kurdistan
- County: Sanandaj
- Bakhsh: Central
- Rural District: Naran

Population (2006)
  - Total: 80
- Time zone: UTC+3:30 (IRST)
  - Summer (DST): UTC+4:30 (IRDT)

Sang-e Sefid (Persian: سنگ سفيد, also Romanized as Sang-e Sefīd; also known as Kūchek Charmeh and Kūchek Chel Mah) is a village in Naran Rural District, in the Central District of Sanandaj County, Kurdistan Province, Iran. At the 2006 census, its population was 80, in 17 families. The village is populated by Kurds.
