= Malekshan =

Malekshan or Malakshan (Persian: ملكشان) may refer to:

- Malekshan-e Olya
- Malekshan-e Sofla
