= Naran, Kurdistan =

Naran نران
- Village
- Location in Iran
- Coordinates: 35°08′52″N 47°06′21″E
- Country: Iran
- Province: Kurdistan
- County: Sanandaj
- Bakhsh: Central
- Rural District: Naran

Population (2006)
  - Total: 649
- Time zone: UTC+3:30 (IRST)
  - Summer (DST): UTC+4:30 (IRDT)

Naran (Persian: نران, also Romanized as Narān and Narrān) is a village in Naran Rural District, in the Central District of Sanandaj County, Kurdistan Province, Iran. At the 2006 census, its population was 649, in 191 families. The village is primarily populated by Kurds.
