= Dushan, Kurdistan =

Dushan دوشان
- Village
- Location within Iran
- Coordinates: 35°15′12″N 47°02′32″E
- Country: Iran
- Province: Kurdistan
- County: Sanandaj
- Bakhsh: Central
- Rural District: Howmeh

Population (2006)
  - Total: 2,143
- Time zone: UTC+3:30 (IRST)
  - Summer (DST): UTC+4:30 (IRDT)

Dushan (Persian: دوشان, also Romanized as Dūshān) is a village in Howmeh Rural District, in the Central District of Sanandaj County, Kurdistan Province, Iran. At the 2006 census, its population was 2,143, in 485 families. The village is populated by Kurds.
