= Ashab-e Olya =

Ashab-e Olya اصحاب عليا
- Village
- Location within Iran
- Coordinates: 35°42′08″N 47°05′46″E
- Country: Iran
- Province: Kurdistan
- County: Divandarreh
- Bakhsh: Saral
- Rural District: Hoseynabad-e Shomali

Population (2006)
  - Total: 117
- Time zone: UTC+3:30 (IRST)
  - Summer (DST): UTC+4:30 (IRDT)

Ashab-e Olya (Persian: اصحاب عليا, also Romanized as Aşḩāb-e ‘Olyā; also known as Aşḩāb) is a village in Hoseynabad-e Shomali Rural District, Saral District, Divandarreh County, Kurdistan Province, Iran. At the 2006 census, its population was 117, in 29 families. The village is populated by Kurds.
