= Kalhorabad =

Kalhorabad كلهر آباد
- Village
- Location within Iran
- Coordinates: 35°39′14″N 47°05′12″E
- Country: Iran
- Province: Kurdistan
- County: Divandarreh
- Bakhsh: Saral
- Rural District: Hoseynabad-e Shomali

Population (2006)
  - Total: 370
- Time zone: UTC+3:30 (IRST)
  - Summer (DST): UTC+4:30 (IRDT)

Kalhorabad (Persian: كلهر آباد, also Romanized as Kalhorābād; also known as Kalhūrābād and Khalrāwa) is a village in Hoseynabad-e Shomali Rural District, Saral District, Divandarreh County, Kurdistan Province, Iran. At the 2006 census, its population was 370, in 76 families. The village is populated by Kurds.
