= Buryan =

Buryan may refer to:

- Buryan, alternative name for Burban, Iran
- St Buryan, a civil parish and village in Cornwall
- Jan Buryán, Czech football player
- Oleg Buryan, Russian artist
