= Nurun =

Nurun (Persian: نورون) may refer to:

- Nurun, Kerman
- Nurun, Zanjan
