= Narine =

Narine is both a feminine given name of Armenian origin, and a surname perhaps of Indian origin. People with that name include:

== Given name ==
- Narine Dovlatyan (born 1991), Armenian jazz singer and actress
- Narine Karakashian (born 1971), Armenian chess player
- Narine Misak Balayan (born 1940), see Ministers of Social Protection of the Second Republic of Armenia#Narine Misak Balayan
- Nariné Simonian (born 1965), Armenian-French classical organist

== Surname ==
- David Narine (born 1949), Guyanese former cricket umpire
- Sunil Narine (born 1988), Trinidadian cricketer

== See also ==
- Nareen Shammo (born 1986), Yazidi investigative journalist and minority rights activist
- Narin (disambiguation)
