= Hanis =

Hanis may refer to:

- Hani people, from southern China
- Hanis people
- Hanis language
- Hanis, Iran
