= Haykaz =

Haykaz (Armenian: Հայկազ) is an Armenian masculine given name that may refer to the following notable people:

- Haykaz Galstyan (born 1977), Armenian Greco-Roman wrestler
- Haykaz Kostanyan (1898–1938), Soviet Armenian politician
