= Gav Darreh =

Gav Darreh or Gav Dareh (Persian: گاودره) may refer to:

- Gav Darreh, Kurdistan
- Gav Darreh, Zanjan
