= Hoseynabad, Sanandaj =

City in Kurdistan province, Iran

Hoseynabad Persian: حسين آباد
- City
- Location within Iran Location within Iran Kurdistan
- Coordinates: 35°32′56″N 47°07′33″E
- Country: Iran
- Province: Kurdistan
- County: Sanandaj
- District: Hoseynabad

Population (2016)
  - Total: 1,594
- Time zone: UTC+3:30 (IRST)

Hoseynabad (Persian: حسين آباد) (Note: Also romanized as Ḩoseynābād; also known as Husaīnabad) is a city in, and the capital of, Hoseynabad District of Sanandaj County, Kurdistan province, Iran. It also serves as the administrative center for Hoseynabad-e Jonubi Rural District.

== Demographics ==
=== Ethnicity ===
The city is populated by Kurds.

=== Population ===
At the time of the 2006 National Census, Hoseynabad's population was 1,293 in 322 households, when it was a village in Hoseynabad-e Jonubi Rural District of the Central District. The following census in 2011 counted 1,451 people in 366 households. The 2016 census measured the population of the village as 1,594 people in 411 households, by which time the rural district had been separated from the district in the formation of Hoseynabad District. It was the most populous village in its rural district.

After the census, Hoseynabad was elevated to the status of a city.
