= Isaabad =

Isaabad or Isabad or Isi Abad (Persian: عيسي اباد) may refer to various places in Iran:

- Isaabad, Chaharmahal and Bakhtiari
- Isaabad, Kerman
- Isaabad, Rafsanjan, Kerman Province
- Isaabad, Kurdistan
- Isaabad, Sarab Qamish, Kurdistan Province
- Isaabad, Markazi
- Isaabad, Qom
- Isaabad, Dalgan, Sistan and Baluchestan Province
