= Taftileh =

Taftileh تفتيله
- Village
- Location within Iran
- Coordinates: 35°35′14″N 47°05′07″E
- Country: Iran
- Province: Kurdistan
- County: Divandarreh
- Bakhsh: Saral
- Rural District: Hoseynabad-e Shomali

Population (2006)
  - Total: 100
- Time zone: UTC+3:30 (IRST)
  - Summer (DST): UTC+4:30 (IRDT)

Taftileh (Persian: تفتيله, also Romanized as Taftīleh and Teftīleh; also known as Tiftila and Tiftileh) is a village in Hoseynabad-e Shomali Rural District, Saral District, Divandarreh County, Kurdistan Province, Iran. At the 2006 census, its population was 100, in 24 families. The village is populated by Kurds.
