= Qolian =

Qolian or Qolyan (Persian: قليان) may refer to:

- Qolyan, Kurdistan, a village in Kurdistan Province, Iran
- Qolian, Lorestan, a village in Lorestan Province, Iran
