= Qalateh Rashkeh =

Qalateh Rashkeh قلاته رشكه
- Village
- Location within Iran
- Coordinates: 35°38′46″N 46°58′59″E
- Country: Iran
- Province: Kurdistan
- County: Divandarreh
- Bakhsh: Saral
- Rural District: Hoseynabad-e Shomali

Population (2006)
  - Total: 80
- Time zone: UTC+3:30 (IRST)
  - Summer (DST): UTC+4:30 (IRDT)

Qalateh Rashkeh (Persian: قلاته رشكه, also Romanized as Qalāteh Rashkeh and Qalāteh-ye Rashkeh; also known as Doroshkeh, Kala Darashga, Kalāteh Rashkeh, Kalāt-e Tarashkeh, and Qal‘at Tarashka) is a village in Hoseynabad-e Shomali Rural District, Saral District, Divandarreh County, Kurdistan Province, Iran. At the 2006 census, its population was 80, in 14 families. The village is populated by Kurds.
