= Jalal Malaksha =

Kurdish poet (1951–2020)

- جەلال مەلەکشا
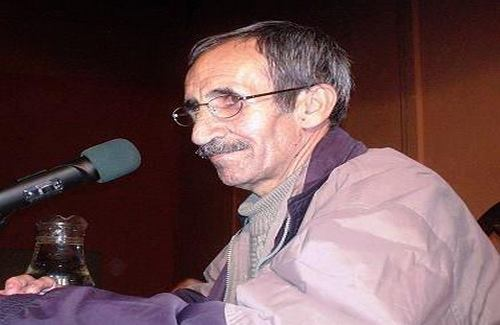
- Born: 1951; Malaksha
- Died: 31 October 2020 (aged 68–69); Sanandaj

Jalal Malaksha (Persian: جلال ملکشا, 1951 – 31 October 2020) was an Iranian Kurdish poet, writer, political activist, translator and journalist.

== Career ==
He wrote poetry in Kurdish (Sorani) and Persian, and his poems have been translated into several languages. Malaksha is considered one of the important Kurdish poets of the late 20th century in Iran. He was born in Malekshan-e Olya, Kurdistan Province, and died in Sanandaj, aged 69. Malaksha was well known during his lifetime. In 2015 a gathering that was planned to be held in commemoration of his works was cancelled by Iranian police in Sanandaj.
