= Berazan =

Berazan or Barazan (Persian: برازان) may refer to:

- Barazan, Kurdistan
- Berazan, West Azerbaijan
