= Kulasah, Kurdistan =

Kulasah كولسه
- Village
- Location within Iran
- Coordinates: 35°11′00″N 46°53′00″E
- Country: Iran
- Province: Kurdistan
- County: Sanandaj
- Bakhsh: Central
- Rural District: Abidar

Population (2006)
  - Total: 29
- Time zone: UTC+3:30 (IRST)
  - Summer (DST): UTC+4:30 (IRDT)

Kulasah (Persian: كولسه, also Romanized as Kūlasah; also known as Kolasah) is a village in Abidar Rural District, in the Central District of Sanandaj County, Kurdistan Province, Iran. At the 2006 census, its population was 29, in 8 families. The village is populated by Kurds.
