= Asavleh, Sanandaj =

Village in Kurdistan province, Iran

Asavleh Persian: آساوله
- Village
- Location within Iran Location within Iran Kurdistan
- Coordinates: 35°17′50″N 47°03′01″E
- Country: Iran
- Province: Kurdistan
- County: Sanandaj
- District: Central
- Rural District: Howmeh

Population (2016)
  - Total: 8,009
- Time zone: UTC+3:30 (IRST)

Asavleh (Persian: آساوله) (Note: Also romanized as Āsāvleh) is a village in Howmeh Rural District of the Central District of Sanandaj County, Kurdistan province, Iran.

== Demographics ==
=== Ethnicity ===
The village is populated by Kurds.

=== Population ===
At the time of the 2006 National Census, the village's population was 1,108 in 263 households. The following census in 2011 counted 3,302 people in 964 households. The 2016 census measured the population of the village as 8,009 people in 2,396 households. It was the most populous village in its rural district.
