= Andarab, Iran =

Andarab (Persian: اندرآب) may refer to:

- Andarab, East Azerbaijan
- Andarab, Kurdistan

== See also ==
- Andarab, a valley in Afghanistan
- Andarabi, a surname
