= Malekshan-e Olya =

Malekshan-e Olya ملكشان عليا
- Village
- Location within Iran
- Coordinates: 35°15′23″N 46°52′07″E
- Country: Iran
- Province: Kurdistan
- County: Sanandaj
- Bakhsh: Central
- Rural District: Abidar

Population (2006)
  - Total: 335
- Time zone: UTC+3:30 (IRST)
  - Summer (DST): UTC+4:30 (IRDT)

Malekshan-e Olya (Persian: ملكشان عليا, also Romanized as Malekshān-e ‘Olyā and Malakshān-e ‘Olyā; also known as Malakshān, Malekshān, and Malekshān-e Bālā) is a village in Abidar Rural District, in the Central District of Sanandaj County, Kurdistan Province, Iran. At the 2006 census, its population was 335, in 82 families. The village is populated by Kurds.
