= Sang-e Sefid, Kermanshah =

Sang-e Sefid سنگسفيد
- Village
- Location within Iran
- Coordinates: 34°15′36″N 47°07′11″E
- Country: Iran
- Province: Kermanshah
- County: Kermanshah
- Bakhsh: Central
- Rural District: Qarah Su

Population (2006)
  - Total: 79
- Time zone: UTC+3:30 (IRST)
  - Summer (DST): UTC+4:30 (IRDT)

Sang-e Sefid (Persian: سنگسفيد, also Romanized as Sang-e Sefīd) is a village in Qarah Su Rural District, in the Central District of Kermanshah County, Kermanshah Province, Iran. At the 2006 census, its population was 79, in 22 families.
