= Narin =

Narin may refer to:

== Places ==
- Narin, County Donegal, a village on the west coast of County Donegal in the Republic of Ireland
- Narin, Slovenia, a village in the Pivka Municipality in Slovenia
- Nahrin District, a district of Baghlan Province

== People ==
- Narin Yakut (born 2004), Turkish women's footballer

== See also ==
- Narine, a given name and surname
