= Kulaseh, Javanrud =

Kulaseh كولسه
- Village
- Location within Iran
- Coordinates: 34°45′41″N 46°26′39″E
- Country: Iran
- Province: Kermanshah
- County: Javanrud
- Bakhsh: Central
- Rural District: Palanganeh

Population (2006)
  - Total: 237
- Time zone: UTC+3:30 (IRST)
  - Summer (DST): UTC+4:30 (IRDT)

Kulaseh (Persian: كولسه, also Romanized as Kūlaseh) is a village in Palanganeh Rural District, in the Central District of Javanrud County, Kermanshah Province, Iran. At the 2006 census, its population was 237, in 46 families.
