= Kashtar =

Kashtar كاشتر
- Village
- Location within Iran
- Coordinates: 35°00′36″N 46°40′22″E
- Country: Iran
- Province: Kurdistan
- County: Kamyaran
- Bakhsh: Central
- Rural District: Zhavehrud

Population (2006)
  - Total: 450
- Time zone: UTC+3:30 (IRST)
  - Summer (DST): UTC+4:30 (IRDT)

Kashtar (Persian: كاشتر, also Romanized as Kāshtar; also known as Khoshkeh Dūl, Khowshdār, and Kushdar) is a village in Zhavehrud Rural District, in the Central District of Kamyaran County, Kurdistan Province, Iran. At the 2006 census, its population was 450, in 113 families. The village is populated by Kurds.
