= Sarab-e Kulasah =

Sarab-e Kulasah سراب كولسه
- Village
- Location within Iran
- Coordinates: 33°54′47″N 46°37′09″E
- Country: Iran
- Province: Kermanshah
- County: Eslamabad-e Gharb
- Bakhsh: Central
- Rural District: Howmeh-ye Jonubi

Population (2006)
  - Total: 29
- Time zone: UTC+3:30 (IRST)
  - Summer (DST): UTC+4:30 (IRDT)

Sarab-e Kulasah (Persian: سراب كولسه, also Romanized as Sarāb-e Kūlasah; also known as Kolasah and Sarāb-e Kūlah Sah) is a village in Howmeh-ye Jonubi Rural District, in the Central District of Eslamabad-e Gharb County, Kermanshah Province, Iran. At the 2006 census, its population was 29, in 8 families.
