= Sang-e Sefid, Qatruyeh =

Sang-e Sefid سنگ سفيد
- Village
- Location within Iran
- Coordinates: 29°00′59″N 54°47′55″E
- Country: Iran
- Province: Fars
- County: Neyriz
- Bakhsh: Qatruyeh
- Rural District: Qatruyeh

Population (2006)
  - Total: 77
- Time zone: UTC+3:30 (IRST)
  - Summer (DST): UTC+4:30 (IRDT)

Sang-e Sefid (Persian: سنگ سفيد, also Romanized as Sang-e Sefīd and Sangsefīd) is a village in Qatruyeh Rural District, Qatruyeh District, Neyriz County, Fars province, Iran. At the 2006 census, its population was 77, in 20 families.
