= List of ministers of social protection of the Armenian Soviet Socialist Republic =

Minister of Social Protection of the Armenian Soviet Socialist Republic (Russian: Министр социальной защиты Армянской Советской Социалистической Республики/Armenian: ՀՀ Սոցիալիստական Հանրապետության Սոցիալական պաշտպանության նախարար) was a government and state position in the Ministry of Social Protection of the Armenian Soviet Socialist Republic or Armenian SSR, the position was formed 1920, when Armenia became part of the Soviet Union. It became important state institution for citizens in the Soviet region.

== Ministers ==
=== Haykaz Arshak Kostanyan (1897–1938) ===
Haykaz Kostanyan (1897–1938)

Haykaz Kostanyan was born in Tbilisi, in 1897. He went to Nersisian school in Tbilisi, studied at Gevorgian Seminary in Etchmiadzin, graduated from the Medical Department of Saratov University. He was a member of the Communist Party, and a member of the RSDRP (Russian Social Democratic Labour Party) since 1916. In 1915–1916, Kostanyan took part in Bolshevik activities in Vagharshapat. He was also appointed the Commissar of Enlightenment in Saratov. In 1920, Haykaz Kostanyan was elected a member of the CPA (Communist Party of Armenia) Foreign Bureau of the Armenian Committee of RCP(b). In 1920–1921, during the Soviet Regime, he was appointed the Armenian SSR People's Commissar of Social Security, then People's Commissar of Internal Affairs. In the years 1923 to 1925, Kostanyan worked in the Central Committee of Georgia, headed the Staff Department of Profintern in Moscow (1925–1928), took part in the Trade Union International Movement, was the first secretary of the Central Committee of the Communist Party of Armenia (1926–1930). From 1931 to 1934, Kostanyan was appointed the first secretary of the Crimea Regional Committee of the Orgburo and the Executive Secretary of Profintern. Moreover, he headed the Political Department of Moscow-Kursk Railway. Haykaz Kostanyan was falsely imprisoned and fusilladed but was subsequently acquitted.

=== Drastamat Asqanaz Ter-Simonyan (1895–1937) ===
Drastamat Ter-Simonyan(1895–1937)

Drastamat Ter-Simonyan, born in the village of Hamamlu (now Spitak), Armenia in the family of social democrats (Hunchakian Party), was a party man, a state figure, a journalist and a publicist. Ter-Simonyan has been a member of RSDRP since 1913. In 1912, he finished Nersisian school in Tbilisi, entered the Department of Economics at the Institute of Commerce in Kiev. During World War I, he carried out organizational activities among soldiers on the Western Front as well as among reserve soldiers of Siberia. After the October Revolution, he worked in the RSFSR People's Commissariat of National Affairs, and in the Supply Area of Red Army starting from September, 1918. In 1913, Drastamat worked for the Students’ social-democratic organization (Bolshevik Faction). In the same year Drastamat Ter-Simonyan was arrested and beaten for having taken part in the demonstration and strike on the occasion of the 100th anniversary of Taras Shevchenko. In 1914, during the Russo-Turkish War he used to make declarations at student meetings against Armenian Volunteer Movements. In 1915, he entered the Subalterns’ College via students’ recruitment, then was sent to the Reserve Regiment, later on to the Front. In late 1919, Drastamat Ter-Simonyan moved to Tbilisi, and only after having participated in the editing and publishing works of such newspapers as “Pahak”, “Nor Ughi”, he came to Armenia. Ter-Simonyan was one of the leaders in the May Rebellion in Armenia against the bourgeois government. In December 1920, Ter-Simonyan was appointed the ArmSSR People's Commissar for Social Security, then People's Commissar of Enlightenment. In summer 1921, Drastamat Ter-Simonyan occupied the position of the Extraordinary Commissar of Zangezur. He held very many positions: Secretary of the Yerevan Committee of Armenian Communist Party, a member of the Presidium, Editor of Parisian newspaper called “Yerevan” (1928), the first Chairman of the Writers’ Union, Editor of the newspaper “Nor Ughi”, Head of the Yerevan City Council and so on. In 1932, Drastamat Ter-Simonyan was appointed the Chief Editor of the Armenian Soviet Encyclopedia. In the academic years 1934 to 1935 and 1935 to 1936, he headed the Chair of Leninism and the Party, as well as read lectures there. On August 10, 1936, he was expelled from the Communist Party by the majority votes of the Central Committee members. Drastamat Ter-Simonyan was falsely imprisoned, yet posthumously acquitted.

=== Arshak Michael Khachikyan (Khachiev) (1874–1935) ===
Arshak Michael Khachikyan(1874–1935)

Arshak Khachikyan was born in Baku, in 1874. He was a professional revolutionary, a party member and a Soviet worker. He started working at tobacco factory at the age of 11, went to school which had only two classes, finished it and started working as a typesetter, then he joined the workmen's group. In 1895, Khachikyan was arrested for having printed anti-government leaflets. In 1901, he became a member of the Social-Democratic grouping organized in Baku. He has been a member of RSDRC since 1902, but was arrested a year after having published illegal materials. He was imprisoned for 6 months and, afterwards was exiled to Central Asia. In 1904, Khachikyan took part in the activities of a small group called Esers in Ashgabat, as a result of which the latter became of a social-democratic orientation. In 1905, Khachikyan was arrested; only after two years of imprisonment he was back to Baku. Later, in 1910, 1913 and 1915, Arshak Khachikyan was rearrested for his revolutionary activities. In 1918, Stepan Shahumyan assigned Khachiev to head the printing industry of Baku. In 1921, being sent to Armenia on a business trip, Khachikyan was appointed the ArmSSR People's Commissar for Social Security (April 1921 – 1923). He was also the Chairman of the Council of Trade Unions of Armenia, a member of the Central Committee of the Communist Party. After the foundation of Transfederation, he moved to Tbilisi and was assigned the authorized Deputy of the Transcaucasia Railway of People's Commissariat of USSR Communication Routes, where he continued working till the end of his life. Arshak Khachikyan died in Tbilisi, in 1935.

=== Khoren Gregory Hovsepyan (1892–1937) ===
Khoren Gregory Hovsepyan (1892–1937)

Khoren Hovsepyan was born in Kirovabad, in 1892. He worked as a pharmacist for eight years. Hovsepyan has been a member of the Communist Party since 1917. In 1904–1911, he studied at secondary school in Kirovabad. In 1917, he passed his pharmaceutical exam at the Medical Faculty of Saratov University and got his degree as a pharmacist's assistant. In the period of 1916–1917, Hovsepyan was the director of a pharmacy, a pharmacist on the Caucasian Front, in the Cities Union of Khoy, Bayazet, Van in Turkey and Persia. From June to December, 1920 Khoren Hovsepyan presided the Bureau of Trade Unions in Kirovabad. Then, till June 1922 he occupied the position of Deputy Chairman of the Council of Trade Unions. Hovsepyan was in charge of food in the army on Ghamaghlu Front (February–June 1921, decision made by the Armenian Revolutionary Committee). Khoren Hovsepyan held the following positions: Deputy People's Commissar of Labor (1922–1923), ArmSSR People's Commissar of Labor and Social Security (1923–1928), Deputy Chairman of State Planning (1928–1931), Chairman of State Planning (1931), President of the Regional Executive Committee in Kapan (1931–1933), Head of Alaverdi Copper Factory (1933–1935), People's Commissar of Local Industry (1935). In 1937, he was removed from the position of People's Commissar as well as from the Party. Khoren Hovsepyan was fusilladed for his counter-revolutionary activities in 1937.

=== Effendi Bala Ibrahimoghly (1893–1938) ===
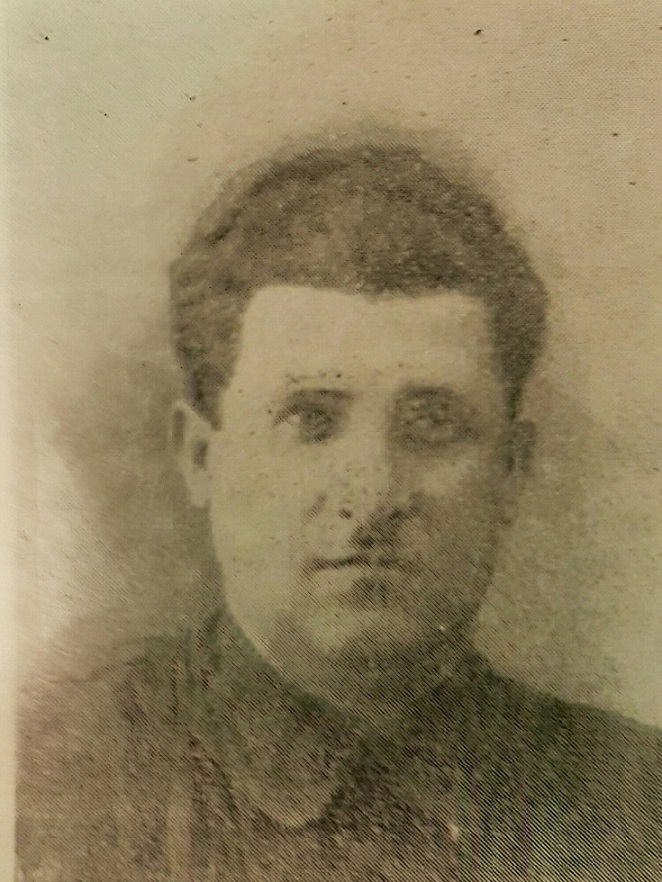
Effendi Bala Ibrahimoghly (1893–1938)

Effendi Bala Ibrahimoghly was born in the village of Chaikend (Dilijan Province). He went to school in Dashkesan from 1907 to 1911. In 1911–1917, he worked in Baku oil wells and joined the Bolshevik Party in 1917. In 1918, Ibrahimoghly undertook various party and soviet activities in the Community of Baku. In 1919, Effendi settled in his hometown. He went back to Azerbaijan in 1920, after the establishment of the Soviet Power and was appointed the Head of the Militia in Gyandga, then the Head of the executive committee of Shamkhor Province. In July 1921, Effendi Bala Ibrahimoghly was sent to Armenia and assigned the Deputy People's Commissar of Internal Affairs. In the period of April 1922 to August 1927, he was the Head of the Turk Department of the Central Committee of the Armenian Communist Party, and the Head of department dealing with National Minorities till May 1928. He held the position of the ArmSSR People's Commissar for Social Security from May 1928 till March 1929. In March 1929, they sent him on a business trip to Azerbaijan. There he occupied various positions. Ibrahimoghly was a member of the ArmSSR Central Executive Committee. He was shot dead in 1938.

=== Ali Taghi-Zade Alioghly (1883–1966) ===
Ali Taghi-Zade Alioghly (1883–1966)

Ali Taghi-zade Alioghly was born in Tbilisi, in 1883. He was a Turk by nationality with no higher education and worked as a painter until 1914. In October 1906, he joined the Bolshevik Party. During the Iranian war, Ali was an agitator and supplied weapons to Iran. In the period of 1907–1908, he was arrested several times for agitation against the monarchy. In 1917–1920, Ali Taghi-zade Alioghly was the secretary of Bolshevik Faction called Adalet. Ali Taghi-zade Alioghly led the sheep cooperative in Tbilisi (1925–1927). He also held the following positions: A member of Supreme Court in Georgia (1927–1928), Head of Transcaucasia State Trade Affairs Department, Georgia (1928–1929), People's Commissar of Labor and Social Affairs in Armenia (1929–1932), a member of Plenum, a member of Bureau of the Central Committee of the Communist party of the ArmSSR. In 1936, he was awarded with a service medal of the ArmSSR Labor Flag. In 1938, he was removed from the party and was arrested as an enemy of the people, a counter-revolutionary. In 1940, Ali Taghi-zade Alioghly was set free because of the case suspension.

=== Artem Poghos Aghamalyan (1882–1937) ===
Artem Poghos Aghamalyan (1882–1937)

Artem Aghamalyan was born in Shushi. He was a locksmith, a laborer. At first, he worked as a forger's pupil, thereupon as a locksmith. In 1917, he became a member of the Communist Party. In 1897, Artem Aghamalyan left for Baku and worked in numerous productions as a locksmith. In 1903, he joined the Hunchakyan Party but in a few years, along with some friends he switched to anarchist-communists. After having worked a year and a half for that organization and having committed eight terroristic acts (he personally killed Jgenia, the former Mayor of Baku) joined the Bolshevik Party in 1907. Thus, he was elected a member of the Regional Committee of the Party. Aghamalyan secretly imported literature and leaflets from Iran. In 1913, Artem Aghmalyan was left out of the Party ranks for some unknown reason. In 1917, he again joined the Communist Party and took an active part in the Civil War of Baku along with the Red Guard. From then on the Party assigned him to transfer large amounts of money and deal with counter-intelligence works. In 1920, Aghamalyan participated in May Revolt in Gyumri and was arrested before the Soviet Union was established. He was elected the Head of the Regional Committee of Gyumri Depot and occupied the post until 1925. In 1925, he moved to Yerevan, was the Vice President of the Chemical Trust, later the Head of the Mechanical Factory. He worked in Dzoraguess, Qanaqerguess. In 1933, Artem Aghamalyan was appointed the People's Commissar of Labor and Social Security and occupied the position till December, 1935. He occupied the position of the Director of Gastronome store branch in Armenia (December 1935). He has been a member of City Council in Gyumri since 1929 and a member of Yerevan City Council since 1935. From 1926 to 1932, Artem Aghamalyan was a member of the Central Committee of the Communist Party in Armenia, a member of the Central Committee Bureau, as well as a member of Transcaucasia CEC (1927–1935), a member of CEC of Armenia starting from 1927. Artem Aghamalyan was fusilladed in 1937.

=== Zorapet Ghukas Galstyan ===
Zorapet Ghukas Galstyan

Zorapet Galstyan was born in the village of Burastan (Artashat Region), in 1902. He went to school in 1914. In 1922, he was elected the President of the Village Council. In 1924, he voluntarily joined the Red Army. In 1925, Galstyan was appointed the Director of Wine Factory of Artashat. In September of the same year he was sent to school of the Soviet Party in Yerevan. So, he finished it in 1926. In the same year Galstyan held the position of the Secretary of the Unity of Committee Members of the sub region Burastan. In 1927, he occupied various positions in the Factory of Canned Food in Yerevan; even took up the post of the Director and Secretary of the Party Bureau. In late 1931, the Central Committee sent him on a business trip to the Institute of Food in Kiev but was finally sent to the Institute of Fruit and Vegetables in Armavir as he did not master Ukrainian. In March 1933, he stopped attending his classes because of the family circumstances. This time they sent him to join the Border Guards. In October of the same year, Zorapet Galstyan was appointed Instructor in charge of CEC. Later on he occupied the following positions: Secretary of Tobacco Factory in Yerevan (1934 – December 1936), Deputy Chairman of the District Council (December 1936), Director of Canned Food Factory (August 1, 1937), ASSR People's Commissar of Food Industry (October 27). Galstyan assigned the Post of the ArmSSR People's Commissar of Labor and Social Security (1938–1952). He was Deputy at the first Convocation of the ArmSSR Supreme Soviet, a Soviet Deputy of Yerevan city from 1947 to 1950. On June 21, 1952, Gastyan was removed from office with severe reprimand. On August 7, 1952, he was appointed the deputy chairman of the executive committee of Yerevan. In December 1954, he became the Acting President of the executive committee of District Soviet of Yerevan workers’ Deputies. In the period of 1960–1961, Zorapet Galstyan took up the post of the Head of the Reception of the ArmSSR Supreme Council Presidency. He has been the Head of the ASSR Supreme Council Presidency Office since 1961. Galstyan retired in 1965.

=== Ghukas Karapet Madoyan (1906–1975) ===
Ghukas Madoyan was born in the village of Ghars (Kars), Ghars Region. He has been a member of the Communist Party since 1925, a Soviet Union Hero. He took part in the May Revolt (1920–1925), served in the Red Army. In 1925–1928, Madoyan worked in the field of Cooperatives and Public Food in the Armenian Soviet Socialistic Republic. Here are the list of positions Ghukas Madoyan once held: Head of Yerevan Labor Cooperative Production (1928–1930), Head of the Department of Yerevan Military Trade (1933–1937), Head of Trade Department of Yerevan main Gastronome (1937–1940), Head of the Department of Yerevan Political Soviet (1945–1946), Deputy Minister of Trade of the ArmSSR (1946). Madoyan was drafted into the army in 1930–1933, as a Company Commander of the Rifle Regiment of Armenia, and in 1940–1945, as a Company Commander, Regiment Commander. He graduated from the Military Academy, was injured. He received numerous medals. In 1946–1948, he attended Party school classes . In the period of 1948–1952, Ghukas Madoyan was the Deputy Minister of the ArmSSR Social Security, and subsequently became the Minister of the ArmSSR Social Security (1952–1961). He worked at the Ministers’ Council of the ArmSSR as an advisor (1961–1975) and was elected Deputy of the Supreme Council four times; correspondingly in 1947, 1951, 1955, 1959. Ghukas Madoyan died in Yerevan, in 1975.

=== Levon Mkhitar Melkonyan (1904–1993) ===
Levon Mkhitar Melkonyan (1904–1993)

Levon Melkonyan was born in the village of Dugnuk (Mush Province, Bitlis Governorate, Western Armenia) into an agriculturist family. In 1914, on the outbreak of the First World War, he had to migrate to Western Armenia and settled down in the village of Arzakan (Akhta Province), later on in the village of Bjni. In 1920–1926, Melkonyan was a member of the Young Communist League. He was elected a member of the Central and Regional Committees of the Young Communist League of Armenia. From 1925 to 1926, he studied at Yerevan Party school. He has been a member of the Communist Party of Armenia since 1926. In the years 1926 to 1927, Melkonyan was appointed Instructor of the CPA Regional Committee of Akhta. In 1927, he entered the Faculty of History at the Transcaucasian Communist University in Tbilisi and graduated in 1931. On returning to Armenia, he started working as Head of the Department of Staff Instruction, Second Secretary in the Party Regional Committees of Tallinn, Ashtarak, then Ghamarlou (Artashat). In the period of 1934–1939, Melkonyan was the second, subsequently the first Secretary of CPA Regional Committee of Kirovakan (present-day Vanadzor). In April 1939, he was appointed Head of the Organizational and Instructional Department at the Central Committee of the Communist Party of Armenia. In February 1940, Melkonyan was removed from his position. Not long afterwards he delivered lectures at Yerevan State University. In the period of 1941–1945, Melkonyan took part in the Great Patriotic War and was awarded with two “Great Patriotic War Medals of the First Degree” (in 1944 and 1945), “Great Patriotic War Medal of the Second Degree” (1944), Red Star badges (1943), Medals “For the Defense of the Caucasus”, “For the Victory over Germany”, “For the Capture of Konigsberg”. After demobilization, Levon Melkonyan presided over Etchmiadzin Sovkhoz (Soviet Farm) after H. Baghramyan over the next 9 years (1945–1954). In late 1953, after the change of the Government, he was back to Yerevan and stayed on as a member of the Government of Armenia for the next 20 years. In 1954, at the All-Union Agricultural Exhibition in Moscow, Sovkhoz was awarded with a car for its achievements, and Melkonyan got a big gold medal. He has worked as Deputy Minister of the State Control of the ArmSSR since January 1955, subsequently as Minister of the State Control of the ArmSSR (1956–1958). Levon Melkonyan also held the following positions: Chairman of the Soviet Control Committee (1958–1961), Minister of Social Security (1961–1974), Deputy of the Arm SSR Supreme Council First Convocation (1938), Deputy of the fifth and the sixth Convocations in 1959 and 1963. He was also a candidate for membership at the Central Committee of the Communist Party of Armenia, member of the Council of Trade Unions. He was awarded with two badges of “Red Flag of Labor” in the years 1967 and 1971. He has been an individual retiree since 1974. Levon Melkonyan died on April 25, 1993, in Yerevan.

=== Ruben Stepan Galstyan ===
Ruben Stepan Galstyan

Ruben Galstyan was born in the village of Sanahin (Tumanyan Region), in 1918. He got his primary education at school after Krupskaya in Yerevan, then at school after Spandaryan in Alaverdi. He finished it in 1935, and entered the Faculty of Chemical Engineering at Yerevan Polytechnic Institute in 1936. In 1941, Galstyan graduated from the Institute and was drafted into the Soviet Army. In January 1942, he was severely wounded, became disabled and was demobilized. Ruben Galstyan started working at Alaverdi Copper-smelting Factory. In 1943, he worked as a technologist at Meat Factory after Mikoyan in Tbilisi, then at the Factory of Organ-therapeutic medications. In 1950, he moved to Yerevan and began working at the Chemical Factory after Kirov. In 1955, Galstyan was elected Secretary of the Combine Party Committee. In 1963, he was elected First Secretary of Lenin's Regional Committee in Yerevan, held the post until 1974. In 1974, he was appointed the Minister of Social Security of the Armenian SSR and occupied the position until 1985. In the years 1956–1973, Ruben Galstyan was elected Deputy at Yerevan City Soviet and Lenin's Regional Soviet. He was elected Deputy of the ArmSSR Supreme Soviet respectively in 1975, 1980 and 1985.

=== Narine Misak Balayan ===
Narine Misak Balayan

Narine Balayan was born in Stepanakert, Nagorno-Karabakh, on June 30, 1940. In 1957–1962, she studied at the Institute of Veterinary Medicine and Animal Husbandry in Yerevan . In 1962–1969, she worked as a precinct master in Yerevan Leather Factory. In 1965, Narine Balayan became a member of the Communist Party. In the period of 1966–1970, she was sent to Moscow for trainings at Moscow Technological Institute of Light Industry and got her Qualification of a leather maker engineer. In 1969–1970, she was the Head of Technical Supervision at Leather Manufacturing unit after Stepan Shahumyan. She was also CP exempt secretary of the same unit. In 1974–1977, she studied at Moscow Higher Party School (present-day Academy of Social Sciences). In the years 1976 to 1982, she chaired the Republican Trade Union Committee of Textile and Light Industry Workers of Armenia. Narine Balayan was the Secretary of Armenia's Republican Trade Union Council (1982–1985). In 1985–1990, she was appointed the Minister of Social Security of Armenia. In 1990, Narine Balayan was appointed Deputy at the first Convocation of the Supreme Council of Armenia; headed the subcommittees of Social Affairs. In 1995–1997, she was Deputy General Director of Russia's Geological Expertise over social issues. From 2000 to 2006, she headed the National Institute of Labor and Social Studies. She has been the Advisor to the RA Minister of Labor and Social Affairs since 2006 until now. Narine Badalyan used to combine state work with public activity. From 1983 to 1991, she was Deputy Head of the Soviet Afro-Asian Solidarity Committee. She has been the Chairman of the Public Charity “Apaven” (Charity and Health Fund) since 1992. She was awarded with medals, certificates of appreciation, orders of “People’s Friendship” and “The Badge of Honor”. She has got certificates issued by international organizations. Narine Badalyan is married, has got two sons and four grandchildren. A lot of constructions were built up throughout the period Narine Badalyan was Minister and Deputy, among them: Palace of Culture and Sport of the Deaf and Dumb, Kharberd Orphanage, German Center of Prosthetics, Red Cross International Spinal Center, “Artmed” Medical Rehabilitation Centre, Ear-Nose-Throat Hospital, Boarding Houses for war and labor veterans and a number of industrial enterprises for the blind and deaf. Moreover, Narine Badalyan is the author of the Collection “Social Security Normative Acts” (1987). She wrote the book “Charity and Health Fund Activity for the Time Period 1992–1997” (1998), the training manual “Sociology” (2002, co-author) and the Methodological Guides “For Social Workers Dealing with the Elderly and Disabled” (2003), “Social Activities with Parents and their Children” (2004) and “Social Work Inside Families” (2005). Narine Badalyan, the Advisor to the RA Minister of Labor and Social Affairs was awarded with Mkhitar Heratsi Medal for long-term and impeccable work on the 19th anniversary of the RA Independence by the RA President Decree made on September 16, 2010.

== See also ==
- Armenian SSR
- Government of Armenia
