= Haykaz Kostanyan =

Soviet Armenian politician (1898–1938)

First Secretary of the Communist Party of Armenia
- In office 8 April 1928 – 7 May 1930
- Preceded by: Hayk Ovsepyan
- Succeeded by: Aghasi Khanjian

Personal details
- Born: 1898 Tbilisi, Russian Empire
- Died: April 21, 1938 (aged 39–40) Moscow, Russian SFSR, Soviet Union
- Party: Russian Communist Party (Bolsheviks) (1916–1937)

Haykaz Arshaki Kostanyan (Armenian: Հայկազ Արշակի Կոստանյան, Russian: Айказ Аркадьевич Костанян; 1898 – 21 April 1938) was a Soviet Armenian politician.

== Biography ==
Kostanyan was born in to an Armenian family in Tbilisi. From 1916, he was a member of the Bolsheviks. in 1916-1917 he studied at the seminary in Etchmiadzin and in 1917–1918 at the Medical Faculty of the University of Saratov but did not graduate.

From March to October 1917, he was a Bolshevik agitator in Balaxanı near Baku. From 1918, he was secretary of the Office of the Armenian Communist Section of the Saratov Committee of the RCP(b), later secretary of the Saratov Department for Nationalities and deputy head of the Saratov Department of National Education. From January to November 1920 he was chairman of the Foreign Office of the Central Committee of the Communist Party (Bolsheviks) of Armenia. In 1920 he was arrested in Tbilisi by the Georgian government but managed to escaped to Baku.

From September 10, 1920, Kostanyan was a member of the Central Committee of the Communist Party of Armenia, from December 7, 1920, People's Commissar of Labor and People's Commissar of Social Security of the Revolutionary Committee of Armenia and later (until 1922), People's Commissar for Internal Affairs of Armenia. From October 1922 to November 30, 1925, he was Secretary of the Central Committee of the Communist Party (Bolsheviks) of Georgia.

From 1925 to April 1928 he was head of the Organizational Department and member of the Secretariat of the Red International of Labor Unions (Profintern). From 1926 to 1928 he studied at the Historical Department of the Institute of Red Professors. from April 8, 1928, to May 7, 1930, Kostanyan was First Secretary of the Central Committee of the Communist Party of Armenia and from May 12 to December 1930 First Secretary of the Crimean Regional Committee of the Communist Party of Ukraine (b). From July 13, 1930, to January 26, 1934, member of the Central Control Commission of the VKP(b). From 1931 to 1934 he was secretary of the Profintern. Later he worked at the People's Commissariat of Communications of the Soviet Union.

On July 10, 1937, Kostanyan was arrested by the NKVD. On April 20, 1938, he was sentenced to death by the Military Collegium of the Supreme Court of the USSR on charges of "membership in acounter-revolutionary terrorist organization", and shot the next day.

On May 9, 1956, he was posthumously rehabilitated.
