= Sang-e Sefid, Sahneh =

Sang-e Sefid سنگ سفيد
- Village
- Location within Iran
- Coordinates: 34°46′40″N 47°10′18″E
- Country: Iran
- Province: Kermanshah
- County: Sahneh
- Bakhsh: Dinavar
- Rural District: Horr

Population (2006)
  - Total: 268
- Time zone: UTC+3:30 (IRST)
  - Summer (DST): UTC+4:30 (IRDT)

Sang-e Sefid (Persian: سنگ سفيد, also Romanized as Sang-e Sefīd) is a village in Horr Rural District, Dinavar District, Sahneh County, Kermanshah Province, Iran. At the 2006 census, its population was 268, in 63 families.
