= Naran Naran =

The Naran
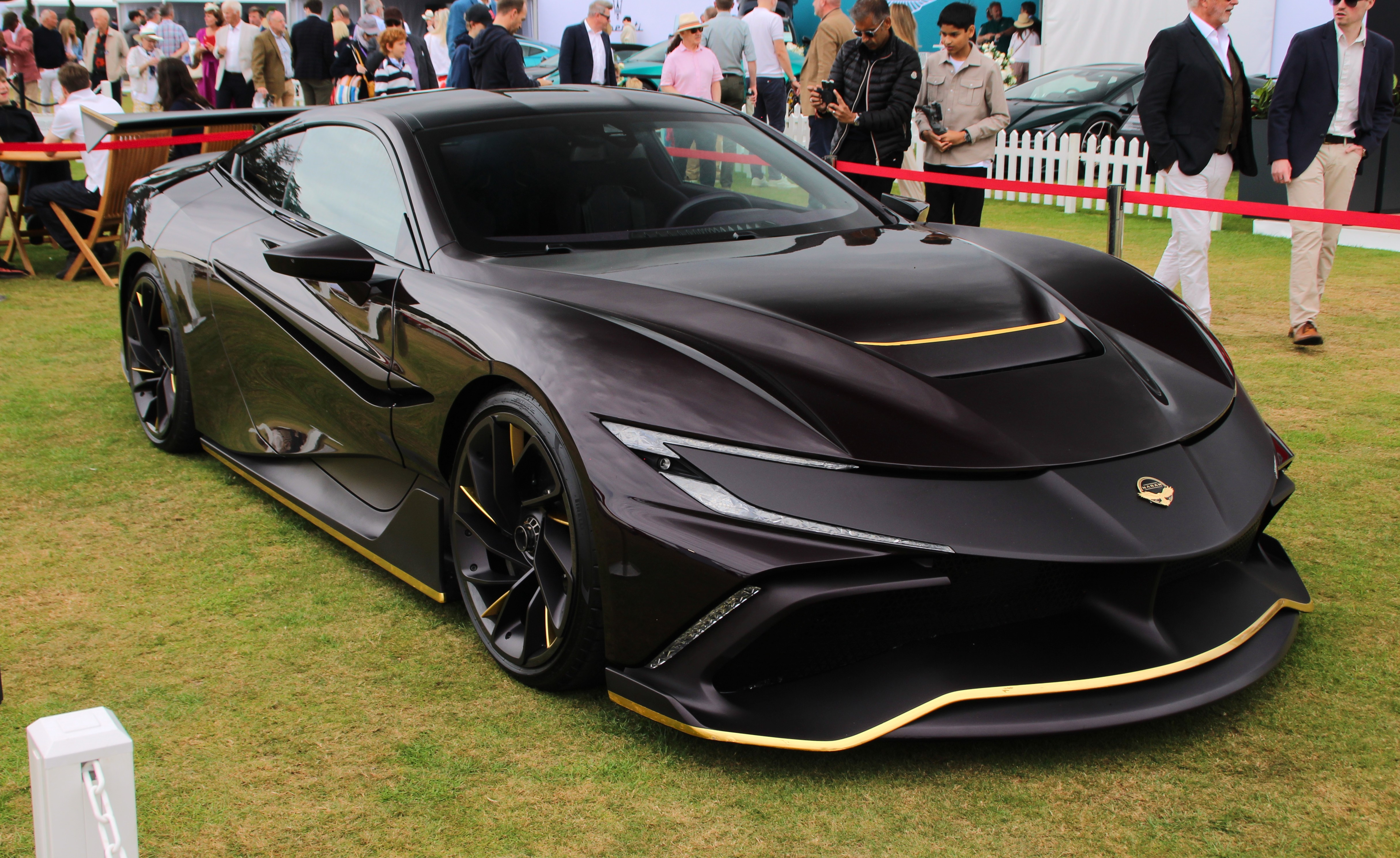

Overview
- Manufacturer: Naran Automotive
- Also called: Naran Hyper Coupe
- Production: 2021– (Limited 39 Units)
- Assembly: Germany
- Designer: Jowyn Wong

Body and chassis
- Class: Grand tourer (S)
- Body style: 2-door 4-Seater coupé
- Layout: Front-mid engine, 4-wheel drive Front-mid engine, Rear-wheel drive
- Doors: 2

Powertrain
- Engine: Bespoke 5.0L S63 V8
- Power output: 781.5 kW (1,062.5 PS; 1,048.0 hp)
- Transmission: 8-Speed ZF 8HP76 Automatic

The Naran, also known as the Naran Hyper Coupe, is a bespoke 2+2 sports car manufactured by U.K.-based automobile manufacturer Naran Automotive.

Unveiled to the public in the late November 2020, it is the first car, and the first one-off limited-edition model built by the brand.

== Specifications ==
The Naran is powered by a bespoke 5-liter twin-turbo V8, made by German firm Racing Dynamics making 1,048 PS (1,034 HP) and 1,036 nm (764 ft-lb) of torque. The engine of the Naran is placed in a front-mid placement, allowing for balanced weight distribution, allowing for the powertrain to switch from 4-wheel drive to rear-wheel drive. All this allows the Naran to go from 0-60 mph in 2.3 seconds, 0-100 mph in 4.5 seconds, and 0-200 mph in 16.5 seconds, with a top speed of more than 230 mph. The Naran also features its carbon-composite body, a hydraulic steering setup, a double-wishbone suspension system, 22-inch hybrid carbon wheels, 390-mm forged carbon-ceramic brakes, and four-way adjustable dampers, with the aerodynamics of the car offering up to a total of 3,036 lbs (1,377 kg) of downforce, all to provide driving dynamics similar to that of a GT3 racecar.

== Design ==
The Naran was designed with the intent to embody a GT3 hypercar that could set fast laps around the Nurburgring. The designer of The Naran, Jowyn Wong, also had previously designed the DeTomaso P72. Most of The Naran's mechanical components are supplied by EY3 Engineering and Daniel Mense, a vehicle dynamics engineer whose experience included working with the development of the NIO EP9.

== Production ==
The Naran is scheduled to go into production in 2025, with deliveries starting in 2027, and with a limited run of 39 units. Upon delivery, customers of the Naran will be able to give it a bespoke name.
