= Hoseynabad District =

District in Kurdistan province, Iran

Hoseynabad District Persian: بخش حسین‌آباد
- District
- Location within Iran Location within Iran Kurdistan
- Coordinates: 35°34′58″N 47°06′20″E
- Country: Iran
- Province: Kurdistan
- County: Sanandaj
- Capital: Hoseynabad

Population (2016)
  - Total: 9,743
- Time zone: UTC+3:30 (IRST)

Hoseynabad District (Persian: بخش حسین‌آباد) is in Sanandaj County, Kurdistan province, Iran. Its capital is the city of Hoseynabad.

== History ==
In 2011, Hoseynabad-e Jonubi Rural District was separated from the Central District, and Hoseynabad-e Shomali Rural District was separated from Saral District of Divandarreh County in the formation of Hoseynabad District. After the 2016 National Census, the village of Hoseynabad was elevated to the status of a city.

== Demographics ==
=== Population ===
At the time of the 2016 census, the district's population was 9,743 inhabitants in 2,748 households.

=== Administrative divisions ===
Hoseynabad District Population
Administrative Divisions	2016
Hoseynabad-e Jonubi RD	6,579
Hoseynabad-e Shomali RD	3,164
Hoseynabad (city) (Note: Became a city after the 2016 census)	
Total	9,743
RD = Rural District
