= Naran-e Olya =

Naran-e Olya ناران عليا
- Village
- Location within Iran
- Coordinates: 29°06′05″N 57°06′37″E
- Country: Iran
- Province: Kerman
- County: Jiroft
- Bakhsh: Sarduiyeh
- Rural District: Sarduiyeh

Population (2006)
  - Total: 148
- Time zone: UTC+3:30 (IRST)
  - Summer (DST): UTC+4:30 (IRDT)

Naran-e Olya (Persian: ناران عليا, also Romanized as Nārān-e ‘Olyā; also known as Nārān and Nūrūn) is a village in Sarduiyeh Rural District, Sarduiyeh District, Jiroft County, Kerman Province, Iran. At the 2006 census, its population was 148, in 34 families.
