= Sirvan District =

District in Kurdistan province, Iran

Sirvan District Persian: بخش سیروان
- District
- Location within Iran Location within Iran Kurdistan
- Coordinates: 35°08′35″N 46°47′07″E
- Country: Iran
- Province: Kurdistan
- County: Sanandaj
- Capital: Darreh Kuleh

Population (2016)
  - Total: 11,008
- Time zone: UTC+3:30 (IRST)

Sirvan District (Persian: بخش سیروان) is in Sanandaj County, Kurdistan province, Iran. Its capital is the village of Darreh Kuleh.

== History ==
In 2011, Zhavarud-e Sharqi Rural District was separated from the Central District in the formation of Sirvan District.

== Demographics ==
=== Population ===
At the time of the 2016 National Census, the district's population was 11,008 inhabitants in 3,327 households.

=== Administrative divisions ===
Sirvan District Population
Administrative Divisions	2016
Miyanrud RD	6,591
Zhavarud-e Sharqi RD	4,417
Total	11,008
RD = Rural District
