= Arandan Rural District =

Rural district in Kurdistan province, Iran

Arandan Rural District Persian: دهستان آرندان
- Rural District
- Location within Iran Location within Iran Kurdistan
- Coordinates: 35°21′35″N 46°53′02″E
- Country: Iran
- Province: Kurdistan
- County: Sanandaj
- District: Central
- Capital: Arandan

Population (2016)
  - Total: 5,458
- Time zone: UTC+3:30 (IRST)

Arandan Rural District (Persian: دهستان آرندان) is in the Central District of Sanandaj County, Kurdistan province, Iran. Its capital is the village of Arandan.

== Demographics ==
=== Population ===
At the time of the 2006 National Census, the rural district's population was 4,012 in 946 households. There were 5,125 inhabitants in 1,360 households at the following census of 2011. The 2016 census measured the population of the rural district as 5,458 in 1,604 households. The most populous of its seven villages was Arandan, with 2,106 people.
