= Sarab Qamish Rural District =

Rural district in Kurdistan province, Iran

Sarab Qamish Rural District Persian: دهستان سراب قاميش
- Rural District
- Location within Iran Location within Iran Kurdistan
- Coordinates: 35°30′24″N 46°50′34″E
- Country: Iran
- Province: Kurdistan
- County: Sanandaj
- District: Central
- Capital: Sarab Qamish

Population (2016)
  - Total: 4,849
- Time zone: UTC+3:30 (IRST)

Sarab Qamish Rural District (Persian: دهستان سراب قاميش) is in the Central District of Sanandaj County, Kurdistan province, Iran. Its capital is the village of Sarab Qamish.

== Demographics ==
=== Population ===
At the time of the 2006 National Census, the rural district's population was 4,719 in 1,034 households. There were 4,785 inhabitants in 1,225 households at the following census of 2011. The 2016 census measured the population of the rural district as 4,849 in 1,340 households. The most populous of its 22 villages was Sarab Qamish, with 1,901 people.
