= Zhavarud-e Sharqi Rural District =

Rural district in Kurdistan province, Iran

Zhavarud-e Sharqi Rural District Persian: دهستان ژاورود شرقي
- Rural District
- Location within Iran Location within Iran Kurdistan
- Coordinates: 35°11′35″N 46°48′36″E
- Country: Iran
- Province: Kurdistan
- County: Sanandaj
- District: Sirvan
- Capital: Turivar

Population (2016)
  - Total: 4,417
- Time zone: UTC+3:30 (IRST)

Zhavarud-e Sharqi Rural District (Persian: دهستان ژاورود شرقي) is in Sirvan District of Sanandaj County, Kurdistan province, Iran. Its capital is the village of Turivar.

== Demographics ==
=== Population ===
At the time of the 2006 National Census, the rural district's population (as a part of the Central District) was 7,762 in 1,913 households. There were 6,224 inhabitants in 1,844 households at the following census of 2011. The 2016 census measured the population of the rural district as 4,417 in 1,394 households, by which time the rural district had been separated from the district in the formation of Sirvan District. The most populous of its 14 villages was Hah Shamiz, with 1,355 people.
