= Hoseynabad-e Shomali Rural District =

Rural district in Kurdistan province, Iran

Hoseynabad-e Shomali Rural District Persian: دهستان حسين آباد شمالي
- Rural District
- Location within Iran Location within Iran Kurdistan
- Coordinates: 35°38′31″N 47°03′04″E
- Country: Iran
- Province: Kurdistan
- County: Sanandaj
- District: Hoseynabad
- Capital: Baharestan

Population (2016)
  - Total: 3,164
- Time zone: UTC+3:30 (IRST)

Hoseynabad-e Shomali Rural District (Persian: دهستان حسين آباد شمالي) is in Hoseynabad District of Sanandaj County, Kurdistan province, Iran. Its capital is the village of Baharestan. (Note: Formerly Kharkeh)

== Demographics ==
=== Population ===
At the time of the 2006 National Census, the rural district's population (as a part of Saral District in Divandarreh County) was 3,603 in 754 households. There were 3,475 inhabitants in 924 households at the following census of 2011. The 2016 census measured the population of the rural district as 3,164 in 906 households, by which time the rural district had been separated from the county in the formation of Hoseynabad District of Sanandaj County. The most populous of its 14 villages was Baqerabad, with 744 people.
