= Abidar Rural District =

Rural district in Kurdistan province, Iran

Abidar Rural District Persian: دهستان آبیدر
- Rural District
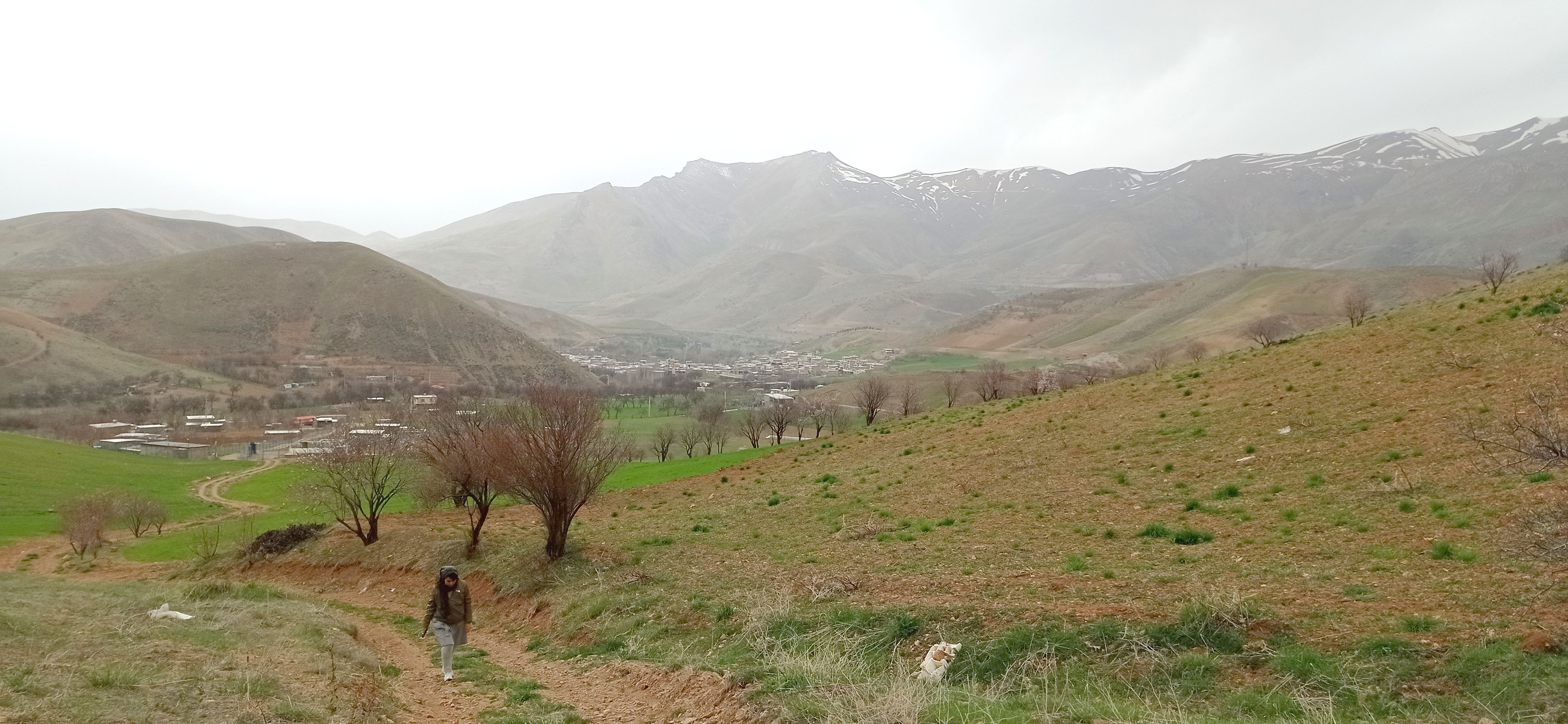
- The village of Kilaneh

- Location within Iran Location within Iran Kurdistan
- Coordinates: 35°14′00″N 46°53′13″E
- Country: Iran
- Province: Kurdistan
- County: Sanandaj
- District: Central
- Capital: Kilaneh

Population (2016)
  - Total: 5,921
- Time zone: UTC+3:30 (IRST)

Abidar Rural District (Persian: دهستان آبیدر) is in the Central District of Sanandaj County, Kurdistan province, Iran. Its capital is the village of Kilaneh. The previous capital of the rural district was village of Hasanabad.

== Demographics ==
=== Population ===
At the time of the 2006 National Census, the rural district's population was 14,274 in 3,535 households. There were 6,693 inhabitants in 1,873 households at the following census of 2011. The 2016 census measured the population of the rural district as 5,921 in 1,751 households. The most populous of its 17 villages was Karju, with 1,942 people.
