= Naran Rural District =

Rural district in Kurdistan province, Iran

Naran Rural District Persian: دهستان نران
- Rural District
- Location within Iran Location within Iran Kurdistan
- Coordinates: 35°08′26″N 47°00′36″E
- Country: Iran
- Province: Kurdistan
- County: Sanandaj
- District: Central
- Capital: Aliabad

Population (2016)
  - Total: 3,686
- Time zone: UTC+3:30 (IRST)

Naran Rural District (Persian: دهستان نران) is in the Central District of Sanandaj County, Kurdistan province, Iran. Its capital is the village of Aliabad. The previous capital of the rural district was the village of Anguzhan.

== Demographics ==
=== Population ===
At the time of the 2006 National Census, the rural district's population was 5,754 in 1,401 households. There were 4,943 inhabitants in 1,372 households at the following census of 2011. The 2016 census measured the population of the rural district as 3,686 in 1,136 households. The most populous of its 31 villages was Serenjianeh-ye Sofla, with 683 people.
