= Howmeh Rural District (Sanandaj County) =

Rural district in Kurdistan province, Iran

Howmeh Rural District Persian: دهستان حومه
- Rural District
- Location within Iran Location within Iran Kurdistan
- Coordinates: 35°20′49″N 47°02′53″E
- Country: Iran
- Province: Kurdistan
- County: Sanandaj
- District: Central
- Capital: Salavatabad

Population (2016)
  - Total: 28,597
- Time zone: UTC+3:30 (IRST)

Howmeh Rural District (Persian: دهستان حومه) is in the Central District of Sanandaj County, Kurdistan province, Iran. Its capital is the village of Salavatabad.

== Demographics ==
=== Population ===
At the time of the 2006 National Census, the rural district's population was 31,304 in 7,720 households. There were 20,066 inhabitants in 5,707 households at the following census of 2011. The 2016 census measured the population of the rural district as 28,597 in 8,596 households. The most populous of its 22 villages was Asavleh, with 8,009 people.
