= Hoseynabad-e Jonubi Rural District =

Rural district in Kurdistan province, Iran

Hoseynabad-e Jonubi Rural District Persian: دهستان حسين آباد جنوبي
- Rural District
- Location within Iran Location within Iran Kurdistan
- Coordinates: 35°33′26″N 47°06′20″E
- Country: Iran
- Province: Kurdistan
- County: Sanandaj
- District: Hoseynabad
- Capital: Hoseynabad

Population (2016)
  - Total: 6,579
- Time zone: UTC+3:30 (IRST)

Hoseynabad-e Jonubi Rural District (Persian: دهستان حسين آباد جنوبي) is in Hoseynabad District of Sanandaj County, Kurdistan province, Iran. It is administered from the city of Hoseynabad.

== Demographics ==
=== Population ===
At the time of the 2006 National Census, the rural district's population (as a part of the Central District) was 7,467 in 1,763 households. There were 6,787 inhabitants in 1,780 households at the following census of 2011. The 2016 census measured the population of the rural district as 6,579 in 1,842 households, by which time the rural district had been separated from the Central District in the formation of Hoseynabad District. The most populous of its 27 villages was Hoseynabad (now a city), with 1,594 people.
