= Central District (Sanandaj County) =

District in Kurdistan province, Iran

Central District (Sanandaj County) Persian: بخش مرکزی شهرستان سنندج
- District
- Location within Iran Location within Iran Kurdistan
- Coordinates: 35°19′59″N 46°56′09″E
- Country: Iran
- Province: Kurdistan
- County: Sanandaj
- Capital: Sanandaj

Population (2016)
  - Total: 461,278
- Time zone: UTC+3:30 (IRST)

The Central District of Sanandaj County (Persian: بخش مرکزی شهرستان سنندج) is in Kurdistan province, Iran. Its capital is the city of Sanandaj.

== History ==
In 2011, Hoseynabad-e Jonubi Rural District was separated from the district, and Hoseynabad-e Shomali Rural District was separated from Saral District of Divandarreh County in the formation of Hoseynabad District. Zhavarud-e Sharqi Rural District was separated from the Central District to form Sirvan District.

== Demographics ==
=== Population ===
At the time of the 2006 National Census, the district's population was 386,738 in 99,692 households. The following census in 2011 counted 428,610 people in 121,932 households. The 2016 census measured the population of the district as 461,278 inhabitants in 140,667 households.

=== Administrative divisions ===
Central District (Sanandaj County) Population
Administrative Divisions	2006	2011	2016
Abidar RD	14,274	6,693	5,921
Arandan RD	4,012	5,125	5,458
Hoseynabad-e Jonubi RD (Note: Transferred to Hoseynabad District)	7,467	6,787	
Howmeh RD	31,304	20,066	28,597
Naran RD	5,754	4,943	3,686
Sarab Qamish RD	4,719	4,785	4,849
Zhavarud-e Sharqi RD (Note: Transferred to Sirvan District)	7,762	6,224	
Sanandaj (city)	311,446	373,987	412,767
Total	386,738	428,610	461,278
RD = Rural District
