= Sanandaj County =

County in Kurdistan province, Iran

Sanandaj County Persian: شهرستان سنندج
- County
- Location of Sanandaj County in Kurdistan province

- Location of Kurdistan province in Iran
- Coordinates: 35°22′N 46°53′E
- Country: Iran
- Province: Kurdistan
- Capital: Sanandaj
- Districts: Central, Hoseynabad, Kalatrazan, Sirvan

Population (2016)
  - Total: 501,402
- Time zone: UTC+3:30 (IRST)

Sanandaj County (Persian: شهرستان سنندج) is in Kurdistan province, Iran. Its capital is the city of Sanandaj.

== History ==
In 2011, Hoseynabad-e Jonubi Rural District was separated from the Central District, and Hoseynabad-e Shomali Rural District was separated from Saral District of Divandarreh County in the formation of Hoseynabad District. Zhavarud-e Sharqi Rural District was separated from the Central District to form Sirvan District, including the new Miyanrud Rural District.

After the 2016 National Census, the village of Hoseynabad was elevated to the status of a city.

== Demographics ==
=== Ethnicity ===
The county is populated by ethnic Kurds.

=== Population ===
At the time of the 2006 census, the county's population was 409,628 in 105,247 households. The following census in 2011 counted 450,167 people in 127,699 households. The 2016 census measured the population of the county as 501,402 in 152,532 households.

=== Administrative divisions ===
Sanandaj County's population history and administrative structure over three consecutive censuses are shown in the following table.

Sanandaj County Population
Administrative Divisions	2006	2011	2016
Central District	386,738	428,610	461,278
Abidar RD	14,274	6,693	5,921
Arandan RD	4,012	5,125	5,458
Hoseynabad-e Jonubi RD (Note: Transferred to Hoseynabad District in 2011)	7,467	6,787	
Howmeh RD	31,304	20,066	28,597
Naran RD	5,754	4,943	3,686
Sarab Qamish RD	4,719	4,785	4,849
Zhavarud-e Sharqi RD (Note: Transferred to Sirvan District in 2011)	7,762	6,224	
Sanandaj (city)	311,446	373,987	412,767
Hoseynabad District			9,743
Hoseynabad-e Jonubi RD			6,579
Hoseynabad-e Shomali RD (Note: Transferred from Divandarreh County)			3,164
Hoseynabad (city) (Note: Became a city after the 2016 census)			
Kalatrazan District	22,890	21,557	19,371
Kalatrazan RD	8,196	7,371	6,854
Negel RD	6,739	7,112	6,194
Zhavarud-e Gharbi RD	6,819	5,781	5,021
Shuyesheh (city)	1,136	1,293	1,302
Sirvan District			11,008
Miyan Rud RD			6,591
Zhavarud-e Sharqi RD			4,417
Total	409,628	450,167	501,402
RD = Rural District

== See also ==
Media related to Sanandaj County at Wikimedia Commons
