= Khanaqah (disambiguation) =

A khanaqah is a building for Sufi spiritual retreats.

Khanaqah, Khanqah or Khaneqah or Khaneqa or Khangah or Khaneqeh or Khanaqah, also rendered as Khanegah and Khanakakh, may also refer to:

== Afghanistan ==
- Khanaqa, Arghanj Khwa
- Khanaqa, Yamgan
- Khaneqah, Afghanistan

== Azerbaijan ==
- Xanəgah (disambiguation)

== India ==
- Khanqah-e-Mu'alla, Srinagar, Jammu and Kashmir

== Iran ==
- Khaneqah, Ardabil
- Khaneqah-e Bafrajerd, Ardabil Province
- Khaneqah-e Gilavan, Ardabil Province
- Khaneqah-e Olya, Ardabil
- Khaneqah-e Sadat, Ardabil Province
- Khaneqah-e Sofla, Ardabil
- Khaneqah, Azarshahr, East Azerbaijan Province
- Khaneqah, Heris, East Azerbaijan Province
- Khaneqah, Khoda Afarin, East Azerbaijan Province
- Khaneqah, Maragheh, East Azerbaijan Province
- Khanqah, Mianeh, East Azerbaijan Province
- Khaneqah Kandi, East Azerbaijan Province
- Khaneqah Kolahi, East Azerbaijan Province
- Khaneqah-e Sofla, East Azerbaijan, East Azerbaijan Province
- Khaneqah Bala va Pain, Gilan Province
- Khaneqah Bar, Gilan Province
- Khaneqah, Kermanshah
- Khaneqah-e Olya, Kermanshah
- Khaneqah-e Sofla, Kermanshah
- Khaneqah-e Vosta, Kermanshah Province
- Khaneqah-e Gelin, Kurdistan Province
- Khaneqah-e Hasan Gavgir, Kurdistan Province
- Khaneqah Juju, Kurdistan Province
- Khaneqah-e Razab, Kurdistan Province
- Khaneqah-e Sheykh, Kurdistan Province
- Khanqah, Lorestan
- Khaneqah, Markazi
- Khaneqah, Bardaskan, Razavi Khorasan Province
- Khaneqah, Fariman, Razavi Khorasan Province
- Khanegah, West Azerbaijan
- Khaneqah, Bukan, West Azerbaijan Province
- Khaneqah, Chaypareh, West Azerbaijan Province
- Khaneqah, Khoy, West Azerbaijan Province
- Khaneqah, Mahabad, West Azerbaijan Province
- Khanaqah, Salmas, West Azerbaijan Province
- Khaneqah, Urmia, West Azerbaijan Province
- Khanqah-e Alvaj, West Azerbaijan Province
- Khaneqah Sorkh, West Azerbaijan Province
- Khanqah, Zanjan
- Khaneqah-e Olya (disambiguation)
- Khaneqah-e Sofla (disambiguation)
