= Xanəgah =

Xanəgah or Khanaga or Khanegya may refer to:

- Xanəgah, Ismailli, Azerbaijan
- Xanəgah, Jalilabad, Azerbaijan
- Xanəgah, Khizi, Azerbaijan
- Xanəgah, Lerik, Azerbaijan
- Xanəgah, Nakhchivan (disambiguation)
  - Xanəgah, Julfa, Azerbaijan
  - Xanağa, Azerbaijan
- Xanəgah, Quba, Azerbaijan
- Khanaga, Iran, in Ardabil Province
- Khanagya, Iran, in East Azerbaijan Province

== See also ==
- Khanqah (disambiguation), places in Iran and Afghanistan
