= Vilkij =

Vilkij (Persian: ویلکیج) may refer to:

- Vilkij District
- Vilkij-e Jonubi Rural District
- Vilkij-e Markazi Rural District
- Vilkij-e Shomali Rural District
