= Gordah =

Gordah or Gerdeh or Gordeh (Persian: گرده) may refer to:

- Gerdeh, Ardabil
- Gerdeh Layan, East Azerbaijan Province
- Gordeh, Fars
- Gordah, Hormozgan
- Gerdeh Kohneh, Lorestan Province
- Gerdeh Rural District, in Ardabil Province
