= Khanegeh =

Khanegeh (Persian: خانگه) may refer to:

- Khanegeh, Golestan
- Khanegeh, Lorestan
- Khanegah, West Azerbaijan

== See also ==
- Khanegah
