= Dudaran =

Dudaran or Do Daran (Persian: دودران) may refer to:

- Dudaran, Ardabil
- Do Daran, Hormozgan
- Do Daran, Kerman
