= Ali Bolaghi =

Ali Bolaghi or Alibolaghi (Persian: علي بلاغي) may refer to:

- Ali Bolaghi, Ardabil
- Ali Bolaghi, East Azerbaijan
- Ali Bolaghi, Kermanshah
- Ali Bolaghi, Miandoab, West Azerbaijan Province
- Ali Bolaghi, Salmas, West Azerbaijan Province
