= Yuzbash Mahallehsi =

Village in Ardabil province, Iran

Yuzbash Mahallehsi Persian: يوزباش محله سي
- Village
- Location within Iran
- Coordinates: 38°33′49″N 48°21′51″E
- Country: Iran
- Province: Ardabil
- County: Namin
- District: Central
- Rural District: Gerdeh

Population (2016)
  - Total: 15
- Time zone: UTC+3:30 (IRST)

Yuzbash Mahallehsi (Persian: يوزباش محله سي) (Note: Also romanized as Yūzbāsh Maḥallehsī; also known as Yūzbāshī) is a village in Gerdeh Rural District of the Central District in Namin County, Ardabil province, Iran.

== Demographics ==
=== Population ===
At the time of the 2006 National Census, the village's population was 22 in eight households. The following census in 2011 counted 30 people in 10 households. The 2016 census measured the population of the village as 15 people in six households.
