= Saidabad, Ardabil =

Village in Ardabil province, Iran

Saidabad Persian: سعيداباد
- Village
- Location within Iran
- Coordinates: 38°18′25″N 48°32′06″E
- Country: Iran
- Province: Ardabil
- County: Namin
- District: Vilkij
- Rural District: Vilkij-e Markazi

Population (2016)
  - Total: 246
- Time zone: UTC+3:30 (IRST)

Saidabad (Persian: سعيداباد) (Note: Also romanized as Sa‘īdābād) is a village in Vilkij-e Markazi Rural District of Vilkij District in Namin County, Ardabil province, Iran.

== Demographics ==
=== Population ===
At the time of the 2006 National Census, the village's population was 188 in 43 households. The following census in 2011 counted 150 people in 36 households. The 2016 census measured the population of the village as 246 people in 67 households.
