= Owch Bolagh, Namin =

Village in Ardabil province, Iran

Owch Bolagh Persian: اوچ بلاغ
- Village
- Location within Iran
- Coordinates: 38°30′55″N 48°18′09″E
- Country: Iran
- Province: Ardabil
- County: Namin
- District: Central
- Rural District: Gerdeh

Population (2016)
  - Total: 27
- Time zone: UTC+3:30 (IRST)

Owch Bolagh (Persian: اوچ بلاغ) (Note: Also romanized as Owch Bolāgh and Ūchbolāgh) is a village in Gerdeh Rural District of the Central District in Namin County, Ardabil province, Iran.

== Demographics ==
=== Population ===
At the time of the 2006 National Census, the village's population was 87 in 25 households. The following census in 2011 counted 68 people in 22 households. The 2016 census measured the population of the village as 27 people in seven households.
