= Khalifehlu, Namin =

Village in Ardabil province, Iran

Khalifehlu Persian: خليفه لو
- Village
- Location within Iran
- Coordinates: 38°15′40″N 48°29′40″E
- Country: Iran
- Province: Ardabil
- County: Namin
- District: Vilkij
- Rural District: Vilkij-e Markazi

Population (2016)
  - Total: 474
- Time zone: UTC+3:30 (IRST)

Khalifehlu (Persian: خليفه لو) (Note: Also romanized as Khalīfehlū; also known as Khalfehlū and Khalīfeh Qeshlāqī) is a village in Vilkij-e Markazi Rural District of Vilkij District in Namin County, Ardabil province, Iran.

== Demographics ==
=== Population ===
At the time of the 2006 National Census, the village's population was 457 in 92 households. The following census in 2011 counted 487 people in 135 households. The 2016 census measured the population of the village as 474 people in 138 households.
