= Suha, Iran =

Village in Ardabil province, Iran

Suha Persian: سوها
- Village
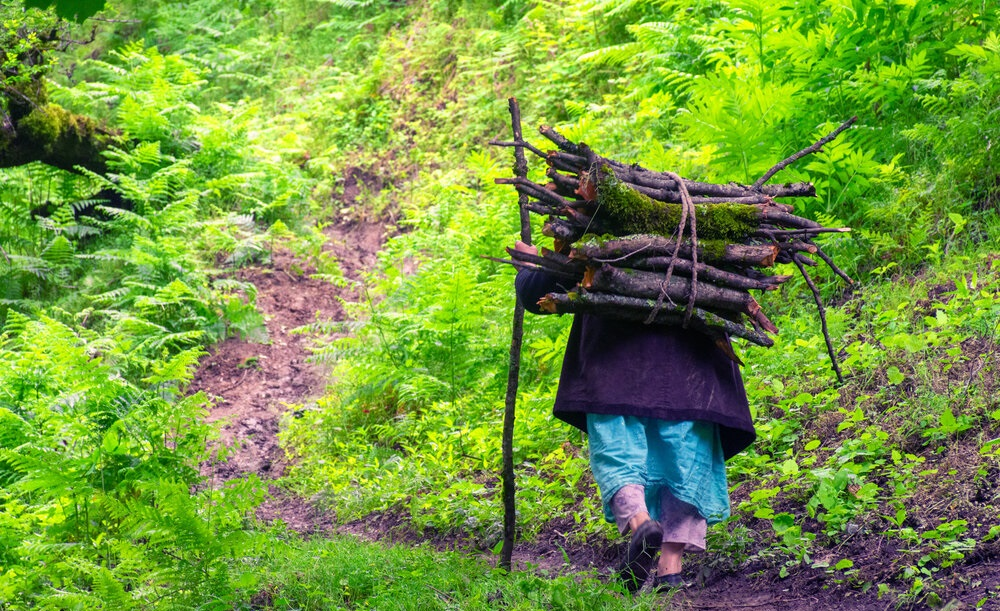
- A woman carrying firewood in the village of Suha

- Location within Iran
- Coordinates: 38°15′33″N 48°38′54″E
- Country: Iran
- Province: Ardabil
- County: Namin
- District: Vilkij
- Rural District: Vilkij-e Markazi

Population (2016)
  - Total: 1,958
- Time zone: UTC+3:30 (IRST)

Suha (Persian: سوها) (Note: Also romanized as Sūhā) is a village in Vilkij-e Markazi Rural District of Vilkij District in Namin County, Ardabil province, Iran.

== Demographics ==
=== Population ===
At the time of the 2006 National Census, the village's population was 1,783 in 345 households. The following census in 2011 counted 1,879 people in 477 households. The 2016 census measured the population of the village as 1,958 people in 582 households. It was the most populous village in its rural district.
