= Aqa Yarlu =

Village in Ardabil province, Iran

Aqa Yarlu Persian: آقایارلو
- Village
- Location within Iran
- Coordinates: 38°33′45″N 48°21′39″E
- Country: Iran
- Province: Ardabil
- County: Namin
- District: Central
- Rural District: Gerdeh

Population (2016)
  - Total: Below reporting threshold
- Time zone: UTC+3:30 (IRST)

Aqa Yarlu (Persian: آقایارلو) (Note: Also romanized as Āqā Yārlū) is a village in Gerdeh Rural District of the Central District in Namin County, Ardabil province, Iran.

== Demographics ==
=== Population ===
At the time of the 2006 National Census, the village's population was 40 in 11 households. The following census in 2011 counted 26 people in eight households. The 2016 census measured the population of the village as below the reporting threshold.
