= Qaleh, Ardabil =

Village in Ardabil province, Iran

Qaleh Persian: قلعه
- Village
- Location within Iran
- Coordinates: 38°33′53″N 48°21′17″E
- Country: Iran
- Province: Ardabil
- County: Namin
- District: Central
- Rural District: Gerdeh

Population (2016)
  - Total: 14
- Time zone: UTC+3:30 (IRST)

Qaleh (Persian: قلعه) (Note: Also romanized as Qal‘eh) is a village in Gerdeh Rural District of the Central District in Namin County, Ardabil province, Iran.

== Demographics ==
=== Population ===
At the time of the 2006 National Census, the village's population was 42 in 11 households. The following census in 2011 counted 20 people in seven households. The 2016 census measured the population of the village as 14 people in five households.
