= Agh Bolagh-e Mostafa Khan =

Village in Ardabil province, Iran

Agh Bolagh-e Mostafa Khan Persian: اغبلاغ مصطفي خان
- Village
- Location within Iran
- Coordinates: 38°16′14″N 48°31′40″E
- Country: Iran
- Province: Ardabil
- County: Namin
- District: Vilkij
- Rural District: Vilkij-e Markazi

Population (2016)
  - Total: 646
- Time zone: UTC+3:30 (IRST)

Agh Bolagh-e Mostafa Khan (Persian: اغبلاغ مصطفي خان) (Note: Also romanized as Āgh Bolāgh-e Moşţafá Khān; also known as Āgh Bolāgh) is a village in Vilkij-e Markazi Rural District of Vilkij District in Namin County, Ardabil province, Iran.

== Demographics ==
=== Population ===
At the time of the 2006 National Census, the village's population was 624 in 140 households. The following census in 2011 counted 705 people in 194 households. The 2016 census measured the population of the village as 646 people in 167 households.
