= Qarah Tappeh, Namin =

Village in Ardabil province, Iran

Qarah Tappeh Persian: قره‌تپه
- Village
- Location within Iran
- Coordinates: 38°15′12″N 48°28′42″E
- Country: Iran
- Province: Ardabil
- County: Namin
- District: Vilkij
- Rural District: Vilkij-e Markazi

Population (2016)
  - Total: 556
- Time zone: UTC+3:30 (IRST)

Qarah Tappeh (Persian: قره‌تپه) (Note: Also known as Qarah Tappeh-ye Sheykhlū) is a village in Vilkij-e Markazi Rural District of Vilkij District in Namin County, Ardabil province, Iran.

== Demographics ==
=== Population ===
At the time of the 2006 National Census, the village's population was 667 in 138 households. The following census in 2011 counted 627 people in 181 households. The 2016 census measured the population of the village as 556 people in 166 households.
