= Yengejeh-ye Molla Mohammad Reza =

Village in Ardabil province, Iran

Yengejeh-ye Molla Mohammad Reza Persian: ینگجه ملامحمدرضا
- Village
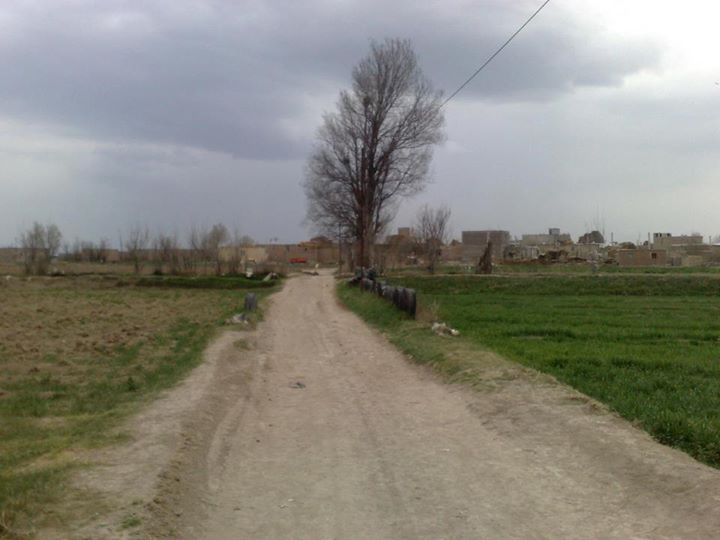
- The village of Yengejeh-ye Molla Mohammad Reza

- Location within Iran
- Coordinates: 38°20′54″N 48°20′38″E
- Country: Iran
- Province: Ardabil
- County: Namin
- District: Central
- Rural District: Dowlatabad

Population (2016)
  - Total: 368
- Time zone: UTC+3:30 (IRST)

Yengejeh-ye Molla Mohammad Reza (Persian: ینگجه ملامحمدرضا) (Note: Also romanized as Yengejeh-ye Mollā Moḩammad Reẕā; also known as Nīkjeh) is a village in Dowlatabad Rural District of the Central District in Namin County, Ardabil province, Iran.

== Demographics ==
=== Population ===
At the time of the 2006 National Census, the village's population was 355 in 97 households. The following census in 2011 counted 465 people in 140 households. The 2016 census measured the population of the village as 368 people in 125 households.
