= Khvoshabad, Ardabil =

Village in Ardabil province, Iran

Khvoshabad Persian: خوش‌آباد
- Village
- Location within Iran
- Coordinates: 38°34′24″N 48°21′39″E
- Country: Iran
- Province: Ardabil
- County: Namin
- District: Central
- Rural District: Gerdeh

Population (2016)
  - Total: 38
- Time zone: UTC+3:30 (IRST)

Khvoshabad (Persian: خوش‌آباد) (Note: Also romanized as Khowshābād and Khvoshābād) is a village in Gerdeh Rural District of the Central District in Namin County, Ardabil province, Iran.

== Demographics ==
=== Population ===
At the time of the 2006 National Census, the village's population was 58 in 20 households. The following census in 2011 counted 52 people in 23 households. The 2016 census measured the population of the village as 38 people in 17 households.
