= Qarah Hasanlu, Ardabil =

Village in Ardabil province, Iran

Qarah Hasanlu Persian: قره حسنلو
- Village
- Location within Iran
- Coordinates: 38°15′12″N 48°27′25″E
- Country: Iran
- Province: Ardabil
- County: Namin
- District: Vilkij
- Rural District: Vilkij-e Markazi

Population (2016)
  - Total: 260
- Time zone: UTC+3:30 (IRST)

Qarah Hasanlu (Persian: قره حسنلو) (Note: Also romanized as Qarah Ḩasanlū) is a village in Vilkij-e Markazi Rural District of Vilkij District in Namin County, Ardabil province, Iran.

== Demographics ==
=== Population ===
At the time of the 2006 National Census, the village's population was 313 in 65 households. The following census in 2011 counted 297 people in 83 households. The 2016 census measured the population of the village as 260 people in 79 households.
