= Agh Zaman Kandi =

Village in Ardabil province, Iran

Agh Zaman Kandi Persian: اغزمان کندی
- Village
- Location within Iran
- Coordinates: 38°23′56″N 48°22′32″E
- Country: Iran
- Province: Ardabil
- County: Namin
- District: Central
- Rural District: Dowlatabad

Population (2016)
  - Total: 89
- Time zone: UTC+3:30 (IRST)

Agh Zaman Kandi (Persian: اغزمان کندی) (Note: Also romanized as Āgh Zamān Kandī; also known as Āq Zamān Golī, Āq Zamān Kandī, and Khashk Sil (‌خشک سیل)) is a village in Dowlatabad Rural District of the Central District in Namin County, Ardabil province, Iran.

== Demographics ==
=== Population ===
At the time of the 2006 National Census, the village's population was 96 in 23 households. The following census in 2011 counted 98 people in 26 households. The 2016 census measured the population of the village as 89 people in 25 households.
