= Arpa Tappehsi =

Village in Ardabil province, Iran

Arpa Tappehsi Persian: ارپاتپه سي
- Village
- Location within Iran
- Coordinates: 38°23′13″N 48°30′56″E
- Country: Iran
- Province: Ardabil
- County: Namin
- District: Central
- Rural District: Vilkij-e Shomali

Population (2016)
  - Total: 134
- Time zone: UTC+3:30 (IRST)

Arpa Tappehsi (Persian: ارپاتپه سي) (Note: Also romanized as Ārpā Tappehsī and Ārpātappahsī; also known as Ārpā Tappeh, Arpatepe, and Meseh Chāy) is a village in Vilkij-e Shomali Rural District of the Central District in Namin County, Ardabil province, Iran.

== Demographics ==
=== Population ===
At the time of the 2006 National Census, the village's population was 130 in 34 households. The following census in 2011 counted 143 people in 44 households. The 2016 census measured the population of the village as 134 people in 43 households.
