= Pirzadeh =

Village in Ardabil province, Iran

Pirzadeh Persian: پيرزاده
- Village
- Location within Iran
- Coordinates: 38°33′53″N 48°21′26″E
- Country: Iran
- Province: Ardabil
- County: Namin
- District: Central
- Rural District: Gerdeh

Population (2016)
  - Total: 22
- Time zone: UTC+3:30 (IRST)

Pirzadeh (Persian: پيرزاده) (Note: Also romanized as Pīrzādeh) is a village in Gerdeh Rural District of the Central District in Namin County, Ardabil province, Iran.

== Demographics ==
=== Population ===
At the time of the 2006 National Census, the village's population was 38 in eight households. The following census in 2011 counted 29 people in seven households. The 2016 census measured the population of the village as 22 people in six households.
