= Mahmudabad, Namin =

Village in Ardabil province, Iran

Mahmudabad Persian: محموداباد
- Village
- Location within Iran
- Coordinates: 38°15′54″N 48°34′51″E
- Country: Iran
- Province: Ardabil
- County: Namin
- District: Vilkij
- Rural District: Vilkij-e Markazi

Population (2016)
  - Total: 952
- Time zone: UTC+3:30 (IRST)

Mahmudabad (Persian: محموداباد) (Note: Also romanized as Maḩmūdābād) is a village in Vilkij-e Markazi Rural District of Vilkij District in Namin County, Ardabil province, Iran.

== Demographics ==
=== Population ===
At the time of the 2006 National Census, the village's population was 903 in 161 households. The following census in 2011 counted 928 people in 244 households. The 2016 census measured the population of the village as 952 people in 251 households.
