= Nowjeh Deh, Ardabil =

Village in Ardabil province, Iran

Nowjeh Deh Persian: نوجه‌ ده
- Village
- Location within Iran
- Coordinates: 38°21′15″N 48°25′17″E
- Country: Iran
- Province: Ardabil
- County: Namin
- District: Central
- Rural District: Dowlatabad

Population (2016)
  - Total: 375
- Time zone: UTC+3:30 (IRST)

Nowjeh Deh (Persian: نوجه‌ده) (Note: Also known as Navādeh, Now Deh, Nuadeh, and Nūjadeh) is a village in Dowlatabad Rural District of the Central District in Namin County, Ardabil province, Iran.

== Demographics ==
=== Population ===
At the time of the 2006 National Census, the village's population was 447 in 99 households. The following census in 2011 counted 428 people in 126 households. The 2016 census measured the population of the village as 375 people in 106 households.
