= Lorun =

Village in Ardabil province, Iran

Lorun Persian: لرون
- Village
- Location within Iran
- Coordinates: 38°28′18″N 48°17′56″E
- Country: Iran
- Province: Ardabil
- County: Namin
- District: Central
- Rural District: Dowlatabad

Population (2016)
  - Total: 85
- Time zone: UTC+3:30 (IRST)

Lorun (Persian: لرون) (Note: Also romanized as Lorūn; also known as Looroon, Lowrūn, Lūrūn, and Owrūn) is a village in Dowlatabad Rural District of the Central District in Namin County, Ardabil province, Iran.

== Demographics ==
=== Population ===
At the time of the 2006 National Census, the village's population was 127 in 31 households. The following census in 2011 counted 130 people in 33 households. The 2016 census measured the population of the village as 85 people in 24 households.
