= Mehdi Posti =

Village in Ardabil province, Iran

Mehdi Posti Persian: مهدي پستي
- Village
- Location within Iran
- Coordinates: 38°19′13″N 48°33′55″E
- Country: Iran
- Province: Ardabil
- County: Namin
- District: Central
- Rural District: Vilkij-e Shomali

Population (2016)
  - Total: 146
- Time zone: UTC+3:30 (IRST)

Mehdi Posti (Persian: مهدي پستي) (Note: Also romanized as Mehdī Postī) is a village in Vilkij-e Shomali Rural District of the Central District in Namin County, Ardabil province, Iran.

== Demographics ==
=== Population ===
At the time of the 2006 National Census, the village's population was 172 in 29 households. The following census in 2011 counted 169 people in 42 households. The 2016 census measured the population of the village as 146 people in 33 households.
