= Arkhazlu =

Village in Ardabil province, Iran

Arkhazlu Persian: ارخازلو
- Village
- Location within Iran
- Coordinates: 38°15′46″N 48°28′22″E
- Country: Iran
- Province: Ardabil
- County: Namin
- District: Vilkij
- Rural District: Vilkij-e Markazi

Population (2016)
  - Total: 700
- Time zone: UTC+3:30 (IRST)

Arkhazlu (Persian: ارخازلو) (Note: Also romanized as Ārkhāzlū) is a village in Vilkij-e Markazi Rural District of Vilkij District in Namin County, Ardabil province, Iran.

== Demographics ==
=== Population ===
At the time of the 2006 National Census, the village's population was 671 in 136 households. The following census in 2011 counted 698 people in 182 households. The 2016 census measured the population of the village as 700 people in 205 households.
