= Saqsolu =

Village in Ardabil province, Iran

Saqsolu Persian: ساقصلو
- Village
- Location within Iran
- Coordinates: 38°21′21″N 48°23′29″E
- Country: Iran
- Province: Ardabil
- County: Namin
- District: Central
- Rural District: Dowlatabad

Population (2016)
  - Total: 624
- Time zone: UTC+3:30 (IRST)

Saqsolu (Persian: ساقصلو) (Note: Also romanized as Sāqşolū) is a village in Dowlatabad Rural District of the Central District in Namin County, Ardabil province, Iran.

== Demographics ==
=== Population ===
At the time of the 2006 National Census, the village's population was 603 in 123 households. The following census in 2011 counted 820 people in 240 households. The 2016 census measured the population of the village as 624 people in 158 households.
