= Yunjalu, Ardabil =

Village in Ardabil province, Iran

Yunjalu Persian: يونجالو
- Village
- Location within Iran
- Coordinates: 38°13′45″N 48°33′25″E
- Country: Iran
- Province: Ardabil
- County: Namin
- District: Vilkij
- Rural District: Vilkij-e Markazi

Population (2016)
  - Total: 545
- Time zone: UTC+3:30 (IRST)

Yunjalu (Persian: يونجالو) (Note: Also romanized as Yūnjālū) is a village in Vilkij-e Markazi Rural District of Vilkij District in Namin County, Ardabil province, Iran.

== Demographics ==
=== Population ===
At the time of the 2006 National Census, the village's population was 836 in 163 households. The following census in 2011 counted 798 people in 208 households. The 2016 census measured the population of the village as 545 people in 147 households.
