= Qeshlaq Chay =

Village in Ardabil province, Iran

Qeshlaq Chay Persian: قشلاق چای
- Village
- Location within Iran
- Coordinates: 38°25′48″N 48°27′18″E
- Country: Iran
- Province: Ardabil
- County: Namin
- District: Central
- Rural District: Gerdeh

Population (2016)
  - Total: 208
- Time zone: UTC+3:30 (IRST)

Qeshlaq Chay (Persian: قشلاق چای) (Note: Also romanized as Qeshlāq Chāy) is a village in Gerdeh Rural District of the Central District in Namin County, Ardabil province, Iran.

== Demographics ==
=== Population ===
At the time of the 2006 National Census, the village's population was 264 in 70 households. The following census in 2011 counted 247 people in 82 households. The 2016 census measured the population of the village as 208 people in 65 households.
