= Dowlatabad, Namin =

Village in Ardabil province, Iran

Dowlatabad Persian: دولت اباد
- Village
- Location within Iran
- Coordinates: 38°22′20″N 48°19′02″E
- Country: Iran
- Province: Ardabil
- County: Namin
- District: Central
- Rural District: Dowlatabad

Population (2016)
  - Total: 1,587
- Time zone: UTC+3:30 (IRST)

Dowlatabad (Persian: دولت اباد) (Note: Also Romanized as Dowlatābād) is a village in, and the capital of, Dowlatabad Rural District in the Central District of Namin County, Ardabil province, Iran.

== Demographics ==
=== Population ===
At the time of the 2006 National Census, the village's population was 1,484 in 330 households. The following census in 2011 counted 1,624 people in 424 households. The 2016 census measured the population of the village as 1,587 people in 442 households. It was the most populous village in its rural district.
