= Pateh Khvor =

Village in Ardabil province, Iran

Pateh Khvor Persian: پته خور
- Village
- Location within Iran
- Coordinates: 38°20′58″N 48°29′34″E
- Country: Iran
- Province: Ardabil
- County: Namin
- District: Central
- Rural District: Vilkij-e Shomali

Population (2016)
  - Total: 372
- Time zone: UTC+3:30 (IRST)

Pateh Khvor (Persian: پته خور) (Note: Also romanized as Pateh Khowr) is a village in Vilkij-e Shomali Rural District of the Central District in Namin County, Ardabil province, Iran.

== Demographics ==
=== Population ===
At the time of the 2006 National Census, the village's population was 414 in 85 households. The following census in 2011 counted 358 people in 101 households. The 2016 census measured the population of the village as 372 people in 105 households.
