= Tappeh, Namin =

Village in Ardabil province, Iran

Tappeh Persian: تپه
- Village
- Location within Iran
- Coordinates: 38°24′38″N 48°22′02″E
- Country: Iran
- Province: Ardabil
- County: Namin
- District: Central
- Rural District: Dowlatabad

Population (2016)
  - Total: 15
- Time zone: UTC+3:30 (IRST)

Tappeh (Persian: تپه) is a village in Dowlatabad Rural District of the Central District in Namin County, Ardabil province, Iran.

== Demographics ==
=== Population ===
At the time of the 2006 National Census, the village's population was 20 in five households. The following census in 2011 counted 18 people in five households. The 2016 census measured the population of the village as 15 people in four households.
