= Owlaghan =

Village in Ardabil province, Iran

Owlaghan Persian: اولاغان
- Village
- Location within Iran
- Coordinates: 38°19′04″N 48°28′51″E
- Country: Iran
- Province: Ardabil
- County: Namin
- District: Central
- Rural District: Vilkij-e Shomali

Population (2016)
  - Total: 112
- Time zone: UTC+3:30 (IRST)

Owlaghan (Persian: اولاغان) (Note: Also romanized as Owlāghān and Ūlāghān) is a village in Vilkij-e Shomali Rural District of the Central District in Namin County, Ardabil province, Iran.

== Demographics ==
=== Population ===
At the time of the 2006 National Census, the village's population was 114 in 23 households. The following census in 2011 counted 124 people in 28 households. The 2016 census measured the population of the village as 112 people in 28 households.
