= Gowdlar =

Village in Ardabil province, Iran

Gowdlar Persian: گودلر
- Village
- Location within Iran
- Coordinates: 38°33′39″N 48°20′26″E
- Country: Iran
- Province: Ardabil
- County: Namin
- District: Central
- Rural District: Gerdeh

Population (2016)
  - Total: 24
- Time zone: UTC+3:30 (IRST)

Gowdlar (Persian: گودلر) is a village in Gerdeh Rural District of the Central District in Namin County, Ardabil province, Iran.

== Demographics ==
=== Population ===
At the time of the 2006 National Census, the village's population was 27 in seven households. The following census in 2011 counted 22 people in eight households. The 2016 census measured the population of the village as 24 people in nine households.
