= Kolosh =

Village in Ardabil province, Iran

Kolosh Persian: كلش
- Village
- Location within Iran
- Coordinates: 38°30′30″N 48°28′39″E
- Country: Iran
- Province: Ardabil
- County: Namin
- District: Anbaran
- Rural District: Minabad

Population (2016)
  - Total: 457
- Time zone: UTC+3:30 (IRST)

Kolosh (Persian: كلش) is a village in Minabad Rural District of Anbaran District in Namin County, Ardabil province, Iran.

== Demographics ==
=== Population ===
At the time of the 2006 National Census, the village's population was 744 in 224 households. The following census in 2011 counted 551 people in 198 households. The 2016 census measured the population of the village as 457 people in 183 households.
