= Yajlu =

Village in Ardabil province, Iran

Yajlu Persian: ياجلو
- Village
- Location within Iran
- Coordinates: 38°25′36″N 48°19′35″E
- Country: Iran
- Province: Ardabil
- County: Namin
- District: Central
- Rural District: Dowlatabad

Population (2016)
  - Total: 146
- Time zone: UTC+3:30 (IRST)

Yajlu (Persian: ياجلو) (Note: Also romanized as Yājlū) is a village in Dowlatabad Rural District of the Central District in Namin County, Ardabil province, Iran.

== Demographics ==
=== Population ===
At the time of the 2006 National Census, the village's population was 360 in 71 households. The following census in 2011 counted 200 people in 54 households. The 2016 census measured the population of the village as 146 people in 39 households.
