= Mirza Rahimlu =

Village in Ardabil province, Iran

Mirza Rahimlu Persian: ميرزارحيملو
- Village
- Location within Iran
- Coordinates: 38°16′26″N 48°26′53″E
- Country: Iran
- Province: Ardabil
- County: Namin
- District: Vilkij
- Rural District: Vilkij-e Markazi

Population (2016)
  - Total: 52
- Time zone: UTC+3:30 (IRST)

Mirza Rahimlu (Persian: ميرزارحيملو) (Note: Also romanized as Mīrzā Raḩīmlū) is a village in Vilkij-e Markazi Rural District of Vilkij District in Namin County, Ardabil province, Iran.

== Demographics ==
=== Population ===
At the time of the 2006 National Census, the village's population was 51 in 12 households. The following census in 2011 counted 41 people in 12 households. The 2016 census measured the population of the village as 52 people in 16 households.
