= Tighiyeh =

Village in Ardabil province, Iran

Tighiyeh Persian: تيغيه
- Village
- Location within Iran
- Coordinates: 38°10′50″N 48°39′23″E
- Country: Iran
- Province: Ardabil
- County: Namin
- District: Vilkij
- Rural District: Vilkij-e Jonubi

Population (2016)
  - Total: 183
- Time zone: UTC+3:30 (IRST)

Tighiyeh (Persian: تيغيه) (Note: also romanized as Tīghīyeh) is a village in Vilkij-e Jonubi Rural District of Vilkij District in Namin County, Ardabil province, Iran.

== Demographics ==
=== Population ===
At the time of the 2006 National Census, the village's population was 215 in 44 households. The following census in 2011 counted 216 people in 64 households. The 2016 census measured the population of the village as 183 people in 50 households.
