= Solut =

Village in Ardabil province, Iran

Solut Persian: سلوط
- Village
- Location within Iran
- Coordinates: 38°24′20″N 48°26′16″E
- Country: Iran
- Province: Ardabil
- County: Namin
- District: Central
- Rural District: Gerdeh

Population (2016)
  - Total: 130
- Time zone: UTC+3:30 (IRST)

Solut (Persian: سلوط) (Note: Also romanized as Solūţ) is a village in Gerdeh Rural District of the Central District in Namin County, Ardabil province, Iran.

== Demographics ==
=== Population ===
At the time of the 2006 National Census, the village's population was 208 in 60 households. The following census in 2011 counted 240 people in 82 households. The 2016 census measured the population of the village as 130 people in 44 households.
