= Hoshneh =

Village in Ardabil province, Iran

Hoshneh Persian: هشنه
- Village
- Location within Iran
- Coordinates: 38°34′16″N 48°22′30″E
- Country: Iran
- Province: Ardabil
- County: Namin
- District: Central
- Rural District: Gerdeh

Population (2016)
  - Total: 58
- Time zone: UTC+3:30 (IRST)

Hoshneh (Persian: هشنه) is a village in Gerdeh Rural District of the Central District in Namin County, Ardabil province, Iran.

== Demographics ==
=== Population ===
At the time of the 2006 National Census, the village's population was 94 in 27 households. The following census in 2011 counted 114 people in 35 households. The 2016 census measured the population of the village as 58 people in 21 households.
