= Saleh Qeshlaqi =

Village in Ardabil province, Iran

Saleh Qeshlaqi Persian: صالح قشلاقي
- Village
- Location within Iran
- Coordinates: 38°33′24″N 48°20′01″E
- Country: Iran
- Province: Ardabil
- County: Namin
- District: Central
- Rural District: Gerdeh

Population (2016)
  - Total: 45
- Time zone: UTC+3:30 (IRST)

Saleh Qeshlaqi (Persian: صالح قشلاقي) (Note: Also romanized as Şāleḩ Qeshlāqī; also known as Sālār Qeshlāq and Şāleḩ Qeshlāq) is a village in Gerdeh Rural District of the Central District in Namin County, Ardabil province, Iran.

== Demographics ==
=== Population ===
At the time of the 2006 National Census, the village's population was 39 in 14 households. The following census in 2011 counted 30 people in 11 households. The 2016 census measured the population of the village as 45 people in 14 households.
