= Hur, Ardabil =

Village in Ardabil province, Iran

Hur Persian: حور
- Village
- Location within Iran
- Coordinates: 38°12′11″N 48°39′09″E
- Country: Iran
- Province: Ardabil
- County: Namin
- District: Vilkij
- Rural District: Vilkij-e Jonubi

Population (2016)
  - Total: 3,248
- Time zone: UTC+3:30 (IRST)

Hur (Persian: حور) (Note: Also romanized as Ḩūr) is a village in, and the capital of, Vilkij-e Jonubi Rural District in Vilkij District of Namin County, Ardabil province, Iran.

== Demographics ==
=== Population ===
At the time of the 2006 National Census, the village's population was 3,141 in 644 households. The following census in 2011 counted 3,415 people in 937 households. The 2016 census measured the population of the village as 3,248 people in 955 households. It was the most populous village in its rural district.
