= Minabad =

Minabad (Persian: مين اباد) may refer to:

- Minabad, Ardabil
- Minabad, Hamadan
- Minabad, Kurdistan
- Minabad, South Khorasan
- Minabad Rural District, in Ardabil Province
