= Suli Daraq, Ardabil =

Village in Ardabil province, Iran

Suli Daraq Persian: سوليدرق
- Village
- Location within Iran
- Coordinates: 38°26′08″N 48°30′02″E
- Country: Iran
- Province: Ardabil
- County: Namin
- District: Central
- Rural District: Vilkij-e Shomali

Population (2016)
  - Total: 55
- Time zone: UTC+3:30 (IRST)

Suli Daraq (Persian: سوليدرق) (Note: Also romanized as Sūlī Daraq; also known as Sūl Daraq) is a village in Vilkij-e Shomali Rural District of the Central District in Namin County, Ardabil province, Iran.

== Demographics ==
=== Population ===
At the time of the 2006 National Census, the village's population was 88 in 24 households. The following census in 2011 counted 55 people in 18 households. The 2016 census measured the population of the village as 55 people in 21 households.
