= Gelan Daraq-e Sofla =

Village in Ardabil province, Iran

Gelan Daraq-e Sofla Persian: گلندرق سفلی
- Village
- Location within Iran
- Coordinates: 38°29′29″N 48°22′00″E
- Country: Iran
- Province: Ardabil
- County: Namin
- District: Central
- Rural District: Gerdeh

Population (2016)
  - Total: 57
- Time zone: UTC+3:30 (IRST)

Gelan Daraq-e Sofla (Persian: گلندرق سفلی) (Note: Also romanized as Gelan Daraq-e Soflá; also known as Kolandaraq-e Pā’īn and Kūlān Daraq-e Pā’īn) is a village in Gerdeh Rural District of the Central District in Namin County, Ardabil province, Iran.

== Demographics ==
=== Population ===
At the time of the 2006 National Census, the village's population was 74 in 17 households. The following census in 2011 counted 64 people in 22 households. The 2016 census measured the population of the village as 57 people in 19 households.
