= Marani, Iran =

Village in Ardabil province, Iran

Marani Persian: مرنی
- Village
- Location within Iran
- Coordinates: 38°14′51″N 48°32′12″E
- Country: Iran
- Province: Ardabil
- County: Namin
- District: Vilkij
- Rural District: Vilkij-e Markazi

Population (2016)
  - Total: 929
- Time zone: UTC+3:30 (IRST)

Marani (Persian: مرنی) (Note: Also romanized as Maranī and Meranī; also known as Mīranī and Mirni) is a village in Vilkij-e Markazi Rural District of Vilkij District in Namin County, Ardabil province, Iran.

== Demographics ==
=== Population ===
At the time of the 2006 National Census, the village's population was 1,065 in 217 households. The following census in 2011 counted 1,095 people in 332 households. The 2016 census measured the population of the village as 929 people in 273 households.
