= Dovarjin =

Village in Ardabil province, Iran

Dovarjin Persian: دورجين
- Village
- Location within Iran
- Coordinates: 38°18′09″N 48°33′17″E
- Country: Iran
- Province: Ardabil
- County: Namin
- District: Vilkij
- Rural District: Vilkij-e Markazi

Population (2016)
  - Total: 128
- Time zone: UTC+3:30 (IRST)

Dovarjin (Persian: دورجين) (Note: Also romanized as Doorjin, Dovarjīn, and Dūrjīn; also known as Lamājīn) is a village in Vilkij-e Markazi Rural District of Vilkij District in Namin County, Ardabil province, Iran.

== Demographics ==
=== Population ===
At the time of the 2006 National Census, the village's population was 232 in 46 households. The following census in 2011 counted 158 people in 34 households. The 2016 census measured the population of the village as 128 people in 30 households.
