= Anbaran-e Olya =

Village in Ardabil province, Iran

Anbaran-e Olya Persian: عنبران عليا
- Village
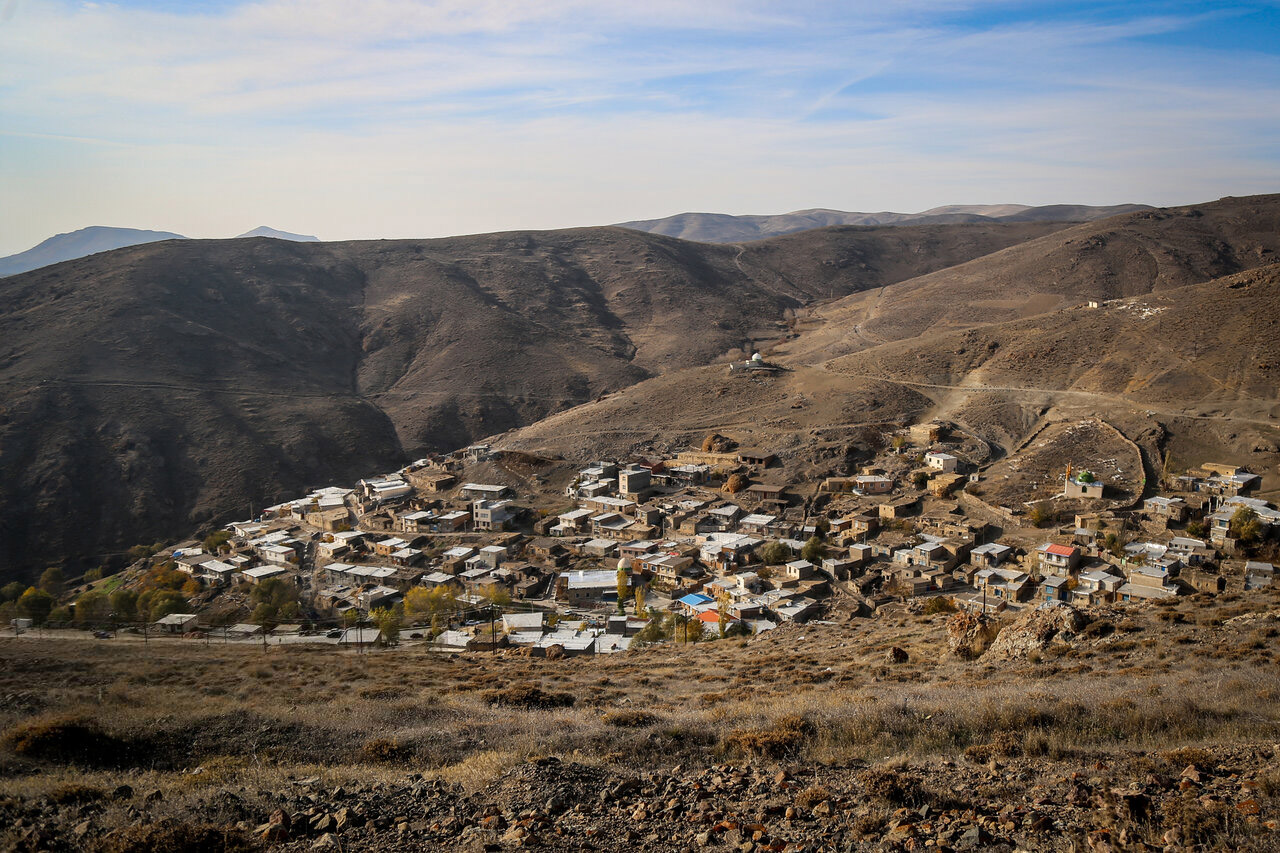

- Location within Iran
- Coordinates: 38°32′17″N 48°27′39″E
- Country: Iran
- Province: Ardabil
- County: Namin
- District: Anbaran
- Rural District: Anbaran

Population (2016)
  - Total: 933
- Time zone: UTC+3:30 (IRST)

Anbaran-e Olya (Persian: عنبران عليا) (Note: Also romanized as ‘Anbarān-e ‘Olyā; also known as ‘Anbarān-e Bālā) is a village in Anbaran Rural District of Anbaran District in Namin County, Ardabil province, Iran.

== Demographics ==
=== Population ===
At the time of the 2006 National Census, the village's population wa 706 in 183 households. The following census in 2011 counted 549 people in 177 households. The 2016 census measured the population of the village as 933 people in 312 households. It was the most populous village in its rural district.
