= Yeznabad =

Village in Ardabil province, Iran

Yeznabad Persian: یزن‌آباد
- Village
- Location within Iran
- Coordinates: 38°23′55″N 48°20′27″E
- Country: Iran
- Province: Ardabil
- County: Namin
- District: Central
- Rural District: Dowlatabad

Population (2016)
  - Total: 688
- Time zone: UTC+3:30 (IRST)

Yeznabad (Persian: يزن اباد) (Note: Also romanized as Yeznābād; also Azerbaijani: Yezna Abad) is a village in Dowlatabad Rural District of the Central District in Namin County, Ardabil province, Iran. Farming is the main occupation of the village.

== Etymology ==
The name of the village is probably derived from the Azerbaijani words yezna (meaning groom) and abad (meaning city).

== Demographics ==
=== Language ===
People speak Azerbaijani in Yeznabad.

=== Population ===
At the time of the 2006 National Census, the village's population was 1,041 in 208 households. The following census in 2011 counted 985 people in 269 households. The 2016 census measured the population of the village as 688 people in 184 households. In recent years, the population of the village has drastically decreased due to immigration to bigger cities.
