= Khaneqah-e Sofla =

Khaneqah-e Sofla (Persian: خانقاه سفلي) may refer to:

- Khaneqah-e Sofla, Ardabil
- Khaneqah-e Sofla, East Azerbaijan
- Khaneqah-e Sofla, Kermanshah
