= Sula, Iran =

Village in Ardabil province, Iran

Sula Persian: سولا
- Village
- Location within Iran
- Coordinates: 38°23′09″N 48°28′54″E
- Country: Iran
- Province: Ardabil
- County: Namin
- District: Central
- Rural District: Vilkij-e Shomali

Population (2016)
  - Total: 373
- Time zone: UTC+3:30 (IRST)

Sula (Persian: سولا) (Note: Also romanized as Soola and Sūlā) is a village in Vilkij-e Shomali Rural District of the Central District in Namin County, Ardabil province, Iran.

== Demographics ==
=== Population ===
At the time of the 2006 National Census, the village's population was 576 in 146 households. The following census in 2011 counted 481 people in 150 households. The 2016 census measured the population of the village as 373 people in 123 households.
