= Jablu =

Village in Ardabil province, Iran

Jablu Persian: جابلو
- Village
- Location within Iran
- Coordinates: 38°17′23″N 48°29′49″E
- Country: Iran
- Province: Ardabil
- County: Namin
- District: Vilkij
- Rural District: Vilkij-e Markazi

Population (2016)
  - Total: 193
- Time zone: UTC+3:30 (IRST)

Jablu (Persian: جابلو) (Note: Also romanized as Jāblū; also known as Ḩāblū) is a village in Vilkij-e Markazi Rural District of Vilkij District in Namin County, Ardabil province, Iran.

== Demographics ==
=== Population ===
At the time of the 2006 National Census, the village's population was 263 in 55 households. The following census in 2011 counted 206 people in 52 households. The 2016 census measured the population of the village as 193 people in 53 households.
