= Masjed-e Mahalleh =

Village in Ardabil province, Iran

Masjed-e Mahalleh Persian: مسجدمحله
- Village
- Location within Iran
- Coordinates: 38°33′55″N 48°21′43″E
- Country: Iran
- Province: Ardabil
- County: Namin
- District: Central
- Rural District: Gerdeh

Population (2016)
  - Total: 112
- Time zone: UTC+3:30 (IRST)

Masjed-e Mahalleh (Persian: مسجدمحله) (Note: Also romanized as Masjed Maḩallehsī and Masjed-e Maḩalleh) is a village in Gerdeh Rural District of the Central District in Namin County, Ardabil province, Iran.

== Demographics ==
=== Population ===
At the time of the 2006 National Census, the village's population was 43 in 15 households. The following census in 2011 counted 95 people in 33 households. The 2016 census measured the population of the village as 112 people in 39 households.
