= Nazar Ali Kandi =

Village in Ardabil province, Iran

Nazar Ali Kandi Persian: نظرعلی کندی
- Village
- Location within Iran
- Coordinates: 38°34′19″N 48°23′02″E
- Country: Iran
- Province: Ardabil
- County: Namin
- District: Central
- Rural District: Gerdeh

Population (2016)
  - Total: Below reporting threshold
- Time zone: UTC+3:30 (IRST)

Nazar Ali Kandi (Persian: نظرعلی کندی) (Note: Also romanized as Naz̧ar ‘Alī Kandī) is a village in Gerdeh Rural District of the Central District in Namin County, Ardabil province, Iran.

== Demographics ==
=== Population ===
At the time of the 2006 National Census, the village's population was 11 in six households. The following census in 2011 counted a population below the reporting threshold. The 2016 census again measured the population of the village as below the reporting threshold.
