= Kenazaq =

Village in Ardabil province, Iran

Kenazaq Persian: كنازق
- Village
- Location within Iran
- Coordinates: 38°22′02″N 48°27′05″E
- Country: Iran
- Province: Ardabil
- County: Namin
- District: Central
- Rural District: Vilkij-e Shomali

Population (2016)
  - Total: 40
- Time zone: UTC+3:30 (IRST)

Kenazaq (Persian: كنازق) (Note: Also romanized as Kenāzaq; also known as Kenāzeh) is a village in Vilkij-e Shomali Rural District of the Central District in Namin County, Ardabil province, Iran.

== Demographics ==
=== Population ===
At the time of the 2006 National Census, the village's population was 48 in 13 households. The following census in 2011 counted 63 people in 21 households. The 2016 census measured the population of the village as 40 people in 16 households.
