= Jeyd =

Village in Ardabil province, Iran

Jeyd Persian: جيد
- Village
- Location within Iran
- Coordinates: 38°28′50″N 48°28′59″E
- Country: Iran
- Province: Ardabil
- County: Namin
- District: Anbaran
- Rural District: Minabad

Population (2016)
  - Total: 754
- Time zone: UTC+3:30 (IRST)

Jeyd (Persian: جيد) is a village in Minabad Rural District of Anbaran District in Namin County, Ardabil province, Iran.

== Demographics ==
=== Population ===
At the time of the 2006 National Census, the village's population was 1,015 in 232 households. The following census in 2011 counted 849 people in 223 households. The 2016 census measured the population of the village as 754 people in 211 households.
