= Saqqezchi =

Saqqezchi (Persian: سقزچي) may refer to:

- Saqqezchi, Namin, Ardabil Province
- Saqqezchi, Nir, Ardabil Province
- Saqqezchi, East Azerbaijan
