= Tazeh Kand-e Loqmanabad =

Village in Ardabil province, Iran

Tazeh Kand-e Loqmanabad Persian: تازه كندلقمان اباد
- Village
- Location within Iran
- Coordinates: 38°17′23″N 48°30′00″E
- Country: Iran
- Province: Ardabil
- County: Namin
- District: Vilkij
- Rural District: Vilkij-e Markazi

Population (2016)
  - Total: 46
- Time zone: UTC+3:30 (IRST)

Tazeh Kand-e Loqmanabad (Persian: تازه كندلقمان اباد) (Note: Also romanized as Tāzeh Kand-e Loqmānābād; also known as Tāzeh Kand) is a village in Vilkij-e Markazi Rural District of Vilkij District in Namin County, Ardabil province, Iran.

== Demographics ==
=== Population ===
At the time of the 2006 National Census, the village's population was 55 in 12 households. The following census in 2011 counted 44 people in 13 households. The 2016 census measured the population of the village as 46 people in 15 households.
