= Raz, Ardabil =

Village in Ardabil province, Iran

Raz Persian: رز
- Village
- Location within Iran
- Coordinates: 38°11′49″N 48°37′53″E
- Country: Iran
- Province: Ardabil
- County: Namin
- District: Vilkij
- Rural District: Vilkij-e Jonubi

Population (2016)
  - Total: 213
- Time zone: UTC+3:30 (IRST)

Raz (Persian: رز) is a village in Vilkij-e Jonubi Rural District of Vilkij District in Namin County, Ardabil province, Iran.

== Demographics ==
=== Population ===
At the time of the 2006 National Census, the village's population was 310 in 60 households. The following census in 2011 counted 280 people in 75 households. The 2016 census measured the population of the village as 213 people in 55 households.
