= Aladizgeh =

Village in Ardabil province, Iran

Aladizgeh Persian: الاديزگه
- Village
- Location within Iran
- Coordinates: 38°17′02″N 48°35′18″E
- Country: Iran
- Province: Ardabil
- County: Namin
- District: Vilkij
- Rural District: Vilkij-e Markazi

Population (2016)
  - Total: 1,850
- Time zone: UTC+3:30 (IRST)

Aladizgeh (Persian: الاديزگه) (Note: Also romanized as Ālādīzgeh) is a village in Vilkij-e Markazi Rural District of Vilkij District in Namin County, Ardabil province, Iran.

== Demographics ==
=== Population ===
At the time of the 2006 National Census, the village's population was 1,540 in 266 households. The following census in 2011 counted 1,642 people in 389 households. The 2016 census measured the population of the village as 1,850 people in 443 households.
