= Qelich Qeshlaqi =

Village in Ardabil province, Iran

Qelich Qeshlaqi Persian: قلیچ قشلاقی
- Village
- Location within Iran
- Coordinates: 38°30′56″N 48°17′36″E
- Country: Iran
- Province: Ardabil
- County: Namin
- District: Central
- Rural District: Gerdeh

Population (2016)
  - Total: 35
- Time zone: UTC+3:30 (IRST)

Qelich Qeshlaqi (Persian: قلیچ قشلاقی) (Note: Also romanized as Qelīch Qeshlāqī; also known as Qelench Qeshlāq, Qelenj Qeshlāq (قلنج قشلاق), and Qelīch Qeshlāq) is a village in Gerdeh Rural District of the Central District in Namin County, Ardabil province, Iran.

== Demographics ==
=== Population ===
At the time of the 2006 National Census, the village's population was 69 in 13 households. The following census in 2011 counted 53 people in 15 households. The 2016 census measured the population of the village as 35 people in 12 households.
