= Jegar Kandi =

Village in Ardabil province, Iran

Jegar Kandi Persian: جگركندي
- Village
- Location within Iran
- Coordinates: 38°22′13″N 48°28′31″E
- Country: Iran
- Province: Ardabil
- County: Namin
- District: Central
- Rural District: Vilkij-e Shomali

Population (2016)
  - Total: 38
- Time zone: UTC+3:30 (IRST)

Jegar Kandi (Persian: جگركندي) (Note: Also romanized as Jegar Kandī) is a village in Vilkij-e Shomali Rural District of the Central District in Namin County, Ardabil province, Iran.

== Demographics ==
=== Population ===
At the time of the 2006 National Census, the village's population was 52 in 14 households. The following census in 2011 counted 58 people in 22 households. The 2016 census measured the population of the village as 38 people in 11 households.
