= Owranj =

Village in Ardabil province, Iran

Owranj Persian: اورنج
- Village
- Location within Iran
- Coordinates: 38°27′13″N 48°22′45″E
- Country: Iran
- Province: Ardabil
- County: Namin
- District: Central
- Rural District: Gerdeh

Population (2016)
  - Total: 221
- Time zone: UTC+3:30 (IRST)

Owranj (Persian: اورنج) (Note: Also romanized as Owranj and Ūranj) is a village in Gerdeh Rural District of the Central District in Namin County, Ardabil province, Iran.

== Demographics ==
=== Population ===
At the time of the 2006 National Census, the village's population was 352 in 84 households. The following census in 2011 counted 347 people in 106 households. The 2016 census measured the population of the village as 221 people in 69 households.
