= Now Deh, Namin =

Village in Ardabil province, Iran

Now Deh Persian: نوده
- Village
- Location within Iran
- Coordinates: 38°25′58″N 48°31′56″E
- Country: Iran
- Province: Ardabil
- County: Namin
- District: Central
- Rural District: Vilkij-e Shomali

Population (2016)
  - Total: 39
- Time zone: UTC+3:30 (IRST)

Now Deh (Persian: نوده) is a village in Vilkij-e Shomali Rural District of the Central District in Namin County, Ardabil province, Iran.

== Demographics ==
=== Population ===
At the time of the 2006 National Census, the village's population was 63 in 20 households. The following census in 2011 counted 36 people in 16 households. The 2016 census measured the population of the village as 39 people in 16 households.
