= Garm Cheshmeh =

Village in Ardabil province, Iran

Garm Cheshmeh Persian: گرم چشمه
- Village
- Location within Iran
- Coordinates: 38°15′50″N 48°36′50″E
- Country: Iran
- Province: Ardabil
- County: Namin
- District: Vilkij
- Rural District: Vilkij-e Markazi

Population (2016)
  - Total: 1,114
- Time zone: UTC+3:30 (IRST)

Garm Cheshmeh (Persian: گرم چشمه) (Note: Also known as Garmeh Cheshmeh (گرمه چشمه)) is a village in Vilkij-e Markazi Rural District of Vilkij District in Namin County, Ardabil province, Iran.

== Demographics ==
=== Population ===
At the time of the 2006 National Census, the village's population was 966 in 214 households. The following census in 2011 counted 1,056 people in 318 households. The 2016 census measured the population of the village as 1,114 people in 308 households.
