= Pir Javar =

Village in Ardabil province, Iran

Pir Javar Persian: پيرجوار
- Village
- Location within Iran
- Coordinates: 38°32′59″N 48°21′55″E
- Country: Iran
- Province: Ardabil
- County: Namin
- District: Central
- Rural District: Gerdeh

Population (2016)
  - Total: Below reporting threshold
- Time zone: UTC+3:30 (IRST)

Pir Javar (Persian: پيرجوار) (Note: Also romanized as Pīr Javār; also known as Pīr Javād) is a village in Gerdeh Rural District of the Central District in Namin County, Ardabil province, Iran.

== Demographics ==
=== Population ===
At the time of the 2006 National Census, the village's population was 28 in nine households. The following census in 2011 counted 16 people in seven households. The 2016 census measured the population of the village as below the reporting threshold.
