= Gollu =

Village in Ardabil province, Iran

Gollu Persian: گللو
- Village
- Location within Iran
- Coordinates: 38°19′45″N 48°30′45″E
- Country: Iran
- Province: Ardabil
- County: Namin
- District: Central
- Rural District: Vilkij-e Shomali

Population (2016)
  - Total: 527
- Time zone: UTC+3:30 (IRST)

Gollu (Persian: گللو) (Note: Also romanized as Gollū; also known as Kolālū) is a village in Vilkij-e Shomali Rural District of the Central District in Namin County, Ardabil province, Iran.

== Demographics ==
=== Population ===
At the time of the 2006 National Census, the village's population was 610 in 127 households. The following census in 2011 counted 568 people in 153 households. The 2016 census measured the population of the village as 527 people in 155 households.
