= Sarband, Ardabil =

Village in Ardabil province, Iran

Sarband Persian: سربند
- Village
- Location within Iran
- Coordinates: 38°21′55″N 48°23′34″E
- Country: Iran
- Province: Ardabil
- County: Namin
- District: Central
- Rural District: Dowlatabad

Population (2016)
  - Total: 205
- Time zone: UTC+3:30 (IRST)

Sarband (Persian: سربند) is a village in Dowlatabad Rural District of the Central District in Namin County, Ardabil province, Iran.

== Demographics ==
=== Population ===
At the time of the 2006 National Census, the village's population was 181 in 41 households. The following census in 2011 counted 163 people in 45 households. The 2016 census measured the population of the village as 205 people in 57 households.
