= Mirzanaq =

Village in Ardabil province, Iran

Mirzanaq Persian: ميرزانق
- Village
- Location within Iran
- Coordinates: 38°28′52″N 48°30′37″E
- Country: Iran
- Province: Ardabil
- County: Namin
- District: Anbaran
- Rural District: Minabad

Population (2016)
  - Total: 501
- Time zone: UTC+3:30 (IRST)

Mirzanaq (Persian: ميرزانق) (Note: Also romanized as Mīrzānaq; also known as Mīrrānaq) is a village in Minabad Rural District of Anbaran District in Namin County, Ardabil province, Iran.

== Demographics ==
=== Population ===
At the time of the 2006 National Census, the village's population was 555 in 112 households. The following census in 2011 counted 478 people in 124 households. The 2016 census measured the population of the village as 501 people in 134 households.
