= Qeshlaq-e Pelazir =

Village in Ardabil province, Iran

Qeshlaq-e Pelazir Persian: قشلاق پلازير
- Village
- Location within Iran
- Coordinates: 38°32′06″N 48°24′29″E
- Country: Iran
- Province: Ardabil
- County: Namin
- District: Anbaran
- Rural District: Anbaran

Population (2016)
  - Total: 125
- Time zone: UTC+3:30 (IRST)

Qeshlaq-e Pelazir (Persian: قشلاق پلازير) (Note: Also romanized as Qeshlāq-e Pīlāz̄īr; also known as Pīlarz) is a village in Anbaran Rural District of Anbaran District in Namin County, Ardabil province, Iran.

== Demographics ==
=== Population ===
At the time of the 2006 National Census, the village's population was 24 in nine households. The following census in 2011 counted 72 people in 21 households. The 2016 census measured the population of the village as 125 people in 37 households.
