= Ali Kamar =

Village in Ardabil province, Iran

Ali Kamar Persian: علی کمر
- Village
- Location within Iran
- Coordinates: 38°30′41″N 48°19′52″E
- Country: Iran
- Province: Ardabil
- County: Namin
- District: Central
- Rural District: Gerdeh

Population (2016)
  - Total: 56
- Time zone: UTC+3:30 (IRST)

Ali Kamr (Persian: علی کمر) (Note: Also romanized as ‘Alī Kamr) is a village in Gerdeh Rural District of the Central District in Namin County, Ardabil province, Iran.

== Demographics ==
=== Population ===
At the time of the 2006 National Census, the village's population was 40 in 13 households. The following census in 2011 counted 38 people in 13 households. The 2016 census measured the population of the village as 56 people in 21 households.
