= Buyaqchilu =

Village in Ardabil province, Iran

Buyaqchilu Persian: بویاقچی‌لو
- Village
- Location within Iran
- Coordinates: 38°31′42″N 48°18′32″E
- Country: Iran
- Province: Ardabil
- County: Namin
- District: Central
- Rural District: Gerdeh

Population (2016)
  - Total: 49
- Time zone: UTC+3:30 (IRST)

Buyaqchilu (Persian: بویاقچی‌لو) (Note: Also romanized as Būyāqchīlū; also known as Būyāghchelū) is a village in Gerdeh Rural District of the Central District in Namin County, Ardabil province, Iran.

== Demographics ==
=== Population ===
At the time of the 2006 National Census, the village's population was 76 in 21 households. The following census in 2011 counted 90 people in 28 households. The 2016 census measured the population of the village as 49 people in 17 households.
