= Qeshlaq-e Sarabad =

Village in Ardabil province, Iran

Qeshlaq-e Sarabad Persian: قشلاق سراباد
- Village
- Location within Iran
- Country: Iran
- Province: Ardabil
- County: Namin
- District: Anbaran
- Rural District: Anbaran

Population (2016)
  - Total: 138
- Time zone: UTC+3:30 (IRST)

Qeshlaq-e Sarabad (Persian: قشلاق سراباد) (Note: Also romanized as Qeshlāq-e Sarābād) is a village in Anbaran Rural District of Anbaran District in Namin County, Ardabil province, Iran.

== Demographics ==
=== Population ===
At the time of the 2006 National Census, the village's population was 77 in 16 households. The following census in 2011 counted 145 people in 36 households. The 2016 census measured the population of the village as 138 people in 43 households.
