= Dagermandaraq =

Village in Ardabil province, Iran

Dagermandaraq Persian: دگرماندرق
- Village
- Location within Iran
- Coordinates: 38°20′02″N 48°32′52″E
- Country: Iran
- Province: Ardabil
- County: Namin
- District: Central
- Rural District: Vilkij-e Shomali

Population (2016)
  - Total: 554
- Time zone: UTC+3:30 (IRST)

Dagermandaraq (Persian: دگرماندرق) (Note: Also romanized as Dagermāndaraq) is a village in Vilkij-e Shomali Rural District of the Central District in Namin County, Ardabil province, Iran.

== Demographics ==
=== Population ===
At the time of the 2006 National Census, the village's population was 518 in 103 households. The following census in 2011 counted 555 people in 125 households. The 2016 census measured the population of the village as 554 people in 143 households.
