= Seyfabad, Ardabil =

Village in Ardabil province, Iran

Seyfabad Persian: سيف اباد
- Village
- Location within Iran
- Coordinates: 38°25′00″N 48°24′25″E
- Country: Iran
- Province: Ardabil
- County: Namin
- District: Central
- Rural District: Gerdeh

Population (2016)
  - Total: Below reporting threshold
- Time zone: UTC+3:30 (IRST)

Seyfabad (Persian: سيف اباد) (Note: Also romanized as Seyfābād; also known as Āq Dāshī) is a village in Gerdeh Rural District of the Central District in Namin County, Ardabil province, Iran.

== Demographics ==
=== Population ===
At the time of the 2006 National Census, the village's population was 28 in six households. The following census in 2011 counted a population below the reporting threshold. The 2016 census again measured the population of the village as below the reporting threshold.
