= Kolleh Sar, Namin =

Village in Ardabil province, Iran

Kolleh Sar Persian: كله سر
- Village
- Location within Iran
- Coordinates: 38°20′32″N 48°32′21″E
- Country: Iran
- Province: Ardabil
- County: NIR
- District: Central
- Rural District: Vilkij-e Shomali

Population (2016)
  - Total: 932
- Time zone: UTC+3:30 (IRST)

Kolleh Sar (Persian: كله سر) (Note: Also known as Kalesar, Kelāsar and Kolā Sar) is a village in Vilkij-e Shomali Rural District of the Central District in Namin County, Ardabil province, Iran.

== Demographics ==
=== Population ===
At the time of the 2006 National Census, the village's population was 1,176 in 280 households. The following census in 2011 counted 1,165 people in 340 households. The 2016 census measured the population of the village as 932 people in 295 households.
