= Khan Kandi, Namin =

Village in Ardabil province, Iran

Khan Kandi Persian: خان‌کندی
- Village
- Location within Iran
- Coordinates: 38°22′47″N 48°27′05″E
- Country: Iran
- Province: Ardabil
- County: Namin
- District: Central
- Rural District: Gerdeh

Population (2016)
  - Total: 161
- Time zone: UTC+3:30 (IRST)

Khan Kandi (Persian: خان‌کندی) (Note: Also romanized as Khān Kandī; also known as Khānazar and Khānīverdī) is a village in Gerdeh Rural District of the Central District in Namin County, Ardabil province, Iran.

== Demographics ==
=== Population ===
At the time of the 2006 National Census, the village's population was 278 in 58 households. The following census in 2011 counted 203 people in 48 households. The 2016 census measured the population of the village as 161 people in 42 households.
