= Iril =

Village in Ardabil province, Iran

Iril Persian: ايريل
- Village
- Location within Iran
- Coordinates: 38°13′25″N 48°34′45″E
- Country: Iran
- Province: Ardabil
- County: Namin
- District: Vilkij
- Rural District: Vilkij-e Markazi

Population (2016)
  - Total: 318
- Time zone: UTC+3:30 (IRST)

Iril (Persian: ايريل) (Note: Also romanized as Īrīl) is a village in Vilkij-e Markazi Rural District of Vilkij District in Namin County, Ardabil province, Iran.

== Demographics ==
=== Population ===
At the time of the 2006 National Census, the village's population was 346 in 67 households. The following census in 2011 counted 298 people in 67 households. The 2016 census measured the population of the village as 318 people in 89 households.
