= Fath-e Maqsud =

Village in Ardabil province, Iran

Fath-e Maqsud Persian: فتح مقصود
- Village
- Location within Iran
- Coordinates: 38°35′52″N 48°25′05″E
- Country: Iran
- Province: Ardabil
- County: Namin
- District: Central
- Rural District: Gerdeh

Population (2016)
  - Total: 25
- Time zone: UTC+3:30 (IRST)

Fath-e Maqsud (Persian: فتح مقصود) (Note: Also romanized as Fatḩ-e Maqşūd) is a village in Gerdeh Rural District of the Central District in Namin County, Ardabil province, Iran.

== Demographics ==
=== Population ===
At the time of the 2006 National Census, the village's population was 48 in eight households. The following census in 2011 counted 43 people in 10 households. The 2016 census measured the population of the village as 25 people in eight households.
