= Yengejeh, Namin =

Village in Ardabil province, Iran

Yengejeh Persian: ينگجه
- Village
- Location within Iran
- Coordinates: 38°21′57″N 48°28′33″E
- Country: Iran
- Province: Ardabil
- County: Namin
- District: Central
- Rural District: Vilkij-e Shomali

Population (2016)
  - Total: 22
- Time zone: UTC+3:30 (IRST)

Yengejeh (Persian: ينگجه) (Note: Also known as Nīgejeh') is a village in Vilkij-e Shomali Rural District of the Central District in Namin County, Ardabil province, Iran.

== Demographics ==
=== Population ===
At the time of the 2006 National Census, the village's population was 45 in six households. The following census in 2011 counted 22 people in five households. The 2016 census measured the population of the village as 22 people in six households.
