= Khashheyran =

Village in Ardabil province, Iran

Khashheyran Persian: خشحيران
- Village
- Location within Iran
- Coordinates: 38°26′44″N 48°31′57″E
- Country: Iran
- Province: Ardabil
- County: Namin
- District: Central
- Rural District: Vilkij-e Shomali

Population (2016)
  - Total: 61
- Time zone: UTC+3:30 (IRST)

Khashheyran (Persian: خشحيران) (Note: Also known as Khasheh Heyran, Khasheh Ḩeyrān, and Khashīrān) is a village in Vilkij-e Shomali Rural District of the Central District in Namin County, Ardabil province, Iran.

== Demographics ==
=== Population ===
At the time of the 2006 National Census, the village's population was 152 in 35 households. The following census in 2011 counted 95 people in 28 households. The 2016 census measured the population of the village as 61 people in 20 households.
