= Novashnaq =

Village in Ardabil province, Iran

Novashnaq Persian: نوشنق
- Village
- Location within Iran
- Coordinates: 38°25′26″N 48°23′03″E
- Country: Iran
- Province: Ardabil
- County: Namin
- District: Central
- Rural District: Gerdeh

Population (2016)
  - Total: 293
- Time zone: UTC+3:30 (IRST)

Novashnaq (Persian: نوشنق) (Note: Also known as Noashnagh) is a village in Gerdeh Rural District of the Central District in Namin County, Ardabil province, Iran.

== Demographics ==
=== Population ===
At the time of the 2006 National Census, the village's population was 371 in 96 households. The following census in 2011 counted 375 people in 128 households. The 2016 census measured the population of the village as 293 people in 101 households. It was the most populous village in its rural district.
