= Naneh Karan =

Village in Ardabil province, Iran

Naneh Karan Persian: ننه كران
- Village
- Location within Iran
- Coordinates: 38°22′14″N 48°31′16″E
- Country: Iran
- Province: Ardabil
- County: Namin
- District: Central
- Rural District: Vilkij-e Shomali

Population (2016)
  - Total: 935
- Time zone: UTC+3:30 (IRST)

Naneh Karan (Persian: ننه كران) (Note: also romanized as Naneh Karān, Nuna Karān, Nunakaran, Nonah Karān, and Noneh Karān; also known as Nah Neh Karān, Nanakaran, Nonah Garān, Noneh Kapān, and Nunakaran; Turkish: Nene Keran) is a village in, and the capital of, Vilkij-e Shomali Rural District in the Central District of Namin County, Ardabil province, Iran.

== Demographics ==
=== Population ===
At the time of the 2006 National Census, the village's population was 898 in 243 households. The following census in 2011 counted 930 people in 309 households. The 2016 census measured the population of the village as 935 people in 312 households. It was the most populous village in its rural district.

== Notable people ==
Former cleric and politician Fakhreddin Mousavi was born in Naneh Karan.
