= Dushan Bolaghi =

Village in Ardabil province, Iran

Dushan Bolaghi Persian: دوشان بلاغی
- Village
- Location within Iran
- Coordinates: 38°27′50″N 48°19′19″E
- Country: Iran
- Province: Ardabil
- County: Namin
- District: Central
- Rural District: Dowlatabad

Population (2016)
  - Total: 67
- Time zone: UTC+3:30 (IRST)

Dushan Bolaghi (Persian: دوشان بلاغی) (Note: Also romanized as Dūshān Bolāghī) is a village in Dowlatabad Rural District of the Central District in Namin County, Ardabil province, Iran.

== Demographics ==
=== Population ===
At the time of the 2006 National Census, the village's population was 105 in 24 households. The following census in 2011 counted 84 people in 28 households. The 2016 census measured the population of the village as 67 people in 21 households.
