= Ali Bolaghi, Ardabil =

Village in Ardabil province, Iran

Ali Bolaghi Persian: علي بلاغي
- Village
- Location within Iran
- Coordinates: 38°23′00″N 48°21′10″E
- Country: Iran
- Province: Ardabil
- County: Namin
- District: Central
- Rural District: Dowlatabad

Population (2016)
  - Total: 378
- Time zone: UTC+3:30 (IRST)

Ali Bolaghi (Persian: علی‌بلاغی) (Note: Also romanized as ‘Alī Bolāghī) is a village in Dowlatabad Rural District of the Central District in Namin County, Ardabil province, Iran.

== Demographics ==
=== Population ===
At the time of the 2006 National Census, the village's population was 372 in 90 households. The following census in 2011 counted 409 people in 113 households. The 2016 census measured the population of the village as 378 people in 114 households.
