= Gerdeh, Ardabil =

Village in Ardabil province, Iran

Gerdeh Persian: گرده
- Village
- Location within Iran
- Coordinates: 38°27′02″N 48°24′28″E
- Country: Iran
- Province: Ardabil
- County: Namin
- District: Central
- Rural District: Gerdeh

Population (2016)
  - Total: 285
- Time zone: UTC+3:30 (IRST)

Gerdeh (Persian: گرده) is a village in, and the capital of, Gerdeh Rural District in the Central District of Namin County, Ardabil province, Iran.

== Demographics ==
=== Population ===
At the time of the 2006 National Census, the village's population was 379 in 103 households. The following census in 2011 counted 492 people in 161 households. The 2016 census measured the population of the village as 285 people in 101 households.
