= Khaneqah-e Olya =

Khaneqah-e Olya or Khanqah-e Olya (Persian: خانقاه عليا) may refer to:

- Khaneqah-e Olya, Ardabil
- Khaneqah-e Olya, Kermanshah
- Khaneqah-e Olya, Markazi
