= Beris, Ardabil =

Village in Ardabil province, Iran

Beris Persian: بريس
- Village
- Location within Iran
- Coordinates: 38°14′57″N 48°36′06″E
- Country: Iran
- Province: Ardabil
- County: Namin
- District: Vilkij
- Rural District: Vilkij-e Markazi

Population (2016)
  - Total: 1,322
- Time zone: UTC+3:30 (IRST)

Beris (Persian: بريس) (Note: Also romanized as Berīs) is a village in Vilkij-e Markazi Rural District of Vilkij District in Namin County, Ardabil province, Iran.

== Demographics ==
=== Population ===
At the time of the 2006 National Census, the village's population was 1,204 in 273 households. The following census in 2011 counted 1,262 people in 320 households. The 2016 census measured the population of the village as 1,322 people in 376 households.
