= Qarah Chanaq, Ardabil =

Village in Ardabil province, Iran

Qarah Chanaq Persian: قره چناق
- Village
- Location within Iran
- Coordinates: 38°19′05″N 48°31′30″E
- Country: Iran
- Province: Ardabil
- County: Namin
- District: Vilkij
- Rural District: Vilkij-e Markazi

Population (2016)
  - Total: 351
- Time zone: UTC+3:30 (IRST)

Qarah Chanaq (Persian: قره چناق) (Note: Also romanized as Qarah Chanāq) is a village in Vilkij-e Markazi Rural District of Vilkij District in Namin County, Ardabil province, Iran.

== Demographics ==
=== Population ===
At the time of the 2006 National Census, the village's population was 366 in 87 households. The following census in 2011 counted 306 people in 89 households. The 2016 census measured the population of the village as 351 people in 102 households.
