= Beris, Iran =

Beris (Persian: بريس) may refer to:

- Beris, Ardabil
- Beris, Sistan and Baluchestan
