= Niara =

Niara is a given name. Notable people with the given name include:

- Niara Bely (c. 1790–1879), Luso-African queen and businesswoman
- Niara Scarlett, British singer-songwriter
- Niara Sudarkasa (born August 1938-2019), American scholar, educator, Africanist and anthropologist

== See also ==
- Niaraq
