= Vanand Mosque =

Mosque in Vanand, Ordubad, Azerbaijan

- Interactive map of Vanand Mosque
- Location: Vanand, Ordubad
- Area: Azerbaijan
- Built: 1324-1325

Vanand Mosque also known as the Vanand Jame Mosque, is a historical and architectural monument from the 14th century located in the village of Vanand in the Ordubad district of Azerbaijan.

The mosque was included in the list of immovable historical and cultural monuments of local importance by Decision No. 132 of the Cabinet of Azerbaijan dated August 2, 2001. Later, by Decision No. 98 of the Cabinet of Ministers of the Nakhchivan Autonomous Republic dated November 21, 2007, the Vanand Mosque was granted the status of a monument of national importance.

== About ==
The mosque is located in the village of Vanand in the Ordubad district. According to an inscription in large Naskh script at the entrance, the mosque was built in the years 1324–1325. It has a rectangular shape. The entrance is on the northern side, and the mosque is 7 meters high with an interior area of 375 square meters. A large mihrab, decorated with patterns and ornaments in various colors, is situated on the southern wall of the mosque. Inside, there is a second floor built as a balcony for women's worship. The mosque has undergone several restorations over the years. In the early 17th century, the mosque's area was expanded. The original building now forms the northwestern corner of the structure. This section can be accessed through a door on the western facade.During the expansion, a wall was built approximately 2 meters inside the mosque's western side, enclosing the wall with the inscription inside the mosque.

A second inscription in the mosque notes that it was restored in 1732 by a resident of Vanand named Mohammad Reza.This inscription is located inside the mosque, above the arch connecting the central columns on the northern side. Measuring 348 x 26.5 cm, it is written in Naskh and Shekasteh scripts with elements of Thuluth. Composed in Persian and Arabic, the inscription provides information about the economic life of Vanand and Nakhchivan in the first half of the 18th century. It was first translated into French by the Russian orientalist, historian, ethnographer, and diplomat Nikolay Khanikov.

The third inscription is written in black on plaster on the southern wall of the mosque. According to this inscription, the mosque was repaired in 1890. During this restoration, the mihrab was decorated and other painting works were carried out. The repairs were undertaken, and the inscription written, by Mirza Suleyman Marandi.

=== During Soviet Occupaiton ===
After the Soviet occupation of Azerbaijan, an official campaign against religion began in 1928. In December of that year, the Central Committee of the Communist Party of Azerbaijan transferred many mosques, churches, and synagogues to the control of cultural clubs for educational purposes. While there were 3,000 mosques in Azerbaijan in 1917, this number dropped to 1,700 in 1927, 1,369 in 1928, and only 17 by 1933. The Vanand Mosque also ceased functioning during this period.

=== After Independence ===
After Azerbaijan regained its independence, the mosque was included in the list of immovable historical and cultural monuments of local importance by Decision No. 132 of the Cabinet of Ministers of the Republic of Azerbaijan dated August 2, 2001. By Decision No. 98 of the Cabinet of Ministers of the Nakhchivan Autonomous Republic dated November 21, 2007, the Vənənd Mosque was classified as an architectural monument of national importance.

== Sources ==
=== Literature ===
- The encyclopaedia of “Nakhchivan monuments” (in Azerbaijani). Naxçıvan: national Academy of sciences of Azerbaijan nakhchivan branch. 2008. p. 521.
- Naxçıvan ensiklopediyası (in Azerbaijani). Vol. II. Naxçıvan: Elm nəşriyyatı. 2005. p. 380. ISBN 5806614689.
- Naxçıvan tarixi (in Azerbaijani). Vol. II. Naxçıvan: Əcəmi NPM. 2014. p. 528. ISBN 9789952823738.
- Nemətova, Məşədixanım (1963). Azərbaycanın epiqrafik abidələri (in Azerbaijani). Naxçıvan: Azərbaycan SSR Elmlər Akademiyası Nəşriyyatı. p. 158.
- Səfərli, Hacıfəxrəddin (2018). Naxçıvanın məscid və ziyarətgahları (in Azerbaijani). Naxçıvan: Əcəmi NPM. p. 216.
