= Minabad, Ardabil =

Village in Ardabil province, Iran

Minabad Persian: مين اباد
- Village
- Location within Iran
- Coordinates: 38°27′53″N 48°30′59″E
- Country: Iran
- Province: Ardabil
- County: Namin
- District: Anbaran
- Rural District: Minabad

Population (2016)
  - Total: 1,139
- Time zone: UTC+3:30 (IRST)

Minabad (Persian: مين اباد) (Note: Also romanized as Mīnābād; also known as Mayāvar, Menabad, Mīnāābād, Minavar, and Mīnvar) is a village in, and the capital of, Minabad Rural District in Anbaran District of Namin County, Ardabil province, Iran.

== Demographics ==
=== Population ===
At the time of the 2006 National Census, the village's population was 1,311 in 306 households. The following census in 2011 counted 1,177 people in 338 households. The 2016 census measured the population of the village as 1,139 people in 320 households. It was the most populous village in its rural district.
