= Anzab =

Anzab may refer to:

- Anzab Tunnel, tunnel in Tajikistan
- Anzab-e Olya, village in Iran
- Anzab-e Sofla, village in Iran
- ANZAB, The Australian and New Zealand Association of Bellringers
