= Dudaran, Ardabil =

Village in Ardabil province, Iran

Dudaran Persian: دودران
- Village
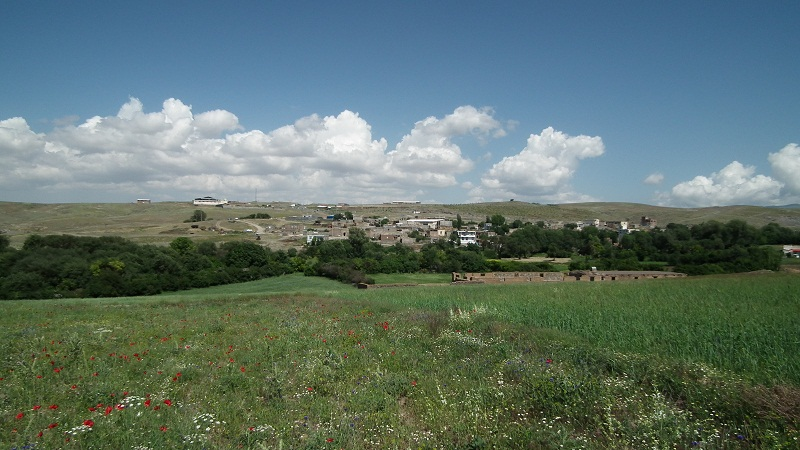
- The village of Dudaran

- Location within Iran
- Coordinates: 38°24′49″N 48°30′03″E
- Country: Iran
- Province: Ardabil
- County: Namin
- District: Central
- Rural District: Vilkij-e Shomali

Population (2016)
  - Total: 120
- Time zone: UTC+3:30 (IRST)

Dudaran (Persian: دودران( (Note: Also known as Dodaran, also romanized as Dodarān) is a village in Vilkij-e Shomali Rural District of the Central District in Namin County, Ardabil province, Iran.

== Demographics ==
=== Population ===
At the time of the 2006 National Census, the village's population was 195 in 50 households. The following census in 2011 counted 152 people in 46 households. The 2016 census measured the population of the village as 120 people in 40 households.
