= Saqqezchi, Namin =

Village in Ardabil province, Iran

Saqqezchi Persian: سقزچي
- Village
- Location within Iran
- Coordinates: 38°13′22″N 48°37′29″E
- Country: Iran
- Province: Ardabil
- County: Namin
- District: Vilkij
- Rural District: Vilkij-e Jonubi

Population (2016)
  - Total: 272
- Time zone: UTC+3:30 (IRST)

Saqqezchi (Persian: سقزچي) (Note: Also romanized as Saqqezchī) is a village in Vilkij-e Jonubi Rural District of Vilkij District in Namin County, Ardabil province, Iran.

== Demographics ==
=== Population ===
At the time of the 2006 National Census, the village's population was 563 in 140 households. The following census in 2011 counted 488 people in 142 households. The 2016 census measured the population of the village as 272 people in 83 households.
