= Qarah Chanaq =

Qarah Chanaq or Qareh Chenaq (Persian: قره چناق) may refer to:

- Qarah Chanaq, Ardabil
- Qareh Chenaq, East Azerbaijan
