= Anzab-e Sofla =

Village in Ardabil province, Iran

Anzab-e Sofla Persian: انزاب سفلی
- Village
- Location within Iran
- Coordinates: 38°21′43″N 48°20′06″E
- Country: Iran
- Province: Ardabil
- County: Namin
- District: Central
- Rural District: Dowlatabad

Population (2016)
  - Total: 738
- Time zone: UTC+3:30 (IRST)

Anzab-e Sofla (Persian: انزاب سفلی) (Note: Also romanized as Anzāb-e Soflá; also known as Anzāb-e Pā’īn and Pā’īn Anzāb) is a village in Dowlatabad Rural District of the Central District in Namin County, Ardabil province, Iran.

== Demographics ==
=== Population ===
At the time of the 2006 National Census, the village's population was 704 in 168 households. The following census in 2011 counted 775 people in 208 households. The 2016 census measured the population of the village as 738 people in 201 households.
