= Niyaraq =

Village in Ardabil province, Iran

Niyaraq Persian: نيارق
- Village
- Location within Iran
- Coordinates: 38°16′04″N 48°37′55″E
- Country: Iran
- Province: Ardabil
- County: Namin
- District: Vilkij
- Rural District: Vilkij-e Markazi

Population (2016)
  - Total: 1,873
- Time zone: UTC+3:30 (IRST)

Niyaraq (Persian: نيارق) (Note: Also romanized as Niaraq; Azerbaijani: Niyara, also romanized as Niara) is a village in Vilkij-e Markazi Rural District of Vilkij District in Namin County, Ardabil province, Iran.

== Demographics ==
=== Language ===
As with the majority of people in Ardabil province of Iranian Azerbaijan, the people of Niyaraq are native speakers of Azerbaijani.

=== Population ===
At the time of the 2006 National Census, the village's population was 1,939 in 420 households. The following census in 2011 counted 1,885 people in 564 households. The 2016 census measured the population of the village as 1,873 people in 612 households.
