= Xanəgah, Nakhchivan =

Xanəgah, Nakhchivan may refer to:

- Xanəgah, Julfa
- Xanağa, Ordubad Rayon
