= Khaneqah-e Olya, Ardabil =

Village in Ardabil province, Iran

Khaneqah-e Olya Persian: خانقاه عليا
- Village
- Location within Iran
- Coordinates: 38°25′19″N 48°32′07″E
- Country: Iran
- Province: Ardabil
- County: Namin
- District: Central
- Rural District: Vilkij-e Shomali

Population (2016)
  - Total: 130
- Time zone: UTC+3:30 (IRST)

Khaneqah-e Olya (Persian: خانقاه عليا) (Note: Also romanized as Khāneqāh-e ‘Olyā; also known as Khānqāh-e Bālā) is a village in Vilkij-e Shomali Rural District of the Central District in Namin County, Ardabil province, Iran.

== Demographics ==
=== Population ===
At the time of the 2006 National Census, the village's population was 203 in 56 households. The following census in 2011 counted 189 people in 62 households. The 2016 census measured the population of the village as 130 people in 48 households.
