= Namin, Ardabil =

City in Ardabil province, Iran

Namin Persian: نمین
- City
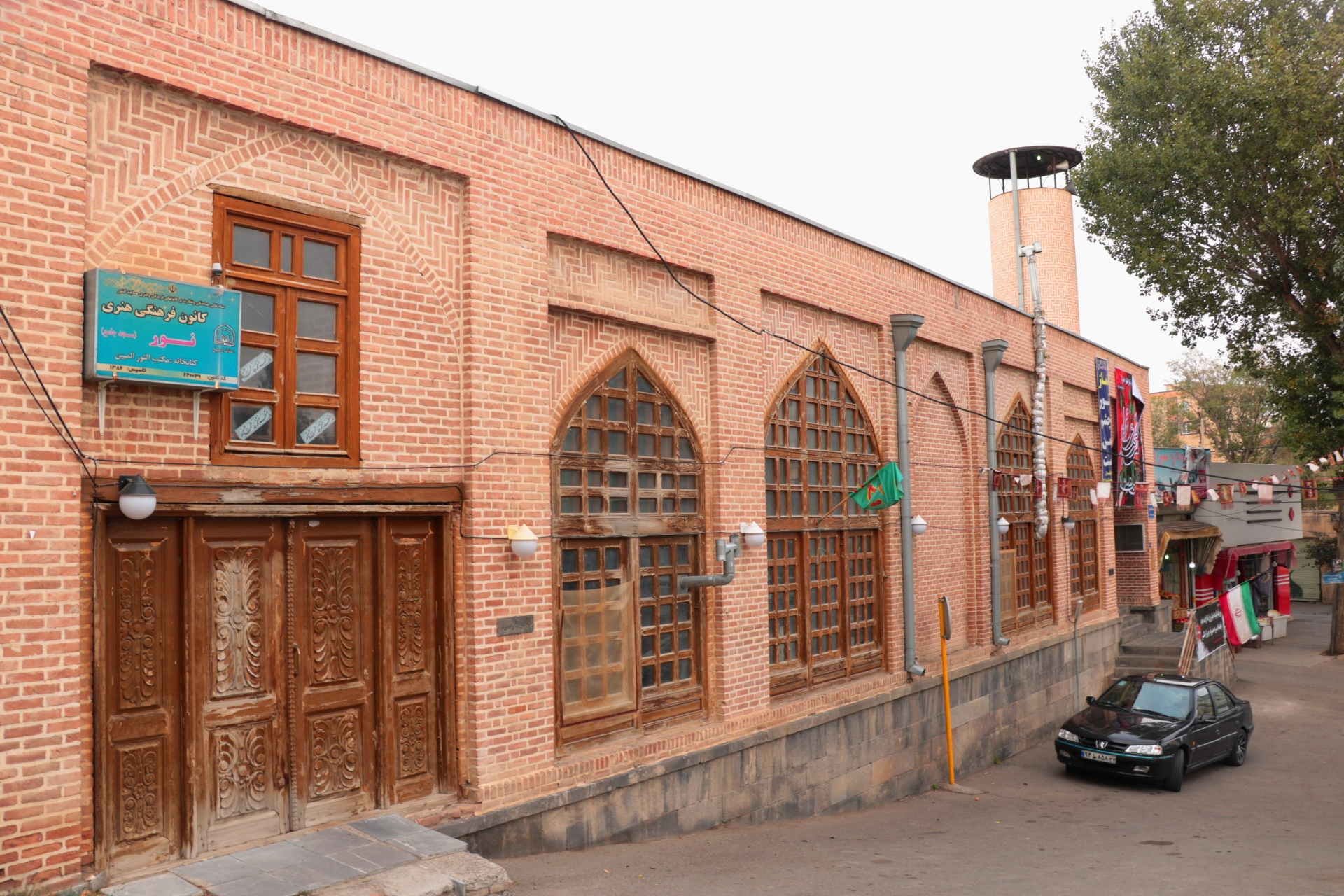
- A mosque in the city of Namin

- Location within Iran
- Coordinates: 38°25′35″N 48°28′56″E
- Country: Iran
- Province: Ardabil
- County: Namin
- District: Central

Population (2016)
  - Total: 13,659
- Time zone: UTC+3:30 (IRST)

Namin (Persian: نمین) (Note: Also romanized as Namīn) is a city in the Central District of Namin County, Ardabil province, Iran, serving as the capital of both the county and the district.

== Demographics ==
=== Population ===
At the time of the 2006 National Census, the city's population was 10,117 in 2,690 households. The following census in 2011 counted 11,963 people in 3,394 households. The 2016 census measured the population of the city as 13,659 in 4,105 households.

== See also ==
Media related to Namin at Wikimedia Commons
