= Khaneqah-e Sofla, Ardabil =

Village in Ardabil province, Iran

Khaneqah-e Sofla Persian: خانقاه سفلي
- Village
- Location within Iran
- Coordinates: 38°24′05″N 48°30′32″E
- Country: Iran
- Province: Ardabil
- County: Namin
- District: Central
- Rural District: Vilkij-e Shomali

Population (2016)
  - Total: 376
- Time zone: UTC+3:30 (IRST)

Khaneqah-e Sofla (Persian: خانقاه سفلي) (Note: Also romanized as Khāneqāh-e Soflá) is a village in Vilkij-e Shomali Rural District of the Central District in Namin County, Ardabil province, Iran.

== Demographics ==
=== Population ===
At the time of the 2006 National Census, the village's population was 475 in 130 households. The following census in 2011 counted 353 people in 112 households. The 2016 census measured the population of the village as 376 people in 134 households.
