= Anbaran =

City in Ardabil province, Iran

Anbaran Persian: عنبران
- City
- Location within Iran
- Coordinates: 38°29′19″N 48°26′03″E
- Country: Iran
- Province: Ardabil
- County: Namin
- District: Anbaran

Population (2016)
  - Total: 5,757
- Time zone: UTC+3:30 (IRST)

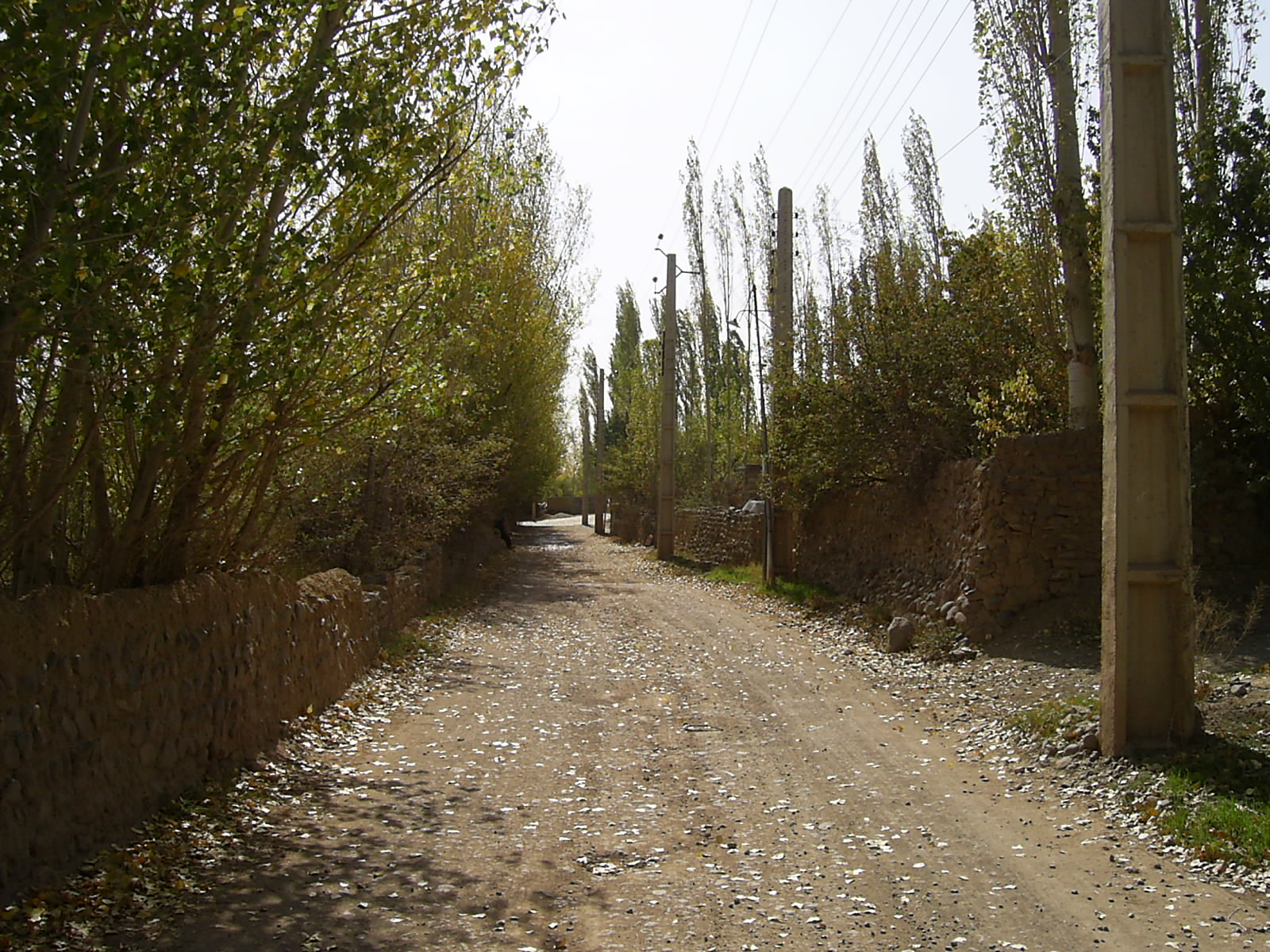

Anbaran (Persian: عنبران) (Note: Also Romanized as ‘Anbarān) is a city in, and the capital of, Anbaran District in Namin County, Ardabil province, Iran. It also serves as the administrative center for Anbaran Rural District.

== Demographics ==
=== Population ===
At the time of the 2006 National Census, the city's population was 6,161 in 1,532 households. The following census in 2011 counted 6,084 people in 1,783 households. The 2016 census measured the population of the city as 5,757 people in 1,770 households.
