= Anbaran Rural District =

Rural district in Ardabil province, Iran

Anbaran Rural District Persian: دهستان عنبران
- Rural District
- Location within Iran
- Coordinates: 38°32′N 48°26′E
- Country: Iran
- Province: Ardabil
- County: Namin
- District: Anbaran
- Established: 1987
- Capital: Anbaran

Population (2016)
  - Total: 1,196
- Time zone: UTC+3:30 (IRST)

Anbaran Rural District (Persian: دهستان عنبران) is in Anbaran District of Namin County, Ardabil province, Iran. It is administered from the city of Anbaran.

== Demographics ==
=== Population ===
At the time of the 2006 National Census, the rural district's population was 807 in 208 households. There were 766 inhabitants in 234 households at the following census of 2011. The 2016 census measured the population of the rural district as 1,196 in 392 households. The most populous of its three villages was Anbaran-e Olya, with 933 people.

=== Other villages in the rural district ===
- Qeshlaq-e Pelazir
- Qeshlaq-e Sarabad
