= Dowlatabad Rural District (Namin County) =

Rural district in Ardabil province, Iran

Dowlatabad Rural District Persian: دهستان دولت آباد
- Rural District
- Location within Iran
- Coordinates: 38°25′N 48°20′E
- Country: Iran
- Province: Ardabil
- County: Namin
- District: Central
- Established: 1987
- Capital: Dowlatabad

Population (2016)
  - Total: 5,365
- Time zone: UTC+3:30 (IRST)

Dowlatabad Rural District (Persian: دهستان دولت آباد) is in the Central District of Namin County, Ardabil province, Iran. Its capital is the village of Dowlatabad.

== Demographics ==
=== Population ===
At the time of the 2006 National Census, the rural district's population was 5,895 in 1,310 households. There were 6,199 inhabitants in 1,711 households in the following census of 2011. The 2016 census measured the population of the rural district as 5,365 in 1,500 households. The most populous of its 13 villages was Dowlatabad, with 1,587 people.

=== Other villages in the rural district ===
- Agh Zaman Kandi
- Ali Bolaghi
- Anzab-e Sofla
- Dushan Bolaghi
- Lorun
- Nowjeh Deh
- Saqsolu
- Sarband
- Tappeh
- Yajlu
- Yengejeh-ye Molla Mohammad Reza
- Yeznabad
