= Abi Beyglu =

City in Ardabil province, Iran

Abi Beyglu Persian: آبي بيگلو
- City
- Location within Iran
- Coordinates: 38°17′03″N 48°33′08″E
- Country: Iran
- Province: Ardabil
- County: Namin
- District: Vilkij

Population (2016)
  - Total: 6,516
- Time zone: UTC+3:30 (IRST)

Abi Beyglu (Persian: آبي بيگلو) (Note: Also romanized as Ābī Beiglū; also known as Āb-e Beiglū and Ābeyglū) is a city in, and the capital of, Vilkij District in Namin County, Ardabil province, Iran. It also serves as the administrative center for Vilkij-e Markazi Rural District.

== Demographics ==
=== Population ===
At the time of the 2006 National Census, the city's population was 5,242 in 1,090 households. The following census in 2011 counted 5,999 people in 1,435 households. The 2016 census measured the population of the city as 6,516 people in 1,769 households.
