= Minabad Rural District =

Rural district in Ardabil province, Iran

Minabad Rural District Persian: دهستان ميناباد
- Rural District
- Location within Iran
- Coordinates: 38°30′N 48°30′E
- Country: Iran
- Province: Ardabil
- County: Namin
- District: Anbaran
- Established: 2001
- Capital: Minabad

Population (2016)
  - Total: 2,851
- Time zone: UTC+3:30 (IRST)

Minabad Rural District (Persian: دهستان ميناباد) is in Anbaran District of Namin County, Ardabil province, Iran. Its capital is the village of Minabad.

== Demographics ==
=== Population ===
At the time of the 2006 National Census, the rural district's population was 3,625 in 874 households. There were 3,055 inhabitants in 883 households at the following census of 2011. The 2016 census measured the population of the rural district as 2,851 in 848 households. The most populous of its four villages was Minabad, with 1,139 people.

=== Other villages in the rural district ===
- Jeyd
- Kolosh
- Mirzanaq
