= Xanəgah, Jalilabad =

Xanəgah
- Municipality
- Location within Azerbaijan
- Coordinates: 39°12′06″N 48°16′33″E
- Country: Azerbaijan
- Rayon: Jalilabad

Population
  - Total: 1,320
- Time zone: UTC+4 (AZT)

Xanəgah (also, Khanagya and Khanagyakh) is a village and municipality in the Jalilabad Rayon of Azerbaijan. It has a population of 1,320.
