= Xanəgah, Khizi =

Xanəgah
- Location within Azerbaijan
- Coordinates: 40°44′33″N 49°14′16″E
- Country: Azerbaijan
- Rayon: Khizi
- Time zone: UTC+4 (AZT)
  - Summer (DST): UTC+5 (AZT)

Xanəgah (also, Khanagya) is a village in the Khizi Rayon of Azerbaijan.
