= Khaneqah, Fariman =

Khaneqah خانقاه
- Village
- Location within Iran
- Coordinates: 35°44′11″N 60°29′19″E
- Country: Iran
- Province: Razavi Khorasan
- County: Fariman
- Bakhsh: Qalandarabad
- Rural District: Sefid Sang

Population (2006)
  - Total: 26
- Time zone: UTC+3:30 (IRST)
  - Summer (DST): UTC+4:30 (IRDT)

Khaneqah (Persian: خانقاه, also Romanized as Khāneqāh) is a village in Sefid Sang Rural District, Qalandarabad District, Fariman County, Razavi Khorasan Province, Iran. At the 2006 census, its population was 26, in 6 families.
