= Gerdeh Rural District =

Rural district in Ardabil province, Iran

Gerdeh Rural District Persian: دهستان گرده
- Rural District
- Location within Iran
- Coordinates: 38°29′N 48°22′E
- Country: Iran
- Province: Ardabil
- County: Namin
- District: Central
- Established: 1987
- Capital: Gerdeh

Population (2016)
  - Total: 1,890
- Time zone: UTC+3:30 (IRST)

Gerdeh Rural District (Persian: دهستان گرده) is in the Central District of Namin County, Ardabil province, Iran. Its capital is the village of Gerdeh.

== Demographics ==
=== Population ===
At the time of the 2006 National Census, the rural district's population was 2,731 in 715 households. There were 2,755 inhabitants in 886 households at the following census of 2011. The 2016 census measured the population of the rural district as 1,890 in 632 households. The most populous of its 28 villages was Novashnaq, with 293 people.

=== Other villages in the rural district ===
- Ali Kamar
- Aqa Yarlu
- Buyaqchilu
- Fath-e Maqsud
- Gelan Daraq-e Sofla
- Gowdlar
- Hoshneh
- Khan Kandi
- Khvoshabad
- Masjed-e Mahalleh
- Nazar Ali Kandi
- Owch Bolagh
- Owranj
- Pir Javar
- Pirzadeh
- Qaleh
- Qelich Qeshlaqi
- Qeshlaq Chay
- Saleh Qeshlaqi
- Seyfabad
- Solut
- Yuzbash Mahallehsi
