= Ali Bolagh =

Ali Bolagh علي بلاغ
- Village
- Location within Iran
- Coordinates: 34°53′15″N 47°39′09″E
- Country: Iran
- Province: Kermanshah
- County: Sonqor
- Bakhsh: Central
- Rural District: Bavaleh

Population (2006)
  - Total: 114
- Time zone: UTC+3:30 (IRST)
  - Summer (DST): UTC+4:30 (IRDT)

Ali Bolagh (Persian: علي بلاغ, also Romanized as ‘Alī Bolāgh; also known as ‘Ālī Bolāghī) is a village in Bavaleh Rural District, in the Central District of Sonqor County, Kermanshah Province, Iran. At the 2006 census, its population was 114, in 21 families.
