= Khaneqah-e Vosta =

Khaneqah-e Vosta خانقاه وسطي
- Village
- Location within Iran
- Coordinates: 34°51′11″N 47°13′42″E
- Country: Iran
- Province: Kermanshah
- County: Sonqor
- Bakhsh: Kolyai
- Rural District: Kivanat

Population (2006)
  - Total: 138
- Time zone: UTC+3:30 (IRST)
  - Summer (DST): UTC+4:30 (IRDT)

Khaneqah-e Vosta (Persian: خانقاه وسطي, also Romanized as Khāneqāh-e Vostá and Khānqāh-e Vosţá; also known as Khāneqāh, Khāneqāh-e Vasaţ, Khānqāh, and Khānqāh-e Vasaţ) is a village in Kivanat Rural District, Kolyai District, Sonqor County, Kermanshah Province, Iran. At the 2006 census, its population was 138, in 33 families.
