= Do Daran, Kerman =

Do Daran دودران
- Village
- Location within Iran
- Coordinates: 29°25′50″N 57°19′56″E
- Country: Iran
- Province: Kerman
- County: Kerman
- Bakhsh: Rayen
- Rural District: Hoseynabad-e Goruh

Population (2006)
  - Total: 152
- Time zone: UTC+3:30 (IRST)
  - Summer (DST): UTC+4:30 (IRDT)

Do Daran (Persian: دودران, also Romanized as Do Darān; also known as Do Darān-e ‘Olyā) is a village in Hoseynabad-e Goruh Rural District, Rayen District, Kerman County, Kerman Province, Iran. At the 2006 census, its population was 152, in 37 families.
