= Dowdar, Hormozgan =

Dowdar دودر
- Village
- Location within Iran
- Coordinates: 26°41′50″N 57°07′45″E
- Country: Iran
- Province: Hormozgan
- County: Minab
- Bakhsh: Byaban
- Rural District: Bemani

Population (2006)
  - Total: 466
- Time zone: UTC+3:30 (IRST)
  - Summer (DST): UTC+4:30 (IRDT)

Dowdar (Persian: دودر, also Romanized as Dū Dar, Dodar, Do Dar; also known as Do Darān, Dow Darān) is a village in Bemani Rural District, Byaban District, Minab County, Hormozgan Province, Iran. At the 2006 census, its population was 466, in 85 families.
