= Xanəgah, Lerik =

Xanəgah
- Municipality
- Location within Azerbaijan
- Coordinates: 38°50′13″N 48°17′10″E
- Country: Azerbaijan
- Rayon: Lerik

Population
  - Total: 909
- Time zone: UTC+4 (AZT)
  - Summer (DST): UTC+5 (AZT)

Xanəgah (also, Khanaga and Khanagya) is a village and municipality in the Lerik Rayon of Azerbaijan. It has a population of 909.
