= Khaneqah, Khoy =

Khaneqah خانقاه
- Village
- Location within Iran
- Coordinates: 38°40′52″N 44°50′07″E
- Country: Iran
- Province: West Azerbaijan
- County: Khoy
- Bakhsh: Central
- Rural District: Dizaj

Population (2006)
  - Total: 460
- Time zone: UTC+3:30 (IRST)
  - Summer (DST): UTC+4:30 (IRDT)

Khaneqah (Persian: خانقاه, also Romanized as Khāneqāh and Khānaqāh; also known as Khanaeh, Khānagāh, Khānayeh, and Khāngāh) is a village in Dizaj Rural District, in the Central District of Khoy County, West Azerbaijan Province, Iran. At the 2006 census, its population was 460, in 93 families.
