= Vilkij-e Markazi Rural District =

Rural district in Ardabil province, Iran

Vilkij-e Markazi Rural District Persian: دهستان ويلكيج مركزئ
- Rural District
- Location within Iran
- Coordinates: 38°16′N 48°34′E
- Country: Iran
- Province: Ardabil
- County: Namin
- District: Vilkij
- Established: 1987
- Capital: Abi Beyglu

Population (2016)
  - Total: 14,513
- Time zone: UTC+3:30 (IRST)

Vilkij-e Markazi Rural District (Persian: دهستان ويلكيج مركزئ) is in Vilkij District of Namin County, Ardabil province, Iran. It is administered from the city of Abi Beyglu.

== Demographics ==
=== Population ===
At the time of the 2006 National Census, the rural district's population was 14,469 in 2,952 households. There were 14,562 inhabitants in 3,930 households at the following census of 2011. The 2016 census measured the population of the rural district as 14,513 in 4,119 households. The most populous of its 20 villages was Suha, with 1,958 people.

=== Other villages in the rural district ===
- Agh Bolagh-e Mostafa Khan
- Aladizgeh
- Arkhazlu
- Beris
- Dovarjin
- Garm Cheshmeh
- Iril
- Jablu
- Khalifehlu
- Mahmudabad
- Marani
- Mirza Rahimlu
- Niyaraq
- Qarah Chanaq
- Qarah Hasanlu
- Qarah Tappeh
- Saidabad
- Tazeh Kand-e Loqmanabad
- Yunjalu
