= Vanand, Ordubad =

Vənənd
- Municipality
- Location within Azerbaijan
- Coordinates: 38°56′30″N 45°55′35″E
- Country: Azerbaijan
- Autonomous republic: Nakhchivan
- District: Ordubad

Population (2005)
  - Total: 2,347
- Time zone: UTC+4 (AZT)

Vənənd is a village and municipality in the Ordubad District of Nakhchivan, Azerbaijan. It is located in the near of the Ordubad-Unus highway, 17 km in the north-west from the district center, on the bank of the Vanandchay river. People of the village is busy with gardening, grain growing, cotton-growing, animal husbandry. There are secondary school, music school, library, culture house, a medical center and kindergarten in the village. It has a population of 2,347. The municipality consists of the villages of Vənənd and Xanağa.

== History ==
Vanand is one of the ancient settlements of Azerbaijan. It is associated with the name of Vanandlar (people of Vanand). In the ancient cemetery were found the monuments of stone ram on the graves. In sources, in the Middle Ages it was a village in the Giran area of the Nakhchivan tumen. In the Vanand, was built the decent khanegah (place for dervishes) by Iranian political figure, historian Muhammed Juveyni (1225–83). Vanand was part of the Azadciran area of the Nakhchivan sanjag in the 18th century. In this period the village's income was the 12,783 akcha. In the Venend, the remains of the historical and architectural monuments of medieval ages, mosques, baths, etc. are kept. Poet Qudsi Vanandi was born in this village.

== Vanand Mosque ==
Vanand Mosque is a historical architectural monument of the Middle Ages in the village of the Vanand. It was built in 1324/25. The mosque area is approximately 375 square meters of rectangular form, height of 7 m, has dome. The mosque has been restored several times, in the beginning of the 17th century, a large building was added to it. At present, the original building of the Juma Mosque is north west corner of the mosque. To the enter to this part is possible from the door into the western facade. In the top of the entrance with large-scale was written in Persian by nasr calligraphy "In seven hundred and twenty-five years (1324-25) ... built". In the other epitaph indicates that the mosque was restored in 1732, by Mohammad Reza from Vanand. During the restoration, on the north side of the arch, on the epitaph provides information in Persian and Arabic, on the economic life of Vanand and Nakhchivan in the first half of the 18th century. Epitaph, for the first time was translated into French, by the Russian orientalist, historian, ethnographer and diplomat N.V. Xanıkov.
