= Ali Bolaghi, East Azerbaijan =

Ali Bolaghi علي بلاغي
- Village
- Location within Iran
- Coordinates: 38°51′24″N 46°40′55″E
- Country: Iran
- Province: East Azerbaijan
- County: Khoda Afarin
- Bakhsh: Minjavan
- Rural District: Dizmar-e Sharqi

Population (2006)
  - Total: 61
- Time zone: UTC+3:30 (IRST)
  - Summer (DST): UTC+4:30 (IRDT)

Ali Bolaghi (Persian: علي بلاغي, also Romanized as ‘Alī Bolāghī; also known as Ali-Bolag, Ali Bulagh, and ‘Ali Bulāq) is a village in Dizmar-e Sharqi Rural District, Minjavan District, Khoda Afarin County, East Azerbaijan Province, Iran. At the 2006 census, its population was 61, in 9 families.
