= Khanqah-e Alvaj =

Khanqah-e Alvaj خانقاه الواج
- Village
- Location within Iran
- Coordinates: 37°34′02″N 45°00′05″E
- Country: Iran
- Province: West Azerbaijan
- County: Urmia
- Bakhsh: Central
- Rural District: Rowzeh Chay

Population (2006)
  - Total: 1,790
- Time zone: UTC+3:30 (IRST)
  - Summer (DST): UTC+4:30 (IRDT)

Khanqah-e Alvaj (Persian: خانقاه الواج, also Romanized as Khānqāh-e Alvāj; also known as Khāneqāh and Khānqāh-e Alvāch) is a village in Rowzeh Chay Rural District, in the Central District of Urmia County, West Azerbaijan Province, Iran. At the 2006 census, its population was 1,790, in 387 families.
