= Gerdeh Layan =

Gerdeh Layan گرده لائين
- Village
- Location within Iran
- Coordinates: 37°15′59″N 47°46′43″E
- Country: Iran
- Province: East Azerbaijan
- County: Meyaneh
- Bakhsh: Central
- Rural District: Qaflankuh-e Gharbi

Population (2006)
  - Total: 66
- Time zone: UTC+3:30 (IRST)
  - Summer (DST): UTC+4:30 (IRDT)

Gerdeh Layan (Persian: گرده لائين, also Romanized as Gerdeh Lāyan) is a village in Qaflankuh-e Gharbi Rural District, in the Central District of Meyaneh County, East Azerbaijan Province, Iran. At the 2006 census, its population was 66, in 15 families.
