= Khaneqah Kandi =

Khaneqah Kandi خانقاه كندي
- Village
- Location within Iran
- Coordinates: 39°00′48″N 47°06′41″E
- Country: Iran
- Province: East Azerbaijan
- County: Kaleybar
- Bakhsh: Central
- Rural District: Mulan

Population (2006)
  - Total: 14
- Time zone: UTC+3:30 (IRST)
  - Summer (DST): UTC+4:30 (IRDT)

Khaneqah Kandi (Persian: خانقاه كندي, also Romanized as Khāneqāh Kandī; also known as Khāneqāh and Khānqā) is a village in the Mulan Rural District, located in the Central District of Kaleybar County, East Azerbaijan Province, Iran. According to the 2006 census, the village had a population of 14 people, comprising 5 families.
