= Khaneqah Juju =

Khaneqah Juju خانقاه جوجو
- Village
- Location within Iran
- Coordinates: 35°21′12″N 46°32′41″E
- Country: Iran
- Province: Kurdistan
- County: Sanandaj
- Bakhsh: Kalatrazan
- Rural District: Negel

Population (2006)
  - Total: 111
- Time zone: UTC+3:30 (IRST)
  - Summer (DST): UTC+4:30 (IRDT)

Khaneqah Juju (Persian: خانقاه جوجو, also Romanized as Khāneqāh Jūjū, Khānaqāh-e Jūju, Khāneqāh-e Jūjū; also known as Khāngeh and Khanjeh) is a village in Negel Rural District, Kalatrazan District, Sanandaj County, Kurdistan Province, Iran. At the 2006 census, its population was 111, in 23 families. The village is populated by Kurds.
