= Khaneqah-e Gelin =

Khaneqah-e Gelin خانقاه گلين
- Village
- Location within Iran
- Coordinates: 35°08′46″N 46°50′14″E
- Country: Iran
- Province: Kurdistan
- County: Sanandaj
- Bakhsh: Central
- Rural District: Zhavarud-e Sharqi

Population (2006)
  - Total: 259
- Time zone: UTC+3:30 (IRST)
  - Summer (DST): UTC+4:30 (IRDT)

Khaneqah-e Gelin (Persian: خانقاه گلين, also Romanized as Khāneqāh-e Gelīn and Khāneqāh Golīn; also known as Khāneqāh, Khāngāh, and Khāngān) is a village in Zhavarud-e Sharqi Rural District, in the Central District of Sanandaj County, Kurdistan Province, Iran. At the 2006 census, its population was 259, in 60 families. The village is populated by Kurds.
