= Khaneqah-e Hasan Gavgir =

Khaneqah-e Hasan Gavgir خانقاه حسن گاوگير
- Village
- Location within Iran
- Coordinates: 35°21′18″N 46°38′43″E
- Country: Iran
- Province: Kurdistan
- County: Sanandaj
- Bakhsh: Kalatrazan
- Rural District: Kalatrazan

Population (2006)
  - Total: 43
- Time zone: UTC+3:30 (IRST)
  - Summer (DST): UTC+4:30 (IRDT)

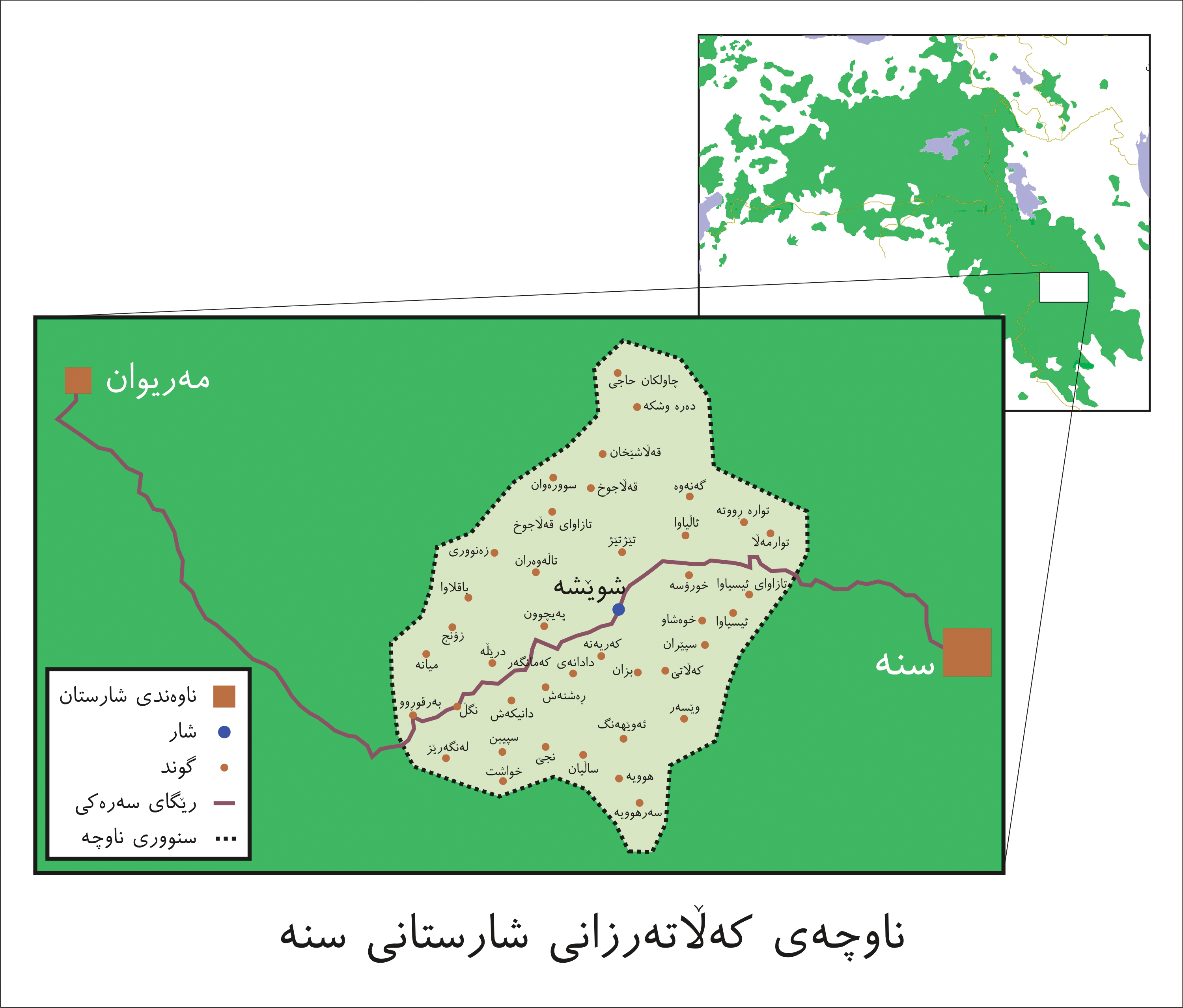
map of Kalatarzan

Khaneqah-e Hasan Gavgir (Persian: خانقاه حسن گاوگير, also Romanized as Khāneqāh-e Ḩasan Gāvgīr; also known as Khāneqāh-e Ḩasan Jādār) is a village in Kalatrazan Rural District, Kalatrazan District, Sanandaj County, Kurdistan Province, Iran. At the 2006 census, its population was 43, in 11 families. The village is populated by Kurds.
