= Vilkij-e Jonubi Rural District =

Rural district in Ardabil province, Iran

Vilkij-e Jonubi Rural District Persian: دهستان ويلكيج جنوبي
- Rural District
- Location within Iran
- Coordinates: 38°13′N 48°39′E
- Country: Iran
- Province: Ardabil
- County: Namin
- District: Vilkij
- Established: 1987
- Capital: Hur

Population (2016)
  - Total: 3,916
- Time zone: UTC+3:30 (IRST)

Vilkij-e Jonubi Rural District (Persian: دهستان ويلكيج جنوبي) is in Vilkij District of Namin County, Ardabil province, Iran. Its capital is the village of Hur.

== Demographics ==
=== Population ===
At the time of the 2006 National Census, the rural district's population was 4,229 in 888 households. There were 4,399 inhabitants in 1,218 households at the following census of 2011. The 2016 census measured the population of the rural district as 3,916 in 1,143 households. The most populous of its five villages was Hur, with 3,248 people.

=== Other villages in the rural district ===
- Raz
- Saqqezchi
- Tighiyeh
