= Vilkij-e Shomali Rural District =

Rural district in Ardabil province, Iran

Vilkij-e Shomali Rural District Persian: دهستان ويلكيج شمالي
- Rural District
- Location within Iran
- Coordinates: 38°22′N 48°31′E
- Country: Iran
- Province: Ardabil
- County: Namin
- District: Central
- Established: 1987
- Capital: Naneh Karan

Population (2016)
  - Total: 4,996
- Time zone: UTC+3:30 (IRST)

Vilkij-e Shomali Rural District (Persian: دهستان ويلكيج شمالي) is in the Central District of Namin County, Ardabil province, Iran. Its capital is the village of Naneh Karan.

== Demographics ==
=== Population ===
At the time of the 2006 National Census, the rural district's population was 5,966 in 1,423 households. There were 5,551 inhabitants in 1,630 households at the following census of 2011. The 2016 census measured the population of the rural district as 4,996 in 1,558 households. The most populous of its 21 villages was Naneh Karan, with 935 people.

=== Other villages in the rural district ===
- Arpa Tappehsi
- Dagermandaraq
- Dudaran
- Gollu
- Jegar Kandi
- Kenazaq
- Khaneqah-e Olya
- Khaneqah-e Sofla
- Khashheyran
- Kolleh Sar
- Mehdi Posti
- Now Deh
- Owlaghan
- Pateh Khvor
- Sula
- Suli Daraq
- Yengejeh
