= Khaneqah Kolahi =

Khaneqah Kolahi خانقاه كلاهي
- Village
- Country: Iran
- Province: East Azerbaijan
- County: Kaleybar
- Bakhsh: Central
- Rural District: Mulan

Population (2006)
  - Total: 37
- Time zone: UTC+3:30 (IRST)
  - Summer (DST): UTC+4:30 (IRDT)

Khaneqah Kolahi (Persian: خانقاه كلاهي, also Romanized as Khāneqāh Kolāhī) is a village in Mulan Rural District, in the Central District of Kaleybar County, East Azerbaijan Province, Iran. At the 2006 census, its population was 37, in 7 families.
