= Khaneqah-e Sheykh =

Khaneqah-e Sheykh خانقاه شيخ
- Village
- Location within Iran
- Coordinates: 36°13′28″N 46°28′35″E
- Country: Iran
- Province: Kurdistan
- County: Saqqez
- Bakhsh: Ziviyeh
- Rural District: Saheb

Population (2006)
  - Total: 93
- Time zone: UTC+3:30 (IRST)
  - Summer (DST): UTC+4:30 (IRDT)

Khaneqah-e Sheykh (Persian: خانقاه شيخ, also Romanized as Khāneqāh-e Sheykh; also known as Khāneqāh) is a village in Saheb Rural District, Ziviyeh District, Saqqez County, Kurdistan Province, Iran. At the 2006 census, its population was 93, in 18 families. The village is populated by Kurds.
