= Khaneqah-e Razab =

Khaneqah-e Razab خانقاه رزاب
- Village
- Location within Iran
- Coordinates: 35°16′10″N 46°23′51″E
- Country: Iran
- Province: Kurdistan
- County: Sarvabad
- Bakhsh: Central
- Rural District: Razab

Population (2006)
  - Total: 123
- Time zone: UTC+3:30 (IRST)
  - Summer (DST): UTC+4:30 (IRDT)

Khaneqah-e Razab (Persian: خانقاه رزاب, also Romanized as Khāneqāh-e Razāb; also known as Khānāgah, Khān Āgāh, Khānaqāh, Khān Āqāh, Khāneqāh, and Khāneqāh-e Zar Āb) is a village in Razab Rural District, in the Central District of Sarvabad County, Kurdistan Province, Iran. At the 2006 census, its population was 123, in 28 families. The village is populated by Kurds.
