= Khaneqah-e Sofla, Kermanshah =

Khaneqah-e Sofla خانقاه سفلي
- Village
- Location within Iran
- Coordinates: 34°52′02″N 47°13′53″E
- Country: Iran
- Province: Kermanshah
- County: Sonqor
- Bakhsh: Kolyai
- Rural District: Kivanat

Population (2006)
  - Total: 147
- Time zone: UTC+3:30 (IRST)
  - Summer (DST): UTC+4:30 (IRDT)

Khaneqah-e Sofla (Persian: خانقاه سفلي, also Romanized as Khānqāh-e Soflá) is a village in Kivanat Rural District, Kolyai District, Sonqor County, Kermanshah Province, Iran. At the 2006 census, its population was 147, in 36 families.
