= Khaneqah-e Olya, Kermanshah =

Khaneqah-e Olya خانقاه عليا
- Village
- Location within Iran
- Coordinates: 34°49′26″N 47°14′05″E
- Country: Iran
- Province: Kermanshah
- County: Sonqor
- Bakhsh: Kolyai
- Rural District: Kivanat

Population (2006)
  - Total: 137
- Time zone: UTC+3:30 (IRST)
  - Summer (DST): UTC+4:30 (IRDT)

Khaneqah-e Olya (Persian: خانقاه عليا, also Romanized as Khāneqāh-e ‘Olyā) is a village in Kivanat Rural District, Kolyai District, Sonqor County, Kermanshah Province, Iran. At the 2006 census, its population was 137, in 29 families.
