= Khanegah, West Azerbaijan =

Khanegah خانگه
- Village
- Location within Iran
- Coordinates: 36°35′28″N 45°33′56″E
- Country: Iran
- Province: West Azerbaijan
- County: Mahabad
- Bakhsh: Khalifan
- Rural District: Mangur-e Sharqi

Population (2006)
  - Total: 82
- Time zone: UTC+3:30 (IRST)
  - Summer (DST): UTC+4:30 (IRDT)

Khanegah (Persian: خانگه, also Romanized as Khānegah; also known as Khāneqāh) is a village in Mangur-e Sharqi Rural District, Khalifan District, Mahabad County, West Azerbaijan Province, Iran. At the 2006 census, its population was 82, in 15 families.
