= Khaneqah-e Sofla, East Azerbaijan =

Khaneqah-e Sofla خانقاه سفلي
- Village
- Location within Iran
- Coordinates: 39°06′45″N 47°09′19″E
- Country: Iran
- Province: East Azerbaijan
- County: Kaleybar
- Bakhsh: Central
- Rural District: Mulan

Population (2006)
  - Total: 77
- Time zone: UTC+3:30 (IRST)
  - Summer (DST): UTC+4:30 (IRDT)

Khaneqah-e Sofla (Persian: خانقاه سفلي, also Romanized as Khāneqāh-e Soflá; also known as Khāneqāh Ojāq and Khāngāh Ojāq) is a village in Mulan Rural District, in the Central District of Kaleybar County, East Azerbaijan Province, Iran. At the 2006 census, its population was 77, in 12 families.
