= Xanağa =

- Location within Azerbaijan
- Coordinates: 38°55′N 45°56′E
- Country: Azerbaijan
- Autonomous republic: Nakhchivan
- District: Ordubad
- Municipality: Vənənd

Population (2005)
  - Total: 665
- Time zone: UTC+4 (AZT)

Xanağa (also Khanagha, known as Çapayevka until 2000) is a municipality and village in the Ordubad District of Nakhchivan, Azerbaijan. It is located near the Ordubad-Vanand highway, 14 km in the north-west from the district center, on the left bank of the Araz River. Its population is busy with gardening, farming and animal husbandry. There are secondary school, club, library and a medical center in the village. It has a population of 665. It forms part of the municipality of Vənənd.

== Etymology ==
The name of the village is most likely related with the sanctuary (Khaneghah) in its territory. Generally, Khanegahs is in the meaning of "place of dervishes", were built on the sacred places.

== Khanagha Piri ==
Khanagha Piri - Sanctuary in the Khanagha village of Ordubad region. It consists of the building of two-rooms on the north side of the village. There is a grave in the center of the big room which is covered with the black coating. Over of the grave built with stones in height of about 20 sm. At the right and left side of the window on the south wall of the sanctuary, about 1 m height in the two alcoves was laid the gravestones from the greenish stone. At the right side, in the inscription in Arabic of the gravestone (70х40 sm) was engraved the Quran verse, deceased's name and date of death: "This is the grave of the late Syed Tahir son of the Syed Ali. At the date of seven hundred and seven" (in 1308). At the left side, on the gravestone (59х37 sm) on the 7-line inscription in Arabic was indicated that this is the grave of Sheikh Islam son of the Sheikh Nureddin. From the gravestones it becomes clear that the grave which built and plastered in fact at the past it has consisted from the two graves. Russian scientist V. M. Sısoyev (in 1926) has confirmed the information about existence of the two graves in 20 cm away from each other, in the size of 3,25х1,25 m in large room of the sanctuary. It allows to be supposed that in the past, there was Khaneghah (place for dervishes) which belonged to one of the Sufi sects in place of this sanctuary.
