= Anbaran District =

District in Ardabil province, Iran

Anbaran District Persian: بخش عنبران
- District
- Location within Iran
- Coordinates: 38°32′N 48°28′E
- Country: Iran
- Province: Ardabil
- County: Namin
- Established: 2001
- Capital: Anbaran

Population (2016)
  - Total: 9,804
- Time zone: UTC+3:30 (IRST)

Anbaran District (Persian: بخش عنبران) is in Namin County, Ardabil province, Iran. Its capital is the city of Anbaran.

== Demographics ==
=== Population ===
At the time of the 2006 National Census, the district's population was 10,593 in 2,614 households. The following census in 2011 counted 9,905 people in 2,900 households. The 2016 census measured the population of the district as 9,804 inhabitants living in 3,010 households.

=== Administrative divisions ===
Anbaran District Population
Administrative Divisions	2006	2011	2016
Anbaran RD	807	766	1,196
Minabad RD	3,625	3,055	2,851
Anbaran (city)	6,161	6,084	5,757
Total	10,593	9,905	9,804
RD = Rural District
