= Vilkij District =

District in Ardabil province, Iran

Vilkij District Persian: بخش ویلکیج
- District
- Location within Iran
- Coordinates: 38°14′N 48°34′E
- Country: Iran
- Province: Ardabil
- County: Namin
- Established: 1996
- Capital: Abi Beyglu

Population (2016)
  - Total: 24,945
- Time zone: UTC+3:30 (IRST)

Vilkij District (Persian: بخش ویلکیج) is in Namin County, Ardabil province, Iran. Its capital is the city of Abi Beyglu.

== Demographics ==
=== Population ===
At the time of the 2006 National Census, the district's population was 23,940 in 4,930 households. The following census in 2011 counted 24,960 people in 6,583 households. The 2016 census measured the population of the district as 25,945 inhabitants living in 7,031 households.

=== Administrative divisions ===
Vilkij District Population
Administrative Divisions	2006	2011	2016
Vilkij-e Jonubi RD	4,229	4,399	3,916
Vilkij-e Markazi RD	14,469	14,562	14,513
Abi Beyglu (city)	5,242	5,999	6,516
Total	23,940	24,960	24,945
RD = Rural District
