= Central District (Namin County) =

District in Ardabil province, Iran

Central District (Namin County) Persian: بخش مرکزی شهرستان نمین
- District
- Location within Iran
- Coordinates: 38°26′N 48°27′E
- Country: Iran
- Province: Ardabil
- County: Namin
- Established: 1996
- Capital: Namin

Population (2016)
  - Total: 25,910
- Time zone: UTC+3:30 (IRST)

The Central District of Namin County (Persian: بخش مرکزی شهرستان نمین) is in Ardabil province, Iran. Its capital is the city of Namin.

== Demographics ==
=== Population ===
At the time of the 2006 National Census, the district's population was 24,709 in 6,138 households. The following census in 2011 counted 26,468 people in 7,621 households. The 2016 census measured the population of the district as 25,910 inhabitants living in 7,795 households.

=== Administrative divisions ===
Central District (Namin County) Population
Administrative Divisions	2006	2011	2016
Dowlatabad RD	5,895	6,199	5,365
Gerdeh RD	2,731	2,755	1,890
Vilkij-e Shomali RD	5,966	5,551	4,996
Namin (city)	10,117	11,963	13,659
Total	24,709	26,468	25,910
RD = Rural District
