= Namin County =

County in Ardabil province, Iran

Namin County Persian: شهرستان نمین
- County
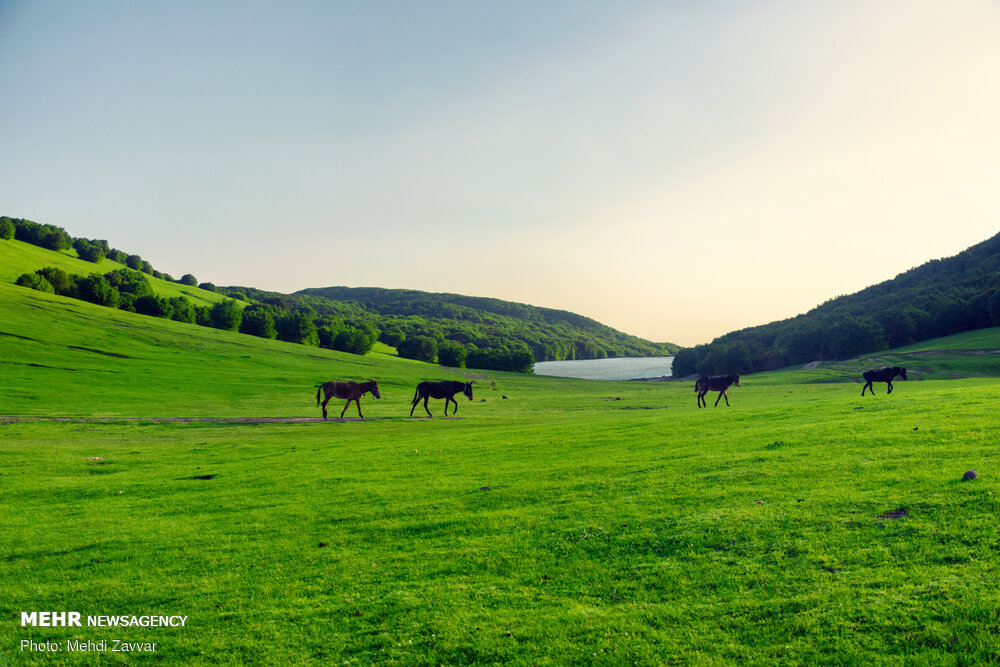
- A lake 35km from the city of Ardabil

- Location of Namin County in Ardabil province (center right, pink)

- Location of Ardabil province in Iran
- Coordinates: 38°24′N 48°29′E
- Country: Iran
- Province: Ardabil
- Established: 1996
- Capital: Namin
- Districts: Central, Anbaran, Vilkij

Population (2016)
  - Total: 60,659
- Time zone: UTC+3:30 (IRST)

Namin County (Persian: شهرستان نمین) is in Ardabil province, Iran. Its capital is the city of Namin.

== Demographics ==
=== Population ===
At the time of the 2006 National Census, the county's population was 59,242 in 13,682 households. The following census in 2011 counted 61,333 people in 17,085 households. The 2016 census measured the population of the county as 60,659 in 17,836 households.

=== Administrative divisions ===
Namin County's population history and administrative structure over three consecutive censuses are shown in the following table.

Namin County Population
Administrative Divisions	2006	2011	2016
Central District	24,709	26,468	25,910
Dowlatabad RD	5,895	6,199	5,365
Gerdeh RD	2,731	2,755	1,890
Vilkij-e Shomali RD	5,966	5,551	4,996
Namin (city)	10,117	11,963	13,659
Anbaran District	10,593	9,905	9,804
Anbaran RD	807	766	1,196
Minabad RD	3,625	3,055	2,851
Anbaran (city)	6,161	6,084	5,757
Vilkij District	23,940	24,960	24,945
Vilkij-e Jonubi RD	4,229	4,399	3,916
Vilkij-e Markazi RD	14,469	14,562	14,513
Abi Beyglu (city)	5,242	5,999	6,516
Total	59,242	61,333	60,659
RD = Rural District

== See also ==
Media related to Namin County at Wikimedia Commons
