= Vashi (disambiguation) =

Vashi may refer to:

== Places in India ==
- Vashi, subunit of Navi Mumbai township, Mumbai (Bombay), Maharashtra
- Vashi, Raigad, village in Pen Taluka, Raigad District, Maharashtra
- Vashi, Sangli, village in Walwa Taluka, Sangli District, Maharashtra

== People ==
- Vashi Dominguez, Spanish businessman
- Ami Vashi, Indian beauty queen and model, Miss India World 2003
- Victor Vashi (1911-1985), Hungarian political cartoonist

== See also ==
- Vashi Bridge, a bridge in Mumbai (Bombay), Maharashtra
- Vashi railway station, a station in Mumbai (Bombay), Maharashtra
- Vashind, census town in Thane District, Maharashtra
- Tangeh Savashi (Tangeh Vashi), gorge in the Alborz range, Iran
- Vaashi, a 1983 Indian film
- Vaashi (2022 film), an Indian film
- Washi (disambiguation)
- Vasi (disambiguation)
