= Indians in Switzerland =

Immigrants from India to Switzerland

Swiss Indians
Total population
- 27,000

Religion
- Hinduism, Sikhism, Islam, Jainism, Buddhism, Zoroastrianism, Christianity, Baháʼí, Judaism

Indians in Switzerland are the people who migrated from India to Switzerland. According to the Indian Embassy, The Indian community in Switzerland numbers approximately 24,567 Indians including over 7164 persons of Indian origin, most of whom are professionals, notably the information technology sector, financial services, the pharmaceutical industry and the research and health sector. It is concentrated in Zurich, Geneva, Basel, Baden, Bern and Lausanne in that order. There are about 1000 Indian students studying in Switzerland

The influence of Indian culture can be seen all over Switzerland with a temple in each major city, popularity of Yoga and meditation, and even recognition of Ayurvedic therapies by Swiss health insurance as a complementary treatment.

== History ==
In 1471, the law was passed in Switzerland to persecute the Romani people of Indian origin. Ever since they have been subjected to the ongoing persecution in Switzerland.

== Notable people ==
- Ankita Makwana, actress
- Neel Jani, racing driver
- Leela Naidu, actress
- Tej Tadi, CEO of MindMaze
- Prakash Hinduja, billionaire
- Nik Gugger, politician
- Arvind Victor Shah, engineer
- Jack Bertoli, architect

== See also ==
- India–Switzerland relations
- Indian diaspora
- Hinduism in Switzerland
- Immigration to Switzerland
- Romani people in Switzerland
