= Huatacondo =

Town in Chile

Coordinates: 20°55′40″S 69°03′16″W

- Huatacondo
- Country: Chile
- Region: Tarapacá
- Province: Tamarugal
- Time zone: UTC-4

Huatacondo (in Quechua: wataqunchu, 'where the condor has its nest') is a Chilean town. It is located 230 km southeast of Iquique and 118 km northwest of Ollagüe, in the Tarapacá Region, Chile.

== History ==
It is located on the edge of the old Inca road system from Arica to Quillagua and in the middle of the Pampa del Tamarugal. Its inhabitants are Indo-Spanish mixture, due to the passage of the Spanish colonization in the early days.

In September 2010, it became the first Chilean community generating its electricity by means of an isolated microgrid, based on the energy contribution from a wind turbine and solar panels.

In recent days, there's been high activity of drug smuggling in the area.

== Economy ==
At the time of the saltpeter, fruits and flowers were produced. Nowadays, the town has changed, going through a modernization in its constructions and accesses, with a semi-tropical vegetation and climate. Currently, there is production of fruits and vegetables during summer period, keeping the traditional Incan terraces system.

Nearby are the petroglyphs of Tamentica, and there are areas where the tracks of prehistoric animals were recorded.
