= Hinduism in Spain =

Spanish Hindus Hindúes españoles

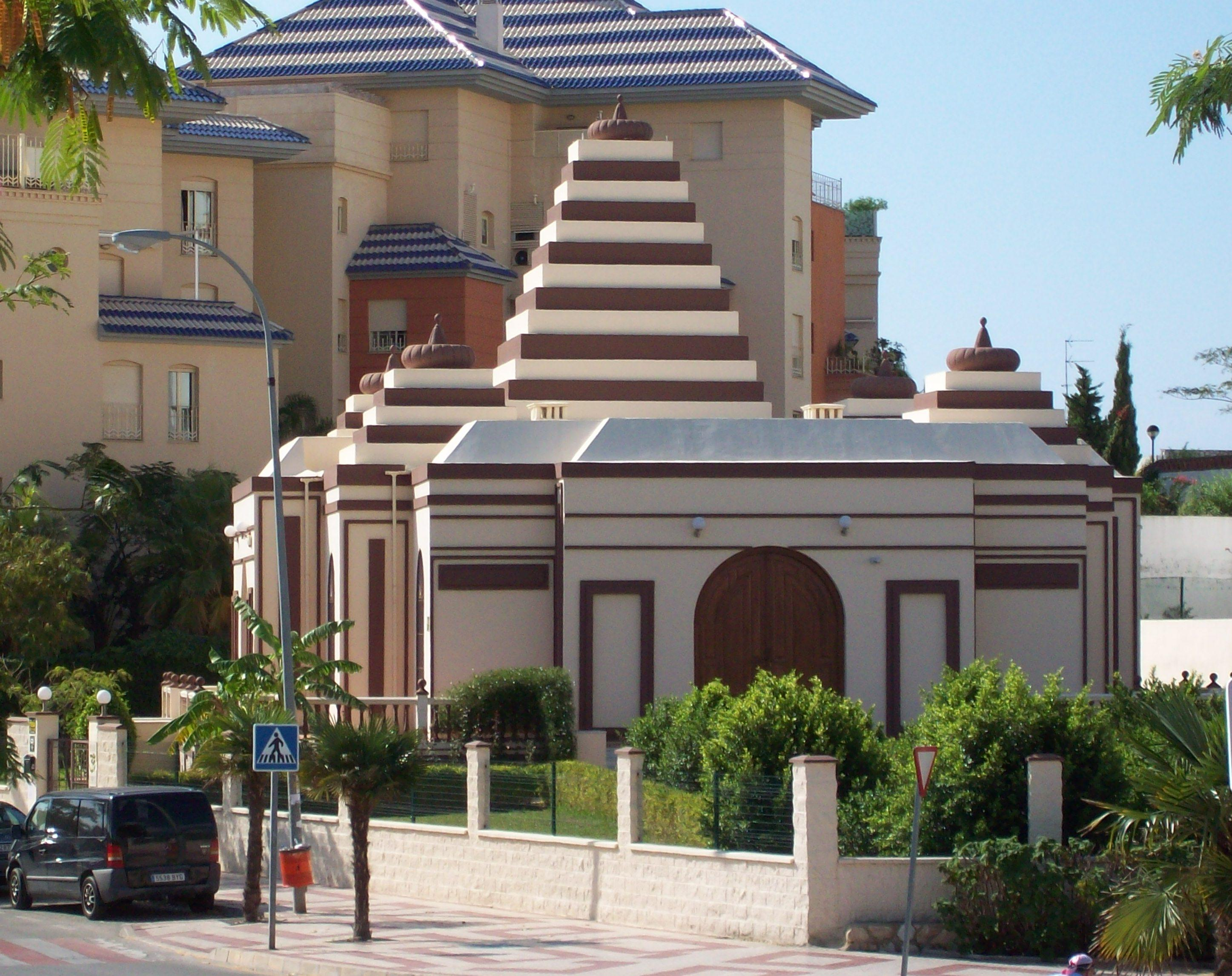
- A Hindu temple in Benalmádena, Málaga.

Total population
- 50,000

Regions with significant populations
- Catalonia, Canary Islands, Ceuta, Melilla, Valencian Community, Andalusia, Community of Madrid

Religions
- Hinduism; Majority: Vaishnavism; Minority: Shaivism

Languages
- Sanskrit, Old Tamil (sacred); Hindi, English, Tamil, Sindhi, Marathi, Bengali, Punjabi, Gujarati, Nepali, and other Indian diaspora languages, also Spanish, Catalan, Basque, Galician, Aranese and other languages of Spain

Hinduism in Spain is a minority religion, with an estimated 50,000 adherents. The Hindu population is diverse, consisting of long-established Indian diaspora communities (primarily of Sindhi descent), South Asian labor migrants, and an estimated 15,000 native Spanish practitioners. The majority of Spanish Hindus reside in Catalonia, the Canary Islands, Andalusia, Ceuta, and Melilla.

The presence of Hinduism in Spain dates back to the late 19th century, driven by trans-regional Sindhi merchant networks that established markets and trade links in Gibraltar, the Canary Islands, Ceuta, and Melilla. Following the 1947 Partition of India and geopolitical shifts in North Africa, the community grew during the mid-20th century. The earliest recorded Hindu place of worship in Europe was established by Sindhi merchants in the Canary Islands, while Ceuta and Melilla host long-standing Hindu communities deeply integrated into local interfaith culture.

Organized modern expressions of Hinduism began appearing in the 1970s through organisations such as Sivananda Yoga Centers and the International Society for Krishna Consciousness (ISKCON). Since 2015, the Hindu Federation of Spain has served as the national umbrella organisation representing the Hindu community. The organisation actively advocates for the official legal status (notorio arraigo) to secure civil rights for Hindu marriages and temples.

== History ==
=== Sindhi merchants ===
Hinduism in Spain is closely linked to trans-regional Sindhi merchant networks, originating from the Sindh region of present-day Pakistan in the early 20th century. Sindhis came to the British colony of Gibraltar for financial opportunities. Following the British annexation of Sindh in 1843, Sindhis began traveling and trading under British passports.

By the late 19th century, Sindhi merchants established trade in the Canary Islands, Gibraltar, and the North African enclaves of Ceuta and Melilla. Once Ceuta was declared as a free port in 1863 and the Suez Canal opened in 1869, the region became a strategic merchant route between Europe, Africa, and Asia. Eventually, the Sindhis crossed the Strait of Gibraltar and established business in Tangier, Tetuan, Ceuta, and Melilla. The earliest recorded Hindu place of worship in Europe was established by these Sindhi communities in the Canary Islands in the late 19th century.

The 1947 Partition of India served as a catalyst for permanent settlement of the Sindhi merchants. After the partition, Sindh officially became a part of Pakistan and the Hindu Sindhi minority was forced to flee and settle elsewhere. Thus, many Sindhi merchants settled in Spain.

In 1956, after Morocco gained independence, Sindhi families who had established businesses in Tangier and Tetuan relocated to Spanish territories. After the 1975 Green March, Sindhi merchants left former Spanish Sahara into Spain, which brought another influx of families into Spain.

=== Guru movements ===
The 1978 Constitution guaranteed religious freedom and ruled out a state religion. Organised groups drawing mainly on non-Asian followers became visible in the Spanish religious register in the 1970s. The Association for Krishna Consciousness became the first Hindu organisation entered in Spain's Register of Religious Entities in 1976. The Hindu Community of Melilla followed in 1977.

=== Migration since the 1980s ===
In the 1980s a second flow of Indian migrants arrived in Spain. This cohort compromised mostly of low skilled men from Punjab and Haryana, who found employment in low-skilled work such as food processing and contruction. Most of these migrants were Sikhs, though Hindus were also represented. From the 2000s, a smaller influx of highly skilled Indian workers arrived. López-Sala’s 2013 study described these workers as generally having little intention of settling permanently in Spain.

== Demographics ==
Approximately 50,000 individuals identify as Hindus and practice Hinduism. The Hindu population is pluralistic consisting of long-settled Indian communities (predominantly Sindhi), South Asian labor migrants, and native Spanish converts. Approximately 15,000 are native Spanish converts who affiliate with modern Hindu organisations, Vedanta centers, or yoga lineages.

=== Ceuta ===
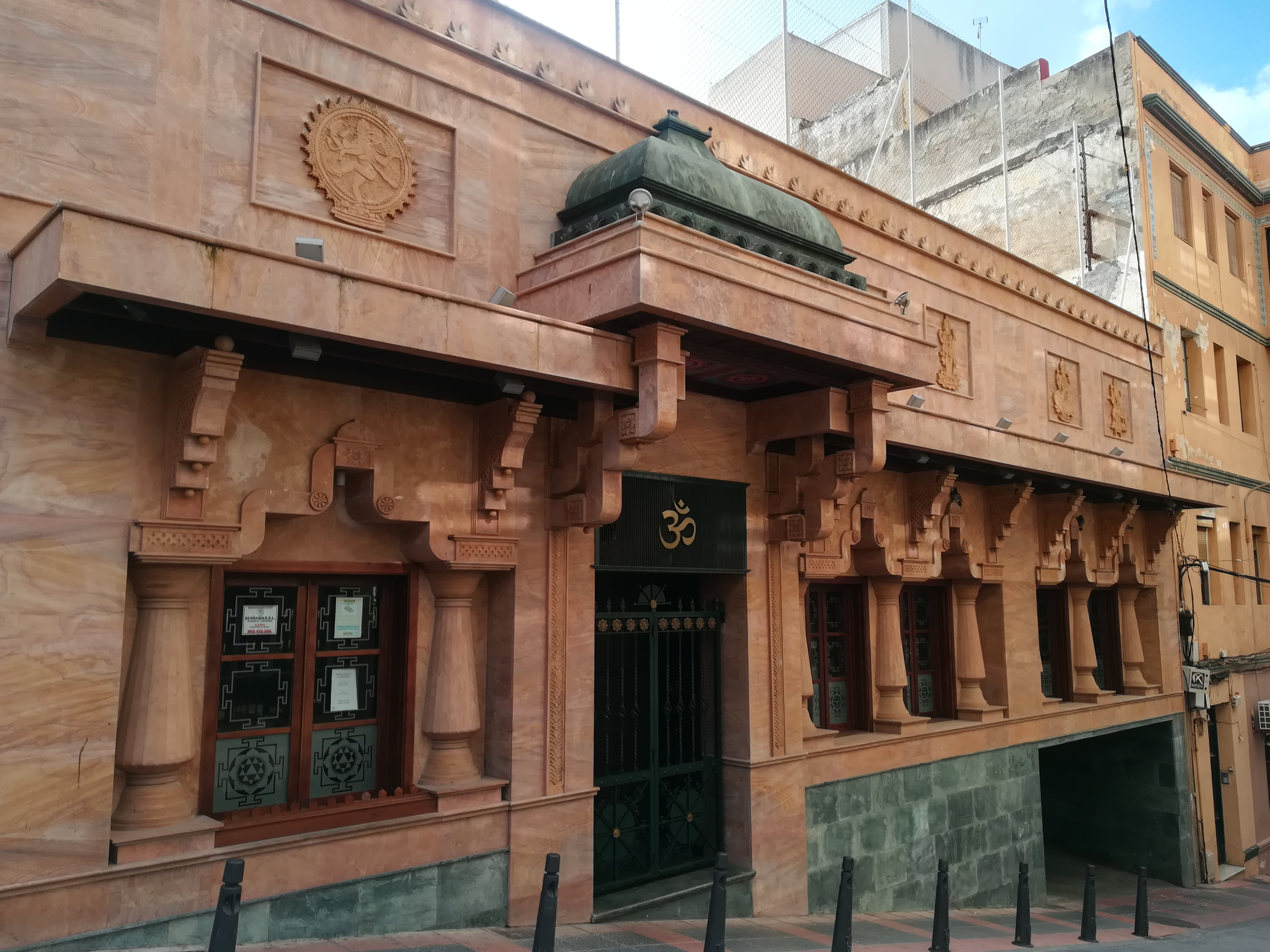
First and only Hindu temple in Ceuta, constructed in 2007

Hindus in Ceuta were first documented in the municipal census of 1900. Permission for the first Indian bazaar, "Udhavadas e hijos" was granted in 1900, and by 1917, six Indian bazaars were active. The census showed that the first Hindu merchant, Hardasmal Tolaram Mirchandani, arrived in 1909 to settle permanently and eventually his wife and eldest son in 1927. His wife was the first Indian woman resident in Ceuta.

On 3 February 1948, the community proposed the creation of the Association of Hindu Merchants of Ceuta (Asociación de Comerciantes Hindúes de Ceuta). On 28 May 1948, the association was approved by the Ministry of the Interior marking it as the first Hindu association established in Spain. In 1997, the association was updated and the name was changed to the Hindu Community of Ceuta (Comunidad Hindú de Ceuta).

On 25 September 2006, the Ceuta Hindu Crematory was officially inaugurated as the only facility that permits open-air cremations alongside modern indoor crematorium.

=== Melilla ===
A Sindhi merchant from Bombay arrived in 1893 and settled in a Muslim majority neighborhood of Mantelete. In the early 1960s, the local Hindu merchants organized an association, Comunidad Hindú de Melilla, which was officially registered on 27 June 1977. In 1978, the association rented a 150-square-meter space serving as the city's Hindu temple. Within the temple, alongside the Hindu deities are images of Jesus Christ, the Virgin of El Rocio, and the Virgin of Victoria.

==== Interfaith integration ====
Melilla Hindus actively participate in interfaith activities. The temple is part of a weekly cultural tour which includes the Hindu temple, the Shafrat Or Zoruah Synagogue, the Catholic Church of the Victoria, and Sufi Zawaiya Alawiya. The Hindu temple also participates in an annual interfaith seminar alongside Catholic, Muslim, and Jewish representatives discussing theology and concludes with a traditional meal from all four cultures.

=== Catalonia ===
There are 27 Hindu temples or centres in Catalonia as of 2014, 14 of which are situated in the province of Barcelona. The religion is mostly represented by Indian immigrants, though there is also a significant number of Catalan converts. Indeed, the vast majority of Hindu temples hold their services in Catalan or Spanish language. Hindus in Catalonia follow a variety of traditions of worship and thought, with multiple groups identifying with specific gurus.

=== Canary Islands ===
Hindus constitute 0.5% of the population of Spain overseas territory of the Canary Islands. About half of the Hindus in Spain live in the Canary Islands. Tenerife is one of the few places in Europe where Ganesh Chaturthi is publicly celebrated.

== Reception of Hinduism ==
A significant number of yoga, meditation, and Advaita Vedanta centers operate across Spain without formal religious registration. Analysis notes that although these centers consider registering with the government, organisers hesitate to publicly identify as Hindu out of fear of alienation or losing potential customers. Instead, these institutions register as cultural associations which skews the official government survey of practicing Hindus in the country.

== Hindu Federation of Spain ==
Hindu communities in Spain operated as isolated local cultural associations rather than a registered religious entity. This restricted the groups from access to the legal rights granted to recognized religious minorities.

To address this, the Federación Hindú de España (FHE; Hindu Federation of Spain) was founded in 2015. On 23 June 2016, it was officially presented in Madrid. The FHE serves as the official umbrella organisation representing Spain's theological schools of Hinduism.

=== Notorio arraigo ===
The FHE has petitioned the Ministry of Justice for the status of notorio arraigo (notable deep-rootedness). Hinduism remains without this status, despite other minority religions such as Protestantism, Islam, Judaism, Buddhism, and Jehovah's Witnesses, have obtained this status.

==== Implications ====
Without notorio arraigo status there are practical implications:

- Marriages performed according to Hindu rituals do not hold civil legal validity.
- Hindu temples and ashrams are not exempt from municipal property tax unlike Catholic churches and other places of worship for recognized minority religions.
- Hindu priests, temple architects, and musicians from India face bureaucratic hurdles when trying to attain visa.
- Hindu communities have limited access to public grants and face hurdles when seeking permits to build traditional temples.

=== Cultural advocacy ===
The FHE performs various public functions to bridge the gap between the Spanish and Hindu community. The FHE provides consultancy services to the government to correct outdated or inaccurate depictions of Hinduism in Spanish school textbooks. The FHE advocates for the philosophical roots regarding yoga and Sanatana Dharma. The FHE also promotes interfaith dialogue by representing Spain's Hindu community in national and European forums. FHE is also an active member of the Hindu Forum of Europe (HFE).

== Temples ==
The International Society for Krishna Consciousness (ISKCON) maintains a presence in Spain since 1976 operating temples in Barcelona, Brihuega, Madrid, and Churriana (Malaga).

=== Ceuta ===
The Ceuta Hindu Temple serves as the main temple, or mandir, in Ceuta and was inaugurated on 22 October 2007. The inauguration ceremony was attended by the local president, Juan Vivas, Catholic Bishop of Cádiz and Ceuta, local Imam, and local Rabbi.

The temple is designed with a neo-Vedic style with an exterior facade of Indian granite and interior made of Rajasthani-style wood and marble floor. The saffron-colored wood in the interior is a typical South Indian style. The temple houses the idols of Radha-Krishna, Shiva-Parvati, Ganesha, Durga, and Jhulelal.

Ceuta also has the images of Durga, Sai Baba, and other Hindu gurus, alongside the Virgin Fátima, Catholic cross, and a painting of a mosque in a public street-facing chapel established in the early 1900s. There is a Satnam Sakhi Mandir dedicated to Prem Prakansh Panth.

=== Melilla ===
Melilla Hindu Temple was originally founded in 1978 and reinaugurated on 4 October 2007 after completing repairs following water damage. The mandir does not have a permanent priest. Alongside traditional Hindu deities, there are images of Jesus Christ, the Virgin of El Rocio, and the Virgin of Victoria.

== Organisations ==
=== ISKCON ===
Commonly known as the Hare Krishna movement, ISKCON was established in Barcelona in 1976 as one of the first minority religions in Spain. ISKCON operates temples in Barcelona, Briheuga, Madrid, and Churriana (Malaga). They also operate vegetarian restaurants and agricultural communities. The temple in Barcelona Bhagavad Gita classes and other spiritual programs.

=== Sivananda Yoga Vedanta Center ===
The Sivananda Yoga Vedanta Center in Madrid was established in 1973 and in Barcelona in 1982. These two centers were established by a native Spanish convert Bhakti das, a disciple of Swami Chidananda, who studied at the Sivananda Ashram in Rishikesh, India.

=== The Amma Ashram ===
The Amma Ashram in Piera, Catalonia was established in 2008 and headquarters for Amritanandamayi (Amma) in Spain. The ashram coordinates Amma's annual visits to Spains drawing almost 30,000 people. This ashram also coordinates with the local Catholic charities to distribute food to families in need.

=== Siddha Yoga ===
The Siddha Yoga organisation was founded by Swami Muktananda and further propagated by Swamini Chidvilasananda, also known as Gurumayi. Since the 1980s there have been multiple Siddha Yoga centres established in Spain. The organisation worships the Hindu deity Shiva.

== See also ==
- Religion in Spain
- Indians in Spain
- Sindhis
- India–Spain relations
- International Society for Krishna Consciousness
