= Romani people in Austria =

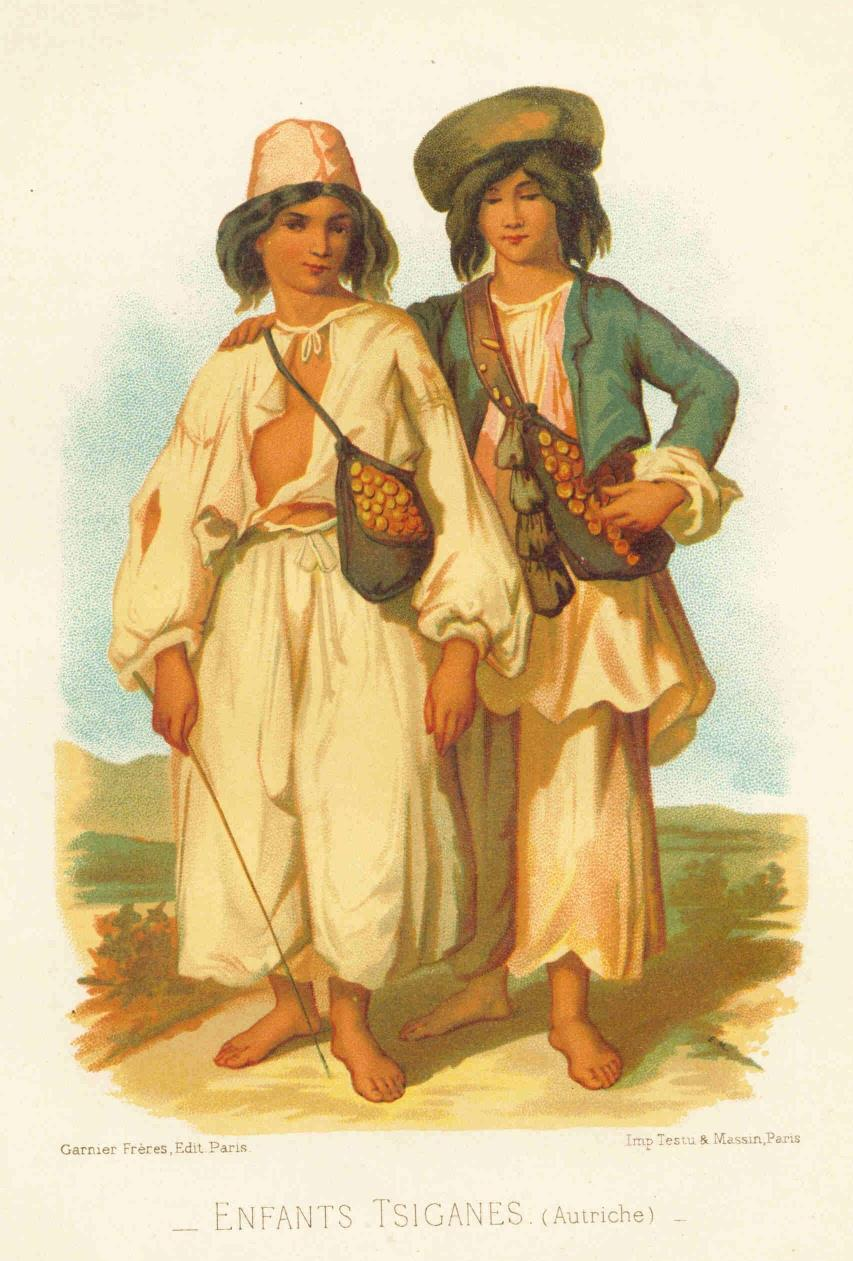
- Chromolithograph of young Roma in Austria

Total population
- c. 40,000–50,000

Languages
- Romani, Sintitikes, German

Religion
- Christianity, Romani folklore

Related ethnic groups
- Romani people in Germany, Romani people in Hungary, Romani people in Slovenia, Romani people in Switzerland

The Romani people in Austria (German: Roma in Österreich) have lived in the country since the Middle Ages. According to the 2001 census, there were 6,273 Romani speakers in Austria, or less than 0.1% of the population. Estimations count between 10,000 and 25,000. A more recent estimation count between 40,000 and 50,000 Romani people or about 0.5%. Most indigenous Romani people in Austria belong to the Burgenland-Roma group in East-Austria. The majority live in the state of Burgenland, in the city of Oberwart and in villages next to the District of Oberwart. The Burgenland-Roma speak the Vlax Romani language.

In Upper Austria there are also some Sinti families with 80% of the Sinti speaking the Sinte Romani dialect of the Romani language.

Since 1960, there has also been a significant Roma population originally from former Yugoslavian countries, especially from Serbia (Gurbeti and Kalderash Roma-Groups) and Ashkali from Kosovo and also some from Turkey.

== History ==
=== Origin ===
The Romani people originate from Northern India, presumably from the states of Rajasthan and Punjab.

The linguistic evidence has indisputably shown that roots of Romani language lie in India: the language has grammatical characteristics of Indian languages and shares a big part of the basic lexicon, for example, body parts or daily routines.

More exactly, Romani shares the basic lexicon with Hindi and Punjabi. It shares many phonetic features with Marwari, while its grammar is closest to Bengali.

Genetic findings in 2012 suggest the Romani migrated as a group. According to a genetic study in 2012, the ancestors of present scheduled tribes and scheduled caste populations of Northern India, traditionally referred to collectively as the Ḍoma, are the likely ancestral populations of modern European Roma.

In February 2016, during the International Roma Conference, the Indian Minister of External Affairs stated that the people of the Roma community were children of India. The conference ended with a recommendation to the Government of India to recognize the Roma community spread across 30 countries as a part of the Indian diaspora.

=== Romani history in Austria ===
Map of Europe showing Romani demographics

In the Habsburg monarchy under Maria Theresa (1740–1780), a series of decrees tried to force the Romanies to permanently settle, removed rights to horse and wagon ownership (1754), renamed them as "New Citizens" and forced Romani boys into military service if they had no trade (1761), forced them to register with the local authorities (1767), and prohibited marriage between Romanies (1773). Her successor Josef II prohibited the wearing of traditional Romani clothing and the use of the Romani language, punishable by flogging.

In early November 1941, approximately 5000 Austrian Romani were transported to the Łódź Ghetto. However, their stay in the ghetto was short and by January 1942 the group had been taken from Lodz to Chełmno extermination camp. There, they were all killed using mobile gas vans as part of the Romani Holocaust.

== See also ==
- Ethnic groups in Austria
