= Washi (disambiguation) =

Washi is a type of paper made in Japan.

Washi may also refer to:

- Sidiga Washi, Sudanese academic specialising in population, reproductive health and nutrition
- Washi Tahsil, a tahsil or subdistrict in Maharashtra, India
  - Washi, Osmanabad, a village
- 9063 Washi, a main-belt asteroid
- Washi Dam, a dam in Ōno, Fukui, Japan
- Washi, an informal first-person Japanese pronoun
- Washi (hill), a Welsh mountain category
- Wash (pharaoh), a predynastic pharaoh

== See also ==
- Vashi (disambiguation)
- Wasi (disambiguation)
- List of tropical storms named Washi
