= Indians in Spain =

Ethnic group

Indians in Spain Indios en España
Total population
- 73.951 (2025)

Regions with significant populations
- Madrid, Barcelona, Ceuta, Melilla, Canary Islands, Palma de Mallorca, valencia, girona, alicante

Languages
- Spanish, Hindi, Telugu, Kannada, Marathi, Malayalam, Tamil, Sindhi, Punjabi, English, Urdu

Related ethnic groups
- Non-resident Indian and Person of Indian Origin, Indian Americans, British Indians

Indians in Spain form one of the smaller populations of the Indian diaspora. According to the statistics of India's Ministry of External Affairs, they number only 35,000, or 0.07% of the population of Spain. 2009 statistics of Spain's Instituto Nacional de Estadística showed 35,686 Indian citizens in Spain; this figure does not include persons of Indian origin holding other citizenships. Most Indians originally migrated to Spain from Africa, while others came from India and Japan and Southeast Asia. According to data from 2025, there were 73.951 Indian people living in Spain.

== Migration history ==
In 1425 CE, Gitano Romani people of Indian origin were recorded living in Spain. From 1492, after Christian Reconquista of Spain and Roma along with Moors and Jews targeted to purge Spain of non-Christians. In 1499, Ferdinand and Isabella passed the law against Roma. In 1560 the habit and the costume of Roma were banned. Roma were forced to marry non-Roma, their language and rituals banned. In the 17th century, Spain deported Romas to the Americas and Africa. In 1749, Romas were arrested in the widespread persecution.

From 1580 to 1640 CE, Portuguese India (including Goa) was under Spanish control because of the Iberian Union, which caused migration of people in both directions.

After the World War II, Sindhi traders and shopkeepers thrived in the free ports of the Spanish Canary Islands of Las Palmas and Tenerife following the imposition of import and foreign exchange restrictions in Spain after the war. They conducted a brisk trade with the North African continent from Las Palmas. When Ceuta and Melilla, parts of Spanish Morocco, were also declared as free ports, Indian businessmen set up trading houses and retail shops catering to the tourist trade.

The next wave of Indians to go to Spain were descendants of Indian labourers from former Spanish colony of Equatorial Guinea. By the mid-seventies, there were over 200 Indian trading houses in Ceuta and Melilla. With the liberalisation in import policies introduced in the eighties, business activity shifted to the port cities of Malaga and Barcelona. Madrid also attracted many Indian businessmen.

== Religion ==
Sindhis and Sikhs form the majority of the Indian community. Spain has recognised three entities of Hinduism. The community celebrates various Indian festivals. Rath Yatras are also taken out by members of the Hare Rama Hare Krishna movement with the enthusiastic support of the Indian community. There are temples in Valencia, Ceuta, and Canary Islands.

== Business ==
The Indian community in Spain is integrated in the general society; the members are regarded as hard working, apolitical and peaceful.

Currently, the largest Hindu community in Spain is in the Canary Islands, especially on the island of Tenerife.

Several electronics and camera stores owned by Indians in the Canary Islands have been accused of being a fraud. In 2016 the Danish TV program "Svindlerjagt" (Eng: Swindler Hunt), went to Gran Canaria to expose several electronics stores which scammed Danish customers.

== Spanish people of Indian descent ==
- Sagar Prakash Khatnani, born in Tenerife, is a prolific writer of novels.
- Robert Masih Nahar, member of the Spanish senate
- Ma Anand Yashu, flutist
- Vashi Domínguez, entrepreneur
- Ariadna Gupta Espada, figure skater
- Raimon Panikkar, priest and advocate of interfaith dialogue
- Prakash Sunderdas, economist and member of Ciudadanos.
- Rakesh Narwani, filmmaker
- Abhir Hathi, urbano music artist from the Canary Islands.

== See also ==
- Hinduism in Spain
- India–Spain relations
- Gitanos
