= Vlax Romani people =

Wallachian Roma or Vlax Roma is the generic term for various Romani groups in Southeastern Europe who speak one of the Vlax Romani dialects. Many migrated from present-day Romania (Wallachia) to the United States in the 18th and 19th centuries to escape slavery. The Vlax Roma claim to retain Romani culture, language, and social structure despite discrimination they have faced.

In Hungary, Slovakia, and the Czech Republic (where they are known as Vlašika or Olaši), they migrated from Romania as part of the Kalderash migration wave and are subdivided into the Lovara and other groups. They are far smaller than the Hungarian Roma (known as Romungro), who mainly speak Hungarian and integrated into Hungarian society. In Serbia (where they are known as Vlaški cigani), they migrated from Romania.

== See also ==
- Romani people, mainly European descendants of the Dom
- History of the Romani people
  - Timeline of Romani history
  - Roma Route, research project in Europe
- Romani diaspora
    - List of Romani settlements
    - List of Romani people
