= Vasi, Iran =

Vasi or Wassi (Persian: وصي), in Iran, may refer to:

- Vasi-ye Olya
- Vasi-ye Sofla
