= Wasi =

Wasi or WASI may refer to:

- Al-Wāsiʿ, one of the names of God in Islam, meaning The Omnipresent
- Washi, Osmanabad, a panchayat village in Osmanabad District, Maharashtra, India
- Wasi, Sulawesi, a village in Donggala Regency on the island of Sulawesi, Indonesia
- WebAssembly System Interface

== See also ==
- Vasi (disambiguation)
- Washi (disambiguation)
