= Vasi =

Vasi or VASI may refer to:

- Visual approach slope indicator, a system of lights on the side of an airport runway threshold
- Vasi-vari or Wasi-wari language, a language spoken by the Wasi people in the Prasun Valley in Afghanistan

== Places ==
- Vasi, Iran (disambiguation)

== People with the surname ==
- Abbas Vasi, Gujarati poet
- Denise Vasi, actress and model
- Giuseppe Vasi, Italian engraver and architect

== See also ==
- Vashi (disambiguation)
- Wasi (disambiguation)
