= Romani people in Switzerland =

Romano narodo andi Schweiz (Romani)
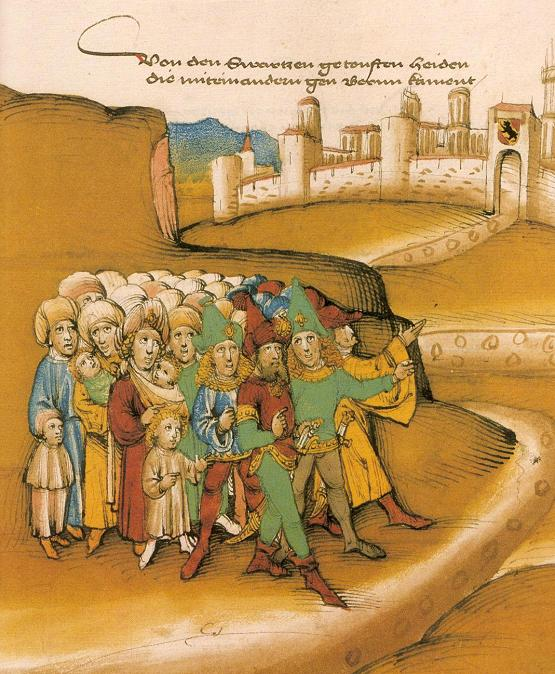

Total population
- 32,500

Languages
- Swiss German, Romani, Sintitikes

Religion
- Christianity, Romani mythology

About 80,000 to 100,000 Romani people live in Switzerland. The Romani minority in Switzerland are subjected to discrimination along with Yenish people.

There are around 400 Sinti. They are Swiss citizens and often live with Yenish people.

Between 1418 and 1422 Romani people arrived in Basel, Bern, and Zurich as pilgrims with recommendation letters. They received provisions then expelled. By 1471, Swiss Parliament formally banned Roma entirely. Execution became the penalty in 1510. A group of 300 Gypsies appeared near Geneva in 1532. Expulsion proceeded for years; an 1571 Graubünden decree mandated Roma become galley slaves. For centuries, few Romani entered Switzerland; even mid-20th century transit travelers faced border rejection. The second World Romani Congress was held in Geneva.

== History of persecution ==
In 1471, the law was passed in Switzerland to persecute the Romani people of Indian origin.

Before World War I, a police ‘Gypsy registry’ was established. In the year 1914, the Swiss Roma were interned and expelled from Switzerland. This meant that only a few Sinti and Roma families were actually living in Switzerland. The ban on Romani people entering Switzerland was rescinded in 1972.

Since 1936, the Swiss police collaborated to hunt for Romani people.

Roma, Sinti and Yenish people were persecuted in Switzerland during World War II.

== Notable people ==
- Yasmin Aga Khan
- Walter Wegmüller

== See also ==
- Timeline of Romani history
- History of the Romani people
- Roma Route, research project in Europe
- Romani diaspora
- List of Romani settlements
- List of Romani people
- Romani people in France
- Yenish people
- Sinti
- Romani diaspora
