= India–Spain relations =

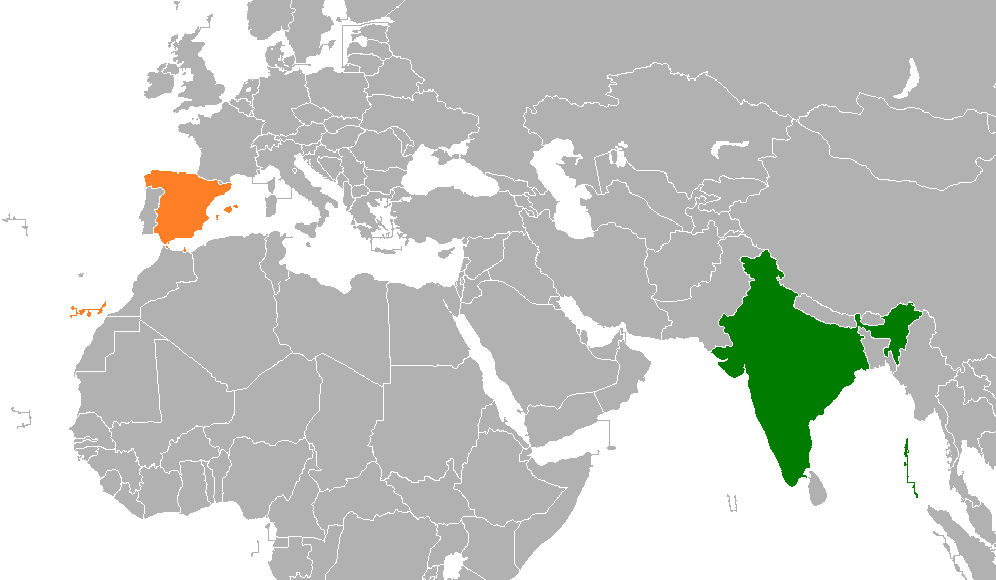
- India: Spain

Diplomatic mission
- Embassy of Spain, New Delhi: Embassy of India, Madrid

Envoy
- Ambassador Dinesh K Patnaik: Ambassador José María Ridao Domínguez

India–Spain relations or Indo–Spanish relations are the bilateral relations between the Republic of India and the Kingdom of Spain.

== History ==
=== Pre-contemporary era ===
In 1425 CE, Gitano Romani people of Indian origin were recorded living in Spain. From 1492, after Christian Reconquista of Spain and Roma along with Moors and Jews were targeted to purge Spain of non-Christians. In 1499, Ferdinand and Isabella passed the law against Roma. In 1560 the habit and the costume of Roma were banned. Roma were forced to marry non-Roma, their language and rituals banned. In the 17th century, Spain deported Romas to the Americas and Africa. In 1749, Romas were arrested in the widespread persecution.

From 1580 to 1640, Portuguese India (including Goa) was under Spanish control because of the Iberian Union.

=== Contemporary era ===
Relations between India and Spain are warm since the establishment of democracy in Spain in 1978. Diplomatic relations between India and Spain were established in 1956 with the opening of the Spanish Embassy in New Delhi. Maharaja Sawai Man Singh II, the Maharaja of Jaipur, was appointed in 1965 as the first Ambassador of India to Spain.

== Visits ==
=== Official visits by Prime Ministers ===
In 1992 Prime Minister P. V. Narasimha Rao and in 2017 Prime Minister Narendra Modi visited Spain.

== Trade ==
Relations between India and Spain have been cordial since the establishment of diplomatic relations in 1956. A Mission headed by a Cd'A opened in Madrid in 1958. The first resident Ambassador of India was appointed in 1965.

Spain is India's 7th largest trade partner in the European Union. Bilateral trade in 2017-18 stood at US$5.66 billion (Dept. of Commerce), posting a growth of 4.91% over similar period a year ago. India's exports grew 16.65% and stood at US$3.99 billion while imports shrank by 15.51% and stood at US$1.66 billion. India's top exports to Spain are textiles, organic chemicals, iron & steel, seafood, automobiles and leather. India's major imports are mechanical appliances, electrical machinery, chemicals, plastic and mineral fuels.

Spain is the 15th largest investor in India with cumulative FDI stock of US$2.76 billion (April 2000 – June 2018). There are nearly 200 Spanish companies in India mainly in the sectors of metallurgical industries, renewable energy, automotive, ceramics and infrastructure mainly in highways, transmission lines, tunnels and metro stations. Maharashtra, Tamil Nadu, Gujarat, Andhra Pradesh and Karnataka are the major destinations for Spanish investments in India. Indian investment in Spain stood at around US$900 million. There are nearly 40 Indian companies in Spain mainly in software & IT services, pharmaceuticals, chemicals and logistics. India is among the top 30 investors in Spain globally and among the top 5 from Asia.

Commerce Secretary led the Indian delegation to the 11th round of India Spain JCEC held in Madrid in January 2018. Under the framework of the JCEC, the India Spain CEOs Forum was constituted in February 2015. The first formal meeting of the CEOs Forum was held in Madrid in May 2017. Global Innovation & Technology Alliance (GITA) along with the Spanish Centre for Development of Industrial Technology (CDTI) instituted the India-Spain Programme of Cooperation on Industrial Research and Development, a bilateral framework for providing financial support to collaborative R&D ventures between Indian and Spanish industry and academia.

India and Spain have an ongoing Joint Programme of Cooperation in S&T, signed in 2009. A Science, Technology and Innovation Steering Committee Meeting was held in September 2017 in Madrid, as highlighted in the Joint Statement during the PM's visit to Spain. There are ongoing innovation driven joint R&D projects in sectors such as biosensors, bio pesticides, bio-economy, waste-to-energy, e-health and flexible electronics. During the PM visit, a MoU on cooperation in Organ transplants was also signed.

India Spain bilateral cooperation in sports has been strengthened by interaction between the sports industries in both countries and participation of leading players and teams in events in India and vice versa especially in football, badminton, hockey, and kabaddi. There is potential for having a separate MOU for cooperation in the field of sports. Recognizing the immense potential for strengthening cooperation in the field of tourism, it was agreed to set up an Expert Panel on Tourism during PM's visit. The first India-Spain Expert Panel on Tourism was held in Madrid on 21 May 2018, led by Shri Suman Billa (JS, M/Tourism) on the Indian side and Mr. Manuel Butler (DG, Turespaña) on the Spanish side.

India regularly participates in major international trade fairs and conferences in Spain viz. FITUR (Tourism), Mobile World Congress (Telecom), CPhI Worldwide (Pharmaceuticals) and Smart City Expo World Congress (Smart Cities). As agreed in the Joint Statement issued during PM's visit, the II Spain India Forum was jointly organized by CII and Spain India Council Foundation in Madrid in November 2017, in which over 200 companies participated. During 2017, the Embassy, in collaboration with its local chambers of Commerce and Industry associations, organized around 40 commercial events for trade and investment promotion and to present government's flagship initiatives. These events were focused on key sectors like infrastructure, renewals energy, food processing, automotives, defense, IT, smart cities, tourism, agri-food sector, innovation and gastronomy.

India maintains a trade surplus of $3.47 billion with Spain, with bilateral exports reaching $5.98 billion and imports totaling $2.5 billion. Major Indian exports to Spain include organic chemicals, refined petroleum, electrical equipment, apparel, and iron and steel. Spanish exports to India primarily consist of mechanical appliances, aircraft components, organic chemicals, electrical machinery, and plastics.

== Controversies ==
On 17 October 2022 the Spanish Embassy in New Delhi arbitrarily denied visas to 21 female and male Indian Wrestlers, preventing them from participating in the U-23 World Championships scheduled in Pontevedra, Spain from 17 to 23 October 2022. Denials included the U-20 Gold Medalist Antim Panghal.

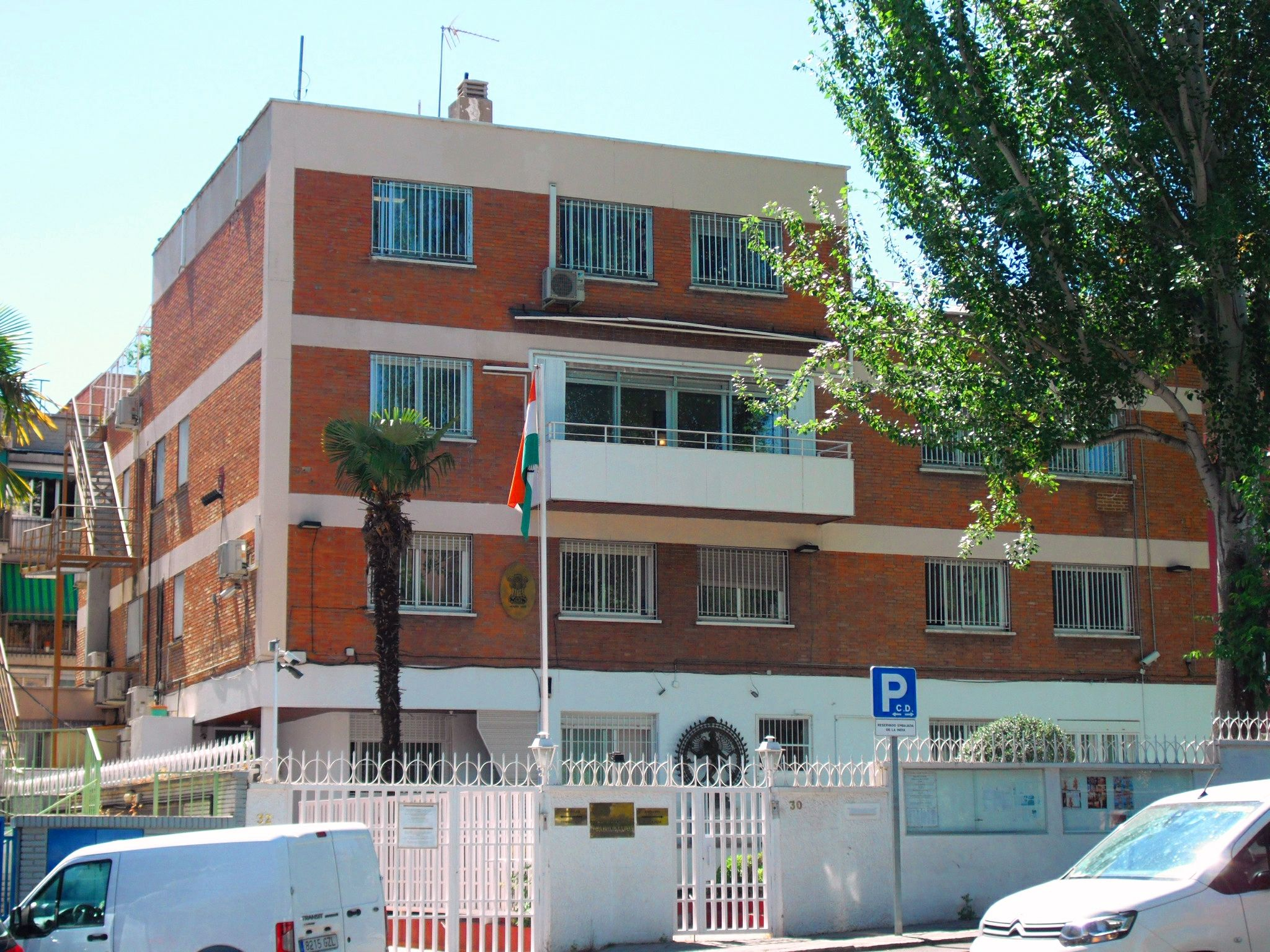
Embassy of India in Madrid

== Resident diplomatic missions ==
- India has an embassy in Madrid and a consulate-general in Barcelona.
- Spain has an embassy in New Delhi and consulates-general in Mumbai and Bengaluru.

== See also ==
- Foreign relations of India
- Foreign relations of Spain
- Indians in Spain
