= Vasi-ye Olya =

Vasi-ye Olya وصي عليا
- Village
- Location within Iran
- Coordinates: 35°06′21″N 46°49′25″E
- Country: Iran
- Province: Kurdistan
- County: Sanandaj
- Bakhsh: Central
- Rural District: Zhavarud-e Sharqi

Population (2006)
  - Total: 274
- Time zone: UTC+3:30 (IRST)
  - Summer (DST): UTC+4:30 (IRDT)

Vasi-ye Olya (Persian: وصي عليا, also Romanized as Vaşī-ye ‘Olyā; also known as Vaşī-ye Bālā) is a village in Zhavarud-e Sharqi Rural District, in the Central District of Sanandaj County, Kurdistan Province, Iran. At the 2006 census, its population was 274, in 54 families. The village is populated by Kurds.
