= Victor Vashi =

- Vashi c.1967
- Born: August 13, 1911; Pécs, Hungary
- Died: November 6, 1985 (aged 74); Vienna, Austria
- Occupations: Political cartoonist, writer
- Writing career
- Genres: Non-fiction, satire

Victor Vashi (August 13, 1911- November 6, 1985) was a Hungarian artist, animator and political cartoonist who "cartooned his way through the years of Nazi and Soviet occupation of his country." He was also considered a pioneer in Hungarian animation during the 1930s and '40s.

== Biography ==
Vashi was born Viktor Kálmán in Pécs, a large city in southern Hungary, near the border of Croatia. From 1929 to 1933, he studied at the Hungarian University of Fine Arts in Budapest. Nicknamed "Vasi", Kálmán made animated advertisements with István Balogh and István Valker during the 1930s and 1940s. By 1938, he was working for the Budapest newspaper 8 Órai Újság. He also contributed cartoons to the Pesti Posta, a satirical magazine that targeted fascists and the Nazis. The publication was banned and Kálmán was arrested by the Gestapo in 1944 and sentenced to 15 years in a Hungarian prison but was released after the end of World War II. After the war, Kálmán drew cartoons for various humor magazines which continued to target the communists. Kálmàn was arrested by the soviets and placed in solitary confinement in the Gödöllő prison camp near Budapest. He was overlooked when the prison was emptied and all able-bodied inmates were sent to Siberia. After escaping to Austria in December 1948, he began cartooning for several European magazines and newspapers. Eventually, he emigrated to the United States where he worked under the name Victor Vashi.

During the 1960s, Victor Vashi was residing at 810 A Street, S.E. in Washington, D.C., while working at McCoy Art Studio. He became chief cartoonist for the Machinist union newspaper at its headquarters on Connecticut Avenue, owned by Tom McCoy of Bethesda Maryland. Vashi was reportedly very kind and doted on the children of headquarters executives who visited, even entertaining and giving drawing tips to young talent. Vashi returned to Europe late in his life; He died in Vienna in 1985 at the age of 74.

Victor Vashi is probably best known in the United States for two published books of satirical political cartoons. The first collection, The Sing Along with Khrushchev Coloring Book was published in 1962 and written from the perspective of the granddaughter of Nikita Khrushchev, writing to her pen-pal, Caroline Kennedy, daughter of U.S. President John F. Kennedy. The book was published by the spurious "Sov-o'Press", presumably part of the joke. Vashi's next book, The Red Primer for Children and Diplomats was published by Viewpoint Books in 1967, on the occasion of the 50th anniversary of the October Revolution of 1917. The book is a humorous cartoon history of communism in the Soviet Union.

== Cartooning career ==
Red Primer Book cover

Victor's style of cartooning is similar to that of American political cartoonist Herbert Block. Although, discrete evidence of study or influence by Block cannot be determined.

=== Affiliated newspapers ===
After his escape to Austria, Victor cartooned for various European newspapers:

- Salzburger Nachrichten of Salzburg
- Wiener Kurier of Vienna
- Hungaria of Munich
- Emigrans Szabad Szaj of Paris
- Paraat of Amsterdam

His work was featured throughout his career in several other newspapers:

- Magyarsag of Pittsburgh
- Kepes Magyar Magazin of New York
- The Machinist and Machinist Journal of Washington, D.C.
- Federation of Hungarian Former Political Prisoners of New York

=== The Sing along with Khrushchev Coloring Book ===
This may be Vashi's first work in book form. It is a satirical letter from Khrushchev's granddaughter, "Nyetochka," to Caroline Kennedy. The 24 pages of text and cartoons are written from the perspective of Nyetochka and makes fun of her "grandpa" and socialist uncles, such as her favorite "Uncle Fidel," who she recommends to color "a dirty brown," or her "Uncle Nehru", who she recommends coloring a "shocking pink." A cartoon of the Berlin Wall suggests "color West Berlin green, because the grass is always greener on the other side. For East Berlin a kind of drab will do." Khrushchev appears throughout as a caricature wearing only one shoe, a reference to his famous shoe pounding spectacle at the United Nations in 1960.

The text of the book was written by Ilona Fabian with all the cartoons drawn by Vashi. The coloring book was self-published in the United States in 1962 under the Sov-o'Press imprint.

In February 1964, the coloring book was brought up at the House Un-American Activities Committee when James D. Atkinson, an associate professor of government at Georgetown University in support of a bill creating a Freedom Commission, as an example of the sort of work that such a commission would encourage.

=== Red Primer for Children and Diplomats ===
This is Victor Vashi's magnum opus, a humorous historical retrospective of the Soviet Union told in cartoons, published to commemorate the 50th anniversary of the 1917 October Revolution. Vashi's foreword states, "Those who do not read history are condemned to repeat it." The book is a mix of pen and ink sketches; a few of the drawings were previously published in various newspapers.

Red Primer was first published in the United States in a paperback edition by Viewpoint Books (now defunct) in June 1967. The book apparently sold well as original copies are often available from dealers in used books. The book can be found with either a yellow or white cover (apparently changed with an increase in the cover price). The book is now available in an online edition.
