= Tej Tadi =

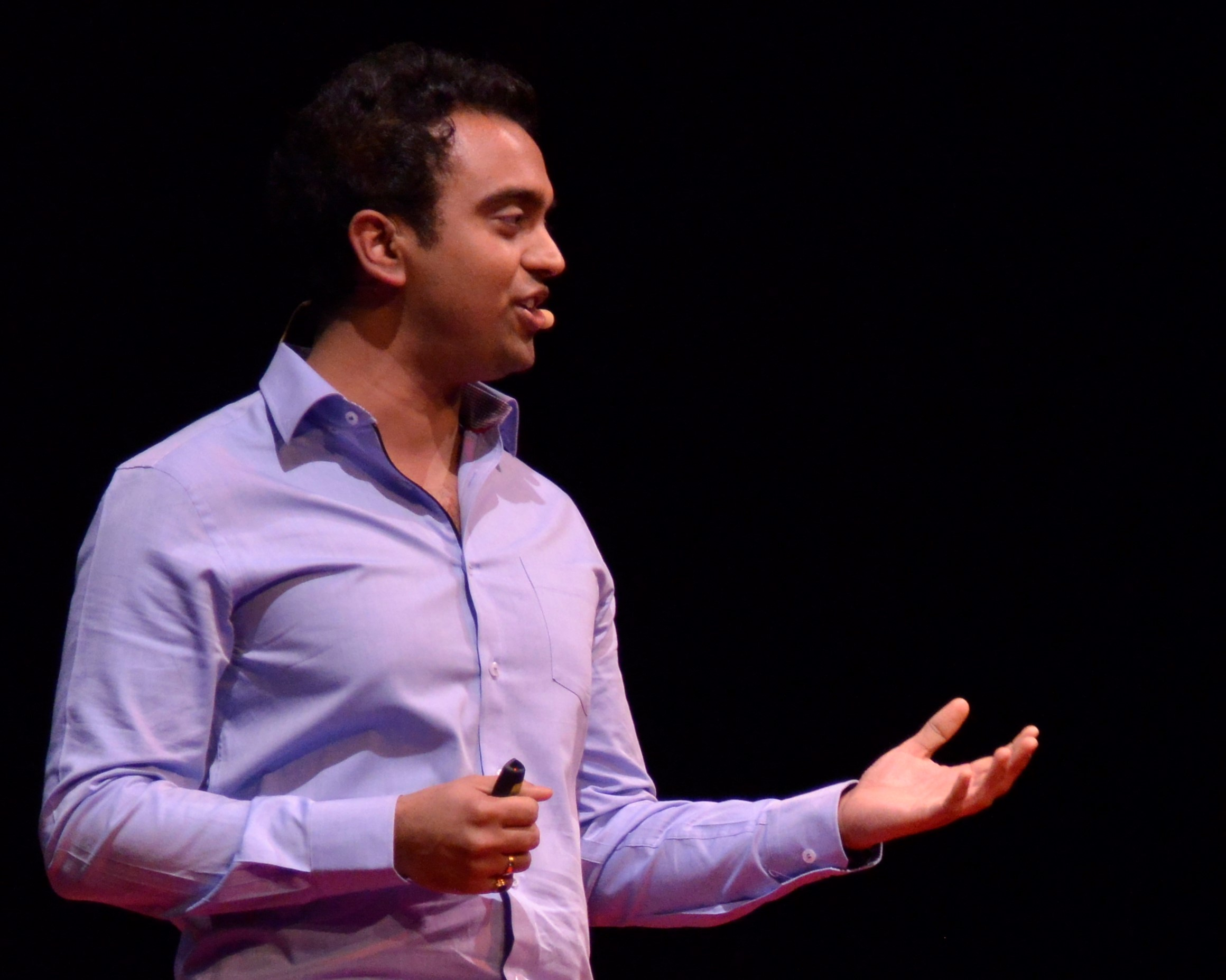
- Tej Tadi in 2014
- Born: India
- Education: École Polytechnique Fédérale de Lausanne (EPFL)
- Occupations: Entrepreneur, engineer, neuroscientist, inventor
- Title: Founder & CEO of MindMaze
- Website: mindmazetherapeutics.com

Tej Tadi is the CEO of MindMaze, a company that generates $30 million a year in revenue from its computing platform. The company is valued at over $1.6 billion.

== Early life and education ==
Tej Tadi was born in a family of physicians in Hyderabad. After studying Electronics Engineering in India, he moved to Switzerland in 2004 to pursue his PhD, which he received from the Ecole Polytechnique Fédérale de Lausanne (EPFL). His topic was Neural Mechanisms of the Embodied Self: Merging virtual reality and electrical neuroimaging. He is on the international advisory board of the Brain Forum.

== Public and media appearances ==
Tej Tadi has delivered talks at scientific conferences and meetings around the world on his research. He has been profiled in Forbes, Fortune, and Techcrunch. He appeared at TEDxLausanne in 2014 to speak about accelerating recovery after a stroke.

== Patents filed ==
US application 2016235323 Tej Tadi, Gangadhar Garipelli, Davide Manetti, Nicolas Bourdad, Daniel Perez Marcos: "Physiological Parameter Measurement and Feedback System" filing date 18 August 2016

WO application 2014154839 Tej Tadi, Leandre Bolomey, Davide Manetti, Sebastien Lasserre: "High Definition 3D Camera Device" filing date 2 October 2014

WO application 2016139576 Tej Tadi, Gangadhar Garipelli, Daniel Perez Marcos, Nicolas Bourdad, Gerardo de Jesus Chavez Castaneda, Leandre Bolomey: "Brain Activity Measurement and Feedback System" filing date 9 September 2016

US application 2017209737 Tej Tadi, Rognini Giulio: "Upper Limb Rehabilitation System" filing date 27 July 2017

== Awards and honours ==
In 2009, the Pfizer Foundation awarded Tadi the neuroscience research prize. In 2011, he also received the Chorafas Foundation Award for his work. In 2012, the IMD Business School honoured Tej with its startup prize. In 2015, The World Economic Forum named him a Young Global Leader. In 2016, he was named EY Entrepreneur of the Year.

== Notable research articles ==
Tej Tadi has co-authored several peer-reviewed journal articles in the areas of embodied self, manipulating bodily self-consciousness, boundaries of agency and conscious experience humans and neurorehabilitation using virtual reality and brain imaging techniques.
