= Wasi, Indonesia =

Coordinates: 1°40′00″N 120°01′59″E

Wasi is an upland village in Donggala Regency, Central Sulawesi, on the island of Sulawesi, in Indonesia. It lies at an elevation of approximately 357 meters. It is on the left (north) bank of a tributary of the Lariang River, upstream from Pilimakujawa.
