= Sidiga Washi =

Sudanese academic (1955–2018)

- Born: May 5, 1955; Wadmedni, sudan
- Died: October 13, 2018 (aged 63)
- Education: Bachelor of Science, Ahfad University, 1981. Bachelor of Science, Qatar University, 1984. Master of Science, Iowa State University, 1988.
- Occupations: women right activist, Researcher
- Awards: Recipient scholarship United Nations Fund for Population Activities, 1990.

Sidiga Abdelrahim Washi (Arabic; صديقةوشي sidiga washiا) (5 May 1955 – 3 October 2018) was a Sudanese academic specializing in population, reproductive health and nutrition.

Sidiga Washi was a professor of family and consumer sciences/community nutrition, dean of the School of Family/Health Sciences and former director nutrition and health research and training at Ahfad University for Women in Sudan, and director of the quality assurance and institutional assessment office at the university.

== Education ==
Bachelor of Science, Ahfad University

Bachelor of Science, Qatar University, 1984.

Master of Science, Iowa State University, 1988.

Doctor of Philosophy, Iowa State University, 1992.

== Career ==
Washi had the membership of Babiker Badri Science Association for Women Studies (as activist since 1985, and then as secretary 1985–1986), Washi also was follow of the American Vocational Education Association, International Vocational Education and Training Association, Women in Development (Honorary award 1991), International Federation of Home Economics, Home Economics Association for Africa, Sudanese Studies Association, Society Nutrition Education.

=== Positions held ===
- International Federation of Home Economics (IFHE) President from 2016 to 2018
- Vice-president of East Africa Region for the International Vocational Education and Training Association (IVETA) for four years and a member of the Association of Women in Development (AWID).
- Consultant for OXFAM, UNICEF, UNFPA, and many other NGOs.

=== Recognition ===
Washi was awarded the Glenn Murphy International Award by the Women's Club at her former university, Iowa State University, in recognition of her work towards the advancement of women in Sudan.
