= Vashi, Raigad =

Village in Maharashtra

Vashi Washi
- village
- Location in Maharashtra, India Vashi (India)
- Coordinates: 18°45′00″N 73°02′30″E
- Country: India
- State: Maharashtra
- District: Raigad
- Elevation: 10 m (33 ft)

Population (2011)
  - Total: 1,977

Languages
  - Official: Marathi
- Time zone: UTC+5:30 (IST)

Vashi (Washi) is a panchayat village in Pen Taluka, Raigad District, Maharashtra, India, on a distributary of the Bhogeshwar River that flows into the Amba River. Vashi is 7.7 km by road northwest of the village of Pen.

There are three villages in the gram panchayat: Vashi, Odhangi, and Sarebhag (N.V.).

== Demographics ==
In the 2011 India census, Vashi had a population of 1,977.
