= Roma Route =

Project of the EU to study the Romani culture

Roma Routes was established in 2007 to encourage the study of European heritage and culture. The project was established by the European Union and ended in 2013. The main purpose of the Roma Route was to break the "cultural barrier" between the Roma and Non-Roma. Roma is a very lonely group in Europe, and most European countries have "discrimination" against Roma. Discrimination in most European countries also prevents Roma's culture from spreading worldwide. Through the Roma Route, the European Union hopes to change the living conditions of the Roma and enhance the cultural communication of the Roma to the world.

== History ==
=== Brief ===
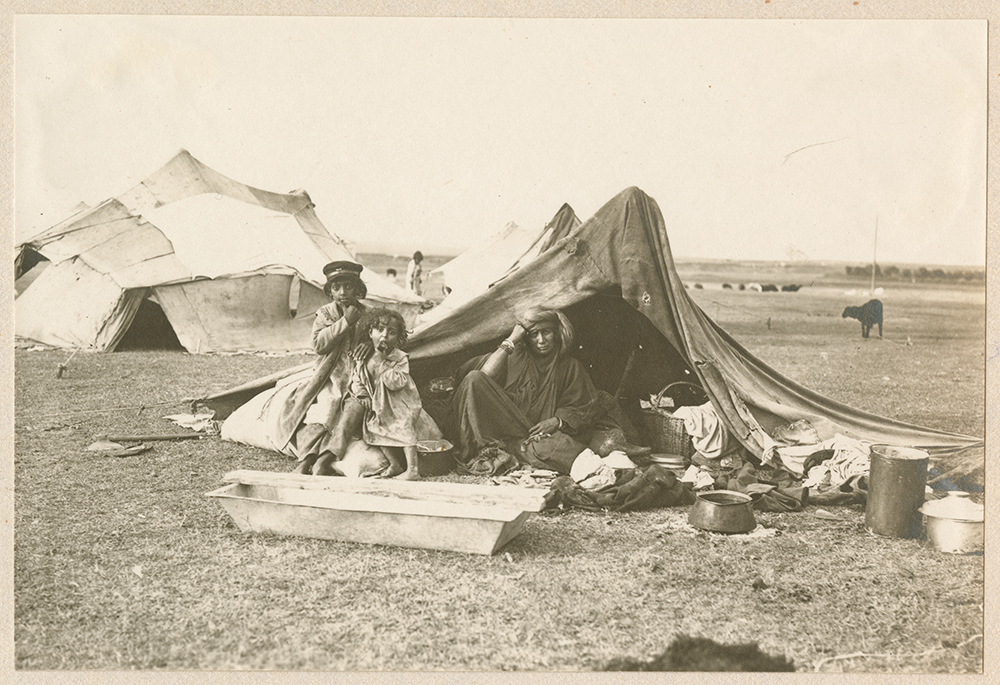
The migration route of Roma

Roma culture is unique but only passed down among the Roma. To bring awareness to the outside world and to repair the relationship between Roma and Non-Roma, the European Union has established a cultural communication program called Roma Route. The four objectives of the European Union established this cultural project are as follows: 1. Publicizing Roman heritage and culture; 2. Developing the culture of Roman heritage to the world; 3. Resonating and creating dialogue between Roman culture and external culture; 4. Improving Roman image and help break the "cultural barrier" between Roma and Non-Roma. Before this cultural project, Roman culture and the outside world were at a fault stage. The main reason for the cultural gap is racial discrimination, resulting in the Roma and the outside world do not know each other's culture. Roma Route hopes to break down racial discrimination by connecting the Roma (Gypsies)/Roma communities with the outside world.

=== Principal ===
Project manager: Lalage Grundy

Roma representative: Ann Wilson

== Roma culture ==
=== Roma ===
The Roma (also called Gypsies) are one of the largest European ethnic minorities who have migrated to Europe for over 1,000 years. According to the United Nations Children's Fund (UNICEF), nearly 12 million to 15 million (70% of the Roma) still live in Eastern Europe. According to Time data, 1 million Roma live in the United States.

=== Belief ===
The Roma do not have a unified belief because they think they are "many stars scattered in the sight of God." The Roma are scattered throughout the world, and their religious beliefs depend mainly on the religious beliefs of their country. But the Roma have their own life rules, called "Rromamo." The Roma believe that "Rromamo" represents their worldview.

=== Language and Culture ===
The Roma have their unique language and culture, and "Roma" is a word created by the Roma themselves. The language of Roma belongs to the Indo-Aryan, which is a branch of the Indo-European languages. Since Roma live in various parts of the world, they also have different dialects.

=== Roman Organization ===
==== Roma Support Group (RSG) ====
The Roma Support Group was founded in 1998 and is a non-profit organization that helps Roma. In the past, the Roma were consistently discriminated against by people from other regions, resulting in the life of the Roma has always been in a dark state. To help the life of Roma, some Roma decided to set up the Roma Support Group.

== Development history ==
=== Prospect ===
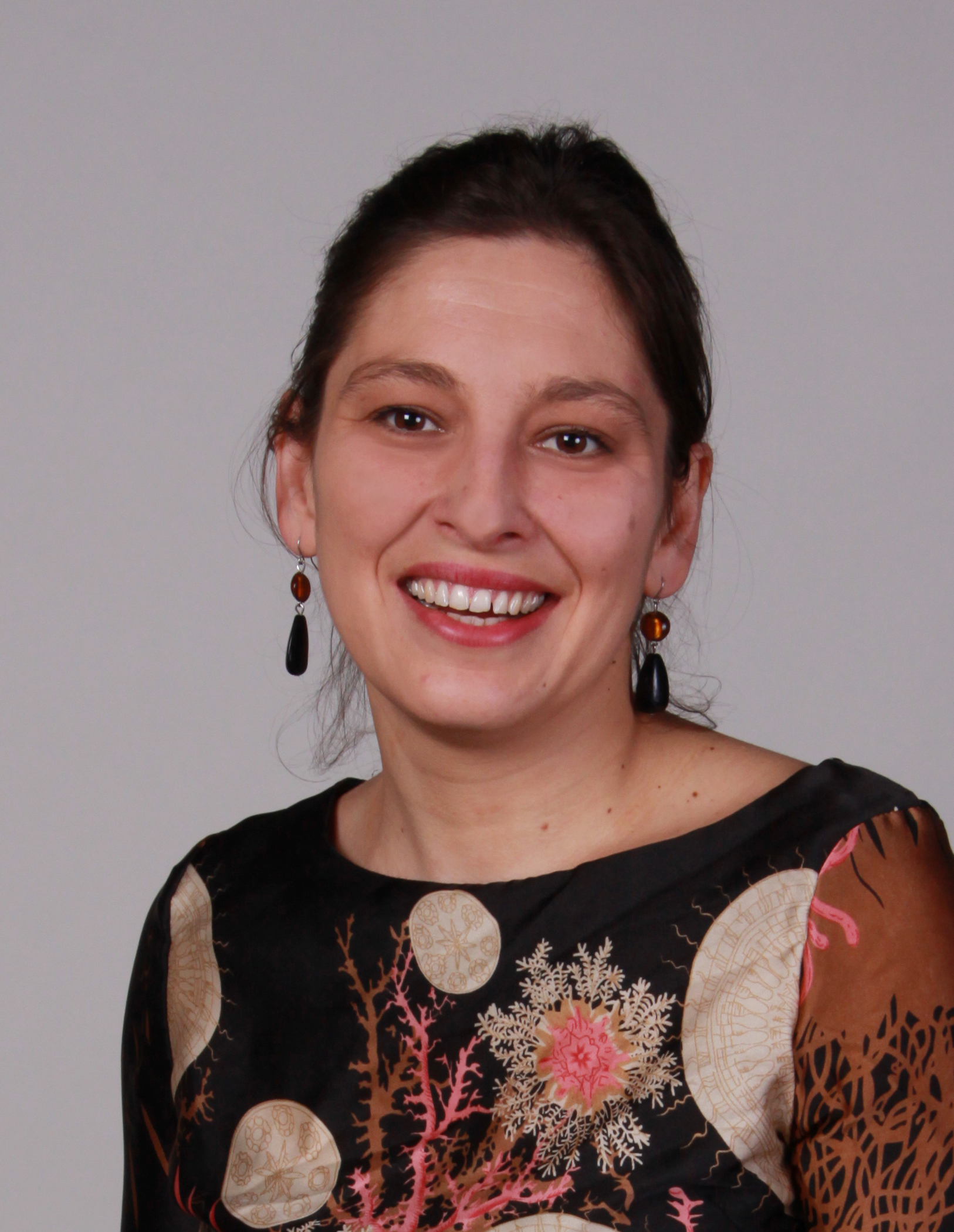
Lívia Járóka

Ms. Livia Jaroka, a Roma of partly Romanian descent, was a Hungarian female politician. Lívia Járóka was appointed by Hungary as the second Roma (but the first Roma woman) of the European Parliament in June 2004.

In 2005, nine countries (the Republic of Bulgaria, the Republic of Croatia, the Czech Republic, Hungary, the Republic of North Macedonia, Montenegro, Romania, Serbia, and Slovakia) launched the "Decade of Roma Inclusion" to eliminate the prejudice against the Roma and improving the life of the Roma. Ms. Livia Jaroka (the European Parliament) and "Decade of Roma Inclusion" are the prospects for forming Roma Routes.

=== Early-stage preparations ===
The Roma are the best publicists in spreading the culture of Roma. However, before the launch of this cultural project, the Roma did not intend to share their culture with the outside world. Because they believe that people of other races have always discriminated against them, and they do not want to interact with the outside world. Through the European Union's continuous efforts and a series of cultural activities, the Roma agreed to participate in this cultural project.

==== Cultural museum about the Roma ====
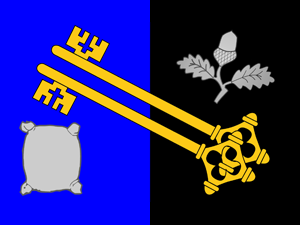
The symbol of the Surrey County Council

The Surrey County Council (United Kingdom) is the main museum of the Roma Route. The assisted museums are the Byzantine and Christian Museum, the Slovene Ethnographic Museum (Slovenia), the Documentation and Cultural Centre of German Sinti and Roma (Germany), and the Association for Rural, Ecological and Cultural Tourism (Romania).

=== Partners ===
As of the end of this project, the European Union has jointly developed a project to develop Roman culture with five countries. The initiator is the European Union, and the assisting party is the Roman communities. The cultural project partners are Germany, Greece, The Republic of Slovenia, Romania, and the United Kingdom.

==== Germany and Roma Route ====
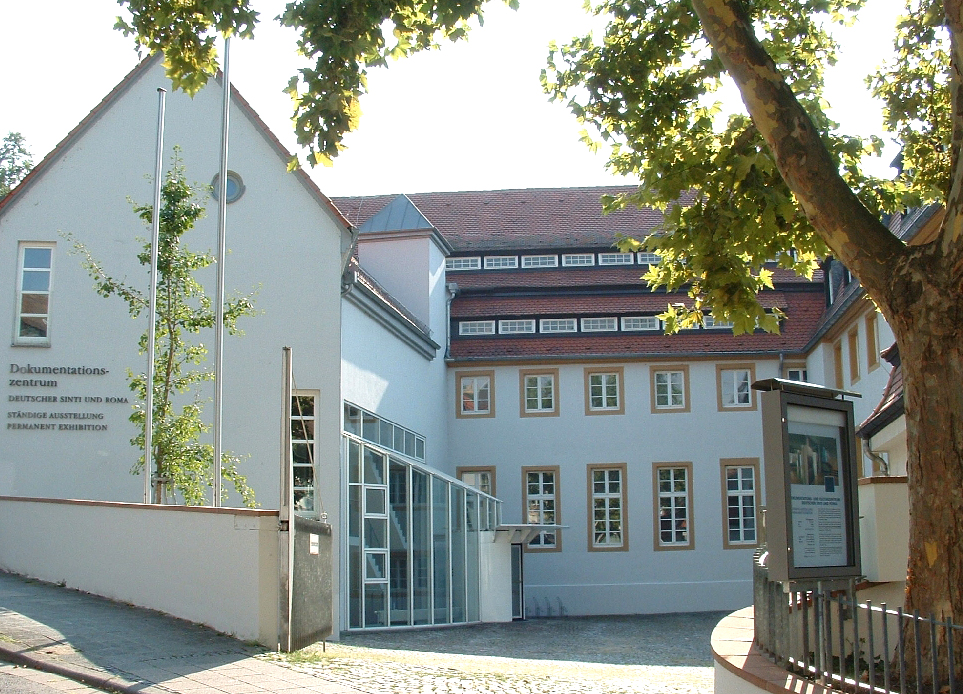
Documentation and Cultural Centre Roma and Sinti in the heart of Heidelbergs old town

Documentation and Cultural Centres of German Sinti and Roma were established in Germany in the 1980s and officially opened publicly in 1997. Documentation and Cultural Centre of German Sinti and Roma record stories about the Roma and the persecution crimes of Romans by the Nazis. Germany is committed to focusing on the propaganda of the Documentation and Cultural Centre of German Sinti and Roma to support Roma Routes, allowing more Germans to understand and learn about Roman culture.

==== Greece and Roma Route ====
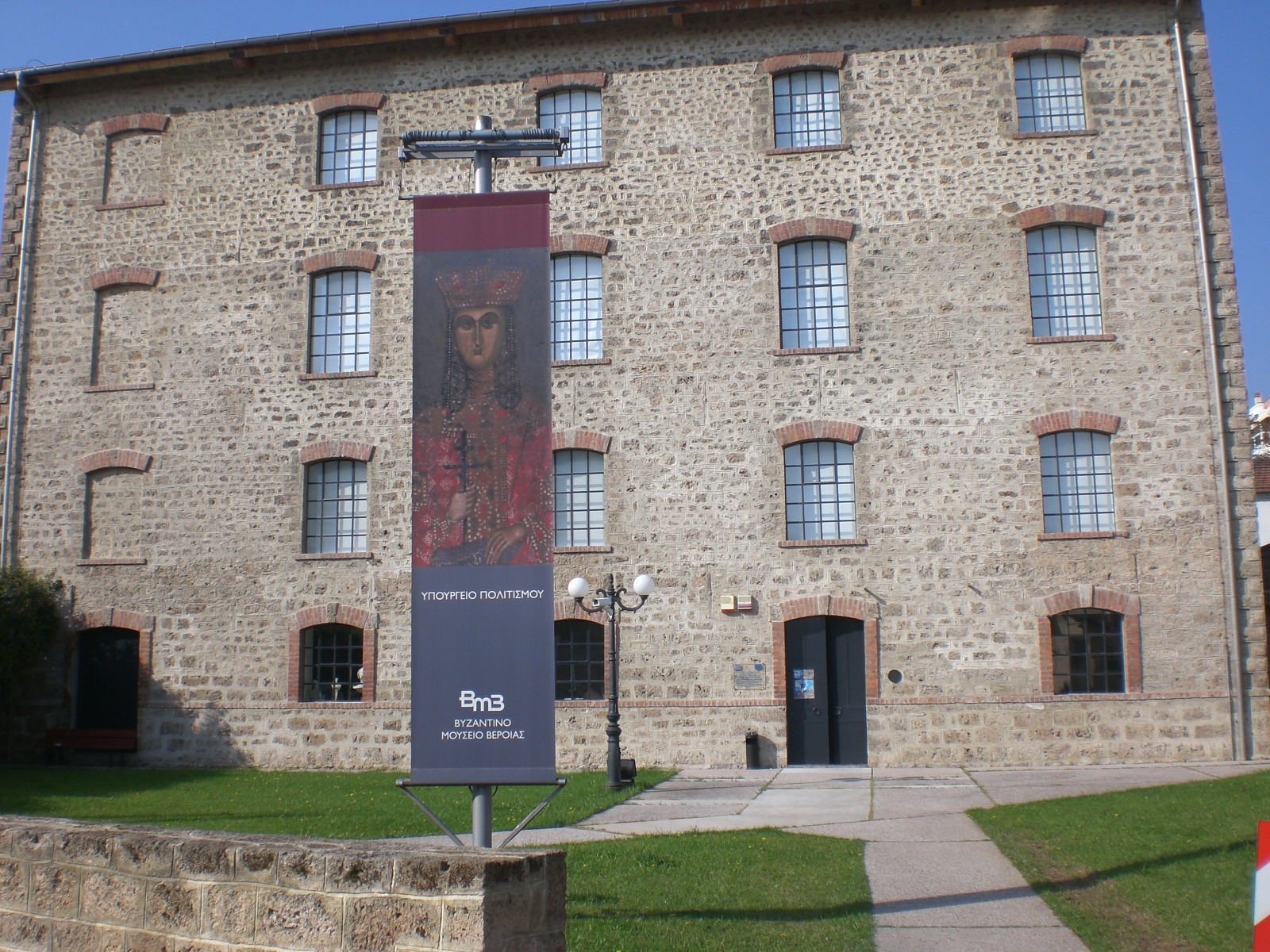
The Byzantine and Christian Museum

Roma has a long history in Greece. According to the material, the Roma entered the land of Greece in 1384 and settled in Greece. This historic moment represents the first important event that the Roma were discovered and recorded in Europe. Influenced by Greek culture, some of the languages in Roman culture are very similar to those of Greek. Through long-term residence, some Roma (known as Muslim Roma at that time) successfully owned Greek nationality in the 1930s. In the 1970s, all Roma who still lived in Greece were allowed to obtain Greek nationality. However, due to the long-term discrimination of Europeans and the unique culture of the Roma (they still communicate with their peers in their language, they did not specialize in the Greek language. This is considered by the Greeks to be very high in the illiteracy rate of the Roma. Greece believes that they cannot communicate with the Roma, which is considered by the Greeks to be very high in the illiteracy rate of the Roma.), For the Greeks, discrimination against Roma is a very "normal" thing. According to Panayote Dimitras, who is the head of the Helsinki Monitor said that "The Greek society is behaving racist while it pretends that it is not racist."

Roma are the ethnic minority in Greece, but there has been no definitive study on the number of Roma, religion, etc. There are also a large number of problems in the daily lives of most Roma people due to "discrimination." To improve the situation of the Roma in Greece, the EU and Greece jointly carried out the activity (Roma Route). The EU has invested much money in the Greek government to support Greece. However, the cooperation between Greece and the EU has not achieved good results. Because the Europeans "habitually" discriminate against the Roma, the Greek government did not use the funds invested by the EU for the Roma. The only thing worth noting is that the Greek government spent only 80,000 euros to investigate the housing needs of Roma in Greece within three years.

Although the Greek government is not very formal in this cultural project, the Byzantine and Christian Museum has done some work. The Byzantine and Christian Museum hosted a series of events that attracted members of the Roma communities to the museum. The art form of this cultural project is mainly film screenings, cultural conferences, educational exhibitions, and training young Roma as informal "mediators" between communities and museums. In this way, The Byzantine Museum and the European Union broke the Romans' "cultural exclusivity" concept. Ultimately, the Roma were willing to share their culture with others.

==== Slovenia and Roma Route ====
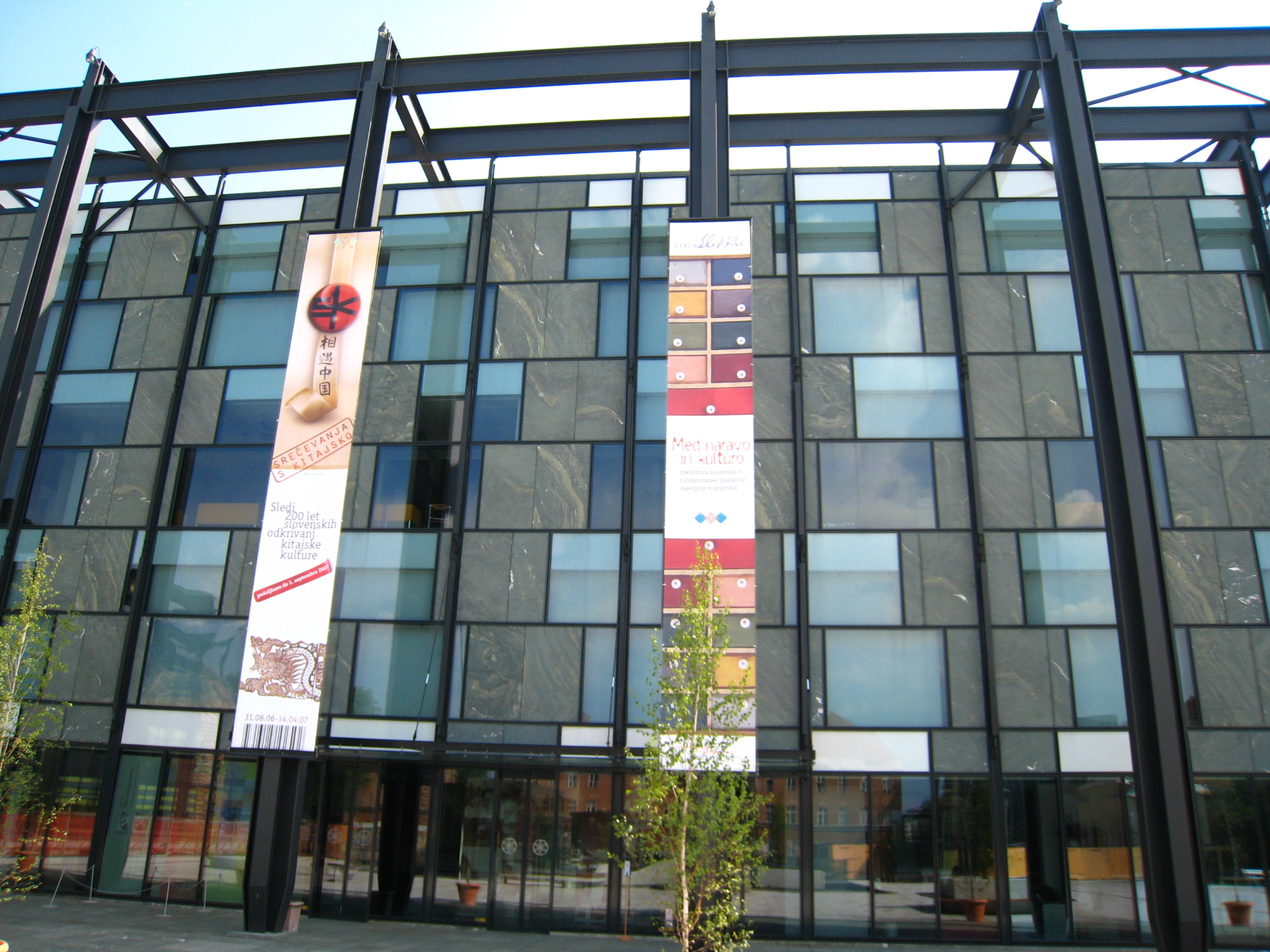
The Slovene Ethnographic Museum

In addition to attracting more Slovenians to learn about Roman culture, the Slovene Ethnographic Museum (Slovenia) has partnered with the government. The Republic of Slovenia considers Roma culture an important part of the diverse composition of European culture. However, this fact is rarely recognized. The Republic of Slovenia believes they are responsible for contributing to the Roma Routes Project. To realize the Roma Route project, the Republic of Slovenia decided to strengthen the human rights education of the Roma. The Republic of Slovenia hosted two meetings for the Roma Routes. The first meeting was "The Round Table on the Situation of Minorities in Slovenia and Slovenians Living Abroad" on 16 June 2009 in Brdo pri Kranju. The second meeting was "the Launch and Partnership Meeting of the 'European Route of Roma Culture and Heritage' Project" on 7 and 8 October 2009 in Lendava and Kamenci.

===== The Round Table on the Situation of Minorities in Slovenia and Slovenians Living Abroad =====
The initiator of the meeting is the Slovenian Chairmanship of the Committee of Ministers of the Council of Europe, the office of the Government of the Republic of Slovenia for Slovenes Abroad, and the office of the Government of the Republic of Slovenia for National Minorities. The participants are representatives, experts, and politicians of minority communities. This is the first meeting held by the Slovenian government to discuss minority issues with the public. This meeting mainly discusses the situation of ethnic minorities and how to use their political influence to improve the lives of minority people. In this meeting, government officials initially set two goals: protecting the rights of Italian and Hungarian minorities and establishing a Roma community for Roma in Slovenia. The Prime Minister of the Republic of Slovenia, Borut Pahor, pointed out that the Slovenian government needs to continue looking for the correct minority policy and help them improve their life.

===== The Launch and Partnership Meeting of the "European Route of Roma Culture and Heritage" Project =====
The "European Route of Roma Culture and Heritage" Project is an event launched by the Slovenian government in conjunction with the European Union in response to the Roma Route, the aim of this project is to break the cultural partition between Roma and non-Roma and to allow both parties to communicate their respective cultures freely or face to face through this activity. At this meeting, the Slovenian government hopes to use the Roma, who live in Prekmurje, as the starting point for this event. The Slovenian government pointed out that this event was not only beneficial to the Roma but also a great help to Slovenia. Discrimination against a nation should not be a practice for Slovenian citizens, but it must be said that people from European countries are discriminating against Roma. The Slovenian government hopes that the people of Slovenia can break through narrow ideas and pass this event.

==== Romania and Roma Route ====
The Association for Rural, Ecological and Cultural Tourism (Romania) also took some action to encourage more people to understand Roma culture and communicate with the Roma.

==== The United Kingdom and Roma Route ====
Roma is also one of the most disadvantaged minorities in the United Kingdom, as it is seen in other countries. The United Kingdom census does not take seriously the number of Roma in the United Kingdom, which is estimated to have at least 200,000 people. Roma are also restricted in every aspect of British life, such as housing and education, and Roma and British culture do not mix because of difficulties. In order to spread Roma culture in the United Kingdom, the European Union and the British government have also adopted some activities. The Surrey County Council (United Kingdom), the main responsible museum for the Roma Route, has increased the museum's publicity efforts to attract more British people to understand the Roma culture. But Roma's life and culture are about to plummet again without the help of the European Union (Brexit).

== Achievement ==
=== The final conference ===
On March 15, 2012, the Documentation and Cultural Centre of German Sinti and Roma (Chairman of the Central Council of German Sinti and Roma: Romani Rose) held the last meeting of this cultural project.

At the meeting, cooperating countries and the European Union published the benefits of this project and celebrated the success of the development of the culture and heritage of Rome. For example, a successful youth summer camp helps Roma and non-Roma break the cultural barrier.

They believe this cultural event has been very successful with the Roma community and has successfully developed the culture beyond Athens and Attica. Leaders of the cultural project of the Roma Route and the European Union hope to continue passing cultural coverage to other parts of Greece through subsequent projects.

=== The achievement of Roma Route ===
The benefits of this cultural project to the Roma are obvious. Firstly, the Roma Route helped people in some European countries eliminate prejudice against the Roma. It is undeniable that many countries have been prejudiced against the Roma for centuries, and prejudice cannot be eliminated from this cultural project. The Roma Route is just the beginning; the leaders of the Roma Route hope that European countries can make up their minds to continue helping their nationals reduce their prejudice against the Roma, thus achieving the complete elimination of the results through the Roma Route. Second, the Roma Route successfully opened a cultural exchange bridge for Roma and non-Roma. A world with multiple cultures is wonderful, but people who create them should not be locked into their own culture. A person who understands "shared culture" can enjoy the fun that multiculturalism brings to him/her.

The EU has taken the first and very important step toward cultural exchange between Roma and non-Roma people. The next cultural project about Roma can achieve even higher achievements.

== See also ==
- Doma (caste)
- Timeline of Romani history
- History of the Romani people
- Romani diaspora
