= Vasi-ye Sofla =

Vasi-ye Sofla وصي سفلي
- Village
- Location within Iran
- Coordinates: 35°05′22″N 46°48′58″E
- Country: Iran
- Province: Kurdistan
- County: Sanandaj
- Bakhsh: Central
- Rural District: Zhavarud-e Sharqi

Population (2006)
  - Total: 404
- Time zone: UTC+3:30 (IRST)
  - Summer (DST): UTC+4:30 (IRDT)

Vasi-ye Sofla (Persian: وصي سفلي, also Romanized as Vaşī-ye Soflá; also known as Vāsī, Vaşī-ye Pā’īn, and Wassi) is a village in Zhavarud-e Sharqi Rural District, in the Central District of Sanandaj County, Kurdistan Province, Iran. At the 2006 census, its population was 404, in 97 families. The village is populated by Kurds.
