= Vashi Domínguez =

Spanish entrepreneur (born 1978)

Vashi Dominguez
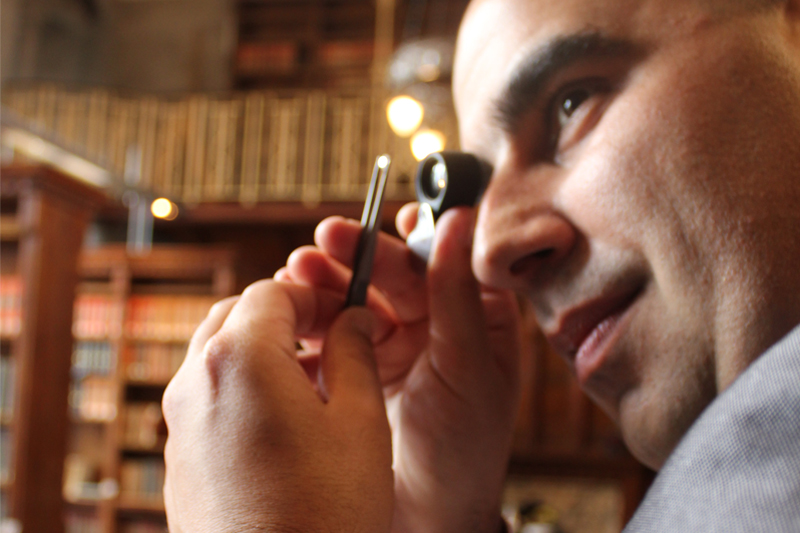
- Dominguez inspecting a diamond
- Born: 1978 (age 47–48); Puerto de la Cruz, Spain
- Education: Casa Azul; University of La Laguna (dropped out)
- Occupation: Fraudster
- Years active: 1999–present

Vashi Nanwani Dominguez (born 1978) is a Spanish entrepreneur best known for founding the jewelry retailer Vashi. He had been accused of investment scam and his whereabouts is unknown.

== Early life ==
Dominguez was born to a Sindhi Indian father and Spanish mother in Puerto de la Cruz, Tenerife, where he grew up. He was educated at Casa Azul School and the University of La Laguna where he studied law but left in the second year.

Dominguez began his career importing technology from China. He built up a chain of shops that he sold in 1999.

== Diamond seller ==
In September 2013, Diamond Manufacturers rebranded to Vashi.com.

In 2017, VASHI opened its first flagship store in Piccadilly, London.

On 5 April 2023, VASHI was declared bankrupt.

In May 2023, the domain Vashi.com was acquired by Queensmith Master Jewellers in Hatton Garden.

At the beginning of June 2023, Vashi Dominguez's whereabouts was unknown; he had vanished since the company's collapse.

According to BBC Panorama at the beginning of September 2025, staff were told to pose as customers to trick investors in the UK's biggest diamond scam.
