= Timeline of Romani history =

The Romani people have long been a part of the collective mythology of the West, where they were (and very often still are) depicted as outsiders, aliens, and a threat. For centuries they were enslaved in Eastern Europe and hunted in Western Europe: the Pořajmos, Hitler's attempt at genocide, was one violent link in a chain of persecution that encompassed countries generally considered more tolerant of minorities, such as the United Kingdom. Even today, while there is a surge of Romani self-identification and pride, restrictive measures are being debated and passed by democratic states to curb the rights of the Romani people.

It is generally thought that the Romanies, because they had no written language until relatively recently, have origins obscured by some mythical past. Although there are many unanswered questions, much more is known about the Romanies than is assumed. The greater problem in attempting a comprehensive history of the Romanies is their distribution, not only throughout Europe, but also beyond its borders. In each region, Romani history diverged, depending on the attitudes of the host population. For instance, although slavery and serfdom are key themes in the history of Romani in the Eastern Europe, other forms of persecution, including early forms of genocide, are preponderant in Western Europe.

What is not often considered is how the implications of this shatter traditional myths about the Romanies. For example, Romanies are considered to be nomadic, which was historically largely true in Western Europe; however, the fact that they were slaves and serfs in the Balkans since at least the 15th century (and until the late 19th century) implies that they were settled. Between 1933 and 1945 Roma and Sinti suffered greatly as victims of Nazi persecution and genocide. Building on long-held prejudices, the Nazi regime viewed Roma both as "asocials" (outside “normal” society) and as racial "inferiors" believed to threaten the biological purity and strength of the “superior Aryan” race

Romani people are believed to be descendants of low-caste dalits and untouchables who departed from Punjab around 500 CE. The Romani people adhered to Hinduism prior to their departure from the Indian subcontinent.

== Timeline ==
40-70: Indian Traders settled in Roman province of Egypt. See also Indo-Roman relations, Indo-Roman trade relations, Indo-Mediterranean, Spice trade, and Indian maritime history.

420-438: Indian Musicians taken by Bahram V Zoroastrianism king of Sasanian Empire from India to Persia. See also Hind (Sasanian province) - a southeastern Sasanian province lying near the Indus River in India.

740: Roma people settled in Phrygia a kingdom in the west-central part of Anatolia in what is now Asian Turkey. See also Greek campaigns in India and Ancient Greece–Ancient India relations.

800-803: Roma people in Adrianopolis in the Roman province of Thracia (modern Edirne in European Turkey).

c. 1050-1054: Roma people settled in Sulukule. See also Early history of Romani people in Turkey.

c. 1100: Romani people recorded in the Byzantine Empire.

1300-1400: Romanies already settled in Serbia; in the same time they reached Wallachia (a historical and geographical region of modern-day Romania) where they are perceived as aliens and enslaved. Also see Wallachian Roma.

1407: Romani recorded living in Germany; within ten years they are expelled.

1418: Romanies recorded in France.

1422: Romanies recorded in Rome during the rule of Papal States headed by the Pope.

1425: Gitano Romanies recorded in Spain.

1471: Anti-Romani laws passed in Lucern, Switzerland.

1482: Anti-Romani laws passed in Brandenburg, Germany.

1492: Spain passes anti-Romani laws under Alhambra Decree and subjects Romanies to the Spanish Inquisition as heretics.

1498: Romani settlement in the Americas begins, when four Romanies accompany Christopher Columbus on his third voyage, as slaves.

1502: Louis XII expels the Romanies from France.

1512: Romani recorded in Sweden.

1526: Henry VIII expels the Romanies from England. Romanies caught entering England are to be punished with death.

1530: Egyptians Act 1530 passed in England.

1530: Muslim Roma got their own Sandjak in Rumelia of Ottoman Empire.

1536: Anti-Romani laws passed in Denmark.

1538: Portugal expels Romanies to Brazil.

1540: Anti-Romani laws passed in Flanders - northern part of Belgium.

1541: Anti-Romani laws passed in Scotland.

1549: Anti-Romani laws passed in Bohemia.

1557: Anti-Romani laws passed in Poland and Lithuania.

1560: In Sweden, the Lutheran Church forbids any priests to baptize, marry or bury Romani.

1563: Romanies are denied entrance into the priesthood by the Council of Trent.

1571: Sweden: The act of 1560 are retracted and the church are permitted to baptize, marry and bury Romani.

1578: The King of Sweden attempt to expel the Romani by threatening them with forced labor in Sala silver mine.

1589: Denmark imposes a death sentence on any Romani caught in the country.

1595: Ştefan Răzvan, son of a Romani immigrant from the Ottoman Empire, rules Moldavia for four months.

1619: Philip III of Spain orders all Romanies to settle down and abandon their traditional lifestyle and culture. Failure to do so is punishable by death.

1637: Anti-Romani laws passed in Sweden: all adult Romani men are sentenced to death, while women and children are to be expelled.

1740-1789: In the Habsburg monarchy under Maria Theresa (1740–1780), a series of decrees tried to force the Romanies to permanently settle, removed rights to horse and wagon ownership (1754), renamed them as "New Citizens" and forced Romani boys into military service if they had no trade (1761), forced them to register with the local authorities (1767), and prohibited marriage between Romanies (1773). Her successor Josef II prohibited the wearing of traditional Romani clothing and the use of the Romani language, punishable by flogging.

1748: Romani are officially permitted to reside and live in Sweden.

1936-1945: Nazis begin systematic persecution of Romanies, culminating in the genocide of 500,000-1,500,000 Romanies in what is called Porajmos, the Romani Holocaust.

1967: The International Gypsy Committee was created.

1971:The First World Roma Congress was a significant event in Romani history, held in London, where the Romani flag and the anthem “Gelem, gelem” were officially adopted.

1982: Germany officially recognizes the Romani and Sinti genocide.

2006: University of Manchester completes its "Romani project", the first morphological study aiming to collect all the dialects of Romani language throughout Europe and dealing with their coherency.

2006: The first entirely Romani party is founded in Hungary, called the "MCF Roma összefogás" (MCF Union of the Roma), although they managed only 0.08% of total votes at the parliamentary elections held on April 9, 2006.

2008: The United Kingdom celebrates its first Gypsy Roma Traveller History Month in June.

2010: In July 2010, French President Nicolas Sarkozy began a systematic deportation campaign against the Romani. His targets were Romanian and Bulgarian Roma. Critics of the Sarkozy administration consider the deportations as a diversionary tactic to reduce attention on threats to French social benefits. The United Nations Committee on the Elimination of Racial Discrimination expressed concern the deportations are evidence of growing racism and xenophobia in France.

2011: On September 1, 2011, a Romani academy of arts and sciences was founded in Belgrade to promote, organize, and disseminate research into Romani culture, language, and history. The academy has 21 regular members, including prominent Romani academics and public figures from 11 European countries, India, and the United States. There are 13 honorary members, which have included former Czech President Václav Havel. The academy was co-founded by Rajko Đurić, a Serbian Romani writer and academic who is also its first president, and received initial supporting funds from the German Heinrich Böll Foundation.

2012: On October 24, 2012, after many years of delays and disputes over cost and design, Angela Merkel unveils the Memorial to the Sinti and Roma victims of National Socialism in Berlin.

2016: On February 12, 2016, Indian External Affairs Minister, Sushma Swaraj recognized all Roma people as Indian descendants. She called them flag bearers of Indian ethos and culture. Soon the community would be recognized on par with rest of the Indian diaspora.

== See also ==
- History of the Romani people
- Doma (caste)
- Romani diaspora
